= New Hampshire Route 171 =

State highway in Carroll County, New Hampshire, US

New Hampshire Route 171
- Map of Carroll County in eastern New Hampshire with NH 171 highlighted in red

Route information
- Maintained by NHDOT
- Length: 15.194 mi (24.452 km)

Major junctions
- West end: NH 109 in Moultonborough
- NH 28 in Ossipee
- East end: NH 16 in Ossipee

Location
- Country: United States
- State: New Hampshire
- Counties: Carroll

Highway system
- New Hampshire Highway System; Interstate; US; State; Turnpikes
← NH 156	→ NH 175

New Hampshire Route 171 (abbreviated NH 171) is a 15.194-mile-long (24.452 km) east–west highway in southern Carroll County in the Lakes Region of New Hampshire. The highway runs from NH 109 in Moultonborough to NH 16 in Ossipee.

== Route description ==
NH 171 begins at an intersection with NH 109 (Governor John Wentworth Highway) in the town of Moultonborough. The two-lane highway heads east as Mountain Road, which passes along the southern flank of the Ossipee Mountains, including Mount Roberts, Turtleback Mountain, and Mount Shaw, and by the Castle in the Clouds. NH 171 continues through the town of Tuftonboro, where the route crosses the Melvin River and passes to the south of Dan Hole Pond. The highway enters the town of Ossipee at the community of Water Village, the namesake of the highway's name in the town. NH 171 crosses the Beech River in Water Village, then climbs over high ground south of Thompson Hill and intersects NH 28 west of Ossipee Corner, the town center of Ossipee. The highway parallels Poland Brook east of Ossipee Corner and reaches its eastern terminus at NH 16 (White Mountain Highway) just north of that highway's crossing of Poland Brook.

== Major intersections ==
The entire route is in Carroll County.

Location	mi	km	Destinations	Notes
Moultonborough	0.000	0.000	NH 109 (Governor John Wentworth Highway) – Moultonborough, Melvin Village, Wolfeboro	Western terminus
Ossipee	13.448	21.642	NH 28 – Conway, Wolfeboro	
Ossipee	15.194	24.452	NH 16 (White Mountain Highway) – Conway, Rochester	Eastern terminus
1.000 mi = 1.609 km; 1.000 km = 0.621 mi
