= Tuftonboro, New Hampshire =

- Town
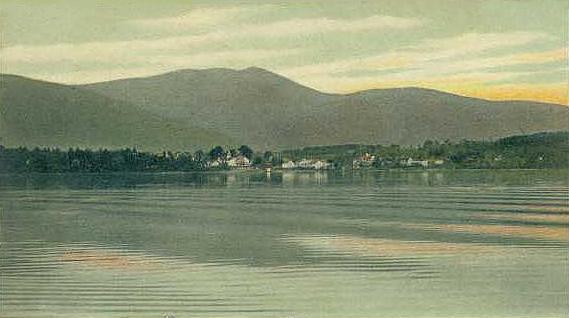
- Melvin Village from Lake Winnipesaukee c. 1906
- Motto: "The Diamond in the Heart of New Hampshire"
- Location in Carroll County, New Hampshire
- Coordinates: 43°40′29″N 71°15′48″W
- Country: United States
- State: New Hampshire
- County: Carroll
- Incorporated: 1795
- Villages: Center Tuftonboro; Melvin Village; Mirror Lake; Tuftonboro Corner; Union Wharf

Area
  - Total: 49.4 sq mi (128.0 km^{2})
  - Land: 40.5 sq mi (104.9 km^{2})
  - Water: 8.9 sq mi (23.1 km^{2}) 18.06%
- Elevation: 591 ft (180 m)

Population (2020)
  - Total: 2,467
  - Density: 61/sq mi (23.5/km^{2})
- Time zone: UTC-5 (Eastern)
  - Summer (DST): UTC-4 (Eastern)
- ZIP codes: 03816 (Center Tuftonboro); 03850 (Melvin Village); 03853 (Mirror Lake); 03894 (Wolfeboro)
- Area code: 603
- FIPS code: 33-77620
- GNIS feature ID: 873741
- Website: www.tuftonboronh.gov

Tuftonboro is a town in Carroll County, New Hampshire, United States. The population was 2,467 at the 2020 census, and an estimated 2,678 in 2025. Bounded on the southwest by Lake Winnipesaukee, Tuftonboro includes the villages of Tuftonboro Corner, Center Tuftonboro, Melvin Village and Mirror Lake.

== History ==
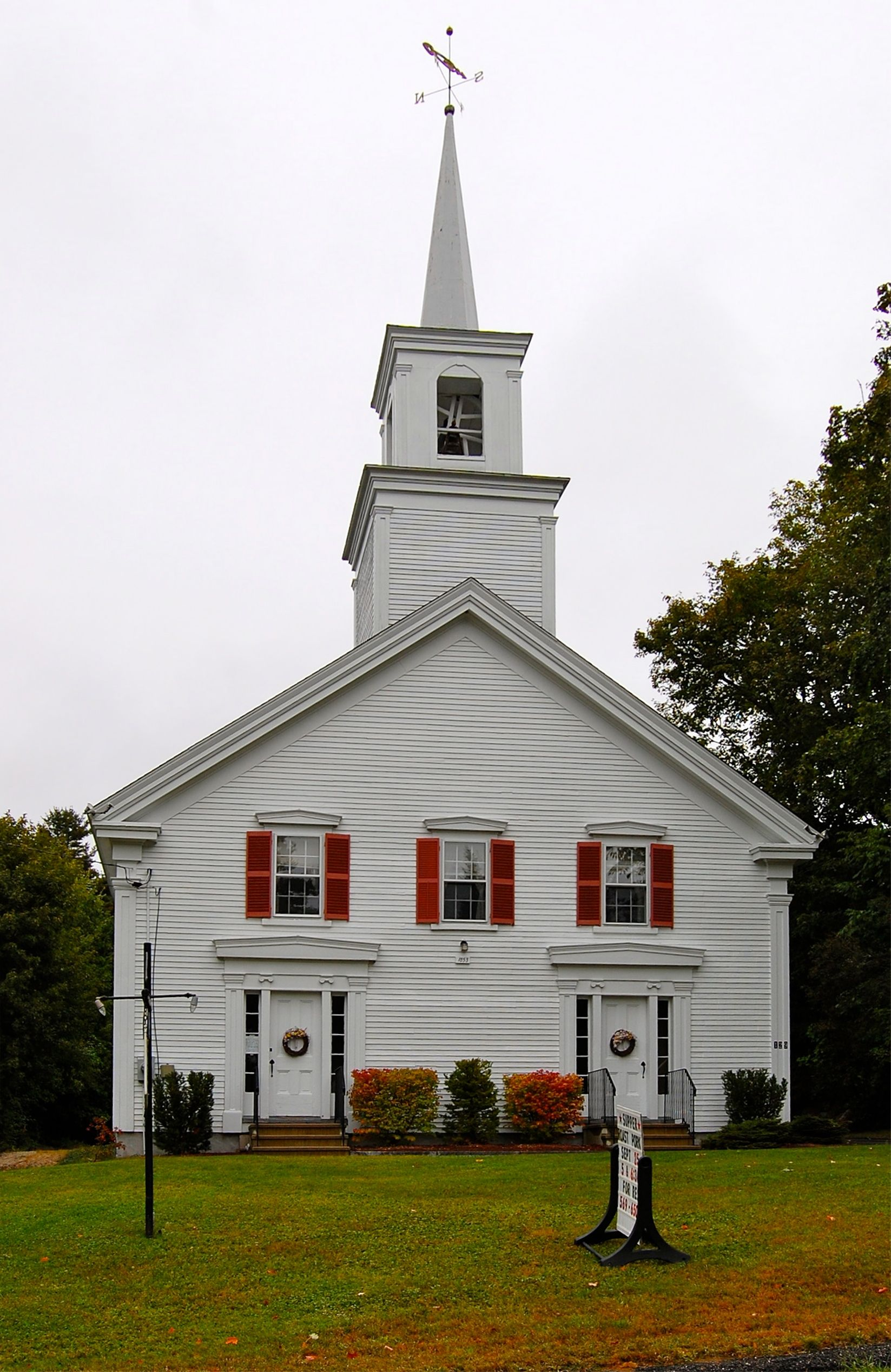
The United Methodist Church in Tuftonboro

Tuftonboro was the only incorporated place in New Hampshire owned by just one man, John Tufton Mason, for whom the town was named. Following the 1741 separation of New Hampshire from Massachusetts, Mason was heir to the Masonian Claim, the undivided lands of northern New Hampshire. He sold them in 1746 to a group of Portsmouth merchants, thereafter known as the Masonian Proprietors. They disposed of the land via grants to prospective settlers prior to the Revolution.

The town was granted as "Tuftonborough" in 1750 by colonial Governor Benning Wentworth, and first settled about 1780. It was incorporated by the legislature on December 17, 1795. By 1859, when the population was 1,305, the principal occupation was raising cattle and sheep across the hilly terrain. Other industries included two sawmills, one sash, blind and door factory, one carriage factory, and two gristmills.

== Geography ==
According to the United States Census Bureau, the town has a total area of 49.4 square miles (128.0 km^{2}), of which 40.5 square miles (104.9 km^{2}) are land and 8.9 square miles (23.1 km^{2}) are water, comprising 18.06% of the town. Tuftonboro is drained by the Melvin River and Beech River, tributaries of Lake Winnipesaukee. Mirror Lake is in the south, and Dan Hole Pond is in the north. The highest point in Tuftonboro is the south peak of Mount Shaw, elevation 2,930 feet (890 m) above sea level, on the town's northwestern boundary.

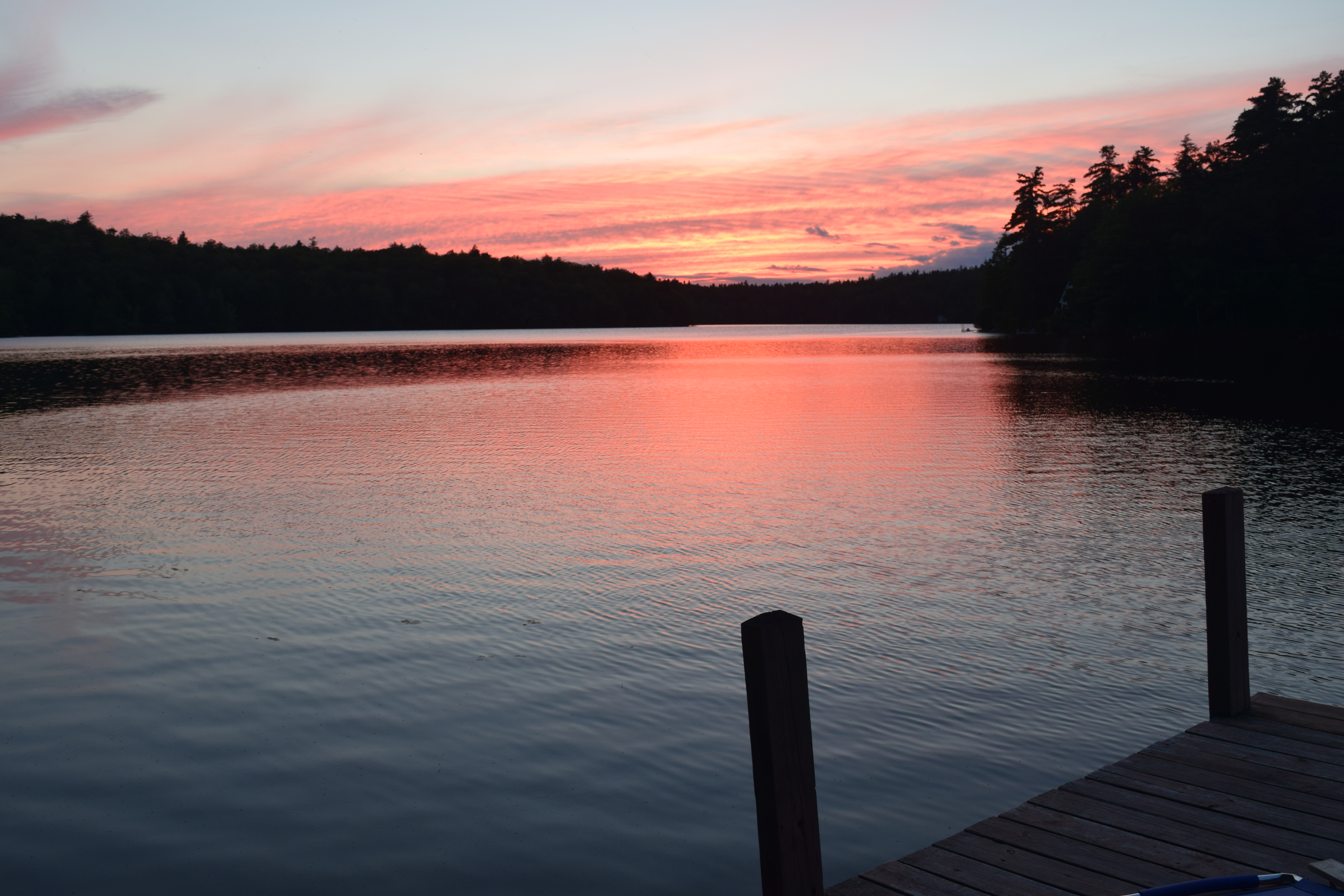
Lower Beech Pond

The northern portion of Tuftonboro is occupied by the Ossipee Mountains. New Hampshire routes 171, 109, and 109A cross the town, all generally in a northwest to southeast direction.

Melvin Village, in the west part of Tuftonboro, is a summer vacation spot on Melvin Bay of Lake Winnipesaukee. It has a marina and many lakeside homes and cottages that are for rent. It is also a popular spot for antique shopping. The community of Mirror Lake is in the southern part of the town, on the southwestern side of the lake of the same name.

Also part of Tuftonboro are several islands in Lake Winnipesaukee, including Little Bear Island and Cow Island among others.

=== Adjacent municipalities ===
- Ossipee (northeast)
- Wolfeboro (southeast)
- Alton (south)
- Moultonborough (northwest)

== Demographics ==
Historical population
Census	Pop.	Note	%±
1790	109		—
1800	357		227.5%
1810	709		98.6%
1820	1,232		73.8%
1830	1,375		11.6%
1840	1,281		−6.8%
1850	1,305		1.9%
1860	1,186		−9.1%
1870	949		−20.0%
1880	923		−2.7%
1890	767		−16.9%
1900	663		−13.6%
1910	612		−7.7%
1920	311		−49.2%
1930	505		62.4%
1940	586		16.0%
1950	697		18.9%
1960	678		−2.7%
1970	910		34.2%
1980	1,500		64.8%
1990	1,842		22.8%
2000	2,148		16.6%
2010	2,387		11.1%
2020	2,467		3.4%
2024 (est.)	2,636		6.9%
U.S. Decennial Census

=== 2010 census ===
At the 2010 census, there were 2,387 people and 736 families in the town. The population density was 58.2 inhabitants per square mile (22.5/km^{2}). There were 2,435 housing units at an average density of 49.1 per square mile (19.0/km^{2}). The racial makeup of the town was 98.1% White, 0.2% African American, 0.1% Native American, 0.3% Asian, 0.1% some other race, and 1.3% from two or more races. Hispanic or Latino of any race were 0.5% of the population.

Of the 1,029 households 26.0% had children under the age of 18 living with them, 61.0% were married couples living together, 6.8% had a female householder with no husband present, 3.7% had a male householder with no wife present, and 28.5% were non-families. 22.8% of households were made up of individuals, and 11.1% were someone living alone who was 65 or older. The average household size was 2.32, and the average family size was 2.68.

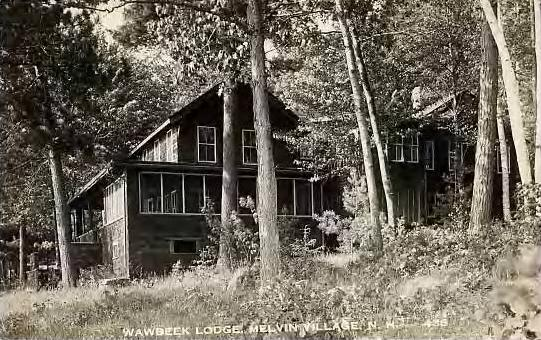
Wawbeek Lodge c. 1920

The age distribution was 18.9% under the age of 18, 4.3% from 18 to 24, 18.1% from 25 to 44, 35.0% from 45 to 64, and 23.7% 65 or older. The median age was 50.8 years. For every 100 females, there were 101.09 males. For every 100 females age 18 and over, there were 99.17 males in the same age group.

For the period 2012–2016, the estimated median annual income for a household in the town was $54,770, and the median family income was $64,479. Male full-time workers had a median income of $46,346 versus $39,219 for females. The per capita income for the town was $29,554. About 5.0% of families and 6.8% of the population were below the poverty line, including 2.5% of those under age 18 and 6.5% of those age 65 or over.

=== 2000 census ===
At the 2000 census, there were 2,148 people, 926 households, and 665 families in the town. The population density was 52.2 inhabitants per square mile (20.2/km^{2}). There were 2,019 housing units at an average density of 49.1 per square mile (19.0/km^{2}). The racial makeup of the town was 98.32% White, 0.23% Native American, 0.23% Asian, 0.05% from other races, and 1.16% from two or more races. Hispanic or Latino of any race were 0.42% of the population.

Of the 926 households 23.9% had children under the age of 18 living with them, 62.9% were married couples living together, 5.3% had a female householder with no husband present, and 28.1% were non-families. 22.9% of households were one person and 9.6% were one person aged 65 or older. The average household size was 2.32 and the average family size was 2.68.

The age distribution was 19.8% under the age of 18, 3.8% from 18 to 24, 22.5% from 25 to 44, 31.8% from 45 to 64, and 22.1% 65 or older. The median age was 48 years. For every 100 females, there were 97.2 males. For every 100 females age 18 and over, there were 97.4 males.

The median household income was $45,729 and the median family income was $51,875. Males had a median income of $36,181 versus $27,109 for females. The per capita income for the town was $25,070. About 4.4% of families and 6.4% of the population were below the poverty line, including 7.1% of those under age 18 and 6.1% of those age 65 or over.

== Sites of interest ==
- Tuftonboro Historical Society & Museum
- New Hampshire Historical Marker No. 276: The Grave by the Lake
- New Hampshire Historical Marker No. 285: Abenaki Tower

== Notable people ==
- Edward H. Brooks (1893–1978), US Army lieutenant general
- Thomas Dreier (1884–1976), writer, who was the first editor of New Hampshire Troubadour
- Charles D. Griffin (1906–1996), US Navy admiral
- Lydia H. Tilton (1839–1915), journalist, poet, lyricist
