= Mirror Lake =

Mirror Lake or Mirror Lakes may refer to:

== Places ==
=== Canada ===
- Mirror Lake (Shuniah), a lake in Shuniah, Ontario
- Mirror Lake (Haliburton County), a lake in Haliburton County, Ontario
- Mirror Lake (Algoma District), a lake in Algoma District, Ontario
- Mirror Lake (Little Morraine Lake, Thunder Bay District), a tributary of Little Morraine Lake, Thunder Bay District, Ontario
- Mirror Lake (Kenora District), a lake in Kenora District, Ontario
- Mirror Lake (Timiskaming District), a lake in Timiskaming District, Ontario
- Mirror Lake (Muskoka District), a lake in Muskoka District, Ontario
- Mirror Lake (Seguin), a lake in Seguin, Ontario
- Mirror Lake (Carling), a lake in Carling, Ontario

=== United States ===
- Mirror Lake (California)
- Mirror Lake (Lake Placid), a lake in Lake Placid, Florida
- Lake Mirror (Lakeland), a lake in Lakeland, Florida
- Lake Mirror (Winter Haven), a lake in Winter Haven, Florida
- Mirror Lake (Tuftonboro, New Hampshire), a lake
- Mirror Lake, New Hampshire, a village on the lake in Tuftonboro
- Mirror Lake (New York), one of two lakes in Lake Placid, New York
- Mirror Lake (Ohio), a small lake on campus at Ohio State University
- Mirror Lake (Wallowa County, Oregon)
- Mirror Lake (Clackamas County, Oregon)
- Mirror Lake (Tuschar Mountains), Utah
- Mirror Lake (Uinta Mountains), Utah
- Mirror Lake State Park, Wisconsin

=== Other ===
- Espejo Lake (Mirror Lake) in Argentina
- Mirror Lakes, set of lakes in New Zealand
- Mirror Lake (镜海, Jìng Hǎi), a lake in Jiuzhaigou, Sichuan, China, casting beautiful reflections of the surroundings when the water is calm

== Music ==
- Mirror Lakes (band), Norwegian band
