= Mount Shaw =

Mountain in the American state of New Hampshire

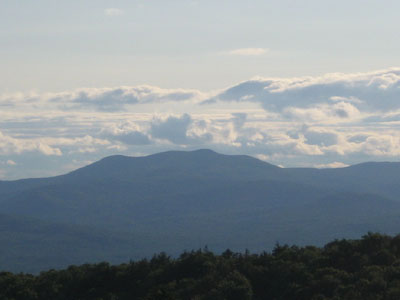

Highest point
- Elevation: 2,990 ft (910 m)
- Prominence: 2,330 ft (710 m)
- Listing: #23 New England Fifty Finest
- Coordinates: 43°44′38″N 71°16′27″W

Geography
- Location: Carroll County, New Hampshire, U.S.
- Parent range: Ossipee Mountains
- Topo map: USGS Melvin Village

Mount Shaw is a mountain located in the towns of Moultonborough and Tuftonboro in Carroll County, New Hampshire, United States. It is part of the remains of an ancient volcanic ring dike. With a summit elevation of 2,990 feet (911 m), it is the highest of the Ossipee Mountains.

The Ossipee ring-dike complex of central New Hampshire is a visible remnant of a 125 million year old Cretaceous stratovolcano, a member of the later White Mountain igneous province. The complex is circular as viewed on maps and has a diameter of 9 miles (14 km). The ring-dike complex is easy to identify within web-browsed satellite images, with its southeast edge located about 5 miles (8 km) northwest of the town center of Ossipee.

Although of only moderate elevation, the topographic isolation of the Ossipee Mountains gives Shaw 2,330 ft (710 m) of prominence above the low ground separating it from the nearby Sandwich Range, the southernmost peaks of the White Mountains, making it one of twelve peaks in New Hampshire with a prominence over 2,000 feet (610 m).

Mount Shaw is located within the Castle in the Clouds estate. Its north and southeast sides drain into the Lovell and Dan Hole rivers, thence into the Ossipee River, Saco River and the Gulf of Maine. The southwest side drains into the Melvin River which flows into Lake Winnipesaukee, thence into the Winnipesaukee River, Merrimack River, and into the Gulf of Maine in Massachusetts.

== See also ==
- List of mountains of New Hampshire
