= West Ossipee, New Hampshire =

Unincorporated community in New Hampshire, United States

- Unincorporated community
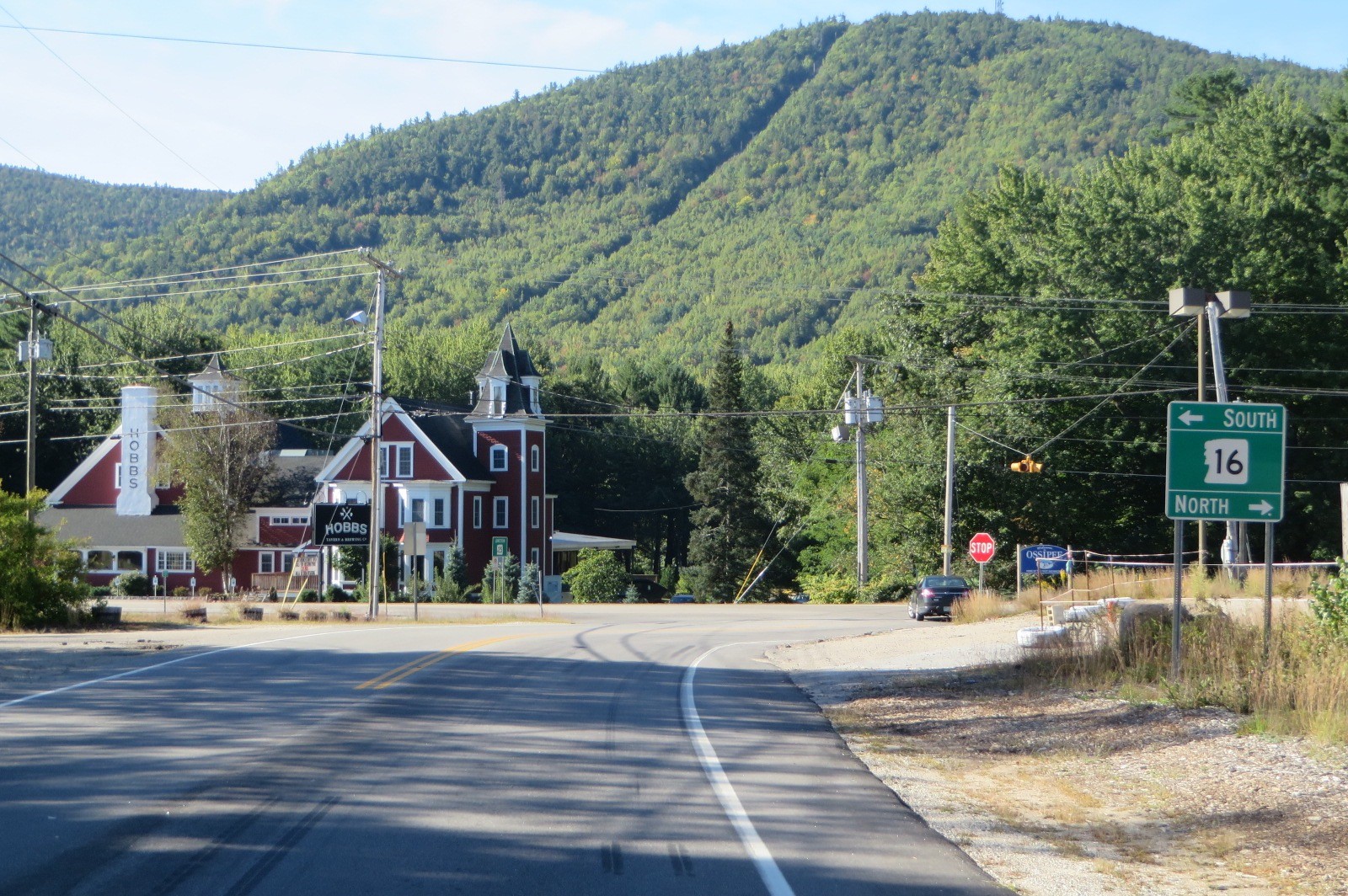
- Intersection of NH 16 and NH 41 in West Ossipee. Nickerson Mountain, site of former Mount Whittier Ski Area, rises in background.

- Location within New Hampshire Location within the United States
- Coordinates: 43°49′29″N 71°12′19″W
- Country: United States
- State: New Hampshire
- County: Carroll
- Town: Ossipee
- Elevation: 433 ft (132 m)
- Time zone: UTC-5 (Eastern (EST))
  - Summer (DST): UTC-4 (EDT)
- ZIP code: 03890
- Area code: 603
- GNIS feature ID: 870784

West Ossipee is an unincorporated community in the town of Ossipee in Carroll County, New Hampshire, United States. It is located near the northern boundary of the town, along New Hampshire Route 16, leading north towards Conway and south towards Rochester. Route 41 departs from the village, heading northeast to Silver Lake and Madison. Route 25 leads west towards Tamworth and Moultonborough. The Bearcamp River runs along the southwestern side of the village. The Whittier Bridge is a historic covered bridge that crosses the river just west of the village.

West Ossipee has a separate ZIP code (03890) from the rest of Ossipee.
