= Thomas Dreier =

American writer and advertising executive (1884–1976)

- Born: May 5, 1884; Durand, Wisconsin, U.S.
- Died: September 4, 1976 (aged 92); St. Petersburg, Florida

Thomas Dreier (May 5, 1884 – September 4, 1976) was an American editor, writer, advertising executive, and business theorist. The Thomas Dreier Reading Room at Peter H. Armacost Library, Eckerd College is named in his honor.

He was born in Durand, Wisconsin in 1884 and edited and published his own short-lived paper, The Menomonie Badger, in Menomonie in 1903 and 1904. He subsequently moved to the Boston area. He built the Frank Chouteau Brown-designed "Snug Gables" in Winchester, Massachusetts, where he lived from 1920 to 1933, and later settled in New Hampshire on a 500-acre (200 ha) farm named "Sunny Meadows" in Melvin Village, Tuftonborough.

In 1935 he and his first wife, Blanche Nowell Dreier, moved to St. Petersburg, Florida. In Florida Thomas served as chairman of the State Library Board and was a leader in rebuilding the St. Petersburg Public Library. Blanche died in 1960 and in 1961 he married Mary Baker.

He died on September 4, 1976 at his home in St. Petersburg.

He was the first editor of the New Hampshire Troubadour magazine.

== Selected works ==
- Heroes of Insurgency (1910)
- The Story of Three Partners; United Shoe Machinery Company, Beverly, Mass. (1911)
- Silver Lining or Sunshine on the Business Trail (1922)
- Sunny Meadows (1933), concerning he and Blanche's life on their farm in New Hampshire
- The Power of Print—and Men (1936), with William Addison Dwiggins
- Man Hunting, the Greatest Sport (1936)
- We Human Chemicals; or, The Knack of Getting Along With Everybody (1948)
