= Mirror Lake, New Hampshire =

Unincorporated community in New Hampshire, United States

- Unincorporated community
- Location within New Hampshire Location within the United States
- Coordinates: 43°37′21″N 71°16′33″W
- Country: United States
- State: New Hampshire
- County: Carroll
- Town: Tuftonboro
- Elevation: 535 ft (163 m)
- Time zone: UTC-5 (Eastern (EST))
  - Summer (DST): UTC-4 (EDT)
- ZIP code: 03853
- Area code: 603
- GNIS feature ID: 868494

Mirror Lake is an unincorporated community in the town of Tuftonboro in Carroll County, New Hampshire. It is located along the shore of Mirror Lake in the Lakes Region of New Hampshire.

The village is located in the southern part of the town of Tuftonboro, and is adjacent to Lake Winnipesaukee as well as Mirror Lake. New Hampshire Route 109 (Governor Wentworth Highway) passes through the village, connecting Wolfeboro to the east and Melvin Village and Moultonborough to the west.

Mirror Lake has a ZIP code of 03853 and is one of three ZIP code areas that cover the town of Tuftonboro, the other two being Melvin Village and Center Tuftonboro. The Mirror Lake zip code covers all of Tuftonboro Neck, 19 Mile and 20 Mile bays and a few of Tuftonboro's islands, including Cow, Farm and Chase. The remainder of Tuftonboro's inhabited islands are in the Center Tuftonboro zip code area, but have their mail shipped though Wolfeboro for delivery by mail boat.

The center of Mirror Lake village is the junction of Tuftonboro Neck Road with the Governor Wentworth Highway. The Mirror Lake Community Church, which only holds services in summer, is in the village center. At one time Mirror Lake had a mill and a general store named "Ernest B. Piper, Groceries and Stuff" which closed in 1969. The village is known for its summer camps, of which there are 5, and for its summer cabin complexes. The village got brief international attention in 2000, when local innkeeper Chuck Diorio positively identified Massachusetts murderer Dr. Richard Sharpe, who was arrested at the Pine View Lodge in Melvin Village.

The small village of Union Wharf lies just north of Mirror Lake, centered on an old dock and marina in 19 Mile Bay. Today Union Wharf houses a summer grocer, boat gasoline pumps, around 70 boat slips and a public beach. The area was once dominated by Nineteen Mile Bay Lodges, a summer cabin renter, which has since become a private property. It is known for its knotty pine cabins, built in the 1950s by Leon Proverb, using mostly materials from Charlestown Navy Yard in Massachusetts.
