= Admiral Griffin =

Admiral Griffin may refer to:

- Anthony Griffin (Royal Navy officer) (1920–1996), British Royal Navy admiral
- Charles D. Griffin (1906–1996), U.S. Navy admiral
- Thomas Griffin (Royal Navy officer) (c. 1692–1771), British Royal Navy admiral
