= Snug Gables =

Coordinates: 42.453°N 71.144°W

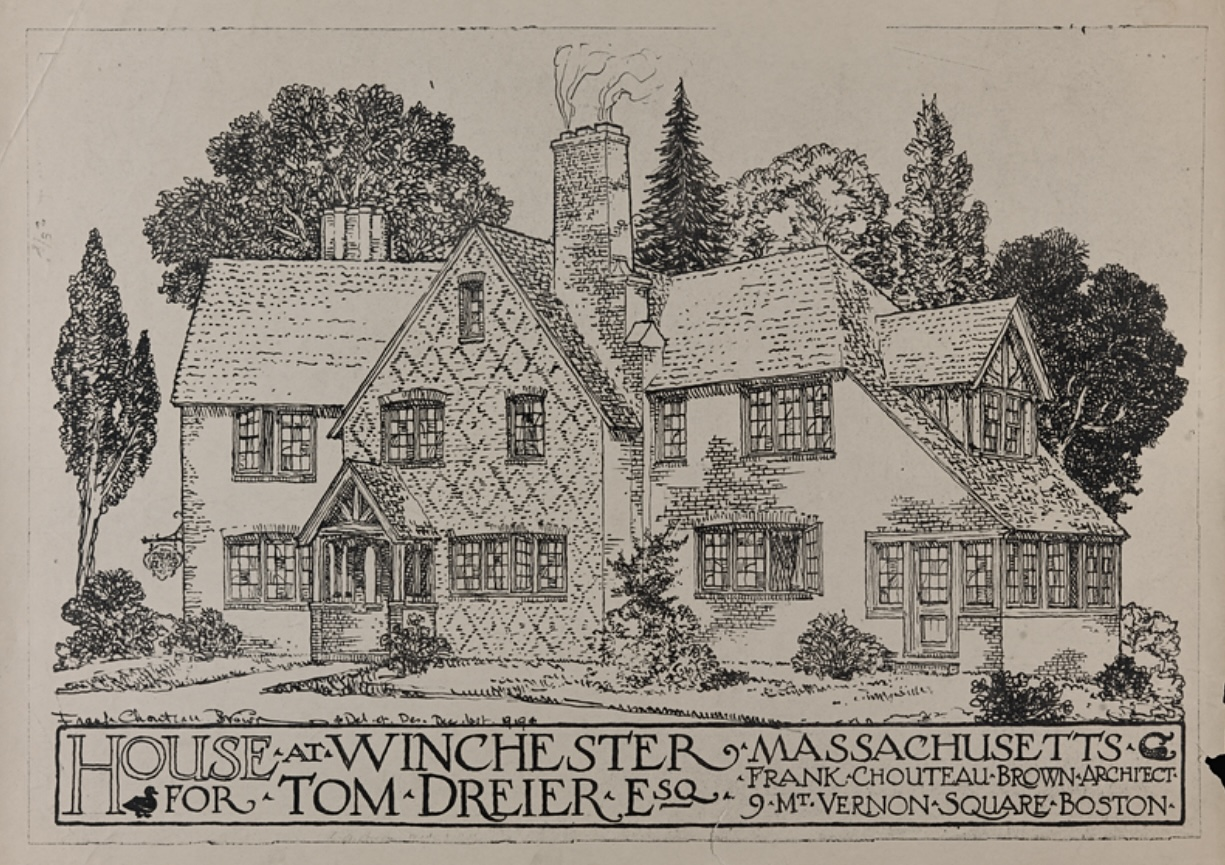
Thomas Dreier House, 1924

Snug Gables is a historic house built for Thomas Dreier by Frank Chouteau Brown in Winchester, MA.

It was built in 1920 and named after Dreier's wife, Blanche "Snug" Dreier. Dreier ran the "Thomas Dreier Service" out of a print shop in the basement, which distributed advertising publications and motivational short stories to area business leaders. After Brown completed a project in 1923 to improve the grounds, it was featured in the August 1923 US edition of what was then known as Country Life Magazine.

The house was also featured in advertisements for La Touraine coffee in newspapers throughout New England and New York. One of these was titled "Where Thomas Dreier Lives and Works," describing the household's reputation for hospitality. Another version entitled "Mrs. Thomas Dreier Keeps Here 21 Separate Accounts" notes the organization and careful approach of the matriarch, which leads her to serve La Touraine coffee.

Dreier wrote "Sunshine on the Business Trail" at Snug Gables, and several of the short stories within describe the house. Short works by Dreier are engraved on bronze plaques around the property.

The Dreiers sold Snug Gables in 1933. After several short term tenants, and the Armstrong and Knox families, each of which owned it for more than a decade, it was purchased in 1968 by the noted physician Alexander Leaf. It remained in the Leaf family until shortly after Alexander's death in 2013.

Mr. Brown's architectural drawings and photos of the house are on file at Historic New England. Mr. Dreier's records also contain detailed information about the property, and are on file at the University of South Florida.

Snug Gables is listed in the Society of Architectural Historians "Buildings of Massachusetts: Metropolitan Boston."

== Sources ==
- Set of architectural drawings of the Thomas Dreier House, Winchester, Mass., 1924
- Thomas Dreier collection
- "A House for Work and Play", by Frank Chouteau Brown, Country Life Magazine, August, 1923
