= Hartman Rocks Recreation Area =

Recreation area near Gunnison, Colorado, United States

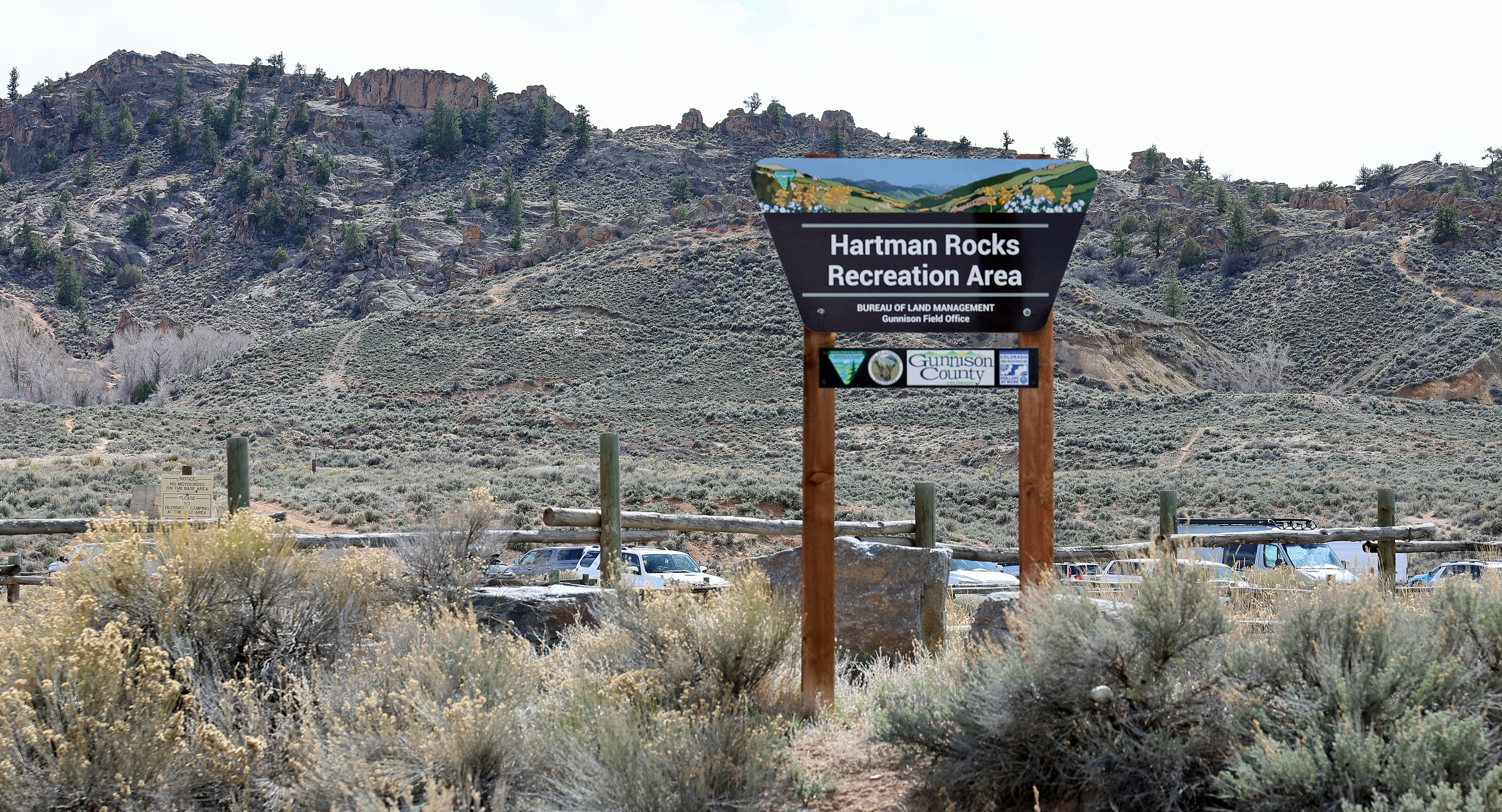

- Location within Colorado
- Location: Gunnison County, Colorado
- Nearest city: Gunnison, Colorado
- Coordinates: 38°30′21″N 106°56′30″W
- Area: 14,000 acres (57 km^{2})
- Elevation: 7,700 feet (2,300 meters) (Trailhead)
- Max. elevation: 8,390 feet (2,560 meters)
- Named for: Alonzo Hartman
- Governing body: Bureau of Land Management; Gunnison County; City of Gunnison
- Website: blm.gov

Hartman Rocks Recreation Area lies three miles (4.8 km) south of Gunnison, Colorado. The area provides open space for a wide variety of outdoor sports, including mountain biking, rock climbing, and camping. The 45 miles (72 kilometers) of singletrack trails attract mountain bikers, dirt bikers, hikers, and trail runners. The 45 miles (72 kilometers) of roads are popular with operators of 4x4 trucks, ROVs (recreational off-highway vehicles), and ATVs. The numerous granite outcrops provide space for rock climbing and bouldering. The recreation area occupies over 14,000 acres (5,700 hectares) of public lands managed by the Bureau of Land Management, plus about 140 acres (57 hectares) owned by the City of Gunnison and Gunnison County at the base area, where the parking lot and restrooms are. There are also about 50 primitive campsites available on a no-fee, first-come-first-served basis.

== Geology ==
The rocks at Hartman Rocks are granite, and they are over one billion years old. The area sits on a volcanic feature known as a ring dike.
