= Mount Whittier (New Hampshire) =

Mountain in New Hampshire, United States

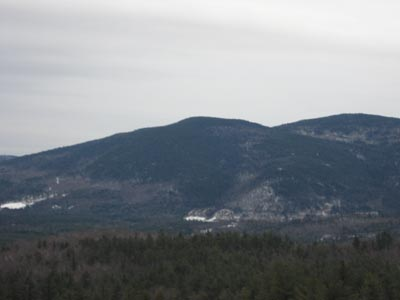

Highest point
- Elevation: 2,205 ft (672 m)
- Coordinates: 43°48′32″N 71°15′29″W

Geography
- Location: Tamworth, New Hampshire, U.S.
- Parent range: Ossipee Mountains
- Topo map: USGS Tamworth

Mount Whittier is a mountain in Carroll County, New Hampshire, in the northern Ossipee Mountains. Named after John Greenleaf Whittier, the peak is not to be confused with nearby Nickerson Mountain, which was once known as Mount Whittier.

There are no hiking trails on Mount Whittier. There was once a CCC alpine ski trail on the northern face.

== See also ==
- List of mountains in New Hampshire
