= Mount Whittier Ski Area =

Ski area in New Hampshire, United States

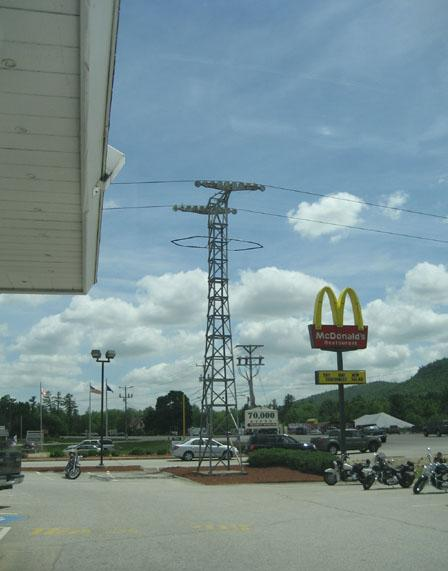
- A Mt. Whittier gondola tower in 2007
- Interactive map of Mount Whittier Ski Area
- Location: West Ossipee, New Hampshire, US
- Coordinates: 43°48′54″N 71°12′24″W
- Status: Closed (since 1985)
- Trails: 7
- Lift system: 6 lifts: 1 gondola, 5 surface lifts

Mount Whittier Ski Area was an alpine ski area located in West Ossipee, New Hampshire. Though it shared a name with a nearby mountain in the Ossipee Range, the ski area was actually located on Nickerson Mountain.

== History ==
While the exact opening date is not known, the ski area was in operation by the end of the 1940s, serviced by surface lifts. In 1963, New Hampshire's second gondola lift was installed at Mt. Whittier. The gondola was unusual in that it had three terminals—a bottom terminal on the east side of Route 16, a second lower terminal at the base of the ski area, and a top terminal near the summit of Nickerson Mountain. The remains of the gondola, including the towers and cables, still cross Route 16 today.

In addition to the ski operation, Mt. Whittier also offered summer activities, anchored with scenic gondola rides. Additional summer attractions were offered toward the end of the area's life, including slides and bumper boats. Poor winters in the early 1980s, along with a lack of snowmaking, led to the demise of the ski area.

Though the ski area has been closed since 1985, its lifts and trails are still visible from Route 16. There have been various attempts at restarting snow sports at the former site, including snow tubing, snowcat skiing, and snowmobile racing. As of September 2023, the land was for sale with an asking price of $3.2 million.
