= Geneva Point Center =

Coordinates: 43°40′29″N 71°20′2″W

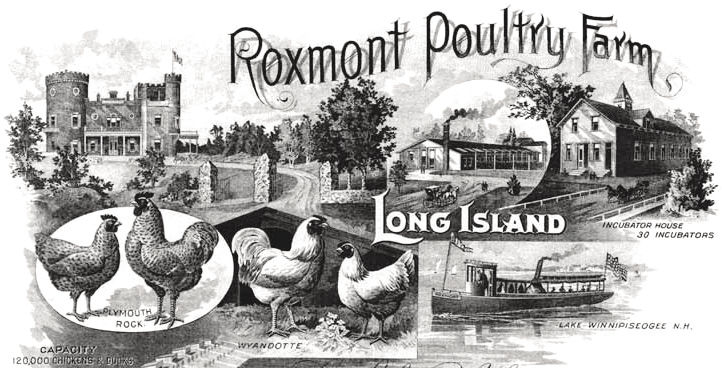
Undated Post Card: Roxmont Poultry Farm

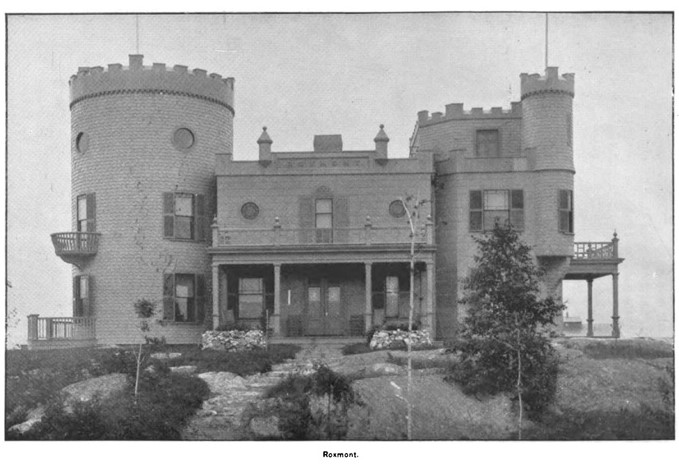
J.A. Greene residence at Roxmont Castle on Long Island, circa 1900 (burned and lost 1932)

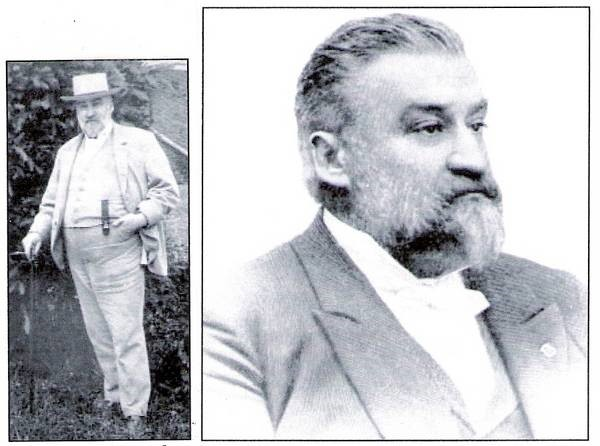
Dr. J.A. Greene, circa 1900

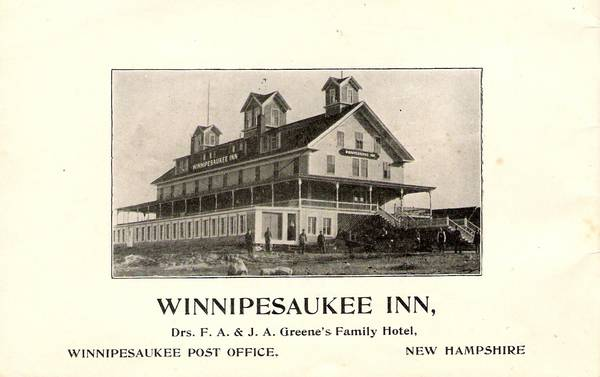
Tourism brochure title page featuring the Winnipesaukee Inn circa 1907

Geneva Point Center (GPC) is a historic non-profit conference center and summer camp in a natural northern New England setting. Located in the town of Moultonborough, New Hampshire, the campus includes 184 acres (74 ha) of wooded nature trails and one mile of lakeshore on Lake Winnipesaukee. There are more than 90 structures on the site, including cabins, small family cottages and private lodge rooms. The property has the historic Winnipesaukee Inn (circa 1907). The oldest existing structure is a barn documented to exist in 1839 and is likely much older, perhaps even 18th century (restored in 2021). The center has a long-running summer season ice cream shop that is open to the public.

The center has a previous Ecumenical history that is honored even today.

== 1890–1919: early history ==
The first owner of what is now Geneva Point was Dr. Jared Alphonzo Greene (1845-1917). He was born in Vermont, brought up in Boston, served the Union in the Civil War as a Cavalry soldier from the Territory of Colorado, attended Medical School in Cincinnati, Ohio, and practiced medicine in St. Louis, MO. He was the son of physician and businessman Reuben Greene. In 1885, J.A. Greene and his brother, Dr. Frank Eugene Greene, inherited control of the lucrative "Botanic Medicine" business upon the retirement of their father. The business had offices in Boston and New York City, and made many elixirs advertised as natural and descended from "Indian Doctor" remedies. In 1890, Dr. J.A. Greene purchased four adjoining farm properties at Geneva Point, totaling 1,300 acres. At the same time he purchased the property, his brother Frank bought a large amount of land on nearby Long Island, developing it into a large estate called "Windermere". The 1892 New Hampshire Atlas confirms Dr. Greene's purchase, listing the Geneva Point area of Moultonborough as "Dr. J.A. Greene Roxmont Farm". Until his death in 1917, Dr. J.A. Greene became a prominent figure in the area. He built a large and opulent residence known as Roxmont Castle on nearby long island (burned and lost 1932), he owned the prestigious New Hotel Weirs in Laconia (burned and lost 1924), and served as Mayor of Laconia from 1901-1903

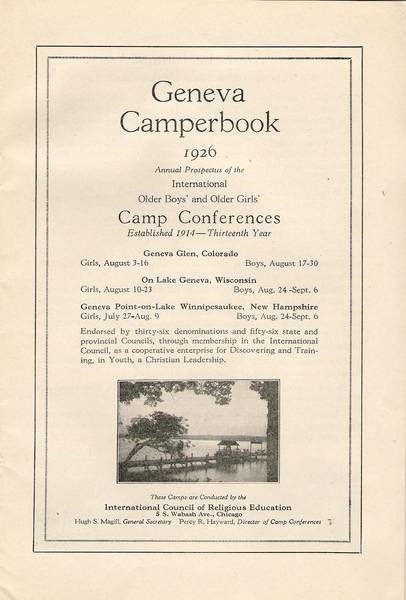
1926 "Camperbook" brochure Ecumenical era

The first commercial use of the property by Dr. Greene was as the "Roxmont Poultry Farm". At its peak, the farm produced 120,000 chickens and ducks annually. He purchased the steamer Roxmont to transport the poultry to many destinations on the lake. In 1907, Geneva Point was modified to attract the many summer visitors that were increasingly frequenting the lake. Tourism had been growing steadily since two rail spurs were added to the lake. The first was added by the Boston, Concord & Montreal Railroad, to Laconia's Weirs beach in 1849. That train station was relocated in 1859, and expanded in 1893. The second line was added in the 1880s, to Alton, by the Boston & Maine Railroad. The B&M added a new, expanded Alton train station in 1907. The BC&M railroad was acquired by the B&M railroad in 1915. This conversion of Geneva Point to a tourist destination was co-managed by Alphonzo and Frank. The historic Winnipesaukee Inn was built at this time, possibly expanded from an existing structure identified as "the grand barn" or "the horse barn". The Inn construction may have started as early as 1896 but was opened to the public in 1907. The Roxmont was converted to a passenger steamer, to shuttle passengers between the train stations and the new Inn.

== 1919–1986: ecumenical camp era ==
In 1919, The property was sold, becoming a unique camp that continues to present day. The first ownership was the "International Sunday School Association", which merged in 1922 with the "International Council of Religious Education (ICRE)". In 1960, the ICRE became part of the National Council of Churches. The campus was used by many Ecumenical organizations over those years, and most of the growth and building occurred during this time. In 1966, the name was changed to Geneva Point Center. The largest groups during the ecumenical era were youth camps.

Upon the existing Winnipesaukee Inn and original Barn, the many grouped cabins were added, as well as the following larger structures:

- The large two-story Chapel (1930)
- The Lakeview Lodge (1966)
- The Gibbes House (1981)

== 1986: modern era ==
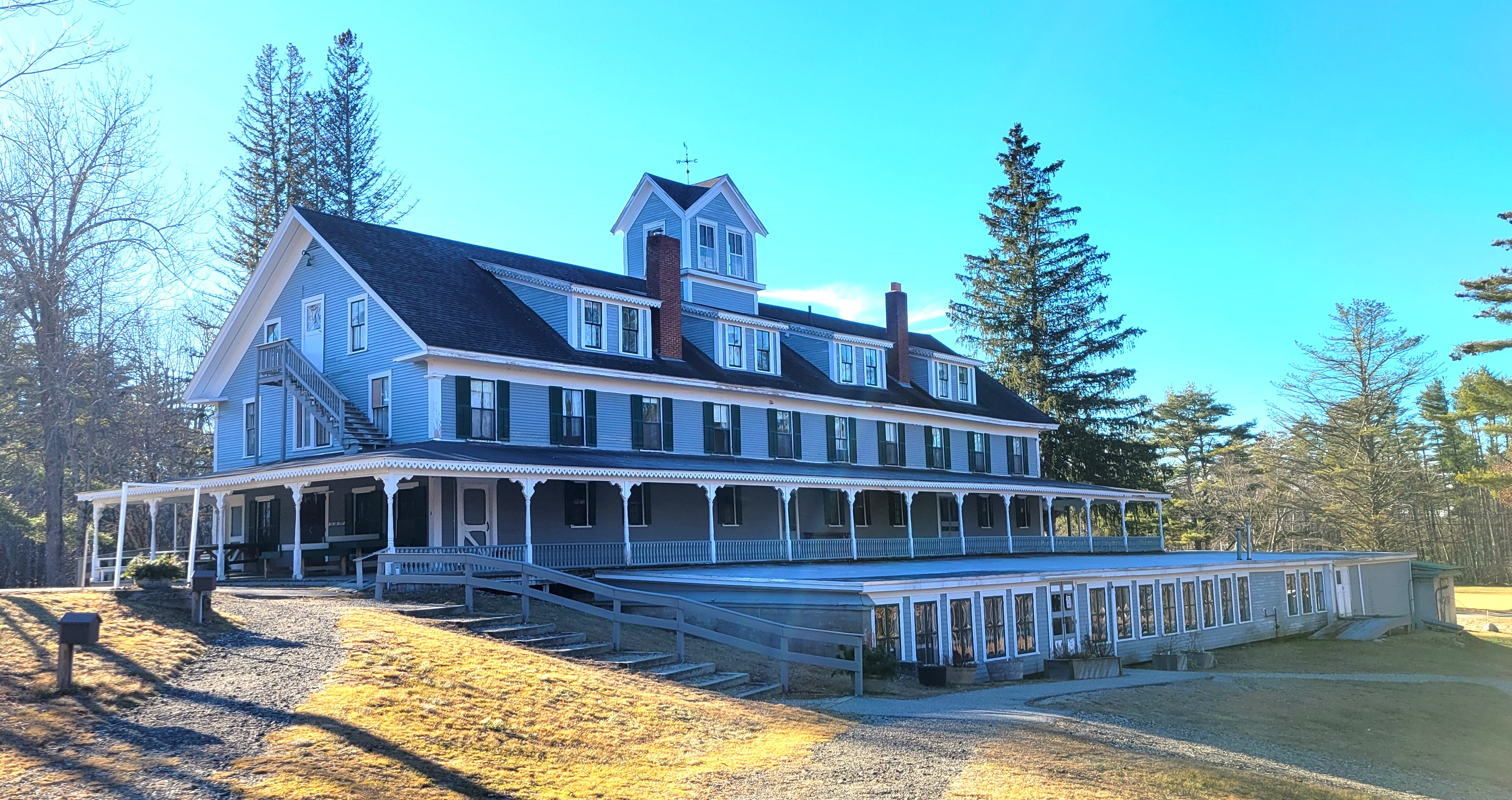
Winnipesaukee Inn 2024

In 1986, ownership was transferred to the current non-profit ownership "Geneva Point Center, Inc." The original role of the center has been generally maintained. The largest number of clients represent other non-profit organizations, many of which are still Ecumenical. In addition, there are Family Camps and Conferences, Weddings, and a number of academic and club association meetings. The "Meeting House" was opened in 2000 and provides banquet and event seating for up to 400. The Summer staffing is typically from local and (H-2B) international staff.
