= Turtleback (disambiguation) =

Turtleback is the common name for plants in the genus Psathyrotes.

Turtleback may also refer to:

== Places ==
- Turtleback Falls, North Carolina
- Turtleback Mountain, New Hampshire
- Turtle Back Zoo, New Jersey

== Other ==
- Turtleback tomb, a type of tomb found in China, Japan, and Vietnam
- A type of ship's deck that is curved to deflect water or shells – see turtleback deck
