= Moultonborough Town House =

- U.S. National Register of Historic Places
- NH State Register of Historic Places
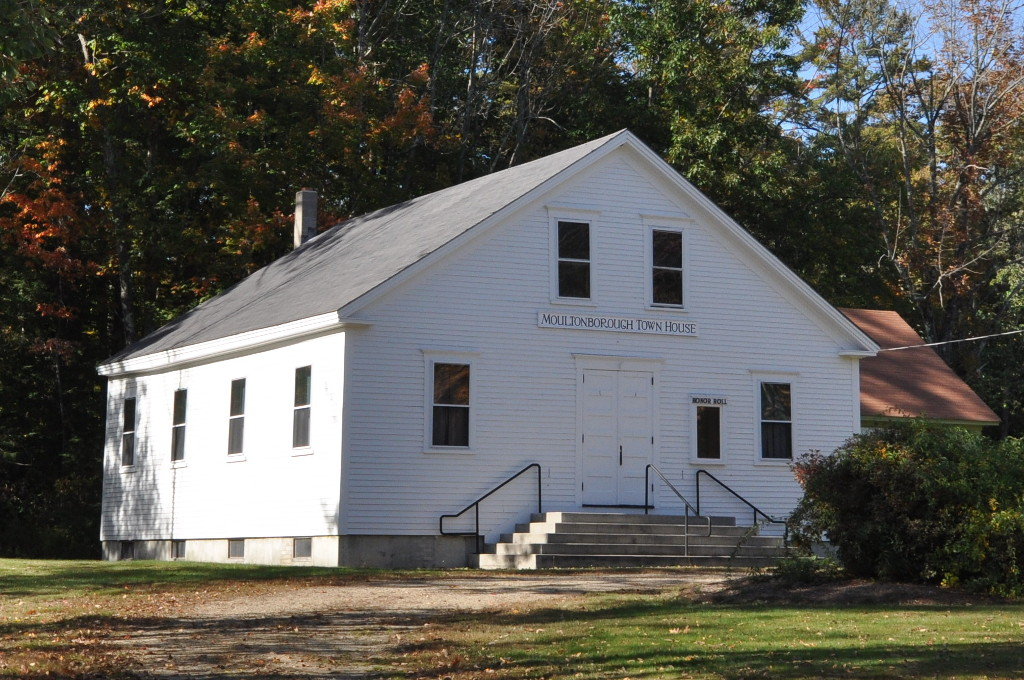

- Location within New Hampshire Location within the United States
- Location: NH 25, .3 mi. SW of NH 109, Moultonborough, New Hampshire
- Coordinates: 43°45′7″N 71°24′1″W
- Area: 0.7 acres (0.28 ha)
- Built: 1834
- Built by: Jonathan Hanson
- NRHP reference No.: 89002057

Significant dates
- Added to NRHP: December 1, 1989
- Designated NHSRHP: October 25, 2004

The Moultonborough Town House is the former town hall of Moultonborough, New Hampshire. It is located on New Hampshire Route 25 in Moultonborough's main village, and is now home to the local historical society. It was built in 1834, and is one of the oldest town hall buildings in Carroll County. It was listed on the National Register of Historic Places in 1989, and the New Hampshire State Register of Historic Places in 2004.

== Description and history ==
The former Moultonborough Town House is located on New Hampshire Route 25, a short way west of its junction with New Hampshire Route 109, in the village center. It is a single-story wood-frame structure, with a gabled roof, clapboarded exterior, and stone foundation. The main facade has a double-leaf center entrance, with sash windows flanking, and in the gable end above. The windows and entrance are topped by shallow projecting cornices. At the building corners, simple cornerboards rise to a boxed cornice and frieze. A small single-story ell projects to the rear. The interior of the building has a single large chamber, finished in vertical bead-board wainscoting and horizontal bead board above. A small kitchen area is in one corner, and the ell provides restroom facilities.

The town house built in 1834, and served as town hall until 1949, when town meetings were moved to a school auditorium. It was converted for use by the Moultonborough Historical Society in 1960. Its original interior appearance is not known due to the lack of documentation attending alterations made 1857, 1884, and in 1916. The property also includes a former district schoolhouse, moved there in 1987.

== See also ==
- National Register of Historic Places listings in Carroll County, New Hampshire
