= Mount Roberts (New Hampshire) =

Mountain in the American state of New Hampshire

Mt. Roberts
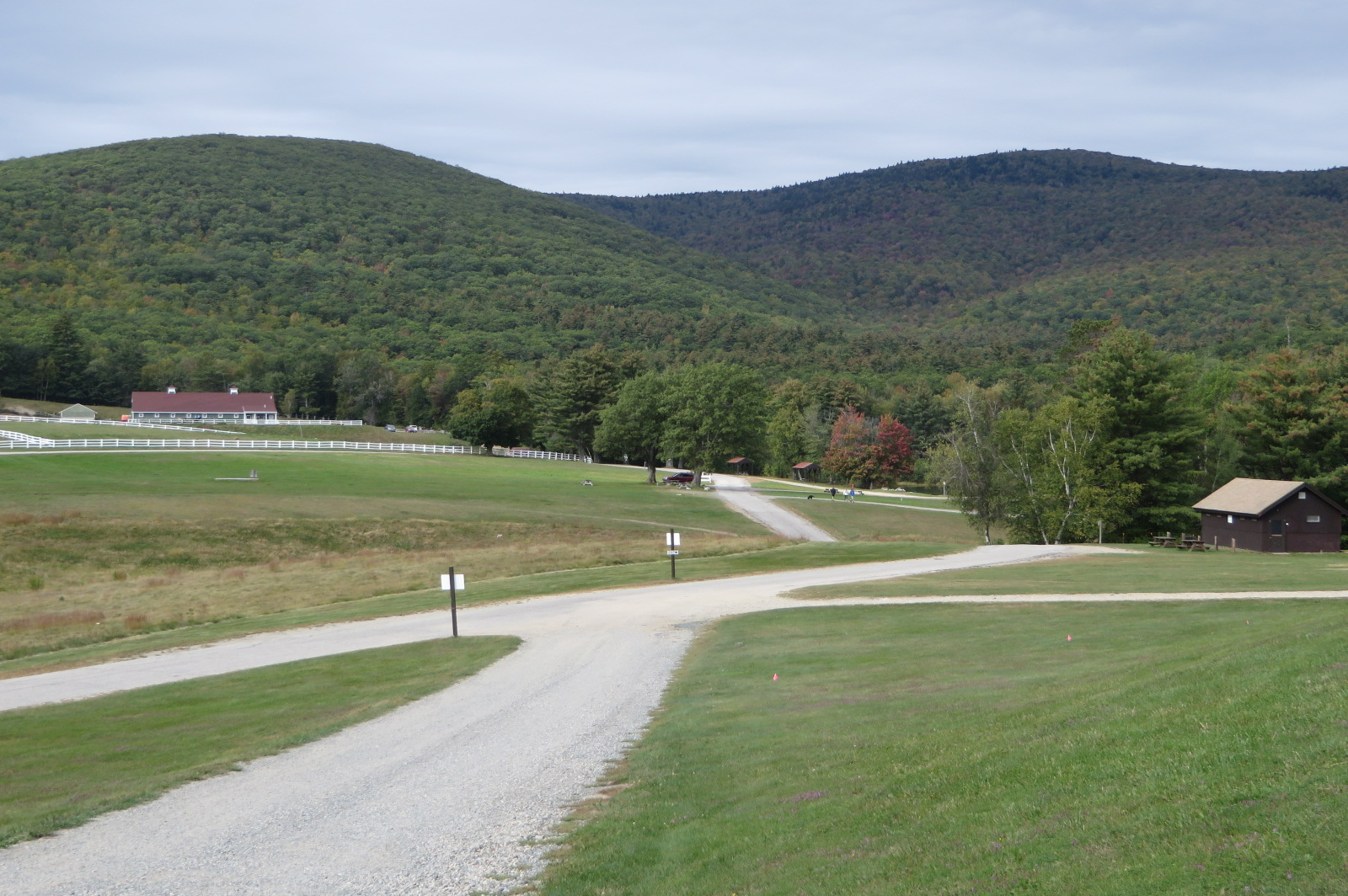
- Mt. Roberts (left) & Faraway Mountain (right) from Castle in the Clouds

Highest point
- Elevation: 2,582 ft (787 m)
- Coordinates: 43.7565°N 71.3265°W

Geography
- Location: Carroll County, New Hampshire, U.S.
- Parent range: Ossipee Mountains
- Topo map: USGS Tamworth

Climbing
- Easiest route: Mt. Roberts Trail

Mt. Roberts is a mountain located in Carroll County, New Hampshire. The peak is located within the Lakes Region Conservation Trust's Castle in the Clouds property.

== See also ==
- List of mountains in New Hampshire
