= Thomas Gustave Plant =

Canadian businessman (1859–1941)

Thomas Gustave Plant (1859–1941) was born in Bath, Maine, the son of immigrants from Canada East, who made his fortune manufacturing shoes under the Queen Quality Shoes label. His largest shoe factory, the Thomas G. Plant Shoe Factory (1896-1976), stood at the corner of Centre and Bickford streets in Jamaica Plain (a neighborhood of Boston, Massachusetts). Marketing materials from the factory proclaimed it to be the largest shoe factory in the world.

Thomas G. Plant Shoe Factory, circa 1900

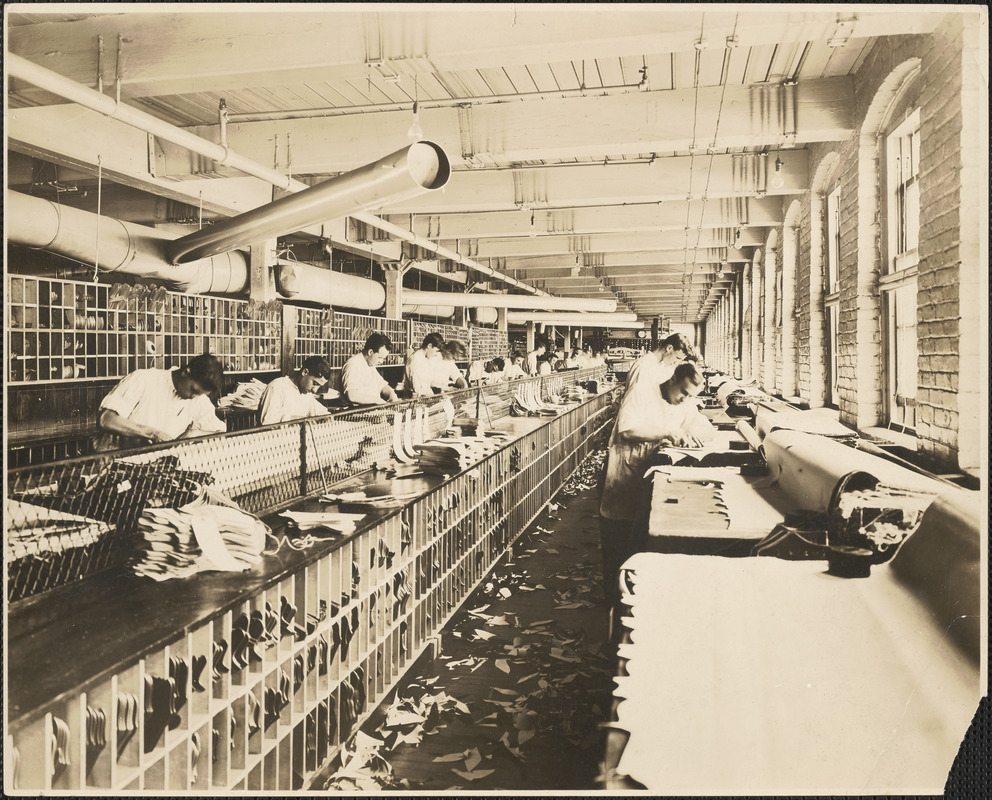
A section of the inner-sole room of the Thomas G. Plant Shoe Factory, ca. 1920–1960. Leon Abdalian Collection, Boston Public Library

The factory boasted numerous innovations and amenities for its workers, including an adjacent park at the corner of Centre and Walden streets. The park was designed by Frederick Law Olmsted Jr., and completed in 1913. He also started a nursery and kindergarten on site, for the children of his workers.

Plant used his fortune to build Lucknow (now known as Castle in the Clouds), an estate on a mountain overlooking Lake Winnipesaukee in Moultonborough, New Hampshire, where he lived with his second wife. Plant lost a considerable amount of his wealth investing in Russian bonds and in Cuban sugar, and then went into bankruptcy following the collapse of the stock exchange in 1929. His creditors allowed him to live in his home even as they dissolved his estate. Nearly the entire estate and its grounds have been repurchased by a preservation trust, and is now known as the Castle in the Clouds, a tourist attraction.

The factory changed hands several times in the 20th century, and by the 1970s was used as artist workspaces. It burned in 1976 in a dramatic fire, the burned-out hulk becoming known locally as "the ruins." The site was redeveloped in the 1990s as a strip mall and supermarket.

== The Plant Home ==
In 1917, Thomas Plant built The Plant Home, an assisted-living home, in Bath, Maine. His reasons for doing so have become the vision of the home.

"This home is founded on my sincere belief that those who have lived honest, industrious lives and are without means or friends to care for them, have earned the right to be cared for. Only through the labor and expenditures of others is it possible..."

Mr. Plant endowed the home with 3,300 shares of his shoe company, equating to $400,000 at the time. The home sits on the banks of the Kennebec River in Bath and provides private apartments and assisted-living care to low-income elders.
