= Windermere (Moultonborough, New Hampshire) =

Historic house in New Hampshire, United States

- U.S. National Register of Historic Places
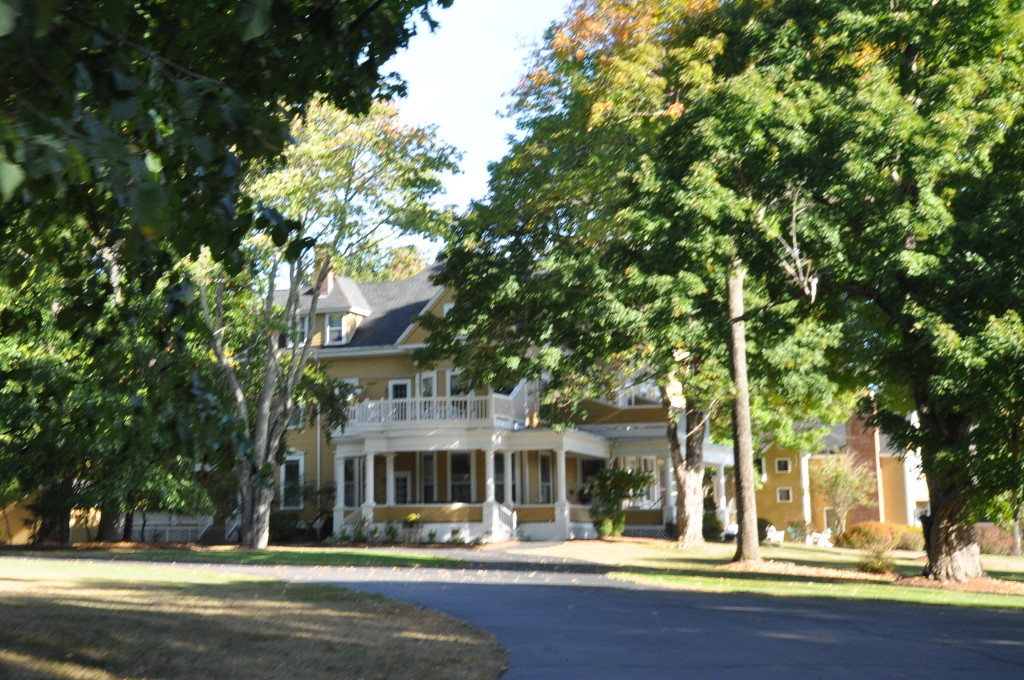

- Location within New Hampshire Location within the United States
- Location: Old Long Island and Windermere Rds., Moultonborough, New Hampshire
- Coordinates: 43°38′4″N 71°20′36″W
- Area: 5 acres (2.0 ha)
- Built: 1891
- Architect: Besarick, J.H.
- Architectural style: Colonial Revival, Queen Anne
- NRHP reference No.: 79000195
- Added to NRHP: November 14, 1979

Windermere was a historic summer estate at the southern tip of Long Island, the largest island in New Hampshire's Lake Winnipesaukee. Developed in the early 1890s, it was one of the largest country estates on the lake's shores. The main house, a three-story mansion built in 1891–92 by Frank Eugene Greene, is the most elaborate such house built in Moultonborough. A 5-acre (2.0 ha) remnant of the estate, encompassing the former main house and some outbuildings, was listed on the National Register of Historic Places in 1979. The property is now a residential condominium.

== Description and history ==
Lake Winnipesaukee, New Hampshire's largest lake, is roughly shaped like a three-fingered hand, the fingers pointing approximately north. The right two fingers are separated by the Moultonborough Neck, from which a narrow channel separates it from Long Island, the lake's largest island. Long Island juts more directly south, and it is roughly the southern third of the island that was the Windermere estate.

The island was farmed for much of the 19th century by a few families, the southernmost by Robert Lamprey until 1891, when he sold his holding to Frank Eugene Greene, a doctor who made and marketed patent medicines. He retained J.H. Besarick, an architect from Boston, to design his estate, which was built over a reported two-year period between 1891 and 1893. Materials for the buildings were brought to the site by boat, and the workmen doing the construction, said to number about 200, camped in tents.

The principal surviving elements of the estate complex are its main house, gatehouse/caretaker's cottage, two barns, an ice house, and a hen house. The main house is a large three-story wood-frame building, with a hip roof and clapboarded exterior. The building has massing that is Colonial Revival, and includes decorative features from Queen Anne and Shingle styles. When built, the house had all of the modern amenities of the time, include gas lighting. Fresh water was supplied from a water tank in the attic of the cow barn, which was supplied from the lake by a steam-powered pump.

The buildings of the complex today have been converted to residential use; the house has been subdivided into multiple residences.

== See also ==
- National Register of Historic Places listings in Carroll County, New Hampshire
