= Bayle Mountain =

Mountain in New Hampshire, United States

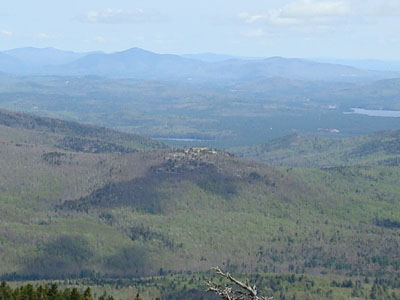

Highest point
- Elevation: 1,853 ft (565 m)
- Coordinates: 43°47′0″N 71°15′06″W

Geography
- Location: Ossipee, New Hampshire, U.S.
- Parent range: Ossipee Mountains
- Topo map: USGS Tamworth

Climbing
- Easiest route: Bayle Mountain Trail

Bayle Mountain is a mountain located in Carroll County, New Hampshire, standing above Conner Pond.

== See also ==
- List of mountains in New Hampshire
