= Frederick C. Aldrich =

American politician (1924–2018)

Mayor of Lebanon, New Hampshire
- In office 1972–1973

Member of the New Hampshire House of Representatives
- In office 1975–1976

Member of the New Hampshire House of Representatives from the Grafton 14th district
- In office 1976–1980

Personal details
- Born: Frederick Cecil Aldrich; September 30, 1924 Moultonboro, New Hampshire, U.S.
- Died: October 20, 2018 (aged 94) Lebanon, New Hampshire, U.S.
- Party: Republican
- Spouse: Margaret Aldrich
- Education: Keene State College; University of Vermont

Frederick Cecil Aldrich (September 30, 1924 – October 20, 2018) was an American politician. A member of the Republican Party, he served as mayor of Lebanon, New Hampshire from 1972 to 1973 and in the New Hampshire House of Representatives from 1975 to 1980.

== Life and career ==
Aldrich was born in Moultonboro, New Hampshire, the son of Cecil Gerald Aldrich and Marion Carrie Smith. He attended Lebanon High School, graduating in 1942. After graduating, he served in the armed forces during World War II, which after his discharge, he attended Keene State College, graduating in 1949. He also attended the University of Vermont, earning his master's degree in 1959.

Aldrich served as mayor of Lebanon, New Hampshire from 1972 to 1973. After his service as mayor, he served in the New Hampshire House of Representatives from 1975 to 1980.

== Death ==
Aldrich died on October 20, 2018, in Lebanon, New Hampshire, at the age of 94.
