= Larcom Mountain =

Mountain in New Hampshire, United States

- Location within New Hampshire

Highest point
- Elevation: 2,093 ft (638 m)
- Prominence: 453 ft (138 m)
- Coordinates: 43°48′19″N 71°19′15″W

Geography
- Location: Carroll County, New Hampshire, U.S.
- Parent range: Ossipee Mountains
- Topo map: USGS Tamworth

Larcom Mountain is a mountain located in Carroll County, New Hampshire, USA. The top of the mountain, and its subpeak, Little Larcom Mountain, are part of the Lakes Region Conservation Trust.

The mountain is named after poet Lucy Larcom, who visited the area frequently while staying at the Bearcamp River House.

== Hiking ==
There are no public trails to the peak, as of 2025.

== See also ==
- List of mountains in New Hampshire
