= Suissevale, New Hampshire =

Census-designated place in New Hampshire, United States

- Census-designated place
- Location within New Hampshire Location within the United States
- Coordinates: 43°43′23″N 71°22′08″W
- Country: United States
- State: New Hampshire
- County: Carroll
- Town: Moultonborough

Area
  - Total: 1.18 sq mi (3.05 km^{2})
  - Land: 1.17 sq mi (3.04 km^{2})
  - Water: 0.0039 sq mi (0.01 km^{2})
- Elevation: 666 ft (203 m)

Population (2020)
  - Total: 328
  - Density: 279.6/sq mi (107.94/km^{2})
- Time zone: UTC-5 (Eastern (EST))
  - Summer (DST): UTC-4 (EDT)
- ZIP Code: 03254 (Moultonborough)
- Area code: 603
- FIPS code: 33-74780
- GNIS feature ID: 2629740

Suissevale is a private subdivision in the town of Moultonborough, New Hampshire, United States. It is located between New Hampshire Route 109 and Moultonborough Bay, an arm of Lake Winnipesaukee. The subdivision is listed as a census-designated place (CDP) and had a year-round population of 328 as of the 2020 census.

== Geography ==
Suissevale is in the east-central part of the town of Moultonborough, built on Birch Hill, which rises 180 feet (55 m) above Moultonborough Bay to an elevation of 692 feet (211 m) above sea level. Route 109 runs along the eastern edge of the community, leading northwest 3 miles (5 km) to Moultonborough village and southeast 14 miles (23 km) to Wolfeboro.

According to the U.S. Census Bureau, the Suissevale CDP has a total area of 1.2 square miles (3.1 km^{2}), of which 0.004 square miles (0.01 km^{2}), or 0.40%, are water.

== Demographics ==
Historical population
Census	Pop.	Note	%±
2010	249		—
2020	328		31.7%
U.S. Decennial Census

As of the census of 2010, there were 249 people, 115 households, and 87 families residing in the CDP. There were 546 housing units, of which 431, or 78.9%, were vacant on Census Day (April 1). 419 of the vacant units were for seasonal or recreational use. The racial makeup of the CDP was 97.6% white and 2.4% two or more races. 0.4% of the population were Hispanic or Latino of any race.

Of the 115 households in the CDP, 20.0% had children under the age of 18 living with them, 60.0% were headed by married couples living together, 8.7% had a female householder with no husband present, and 24.3% were non-families. 17.4% of all households were made up of individuals, and 7.0% were someone living alone who was 65 years of age or older. The average household size was 2.17, and the average family size was 2.36.

15.7% of residents in the CDP were under the age of 18, 2.7% were from age 18 to 24, 15.6% were from 25 to 44, 45.3% were from 45 to 64, and 20.5% were 65 years of age or older. The median age was 52.6 years. For every 100 females, there were 84.4 males. For every 100 females age 18 and over, there were 87.5 males.
