= Melvin River =

- Location within New Hampshire Location within the United States

Location
- Country: United States
- State: New Hampshire
- County: Carroll
- Town: Tuftonboro

Physical characteristics
- Source: Melvin Pond
  - location: Tuftonboro
  - coordinates: 43°42′34″N 71°12′57″W
  - elevation: 750 ft (230 m)
- Mouth: Lake Winnipesaukee
  - location: Melvin Village
  - coordinates: 43°41′15″N 71°18′19″W
  - elevation: 504 ft (154 m)
- Length: 8.1 mi (13.0 km)

The Melvin River is an 8.1-mile-long (13.0 km) river in the Lakes Region of central New Hampshire in the United States. It is a tributary of Lake Winnipesaukee, part of the Merrimack River watershed.

The Melvin River lies entirely within the town of Tuftonboro. It begins at the outlet of Melvin Pond, near the town's eastern border, and flows west along the base of the Ossipee Mountains to the north. The river reaches Lake Winnipesaukee at Melvin Village.

== See also ==
- List of rivers of New Hampshire
