= New Hampshire Troubadour =

Defunct American tourism magazine

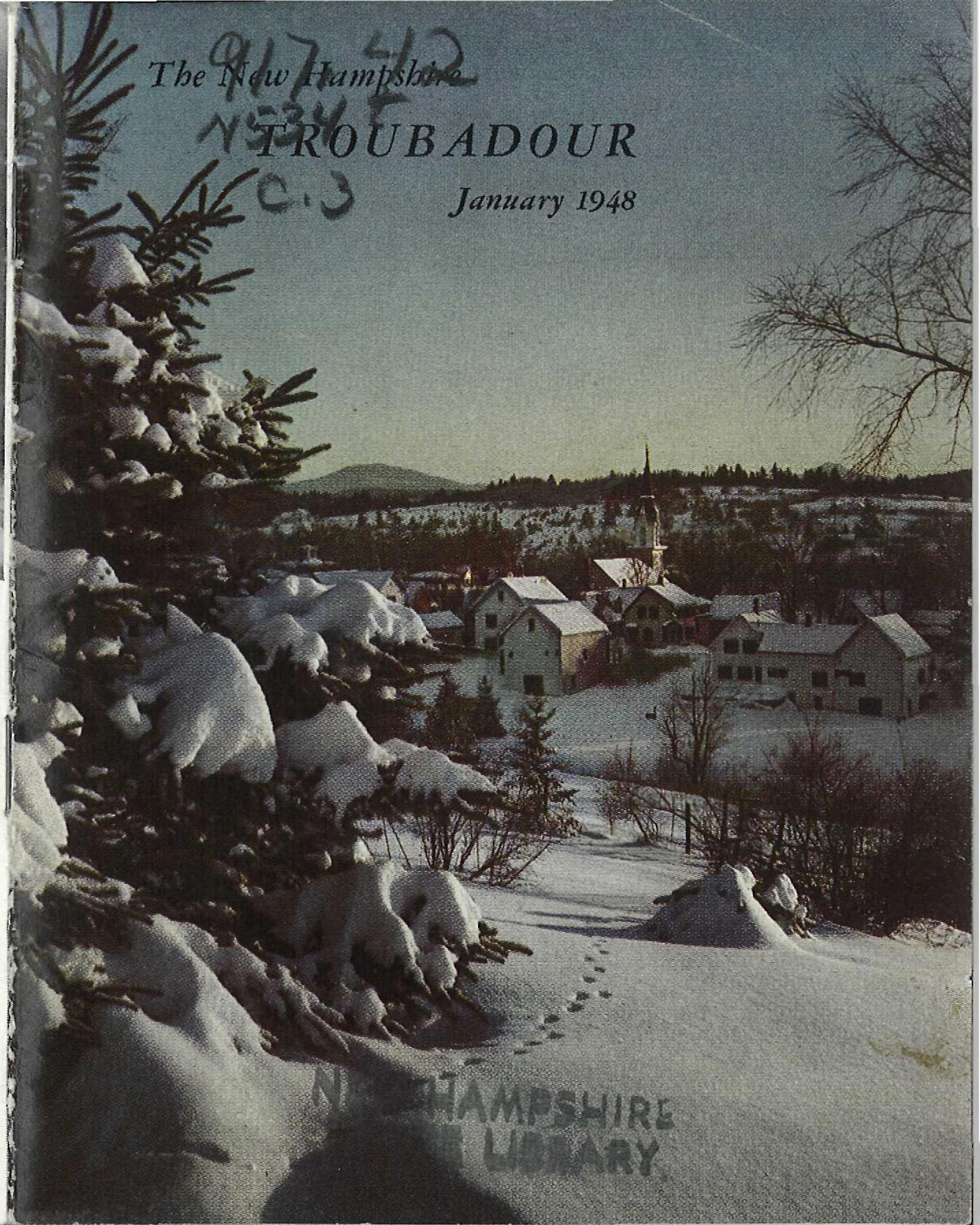
- January 1948 cover depicting Whitefield village center
- Former editors: Thomas Dreier
- Categories: Regional magazine
- Frequency: Monthly
- Founded: 1931
- First issue: January 1931
- Final issue: September–October 2011
- Country: United States
- Based in: Concord, New Hampshire
- Language: English
- Website: nhtroubadour.com
- OCLC: 57263657

The New Hampshire Troubadour was a monthly magazine supported by the State Planning and Development Commission of New Hampshire and which was originally published from 1931 to 1951. It was subsequently published under several private owners and titles, most prominently as New Hampshire Profiles.

It was briefly revived under the original name for a few years early in the twenty-first century, as a quarterly magazine published by a 501(c)(3) charitable organization with no paid employees.

The magazine's first editor was Thomas Dreier.

During the Troubadour's original run three covers were illustrated by American artist Maxfield Parrish.
