= Mirror Lake (Tuftonboro, New Hampshire) =

Lake in New Hampshire, United States

- Location within New Hampshire Location within the United States
- Location: Carroll County, New Hampshire
- Coordinates: 43°37′18″N 71°15′50″W
- Primary outflows: Tributary of Lake Winnipesaukee
- Basin countries: United States
- Max. length: 1.2 mi (1.9 km)
- Max. width: 0.8 mi (1.3 km)
- Surface area: 333 acres (1.35 km^{2})
- Average depth: 13 ft (4.0 m)
- Max. depth: 43 ft (13 m)
- Surface elevation: 509 ft (155 m)
- Settlements: Mirror Lake (village in town of Tuftonboro)

Mirror Lake is a 333-acre (1.35 km^{2}) water body located in Carroll County in the Lakes Region of central New Hampshire, United States, in the town of Tuftonboro. The lake connects by a short outlet stream (not navigable) to Lake Winnipesaukee. The resort community of Mirror Lake, a village in the town of Tuftonboro, occupies the lake's western shore.

== See also ==
- List of lakes in New Hampshire
