= Mirror Lake (Lake Placid) =

Lake in the state of Florida, United States

- Location within Florida Location within the United States
- Location: on south side of city of Lake Placid, Florida; city limits border south shore of lake
- Coordinates: 27°16′33″N 81°21′37″W
- Type: natural freshwater lake
- Basin countries: United States
- Max. length: 3,410 ft (1,040 m)
- Max. width: 1,720 ft (520 m)
- Surface area: 93.15 acres (38 ha)
- Max. depth: 41 ft (12 m)
- Surface elevation: 95 ft (29 m)

Mirror Lake, a figure-eight-shaped lake, has a surface area of 93.15 acres (377,000 m^{2}). This lake is on the south edge of the city of Lake Placid, Florida. The area immediately surrounding it is mostly rural, but there are housing developments abutting the lake on part of its south side. Mirror Lake Drive runs just south of the lake and just south of that is Lake Placid, a much larger lake.

Mirror Lake provides public access along part of its southern shore. There are no public boat ramps or public swimming beaches along this lake. This lake can be fished where there is public access, but there is no information about the variety of fish in the lake. This lake is one of several lakes in Florida named Mirror Lake.
