= Charles D. Griffin =

United States Navy admiral

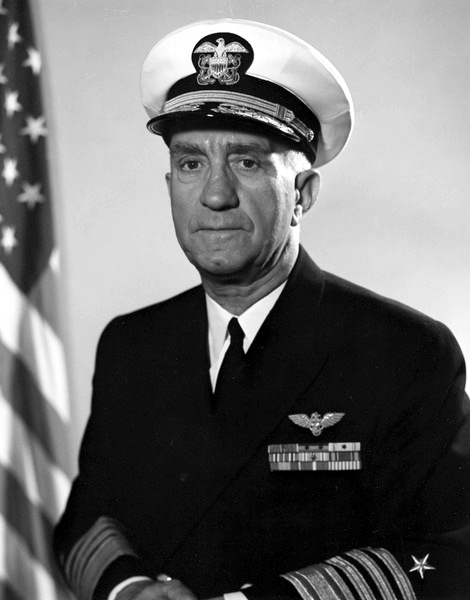
- Admiral Charles D. Griffin, commander in chief, Allied Forces Southern Europe, 1965–1968.
- Born: January 12, 1906; Philadelphia, Pennsylvania, U.S.
- Died: June 26, 1996 (aged 90); Melvin Village, New Hampshire, U.S.
- Education: University of Michigan
- Military career
- Allegiance: United States
- Branch: United States Navy
- Service years: 1927–1968
- Rank: Admiral
- Nickname: Don
- Commands: United States Naval Forces Europe; Allied Forces Southern Europe; United States Seventh Fleet; Carrier Division 4; USS Oriskany (CVA-34); USS Croatan (CVE-25); Carrier Air Group 9
- Conflicts: World War II; Korean War
- Awards: Navy Distinguished Service Medal (2); Bronze Star Medal

Admiral Charles Donald Griffin (January 12, 1906 – June 26, 1996) was a four-star admiral in the United States Navy who served as commander in chief of United States Naval Forces Europe from 1963 to 1965 and as commander in chief of Allied Forces Southern Europe from 1965 to 1968.

== Early career ==
Born in Philadelphia, Pennsylvania to Joseph Richard Griffin and the former Maude Spicknall, Griffin moved to Washington, D.C. as a child, where he graduated from Central High School in 1923. He graduated from the United States Naval Academy at Annapolis, Maryland in 1927 and was commissioned an ensign in the United States Navy.

After initial duty in battleships and destroyers from 1927 to 1930, Griffin underwent flight training and was designated a naval aviator in 1930. During the 1930s, he served in an air patrol squadron and as a scouting pilot aboard the heavy cruiser USS Chester (CA-27), and studied aeronautical engineering at the University of Michigan, where he received a master's degree in 1937. From 1937 to 1940, he was attached to Scouting Squadron Six aboard the aircraft carrier USS Enterprise (CV-6), then was a flight test officer at Naval Air Station Anacostia from 1940 to 1942.

=== World War II ===
During World War II, Griffin was commander of Carrier Air Group 9 aboard the aircraft carrier Essex from 1942 to 1943, participating in air raids on Marcus Island, Wake Island, the Marshall Islands, and Rabaul, for which he was awarded the Bronze Star Medal. In 1943, he became operations officer for Task Force 58 in the Pacific. He was detached in 1944 to plan operations in the Pacific theater as a member of the Joint War Plans Committee of the Joint Chiefs of Staff.

After the war, Griffin was commanding officer of the escort carrier USS Croatan (CVE-25) from 1945 to 1946, making two transatlantic trips to ferry troops home from France as part of Operation Magic Carpet, then served as operations officer aboard the aircraft carrier USS Franklin D. Roosevelt (CV-42). He was plans officer for the United States Atlantic Fleet from 1946 to 1947.

=== Revolt of the Admirals ===
Griffin played a key role in the Revolt of the Admirals, an incident of civil-military conflict over the long-term funding priorities of the armed services.

In September 1948, as a captain, Griffin received sudden orders to report to the Strategic Plans Division (OP-30) in the Department of the Navy as officer in charge of special projects.

That meant practically nothing to me when I heard this. It wasn't too long after I got back there that I got head over heels into the business of the so-called revolt of the admirals – the B-36 affair. I found that the special projects had to do with the preparation of statements for the chief of naval operations on very critical points.

In October 1949, Griffin was directed to prepare a position paper on the controversy for Chief of Naval Operations Louis E. Denfeld to present in testimony before the House Armed Services Committee. After placing the completed draft on Denfeld's desk, Griffin visited Denfeld's office every day to solicit feedback, but "it became quite apparent to me that Admiral Denfeld was not going to take any fast action on this because he, himself, was feeling his way along."

Finally, the day before Denfeld was scheduled to testify, Griffin received a call at 7 a.m. to appear at Denfeld's office at 8 a.m., where Griffin and three others were assigned to compose Denfeld's statement. Using Griffin's paper as a rough draft, the four men worked all day long, eating lunch and dinner in Denfeld's office.

The last page came out of the typewriter and was approved by Admiral Denfeld at three o'clock the following morning. He delivered the statement at ten o'clock that morning before the Armed Services Committee and Secretary of the Navy Matthews was just wild. I use that word deliberately...

Matthews relieved Denfeld as Chief of Naval Operations after hearing Denfeld's testimony, which contradicted the official positions of the civilian Defense Department leadership. Other navy officers who participated in the controversy also saw their careers stalled or ended, but Griffin emerged unscathed. "The other people involved in it didn't all get hurt. I didn't get hurt and it was well known, I think, that I had a lot to do with writing that statement."

=== Korean War ===
Griffin completed his tour in the Strategic Plans Division in 1950 and became a student at the National War College, from which he graduated in 1951. He served as plans officer for Commander Air Forces, United States Pacific Fleet from 1951 to 1953. He was commanding officer of the attack carrier USS Oriskany (CVA-34) from June 1953 to July 1954, operating with the Seventh Fleet to monitor the recent Armistice in Korea.

== Flag officer ==
Promoted to rear admiral, Griffin was appointed the first director of the Long-Range Objectives Group (OP-93) when the group was established in February 1955, then served as special assistant to the Chairman of the Joint Chiefs of Staff from 1955 to 1956, commanded Carrier Division 4 from 1957 to 1958, and was director of the Strategic Plans Division from 1959 to 1960.

=== Commander, Seventh Fleet ===
Griffin commanded the United States Seventh Fleet from March 7, 1960, to October 28, 1961. With 125 warships and 500 aircraft, the Seventh Fleet constituted the world's most powerful peacetime naval force, and its role was to concentrate so much United States naval and air power in the Pacific as to reduce the likelihood of war. Asked whether the Seventh Fleet had enough power for this purpose, Griffin admitted, "I've never seen a military commander say he had everything he wanted. It is just not the nature of the beast."

In 1960, after rioting in Japan forced the unexpected collapse of President Dwight D. Eisenhower's planned visit to Tokyo, the President sailed to Taiwan aboard the heavy cruiser USS Saint Paul (CA-73) along a course that took him within 150 miles (240 km) of the potentially hostile mainland China, escorted by a Seventh Fleet protective force that included 100 planes, the aircraft carriers USS Yorktown (CV-10) and USS Ticonderoga (CV-14) and four destroyers. Griffin reassured newsmen that there was no indication of any unusual activity on the part of the Chinese Communists, but added that the motto of the Fleet was readiness and in the event of any threat the Fleet was ready to strike; in particular, should any submarine make any hostile move against the President and his escort force, he would do his best to destroy it. "The first thing I would do would be to get the St. Paul out of here as fast as possible."

In 1961, President John F. Kennedy moved the carriers of Griffin's Task Force 77 into the South China Sea, where Griffin conducted naval exercises in response to the escalating crisis in Laos.

=== Deputy Chief of Naval Operations ===
Griffin was a leading candidate to succeed Chief of Naval Operations Arleigh Burke in 1961. Burke ranked Griffin high on a list of forty admirals that Burke submitted to Secretary of the Navy John B. Connally Jr. as eligible successors, and Newsweek rated Griffin's odds of succeeding Burke at 4 to 1. Burke was succeeded by Admiral George W. Anderson Jr. and Griffin became Anderson's deputy for fleet operations and readiness.

As deputy chief of naval operations for fleet operations and readiness from 1962 to 1963, Griffin supervised an influential navy study that reversed the navy's previous stance on its nuclear propulsion program by accepting the view of Vice Admiral Hyman G. Rickover and the Atomic Energy Commission that nuclear power was not prohibitively expensive, and calling for the use of nuclear propulsion in all major surface ships, not just in submarines.

During the Cuban Missile Crisis, Griffin was one of three senior officers assigned by Anderson to monitor the navy's involvement in the crisis around the clock, and to act in Anderson's absence: "first, to make sure that the President and the Secretary of Defense were informed... and secondly, to prevent any civilian encroachments on military operations."

In 1963, Griffin was a candidate to succeed Admiral Robert L. Dennison as the four-star commander in chief of the Atlantic Fleet, under a proposal that would split that command from the unified Atlantic Command, which would go to Admiral Harold Page Smith. Although the Atlantic Fleet and Atlantic Command ultimately remained dual-hatted under Smith, Griffin gained his fourth star anyway when he was appointed commander in chief of United States Naval Forces Europe later that year.

=== Commander in Chief, United States Naval Forces Europe ===
In June 1963, Griffin was advanced to the rank of full admiral when he succeeded Admiral David L. McDonald as the triple-hatted Commander in Chief, United States Naval Forces Europe (CINCUSNAVEUR), Commander in Chief, United States Naval Forces, Eastern Atlantic and Mediterranean (CINCNELM), and United States Commander Eastern Atlantic (USCOMEASTLANT). He relinquished one of these hats when CINCNELM was disestablished on December 1, 1963. He was relieved by Admiral John S. Thach in March 1965.

=== Commander in Chief, Allied Forces Southern Europe ===
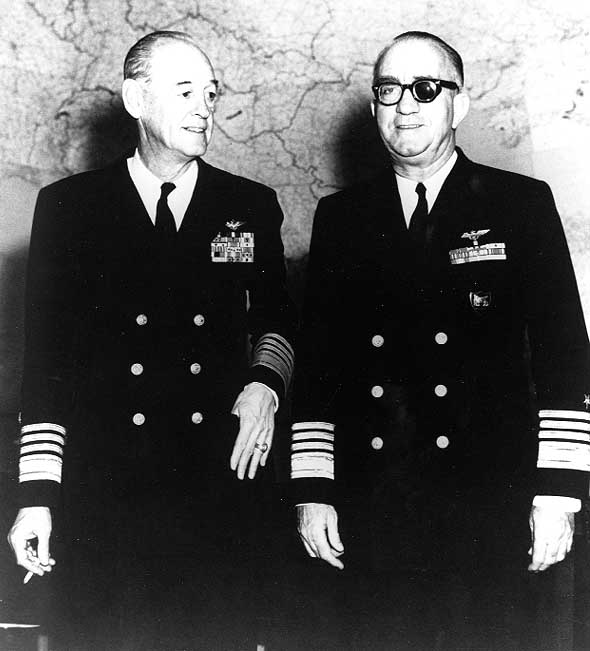
As commander in chief, Allied Forces Southern Europe (right), at his headquarters in Naples, Italy with Admiral John S. Thach, April 1967.

Griffin was Commander in Chief Allied Forces Southern Europe (CINCSOUTH) from March 31, 1965 to January 31, 1968, succeeding Admiral James S. Russell. As commander of all NATO forces in southern Europe, Griffin directed the land, sea and air forces deployed in the Mediterranean area by five nations: Italy, Greece, Turkey, Britain, and the United States.

While CINCSOUTH, Griffin frequently warned that Soviet efforts to undermine the Western position in the Middle East had "all the earmarks of a concerted effort to alter the strategic balance" as part of a broader campaign with the ultimate target of Europe. "While the Arab world is a rich prize in itself, Europe has been and remains the primary objective. A strong Soviet power position in the Mediterranean, supported by a string of client states along its southern shore, would give the Russians not only control of key resources essential to the European economy, but positions from which to menace the flow of shipping on which that economy's survival depends." However, Griffin's superiors in Washington remained convinced that the Soviet Union was not interested in a direct confrontation with American power.

Upon reaching the statutory retirement age, Griffin was relieved as CINCSOUTH by Admiral Horacio Rivero Jr. and retired from the navy effective February 1, 1968. At his retirement ceremony at his headquarters in Naples, Italy on January 31, 1968, Griffin asserted that the relatively peaceful Soviet posture in central Europe was a tactical move to cover a thrust of naval forces into the Mediterranean, and complained that France's recent withdrawal from NATO was tantamount to freeriding off the contributions of allies who met their treaty obligations.

NATO's great shield of collective security has become so broad that it even covers those who say they no longer choose to contribute to its support, giving them freedom to pursue their policy of withdrawal, secure in the knowledge that, in a showdown, they would still share the benefits of its great protection. This is obviously a game which only a few can play, for if all of us were to be so foolhardy, the alliance, as an effective institution, would cease to exist. Fortunately, this fallacy has found no imitators. And we may hope that it will be short-lived.

== Personal life ==
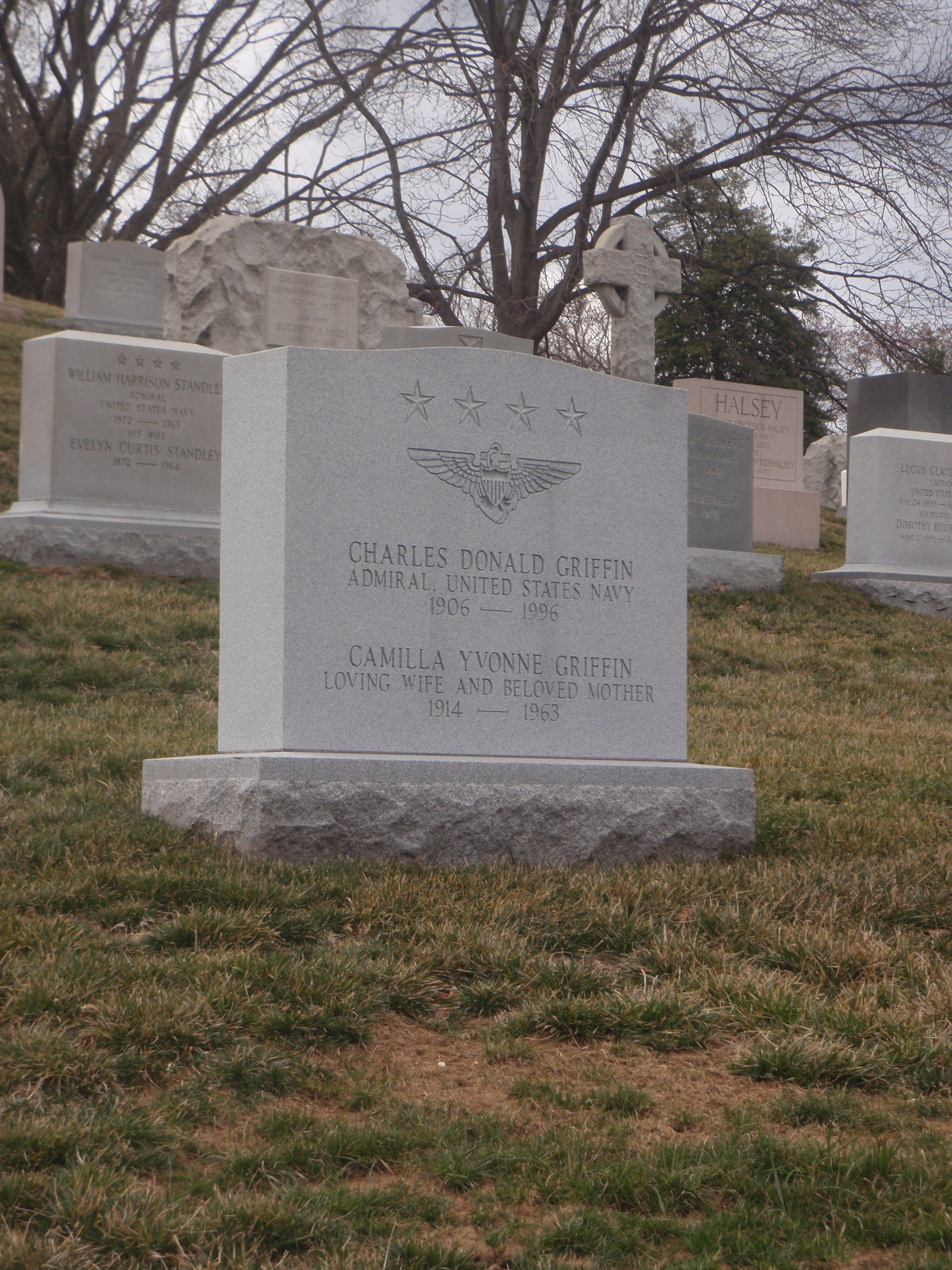
Admiral Griffin rests in Arlington National Cemetery.

Griffin married Camilla Yvonne Ganteaume on September 14, 1935; after her death at the age of 49 on August 10, 1963, he remarried to Marion Hopkins Schaefer on November 21, 1964. He and his first wife had two children: Linda Louise Griffin, and navy officer Charles Donald Griffin Jr.

After retiring from the navy, Griffin resided in Washington D.C., where he was a vestryman at St. Alban's Episcopal Church and a member of the Army and Navy Club and the Chevy Chase Club. He died of a heart attack at the age of 90 while playing golf at his summer residence, Bald Peak Colony Club, in Melvin Village, New Hampshire.

== Awards and honors ==

Naval Aviator Badge
Navy Distinguished Service Medal with one gold award star	Bronze Star Medal	Navy Presidential Unit Citation with two bronze service stars	American Defense Service Medal with service star
American Campaign Medal	Asiatic-Pacific Campaign Medal with service star	World War II Victory Medal	National Defense Service Medal with service star
Korean Service Medal	Order of George I, Supreme Commander (Greece)	Order of Merit of the Italian Republic, Knight Grand Cross	Philippine Legion of Honor, Commander
Order of Military Merit with silver star, degree unknown (South Korea)	Order of the Rising Sun, Gold and Silver Rays (5th class) (Japan)	Order of the Sacred Tripod, degree unknown (Republic of China)	United Nations Korea Medal

Griffin held the Gray Eagle Award as the senior active-duty aviator in the Navy from July 31, 1967, until his retirement on February 1, 1968.

Griffin is grandfather to Charles Donald Griffin III and Maria Griffin LeStage, and Donald Griffin Collins and Constance Yvonne ("Sam") Collins Nickell; and great-grandfather to Elizabeth Garner LeStage, Charles Richard Griffin LeStage, Cora Abigail Griffin, Donovan Collins, Kiley Collins, and Mackenzie Collins.

An oral history is archived at the United States Naval Institute.

Military offices
Preceded by David L. McDonald	Commander in Chief, United States Naval Forces Europe; 1963–1965	Succeeded by John S. Thach
Preceded by James S. Russell	Commander in Chief, Allied Forces Southern Europe; 1965–1968	Succeeded by Horacio Rivero Jr.
