= Frank Chouteau Brown =

American architect

Frank Chouteau Brown (January 1876–1947) was an American architect.

== Early life ==
Brown was born in Minneapolis, Minnesota, and educated at the Minneapolis School of Fine Arts, the Boston Art Club and in Europe.

== Career ==
In 1902, he began practice in Boston and from 1907 to 1919, was editor of the Architectural Review periodical. In 1916, he became a member of the faculty of Boston University and in 1919, head of the Department of Art and Architecture.

He was the architectural designer of the 1933 renovation of the Dillaway–Thomas House in Roxbury, Massachusetts.

== Selected bibliography ==
- Brown, Frank Chouteau (1902). Letters & Lettering; A Treatise with 200 Examples. Boston: Bates & Guild.
- ——— (1906). The Order of Architecture. Chicago: American School of Correspondence.
- ——— (1915). "New England Colonial Houses". The White Pine Series of Architectural Monographs. St. Paul, Minnesota: White Pine Bureau. p. 30.
- ——— (1923). Modern English Churches. Cleveland, Ohio: J. H. Jansen.
