= Turtleback Mountain =

Mountain in New Hampshire, United States

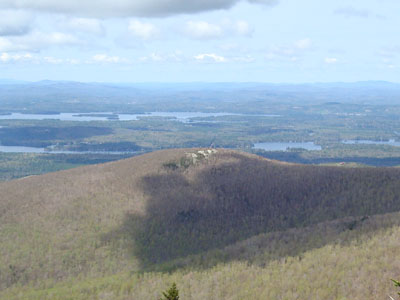

Highest point
- Elevation: 2,203 ft (671 m)
- Coordinates: 43°43′45″N 71°17′44″W

Geography
- Location: Carroll County, New Hampshire, U.S.
- Parent range: Ossipee Mountains

Climbing
- Easiest route: Turtleback Summit Trail

Turtleback Mountain is a 2,203-foot (671 m) mountain in the Ossipee Mountains located in Carroll County, New Hampshire, standing above Bald Knob. The summit features columnar jointing and was once home to an observation tower.

== See also ==
- List of mountains in New Hampshire
