= Ring dike =

Type of intrusive igneous body

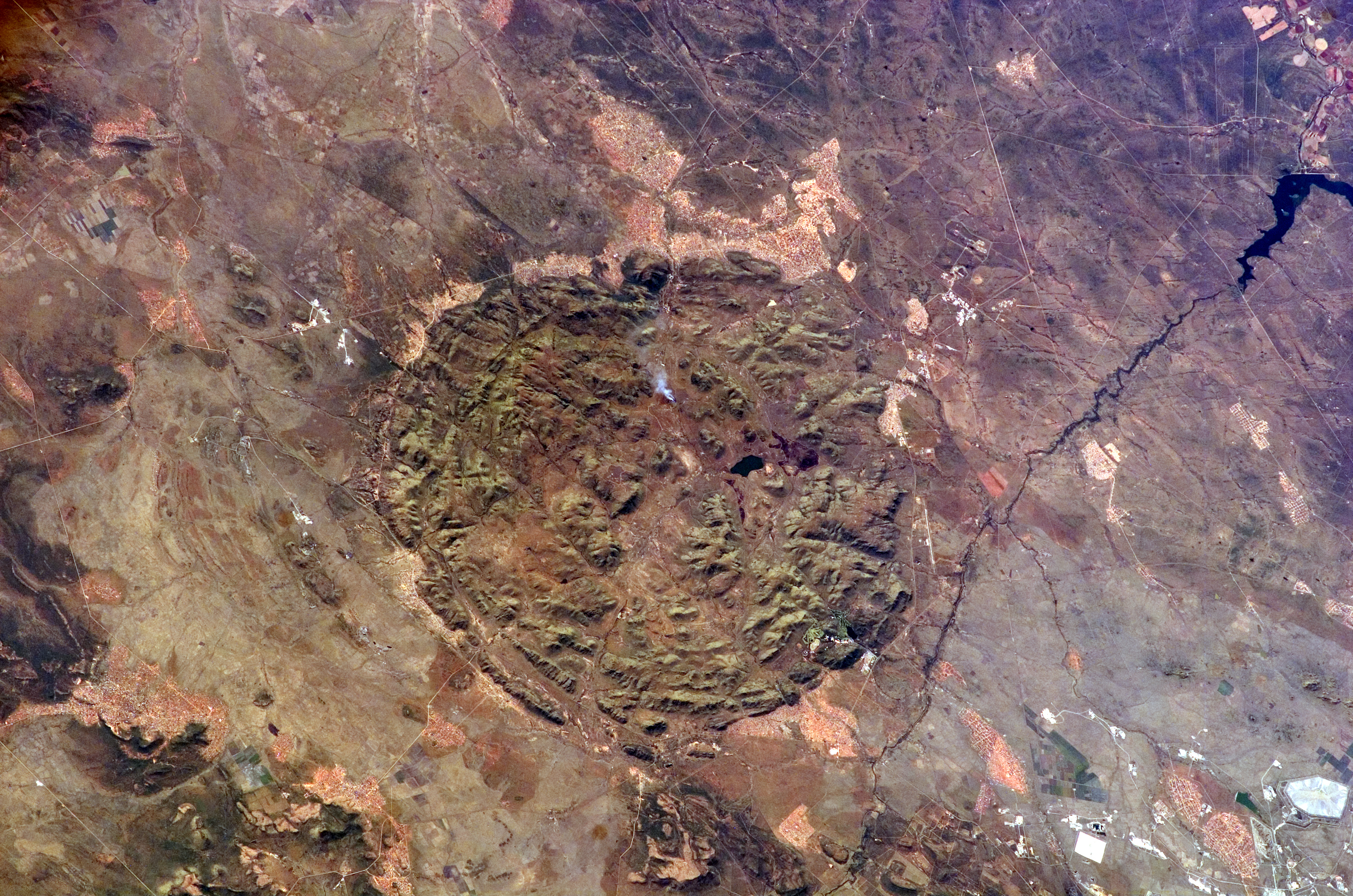
The Pilanesberg Ring Dike Complex in South Africa

A ring dike or ring dyke is an intrusive igneous body that is circular, oval or arcuate in plan and has steep contacts. While the widths of ring dikes differ, they can be up to several thousand meters. The most commonly accepted method of ring dike formation is directly related to collapse calderas.

== Caldera collapse and ring dike formation ==
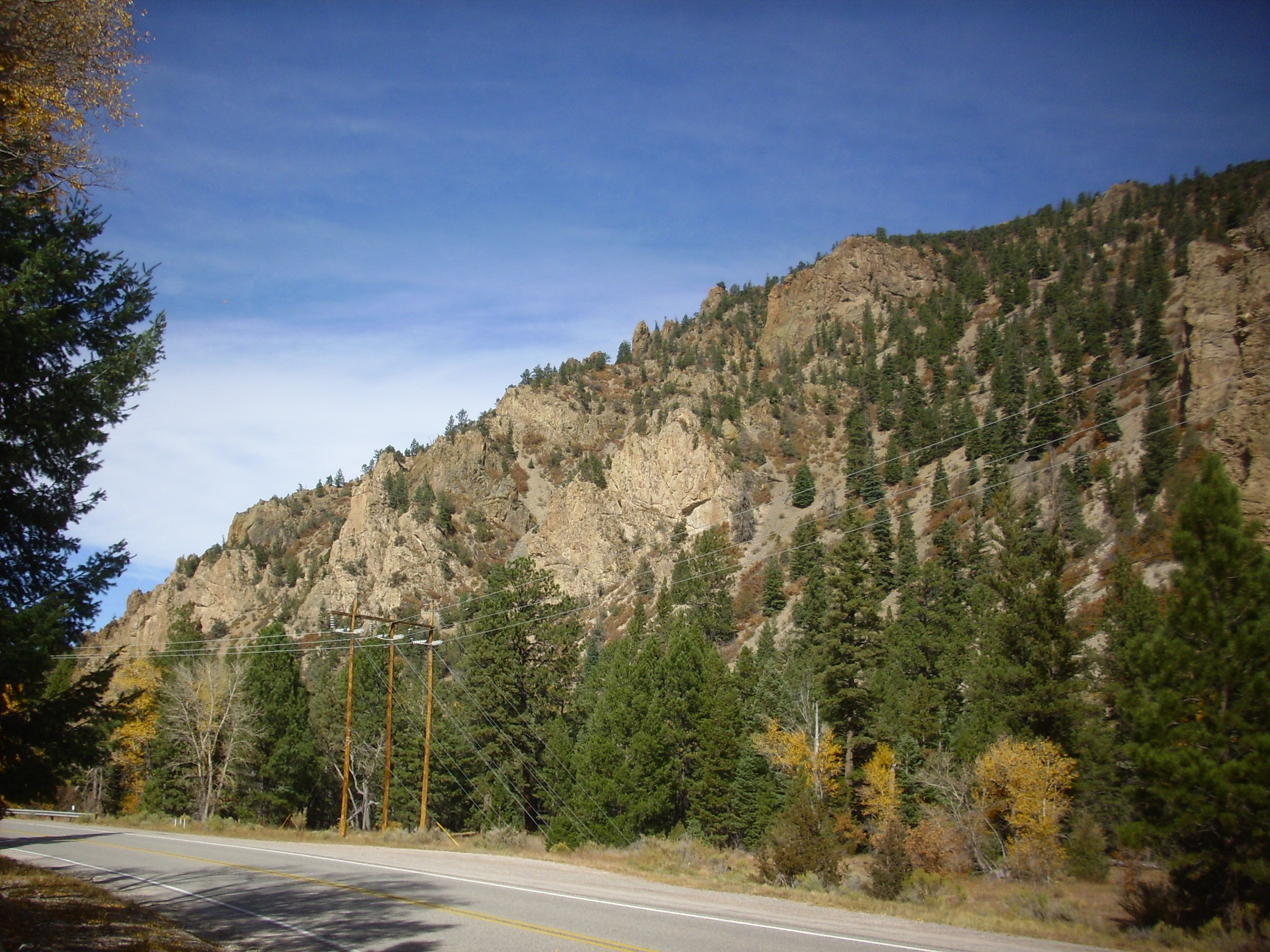
Questa Caldera ring dike, exposed in the valley of the Red River, New Mexico, US

Collapse calderas form due to the emptying of a magma chamber. Effusive eruptions that take place on the flanks of the associated volcano and a fissure system that direct magma away from the chamber are both mechanisms that can empty a magma chamber. As pressure in the magma chamber changes, an increase in tensile stresses create tension fractures at the surface of the volcano. The geometry of the top of the magma chamber dictates the location and magnitude of the tension fractures. In addition, it was found that the higher the radius to depth ratio of the magma chamber, the higher the probability of forming a collapse caldera.

Once a tension threshold is approached, the roof of the magma chamber collapses in on itself, and is known as cauldron subsidence. Tension fractures extend deeper in the profile and shear fractures or dip-slip faults form in a circular pattern around the caldera and are known as ring faults. Ring faults can be either vertical or steeply dipping faults. When they are inward dipping, they are known as normal faults and when they are outward dipping they are known as reverse faults. Ring faults then allow magma to rise through the fractures, forming a ring dike. These dikes can form as a direct result of collapse caldera formation, or through many injections around the ring fault over time. The magma of a ring dike is typically composed of acidic or intermediate composition due to the less dense melt that exists at the top of the magma chamber.

== Another mechanism of ring dike formation ==
It has been hypothesized that ring dikes may form when inclined sheets are captured within a ring fault system, which cause them to act as feeder dikes. The deflection of the sheets may be caused by the difference in material properties between and within the fault zone.

== Implications ==
Whether or not a caldera ring fault dips inward or outward from the center of subsidence is a highly contentious issue. Ring faults near the surface are subject to erosion and mass wasting, changing the morphology of the caldera walls and making it difficult to tell the dip of the fault at formation.

== Examples ==
=== Ossipee ring-dike complex ===
About 36 ring dikes have been found in the Ossipee Mountains in New Hampshire. Caldera subsidence appears to be the mechanism leading to the formation of some of the ring dikes, but not all of them. The composition ranges from monzonite to quartz syenite.

=== Loch Bà ring dike ===
The Loch Bà ring dike, found on the Isle of Mull in Scotland, serves as a classic example of a well formed ring dike. This intrusive body forms an oval and its diameter can be measured at roughly 5.8 km by 8.5 km. The width of the dike varies throughout the profile, with a maximum width of approximately 300 meters. The composition varies from rhyolite to felsite, with phenocrysts of alkali feldspar and mafic minerals.

== See also ==
- Batholith
- Cone sheet
- Fissure vent
- Laccolith
