= Nickerson Mountain =

Mountain in the U.S. state of New Hampshire

Coordinates: 43°48′05″N 71°12′55″W

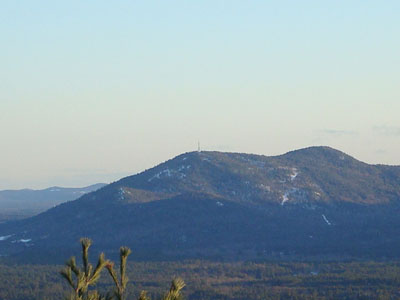

Highest point
- Elevation: 1,700 ft (520 m)

Geography
- Location: Ossipee, New Hampshire, U.S.
- Parent range: Ossipee Mountains
- Topo map: USGS Tamworth

Nickerson Mountain is a mountain located in Carroll County, New Hampshire, in the northeastern Ossipee Mountains. The peak was also once known as Mount Whittier; however, the USGS has since labelled a mountain to the immediate west with the name.

The Mount Whittier Ski Area and scenic gondola operated on Nickerson Mountain until 1985.

== See also ==
- List of mountains in New Hampshire
