= Castle in the Clouds =

Mansion and estate in New Hampshire

- Lucknow (Castle in the Clouds)
- U.S. National Register of Historic Places
- U.S. National Historic Landmark
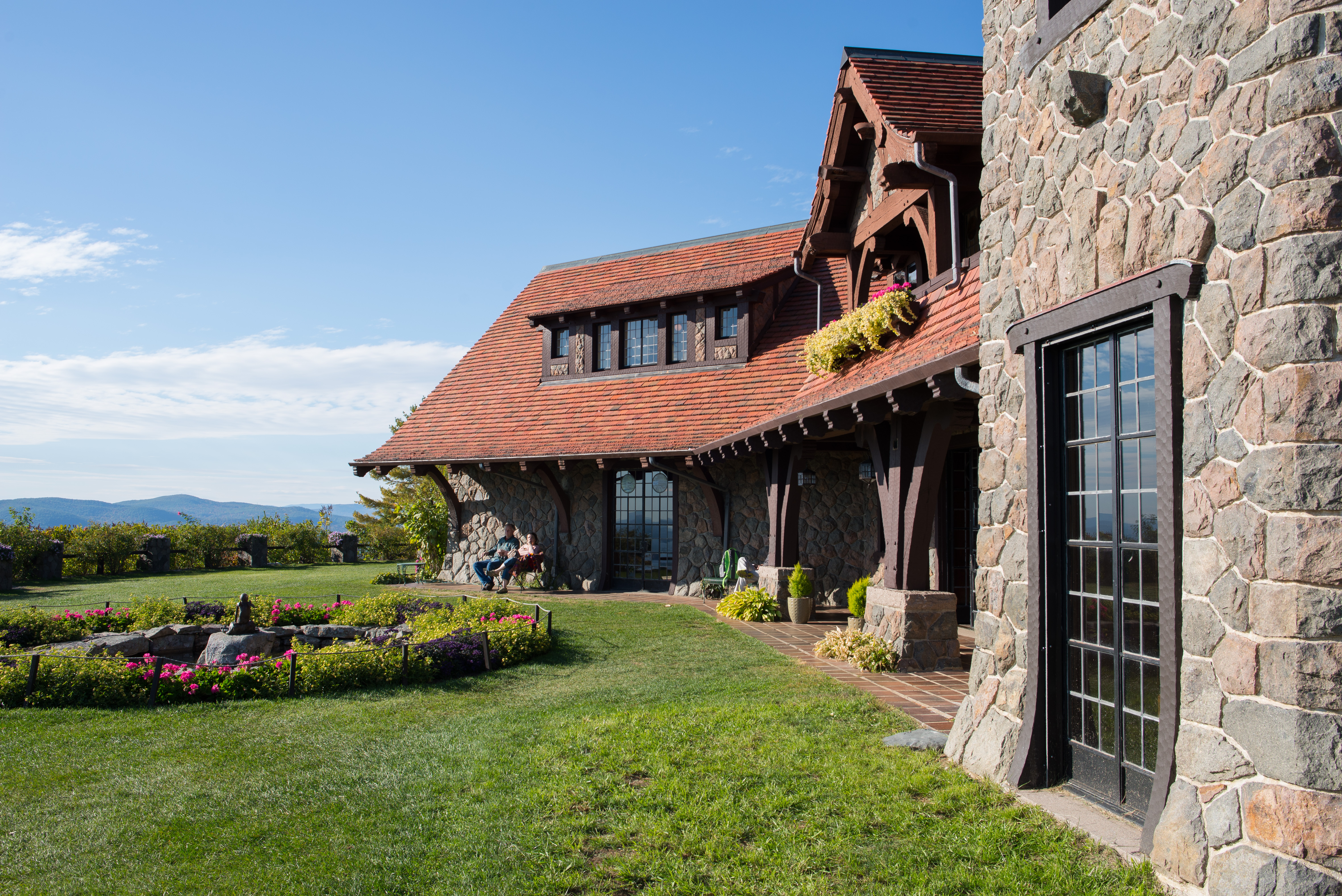
- The mansion overlooks Lake Winnipesaukee

- Location within New Hampshire Location within the United States
- Location: 455 Old Mountain Rd, Moultonborough, New Hampshire
- Coordinates: 43°43′42″N 71°19′19″W
- Area: 5,294 acres (21.42 km^{2})
- Built: 1913
- Built by: Thomas Gustave Plant
- Architect: J. Williams Beal et al.
- NRHP reference No.: 100002642 (NRHP nomination); 100011375 (NHL designation)

Significant dates
- Added to NRHP: July 5, 2018
- Designated NHL: December 13, 2024

Castle in the Clouds (or Lucknow) is a 16-room mansion and 5,294-acre (2,142 ha) mountaintop estate in Moultonborough, New Hampshire, opened seasonally to the public by the Castle Preservation Society. It overlooks Lake Winnipesaukee and the Ossipee Mountains from a rocky outcropping of Lee Mountain formerly known as "The Crow's Nest". The surrounding woodlands are protected by the Lakes Region Conservation Trust's, Castle in the Clouds Conservation Area.

== History ==
The home was built in 1913–1914 in the Craftsman style by the millionaire shoe manufacturer Thomas Gustave Plant (1859–1941) for his second wife, Olive Cornelia Dewey. He named the estate Lucknow for unknown reasons. He had no known connection to Lucknow in India. A poem by Olive reads "In the twilit hall, by the open fire / Each one agrees, 'I'm in Luck Now at last", suggesting that it was a play on words. The property was assembled from the private Ossipee Mountain Park, an observation area called the Crow's Nest, and a variety of other lodges and buildings. He razed the structures and built the mansion, a stable/garage, gatehouses, a greenhouse, farm buildings, and a golf course. The property eventually extended to 6,300 acres (25 km^{2}).

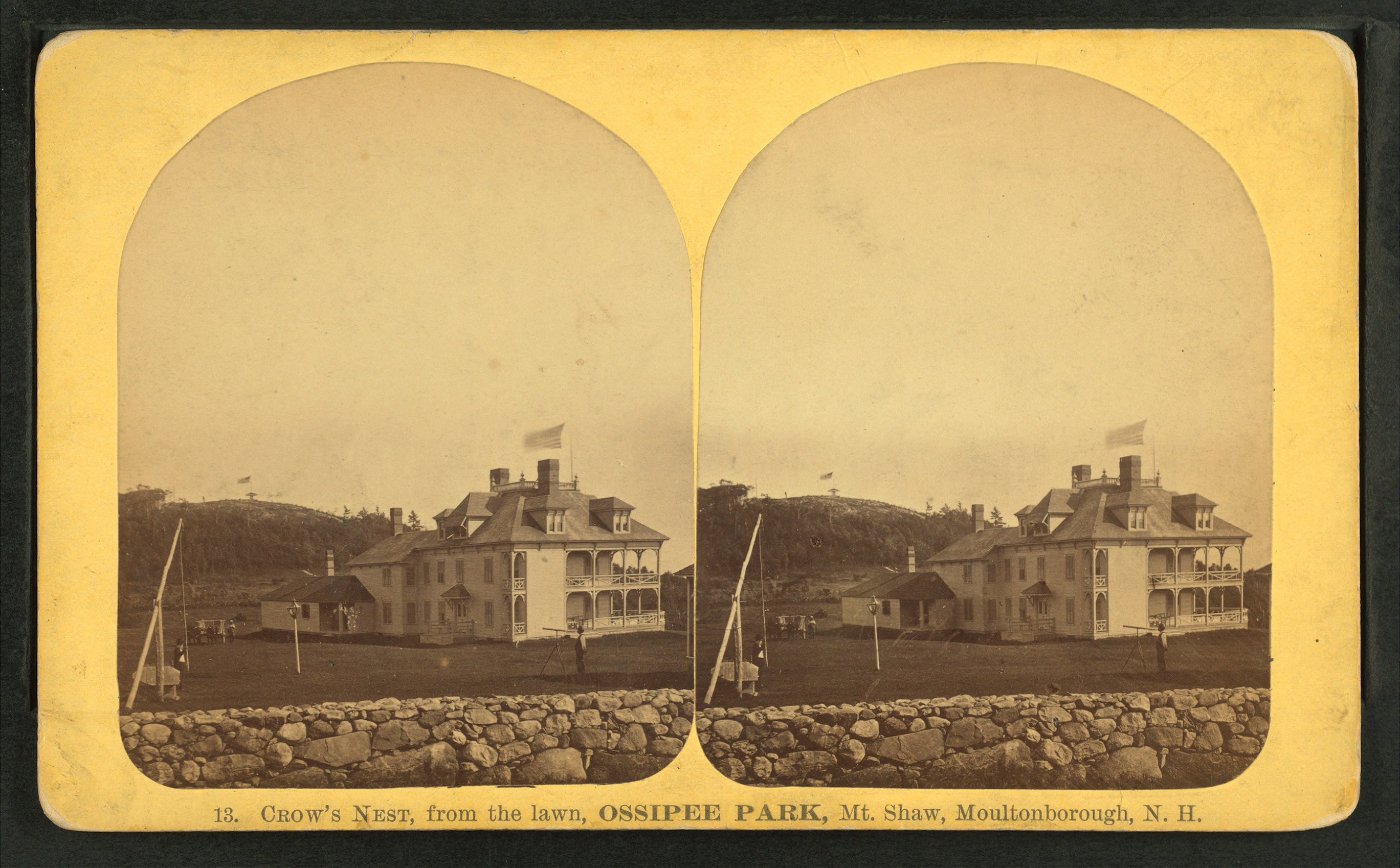
Weelahka Hall c. 1885, showing distant Crow's Nest, site of Lucknow

Designed by the prominent Boston architect J. Williams Beal (assisted by his sons John W. Beal and Horatio Beal), the house included many innovations which were rare at the time, including a circular shower, interlocking kitchen tiles, and a central vacuum system. The interiors were designed by Irving & Casson-A.H. Davenport. Bronze and tile work were by William Jackson & Company; electric fixtures by Edward F. Caldwell & Co.; and glass by Tiffany.

After Plant lost his money in a series of bad investments in the 1930s, the house was foreclosed upon, but his creditors allowed him to stay in the mansion until his death, and the furnishings remained with the house. Plant died in 1941, and the property was purchased by Fred C. Tobey to log its hardwoods and serve as a family summer home. The estate was sold to Richard and Donald Robie in 1956, who opened it as a tourist attraction.

Castle in the Clouds is today owned and operated by the Castle Preservation Society, a private 501(c)(3) non-profit corporation. The Castle, Carriage House, gift shop, art gallery and Cafe and Patio are open to the public from late May to early October. The property was listed on the National Register of Historic Places in 2018. On December 13, 2024, it was designated a National Historic Landmark.
