= Melvin Village, New Hampshire =

Census-designated place in New Hampshire, United States

- Census-designated place
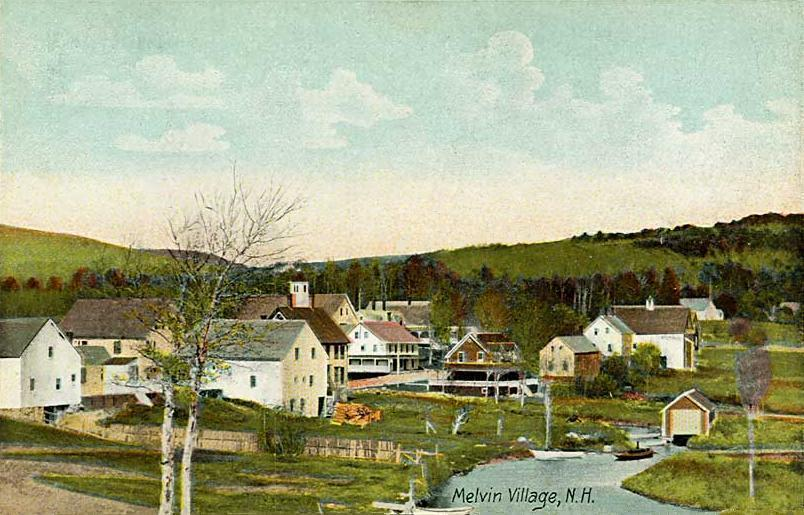
- Melvin Village in 1908

- Location within New Hampshire Location within the United States
- Coordinates: 43°41′23″N 71°18′23″W
- Country: United States
- State: New Hampshire
- County: Carroll
- Town: Tuftonboro

Area
  - Total: 2.34 sq mi (6.07 km^{2})
  - Land: 1.61 sq mi (4.16 km^{2})
  - Water: 0.74 sq mi (1.91 km^{2})
- Elevation: 525 ft (160 m)

Population (2020)
  - Total: 273
  - Density: 170.1/sq mi (65.67/km^{2})
- Time zone: UTC-5 (Eastern (EST))
  - Summer (DST): UTC-4 (EDT)
- ZIP code: 03850
- Area code: 603
- FIPS code: 33-46980
- GNIS feature ID: 2629727

Melvin Village is a census-designated place (CDP) within the town of Tuftonboro, New Hampshire, United States. Its population at the 2020 census was 273. The village is a summer vacation spot on Melvin Bay of Lake Winnipesaukee.

== Geography ==
Melvin Village is in the western part of the town of Tuftonboro, where the Melvin River enters Lake Winnipesaukee. Running through the center is New Hampshire Route 109, which leads southeast 10 miles (16 km) to Wolfeboro and northwest 7 miles (11 km) to Moultonborough.

The village is little changed over the last century. Most of the buildings remain and there are few new ones. As recently as 1950, there were two general stores and two gas stations, all of which are now gone. The village was a stop in William Least Heat-Moon's book, Blue Highways.

It has a marina and there are also compounds of cottages and lakeside homes. Merrymount Landing is the only remaining mail boat stop, in the northeastern corner of the lake.

According to the U.S. Census Bureau, the Melvin Village CDP has a total area of 2.4 square miles (6.1 km^{2}), of which 1.6 square miles (4.2 km^{2}) are land and 0.73 square miles (1.9 km^{2}), or 3.15%, are water.

== Demographics ==
Historical population
| Census | Pop. | Note | %± |
|---|---|---|---|
| 2010 | 241 | | — |
| 2020 | 273 | | 13.3% |
U.S. Decennial Census

As of the census of 2010, there were 241 people, 115 households, and 76 families residing in the CDP. There were 274 housing units, of which 159, or 58.0%, were vacant. 149 of the vacant units were for seasonal or recreational use. The racial makeup of the CDP was 99.2% white and 0.8% Asian. None of the population were Hispanic or Latino of any race.

Of the 115 households in the CDP, 20.9% had children under the age of 18 living with them, 54.8% were headed by married couples living together, 7.8% had a female householder with no husband present, and 33.9% were non-families. 26.1% of all households were made up of individuals, and 11.3% were someone living alone who was 65 years of age or older. The average household size was 2.10, and the average family size was 2.50.

15.8% of residents in the CDP were under the age of 18, 3.3% were from age 18 to 24, 14.9% were from 25 to 44, 36.5% were from 45 to 64, and 29.5% were 65 years of age or older. The median age was 56.4 years. For every 100 females, there were 95.9 males. For every 100 females age 18 and over, there were 91.5 males.

For the period 2011 to 2015, the estimated median annual income for a household was $33,417, and the median income for a family was $58,750. The per capita income for the CDP was $27,413.
