= Moultonborough, New Hampshire =

- Town
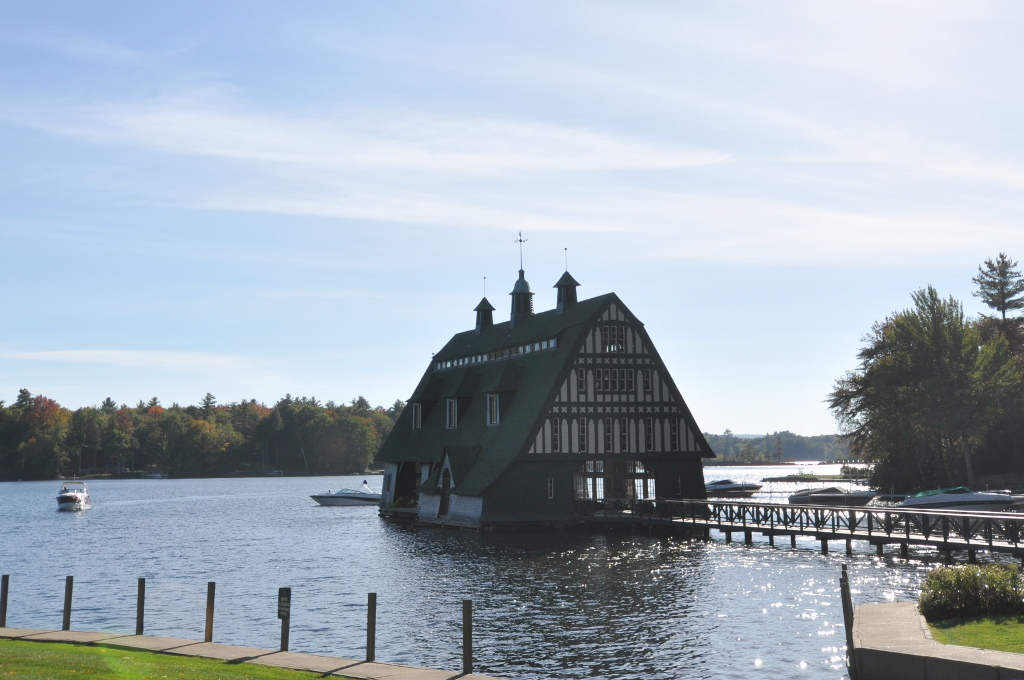
- Swallow Boathouse in Moultonborough

- Seal

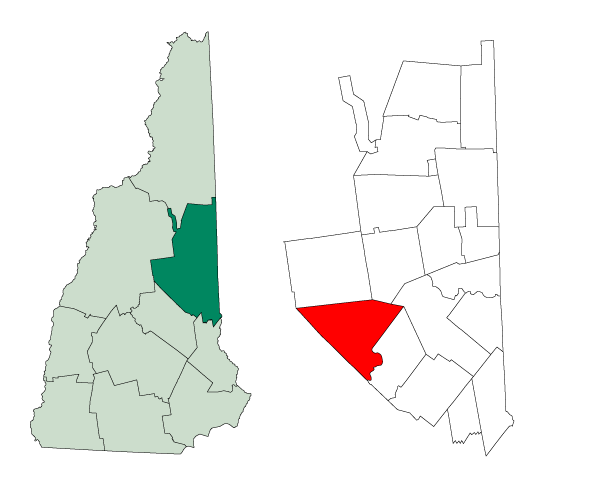
- Location in Carroll County, New Hampshire
- Coordinates: 43°45′17″N 71°23′48″W
- Country: United States
- State: New Hampshire
- County: Carroll
- Incorporated: 1777
- Villages: Moultonborough; Moultonborough Falls; Lees Mill; Suissevale

Area
  - Total: 75.1 sq mi (194.5 km^{2})
  - Land: 59.7 sq mi (154.6 km^{2})
  - Water: 15.4 sq mi (39.9 km^{2}) 20.50%
- Elevation: 502 ft (153 m)

Population (2020)
  - Total: 4,918
  - Density: 82/sq mi (31.8/km^{2})
- Time zone: UTC-5 (Eastern)
  - Summer (DST): UTC-4 (Eastern)
- ZIP code: 03254
- Area code: 603
- FIPS code: 33-49380
- GNIS feature ID: 873671
- Website: www.moultonboroughnh.gov

Moultonborough is a town in Carroll County, New Hampshire, United States. The population was 4,918 at the 2020 census, and an estimated 5,293 in 2025, up from 4,044 in 2010. Moultonborough is bounded in large part by Lake Winnipesaukee in the southwest and to a lesser extent by Squam Lake in the northwestern corner. The town includes the census-designated place of Suissevale and the community of Lees Mill.

== History ==
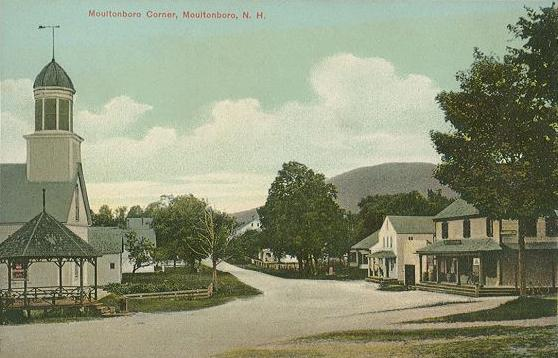
Moultonborough Corner in 1910

The first European settlers were grantees from Hampton, New Hampshire, among whom were at least sixteen Moultons, giving the town its name. The first recorded town meeting took place on March 31, 1777, at which Jonathan Moulton was elected town clerk, among other officials elected that day. The town was incorporated on November 27, 1777. Colonel Moulton (later a brigadier general) was considered to be one of the richest men in the province at the start of the American Revolution. Moultonborough was chartered in 1763 by colonial Governor Benning Wentworth, and at the time was described as being near the "Winnepisseoky Pond". It was officially incorporated in 1777.

Moultonborough is home to the "Castle in the Clouds", an estate set in the Ossipee Mountains. Thomas Gustave Plant made a fortune manufacturing shoes, bought 6,300 acres (25 km^{2}) and hired the Boston architectural firm of J. Williams Beal & Sons to design "Lucknow", a stone mansion built between 1913 and 1914. The property, with sweeping views of Lake Winnipesaukee, is a popular tourist attraction.

The town is also the location of the first known bear attack in Northern America. In August 1784, a heartbreaking incident occurred. An eight-year-old boy, son of a Mr. Leach, was attacked by a bear while tending to horses and cows in a pasture. His father, hearing his cries, rushed to the scene but was unable to save his child. The bear dragged the boy into the bushes, and the father's attempts to defend him were in vain. The family spent a distressing night, and the next morning, neighbors joined in the search, finding the child's hat and tracking his blood. Tragically, they discovered the boy's mangled corpse. As they mourned, the bear unexpectedly reappeared, prompting three individuals to shoot and kill it. A fire was then ignited to dispose of the bear's remains.

== Geography ==
According to the United States Census Bureau, the town has a total area of 75.1 square miles (194.5 km^{2}), of which 59.7 square miles (154.6 km^{2}) are land and 15.4 square miles (39.9 km^{2}) are water, comprising 20.50% of the town. A large portion of the town is located along Lake Winnipesaukee, the largest lake in New Hampshire. Moultonborough Bay, an 8-mile-long (13 km) arm of the lake, extends from the southern corner of the town towards the center of the town. Moultonborough Neck forms a peninsula between Moultonborough Bay and Center Harbor to the southwest. Long Island, the largest island in Lake Winnipesaukee, is connected to Moultonborough Neck by a bridge. The community of Suissevale, a census-designated place, occupies part of the northeastern shore of Moultonborough Bay. Inland from Winnipesaukee, Lake Kanasatka is in the western part of the town. Red Hill, elevation 2,029 feet (618 m), is in the northwest. Mount Shaw, elevation 2,990 feet (911 m), part of the Ossipee Mountains and the highest point in Moultonborough, is in the east.

The town center of Moultonborough is located 1 mile (1.6 km) north of the head of Moultonborough Bay, at the intersection of New Hampshire Route 25 and Route 109. Route 25 is a major east–west highway in the state, connecting Meredith and Plymouth to the west with Ossipee, New Hampshire, and Portland, Maine to the east. Route 109, a local road, proceeds southeast towards Wolfeboro and northwest to Center Sandwich.

=== Adjacent municipalities ===
- Sandwich (north)
- Tamworth (northeast)
- Ossipee (northeast)
- Tuftonboro (east)
- Gilford (southeast)
- Meredith (south)
- Center Harbor (west)
- Holderness (west)

== Demographics ==
Historical population
Census	Pop.	Note	%±
1790	565		—
1800	857		51.7%
1810	994		16.0%
1820	1,279		28.7%
1830	1,422		11.2%
1840	1,752		23.2%
1850	1,748		−0.2%
1860	1,448		−17.2%
1870	1,299		−10.3%
1880	1,254		−3.5%
1890	1,034		−17.5%
1900	901		−12.9%
1910	783		−13.1%
1920	758		−3.2%
1930	709		−6.5%
1940	788		11.1%
1950	880		11.7%
1960	840		−4.5%
1970	1,310		56.0%
1980	2,206		68.4%
1990	2,956		34.0%
2000	4,484		51.7%
2010	4,044		−9.8%
2020	4,918		21.6%
2024 (est.)	5,243		6.6%
U.S. Decennial Census

As of the census of 2000, there were 4,484 people, 1,884 households, and 1,377 families residing in the town. The population density was 74.9 inhabitants per square mile (28.9/km^{2}). There were 4,523 housing units at an average density of 75.6 per square mile (29.2/km^{2}).

The racial makeup of the town was:

- 98.48% White
- 0.13% African American
- 0.22% Native American
- 0.56% Asian
- 0.02% from other races
- 0.58% from two or more races
- Hispanic or Latino of any race were 0.62% of the population.

There were 1,884 households, out of which:

- 25.7% had children under the age of 18 living with them
- 63.7% were married couples living together
- 6.0% had a female householder “with no husband present”
- 26.9% were non-families
- 23.7% of all households were made up of individuals
- 9.8% had someone living alone who was 65 years of age or older.

The average household size was 2.36 and the average family size was 2.77.

Age demographics:

- 21.1% under the age of 18
- 4.1% from 18 to 24,
- 22.3% from 25 to 44
- 32.6% from 45 to 64
- 19.9% who were 65 years of age or older
- The median age was 47 years.

For every 100 females, there were 97.6 males. For every 100 females age 18 and over, there were 96.6 males.

The median income for a household in the town was $45,050, and the median income for a family was $51,729. Males had a median income of $34,236 versus $25,332 for females. The per capita income for the town was $25,733. About 3.2% of families and 4.0% of the population were below the poverty line, including 3.3% of those under age 18 and 2.6% of those age 65 or over.

== Education ==
The Moultonborough School District serves the town of Moultonborough. The district consists of Moultonborough Academy and Moultonborough Central School. Moultonborough Academy is the middle and high school, educating students in grades six through twelve. The school is located off Blake Road just south of the village of Moultonborough. The Moultonborough Central School, which is located on NH Route 25 near the academy, serves grades K–5.

== Sites of interest ==
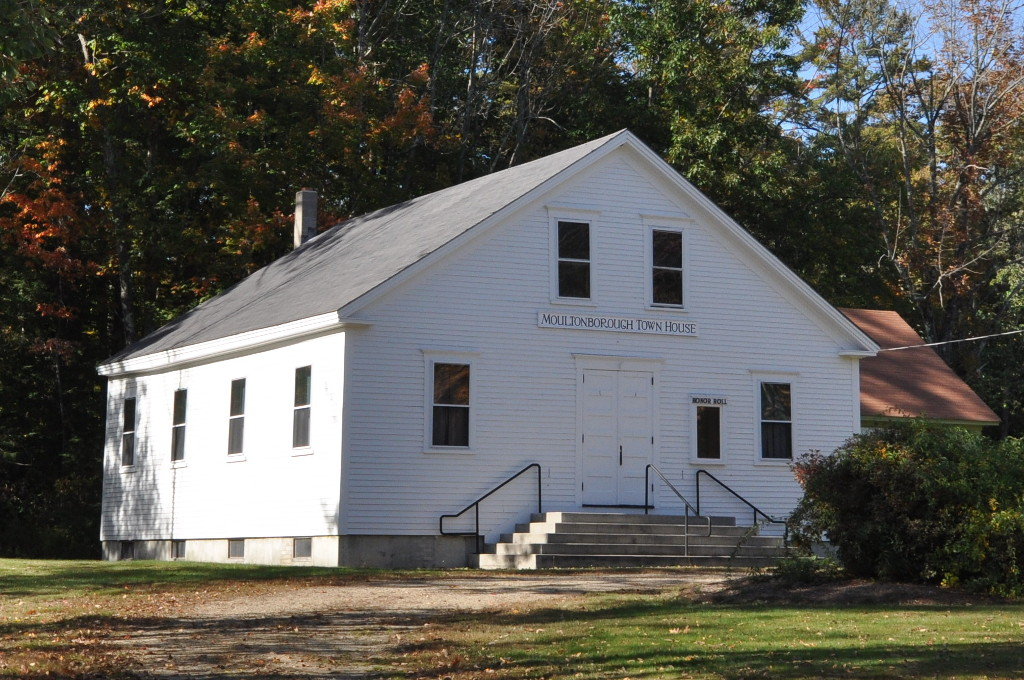
Moultonborough Town House is listed on the National Register of Historic Places.

- Castle in the Clouds
- Geneva Point Center
- Moultonborough Town House

== Notable people ==
- Frederick C. Aldrich (1924–2018), member of the New Hampshire House of Representatives
- Benning M. Bean (1782–1866), US congressman
- Jonathan Moulton (1726–1787), Revolutionary War era colonel
- Thomas Gustave Plant (1859–1941), industrialist
- Claude Rains (1889–1967), actor; buried at Red Hill Cemetery
- John M. True (1838–1921), Wisconsin politician
- John Greenleaf Whittier (1807–1892), poet (summer resident)
