= Ossipee Mountains =

Mountain in the American state of New Hampshire

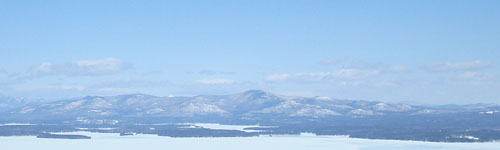
- The Ossipee Mountains, as seen from the south across Lake Winnipesaukee from the Belknap Mountains

Highest point
- Peak: Mount Shaw
- Elevation: 2,990 ft (910 m)
- Listing: List of mountains in New Hampshire
- Coordinates: 43°46′24″N 71°16′06″W

Geography
- Location within New Hampshire
- Location: Carroll County

Geology
- Rock age: ~125 million years (Cretaceous)
- Mountain type: Ring dike

The Ossipee Mountains are a small mountain range in the New England state of New Hampshire, United States. The remains of an ancient volcanic ring dike, they lie north of Lake Winnipesaukee, east of Squam Lake, and south of the Sandwich Range, the southernmost of the White Mountains. At 2,990 ft (910 m), Mount Shaw is their highest point.

== Geology and physiography ==
The Ossipee Mountains are the remains of a 125 million year-old volcanic ring dike, the remnant of a Cretaceous stratovolcano of the later White Mountain igneous province. The complex is circular in plane view and has a diameter of 14 km. The ring-dike complex is easily identified on satellite images, with its southeast edge located about 5 miles (8 km) northwest of the town center of Ossipee.

== Notable summits ==
- Bald Knob
- Bayle Mountain
- Big Ball Mountain
- Faraway Mountain
- Mount Flagg
- Larcom Mountain
- Nickerson Mountain
- Mount Roberts
- Sentinel Mountain
- Mount Shaw
- Turtleback Mountain
- Mount Whittier

== See also ==
- Castle in the Clouds - a large estate located on the western portion of the Ossipee Mountains.
- Pawtuckaway State Park - a related ring dike in southern New Hampshire
