= Gunstock =

Gunstock may refer to:

== Objects ==
- Stock (firearms), a component of a long gun
- Gunstock war club, a Native American weapon

== Place names in the United States ==
- Gunstock Knob, a mountain in West Virginia
- Gunstock Mountain, a mountain in New Hampshire
  - Gunstock Mountain Resort, a ski area in New Hampshire
- Gunstock River, a river in New Hampshire
