= Belknap Mountain =

Mountain in the American state of New Hampshire

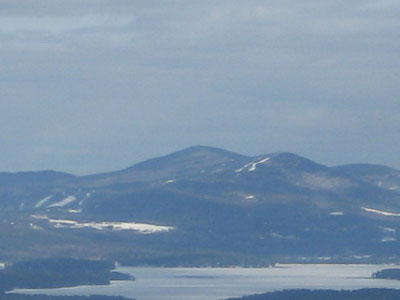
- Belknap Mountain (left) as seen from Red Hill

Highest point
- Elevation: 2,382 ft (726 m)
- Prominence: 1,842 ft (561 m)
- Listing: #47 New England Fifty Finest
- Coordinates: 43°31′04″N 71°22′09″W

Geography
- Location: Gilford, in Belknap County, New Hampshire
- Parent range: Belknap Mountains
- Topo map: USGS West Alton

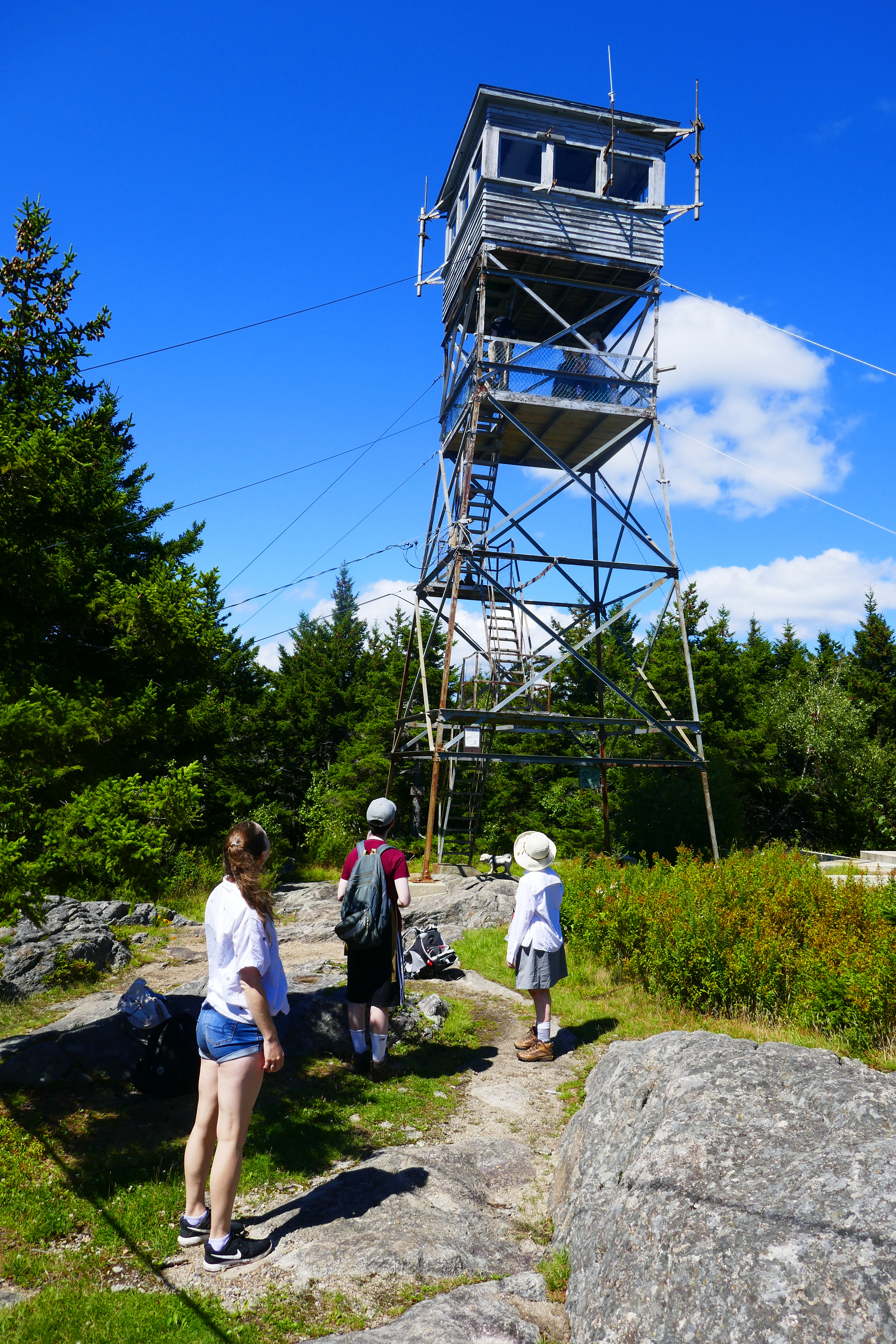
Fire tower at summit

Belknap Mountain is a mountain located in Belknap County, New Hampshire, United States, south of Lake Winnipesaukee. Like the county, the mountain and the associated surrounding Belknap Mountains are named after Jeremy Belknap (1744–1798), a renowned preacher, historian, and author of The History of New Hampshire. The mountain is within Belknap Mountain State Forest.

The peak of Belknap Mountain is the highest point in the county. Although of only modest elevation, the isolation of the Belknap Mountains gives Belknap Mountain 1,850 ft (560 m) of relative height above the low ground separating it from the White Mountains, making it one of the fifty most topographically prominent peaks in New England. Belknap Mountain is flanked to the northwest by Gunstock Mountain, the site of the Gunstock Mountain Resort ski area. The summit of Belknap Mountain features an active fire tower.

Belknap Mountain stands within the watershed of the Merrimack River, which drains into the Gulf of Maine in Massachusetts. The east and northeast sides of Belknap Mountain drain into Poorfarm Brook, thence into Lake Winnipesaukee, the Winnipesaukee River, and the Merrimack. The west side drains into Gunstock River, thence into Lake Winnipesaukee. The south side drains into Manning Lake, thence into Crystal Lake, the source of the Suncook River, and thence into the Merrimack River.

== Geology ==
Belknap Mountain, and the mountains with which it is closely associated in the Belknap Mountain range, are part of the White Mountain Magma Series, as described by Long. This series of mountains of igneous origin represents volcanic activity that occurred during the Jurassic period, about 200-150 mya. The White Mountain Magma series is thought to have formed above an aborted transform fault in the crust. Volcanic activity facilitated by this fault more than 160 mya resulted in a flood of moat volcanics that covered much of New Hampshire. The Belknap Mountains as observed today are the remnants of erosion of those volcanics and the metamorphic rocks underneath them, together representing about 4 miles (6 km) in depth. As described in detail by Long, contemporary features of the Belknap Mountains include the former magma chamber, and inner and outer ring dike formations that surround collapsed blocks of Devonian rocks and moat volcanics. Mineral and rock assemblages of the Belknap Mountains reveal a complex geological history, as recorded in the greatest variety of igneous rock in the White Mountains region.

== See also ==
- List of mountains of New Hampshire
- List of New England Fifty Finest
