= Belknap Mountains =

Mountain range in the American state of New Hampshire

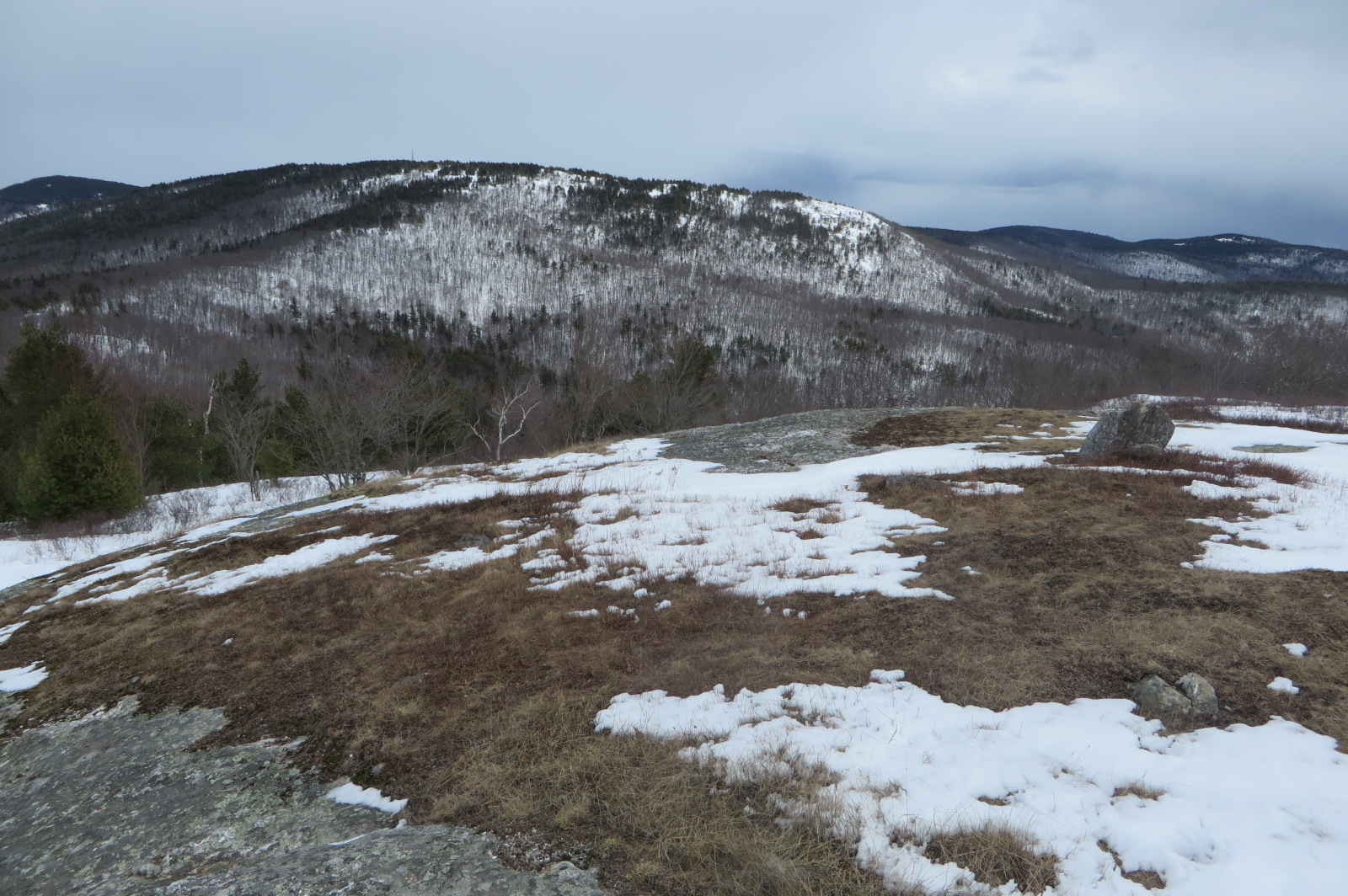
- View of the south side of the Belknap Range from Whiteface Mountain: Gunstock Mountain on far left; Piper Mountain in center; Suncook Mountain and Mt. Klem to the right

Highest point
- Elevation: 2,382 ft (726 m)
- Coordinates: 43°31′04″N 71°22′09″W

Geography
- Location: Belknap County, New Hampshire, US

The Belknap Mountains are a small mountain range in the Lakes Region of New Hampshire in the United States. The range lies in the towns of Gilford, Gilmanton, and Alton in Belknap County. The highest peak, Belknap Mountain, with an elevation of 2,382 feet (726 m) above sea level, is the highest point in Belknap County. Belknap Mountain State Forest covers the central part of the range, including the summit and slopes of Belknap Mountain.

The range extends for approximately 8 miles (13 km) in an arc that begins at New Hampshire Route 11A in Gilford and runs south, then curves east through the northern end of Gilmanton, before ending in the town of Alton, where it overlooks Alton Bay of Lake Winnipesaukee.

The named summits in the range, from northwest to southeast, are Mount Rowe (1,690 ft or 520 m), Gunstock Mountain (2,240 ft or 680 m), Belknap Mountain, Straightback Mountain (1,890 ft or 580 m), and Mount Major (1,786 ft or 544 m). A cluster of several unofficially named summits with elevations ranging from 1,806 to 2,001 feet (550 to 610 m) are on the main crest of the range between Belknap Mountain and Straightback Mountain, surrounding Round Pond, itself located near the crest of the range at 1,652 feet (504 m) above sea level. A secondary ridge extends southwest from Belknap Mountain to the Gilford/Gilmanton line, containing, from north to south, the summits of Piper Mountain (2,044 ft or 623 m) and Whiteface Mountain (1,670 ft or 510 m).

The range is entirely in the Merrimack River watershed. The northeast side of the range drains via several small brooks to Lake Winnipesaukee, the outlet of which is the Winnipesaukee River, which drains westward to form the Merrimack. The west side of the range drains via the Gunstock River into Lake Winnipesaukee, and the extreme southwest end of the range, near Whiteface Mountain, drains west via the Tioga River to the Winnipesaukee River. The south side of the range, including Round Pond, drains south via the Suncook River to the Merrimack.

Mount Rowe and Gunstock Mountain form the slopes of Gunstock Mountain Resort, a major ski area for central New Hampshire.
