= Mount Rowe =

Mountain in New Hampshire, United States

Mt. Rowe
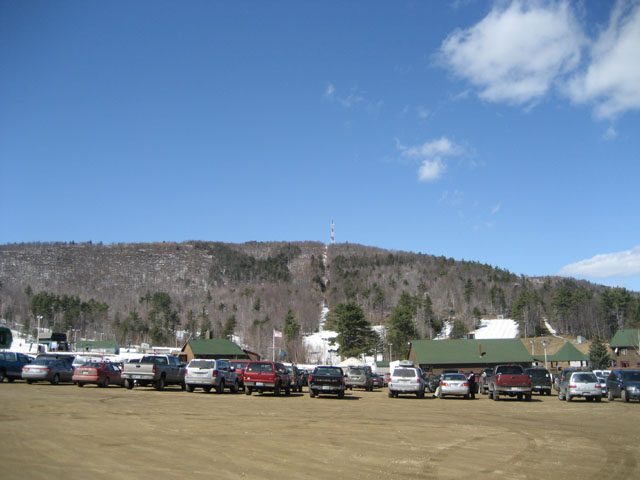
- Mount Rowe as seen from the Gunstock Mountain Resort parking lot

Highest point
- Elevation: 1,680 ft (510 m)
- Coordinates: 43°32′43″N 71°22′41″W

Geography
- Location: Town of Gilford, Belknap County, New Hampshire
- Parent range: Belknap Mountains
- Topo map(s): USGS Laconia, NH

Mount Rowe, elevation 1,680 feet (510 m), is a mountain located north of Gunstock Mountain in the Belknap Range, Belknap County, New Hampshire, United States. It has been home to multiple alpine ski operations, including the original Gunstock Mountain Resort single chairlift (now removed), the Belknap Ski Jumps, and the defunct Alpine Ridge/Mt. Rowe ski area.
