= Rattlesnake Island (New Hampshire) =

Island in New Hampshire, United States

Coordinates: 43°33′58″N 71°17′15″W

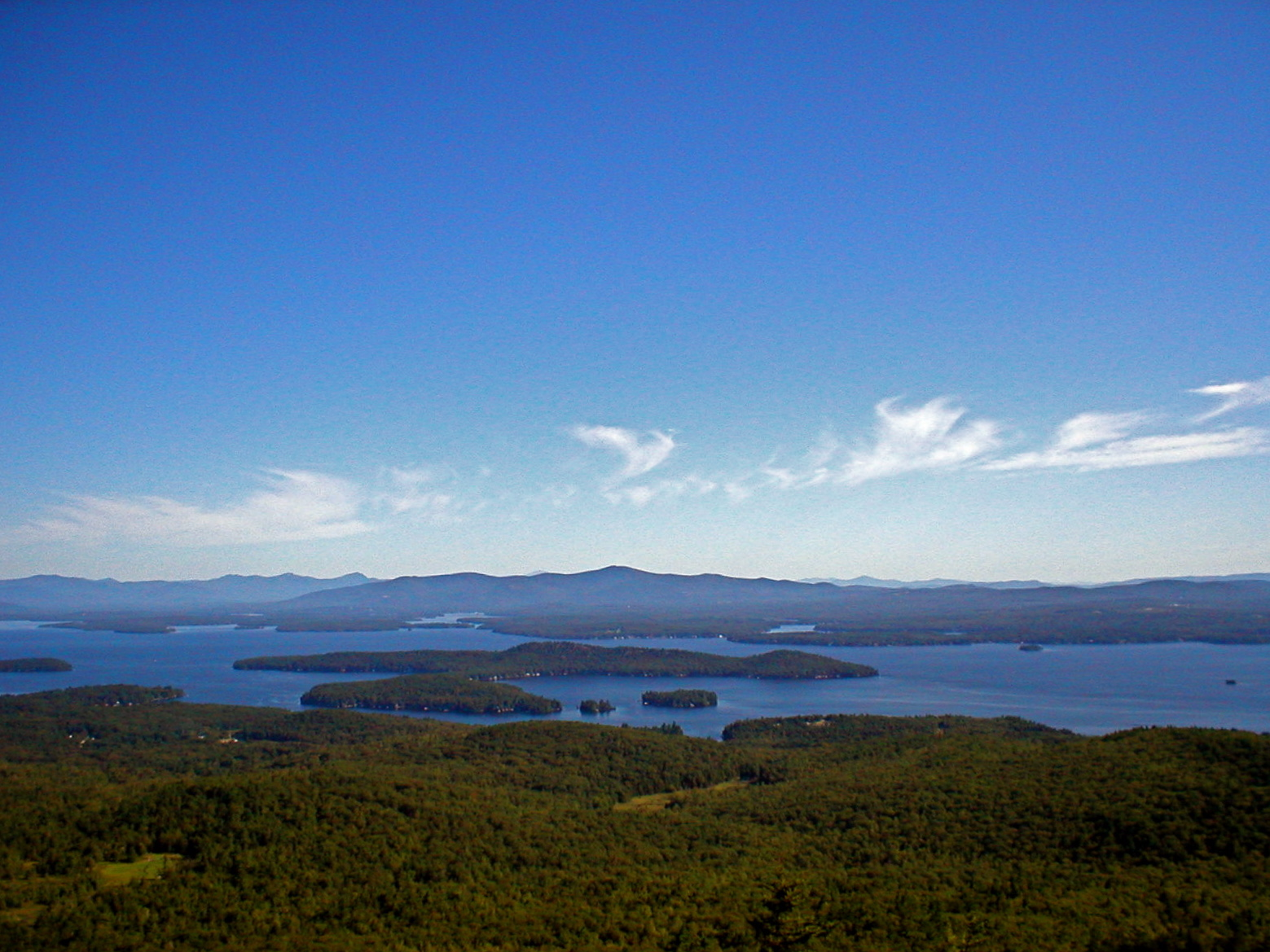
A view of Rattlesnake Island from Mount Major

Rattlesnake Island is a large island in Lake Winnipesaukee, New Hampshire. There are conflicting accounts of where it got its name, because its shape looks somewhat like a snake, but some say it is named for a rattlesnake population that lived there.

The island is located within the town of Alton.

== Topography and physical features ==
Rattlesnake Island is about 2 miles (3 km) long, and approximately 5 miles (8 km) around its shore. The topography varies greatly. Some sections of the island are quite steep, with the land rising steeply from the shore (affording views of the area), while other sections, particularly on the "peninsula", which protrudes from the southerly side of the island, rise gradually. Rattlesnake Island is the highest (in elevation) island on Lake Winnipesaukee. The top of so-called "Mount Rattlesnake" (the top of Rattlesnake Island is not officially named) is 874 feet (266 m) high - rising 370 feet (110 m) above the mean lake level.

Due to its great height, the island affords extensive views of the lake. There are hiking trails interconnecting with other parts of the island, and these are used frequently by island residents.

== Rattlesnake Island Association ==
Island property owners are required to join the Rattlesnake Island Association, including payment of yearly association dues. In addition to owning land on the island itself, the Rattlesnake Island Association owns a mainland area to the east of Smith Point in Glidden Cove which includes short-term docking, a boat launching ramp, and two large parking areas for residents and guests. There is also an area for the parking of boat trailers.

Electric power and wired telephone service is available to all parts of the island. As of 2016, DSL service from Fairpoint Communications is available to most parts of the island, but other services such as cable or fiber optic services are not available.

== Conservation land ==
At one time, interior lots were to be sold for development. However, this did not occur, and the interior of the island is now set aside as a conservation area. The easterly half (more or less) of the island's interior is owned by the Lakes Region Conservation Trust, while the westerly portion of the interior is owned by the Rattlesnake Island Association. The Lakes Region Conservation Trust maintains a dock at the far southeastern end of the island, and Conservation Trust members are permitted to dock there and access the hiking trails.
