= Kimball Castle =

Historic house in New Hampshire, United States

- U.S. National Register of Historic Places
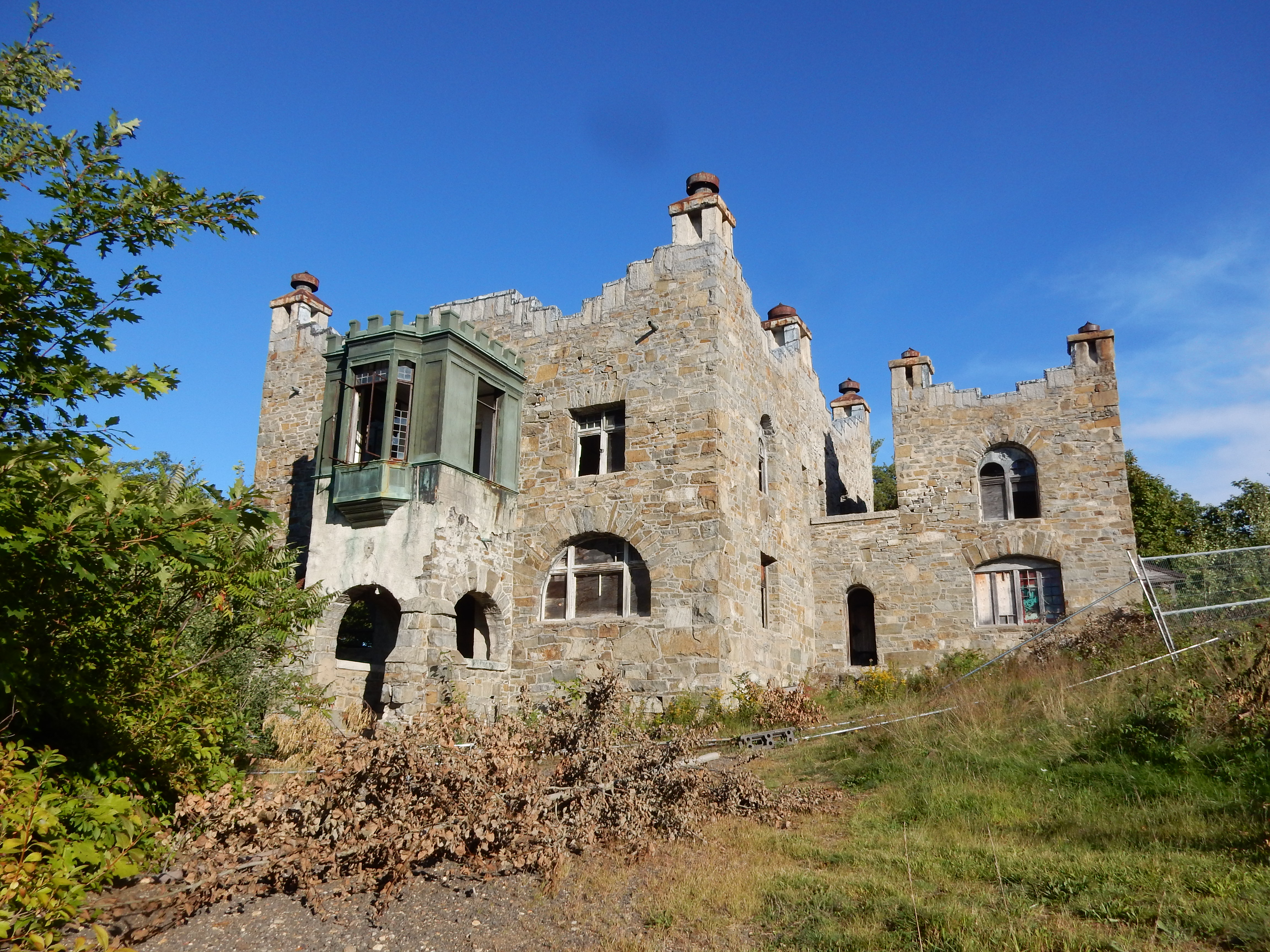
- The castle in 2018

- Location within New Hampshire Location within the United States
- Location: Locke's Hill Rd., Gilford, New Hampshire
- Coordinates: 43°35′1″N 71°22′46″W
- Area: 13 acres (5.3 ha)
- Built: 1894
- Architectural style: Shingle Style, Medieval Castle
- NRHP reference No.: 82001666
- Added to NRHP: August 16, 1982

Kimball Castle is the former summer estate of railroad magnate Benjamin Ames Kimball. It is located on a hill overlooking Lake Winnipesaukee in the town of Gilford, New Hampshire, United States. Although portions of the Kimball's original 300-acre (120 ha) estate have been subdivided, much of it remains conservation land managed by the town. The 20.1-acre (8.1 ha) subdivided portion on which the 2 1/2-story medieval-style castle stands is privately owned and no longer part of the Charlotte Kimball trust.

Kimball Castle sustained significant damage due to a fire on August 27, 2025, and as a result, has been determined to be a total loss, with demolition likely necessary.

== History ==
Benjamin Kimball, a director of railroad companies operating in the region, built the castle and estate outbuildings beginning in 1894, and used it as his summer estate until his death in 1920, in his home in Concord, New Hampshire. The castle was built by Italian stonemasons using local granite and materials imported from Europe; its construction cost was about $50,000.

In 1960, Charlotte Kimball, Benjamin Kimball's daughter-in-law and last remaining heir, died and in her will donated the land to the Mary Mitchell Humane Foundation (an adjunct to the MSPCA-Angell), to manage the property as a wildlife preserve and sanctuary. Over the next several years, the funds left to carry out the wishes of Charlotte Kimball went missing, and the Mary Mitchell Humane Foundation attempted to sell the entire estate. During this period, the property fell into disrepair and the buildings became subject to extensive vandalism. A group of concerned citizens, led by Sandra McGonagle, petitioned the New Hampshire Attorney General's office of Charitable Trusts, and an investigation into the missing funds ensued. As settlement of the lawsuit, the Attorney General and the Belknap County Superior Court ordered that the town take over as trustees of Charlotte's estate and carry out the tenets of her will.

The town of Gilford took over as trustees in 1981 under the directives of the court and performed a study as to how best carry out Charlotte's wishes. The master plan recommended that the land be subdivided and a portion of the land, including the castle, be sold to a private party for commercial development with the intent that proceeds of the sales be used to replenish the missing funds and carry out Charlotte's wishes of managing the remaining land still held in trust. In 1990 the town and attorney general successfully had the noncommercial stipulation vacated allowing for the sale of the subdivided portion. The town established the Kimball Conservation Committee to oversee the use of those funds, and created a conservation area with hiking trails on the remaining 280 acres (110 ha) of conservation land. Proposals have been made, but not acted on, to develop the castle into a resort hotel.

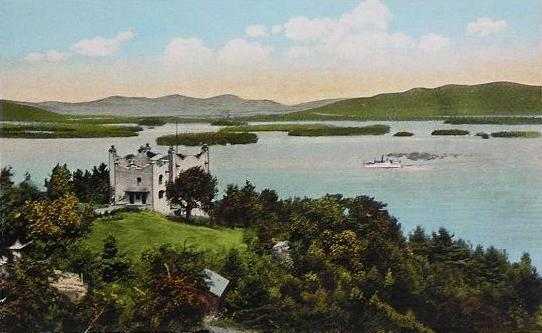
Early 20th century postcard

The castle and its associated outbuildings were listed on the National Register of Historic Places in 1982. The Lockes Hill Hiking trails are accessed via a parking lot and trailhead on Route 11. The 20.1 acres on which all the buildings stand are now private property, posted with No Trespassing signs and are not open to the public. The castle was condemned by the town of Gilford as unsafe.

In the early morning of August 27, 2025, the Castle was severely damaged by fire. The building was considered a complete loss. The floors, ceilings and roof collapsed, and what was left of the structure was unsafe.

== See also ==
- National Register of Historic Places listings in Belknap County, New Hampshire
