= Lake Winnipesaukee Sailing Association =

Lake Winnipesaukee Sailing Association (LWSA) is a non-profit educational institution focused on sailing education that was founded in 1988 in Gilford, New Hampshire on Lake Winnipesaukee in the Lakes Region. Since 1988, LWSA has educated over 2,500 young sailors.

== History ==
Lake Winnipesaukee Sailing Association was founded in 1988 as the Lake Winnipesaukee Yacht Racing Association, and its main focus is on youth sailing education. The Sailing School is located on Smith Cove in Gilford, with classrooms in the Dave Adams Memorial Sailing Center, named after a local sailor who started out sailing at LWSA, but died as a young adult.

== Sailing ==
LWSA conducts a youth sailing school in Gilford. The school teaches sailing to youth and adults, as well as local charities working with veterans and physically- or developmentally-challenged youth. In learning sailing, students also learn safety, self-confidence, teamwork, honesty, positive sporting values, and an appreciation for the environment. The sailing school also cooperates with the Parks and Recreation Departments of several towns (Gilford, Laconia, Belmont, and Meredith) in New Hampshire's Lakes Region to provide community access to sailing lessons.

LWSA organizes large-scale sailboat racing on Lake Winnipesaukee, including a one-design J/80 racing fleet and a PHRF fleet. Among J/80 fleets worldwide, the LWSA fleet is designated as J/80 Fleet One within the J/80 North American Class Association. LWSA has hosted the annual J-Jamboree regatta for over twenty years and hosted the 2016-18 Grand Masters regattas. LWSA is the organizing body for the main youth regatta in the Lakes Region, the W.A.R. (Winnipesaukee Annual Regatta), held over many years on the site of the Winnipesaukee Yacht Club. J/80 sailors from LWSA sail in regattas mainly on the east coast of the United States (particularly northeast). 420 sailors from LWSA sail in regattas in New England in lakes and the Atlantic Ocean. LWSA is a member of the US Sailing Association, and it is within the Western Region of the Northeast Sailing Association.
