= Glendale, New Hampshire =

Unincorporated community in New Hampshire, United States

- Unincorporated community
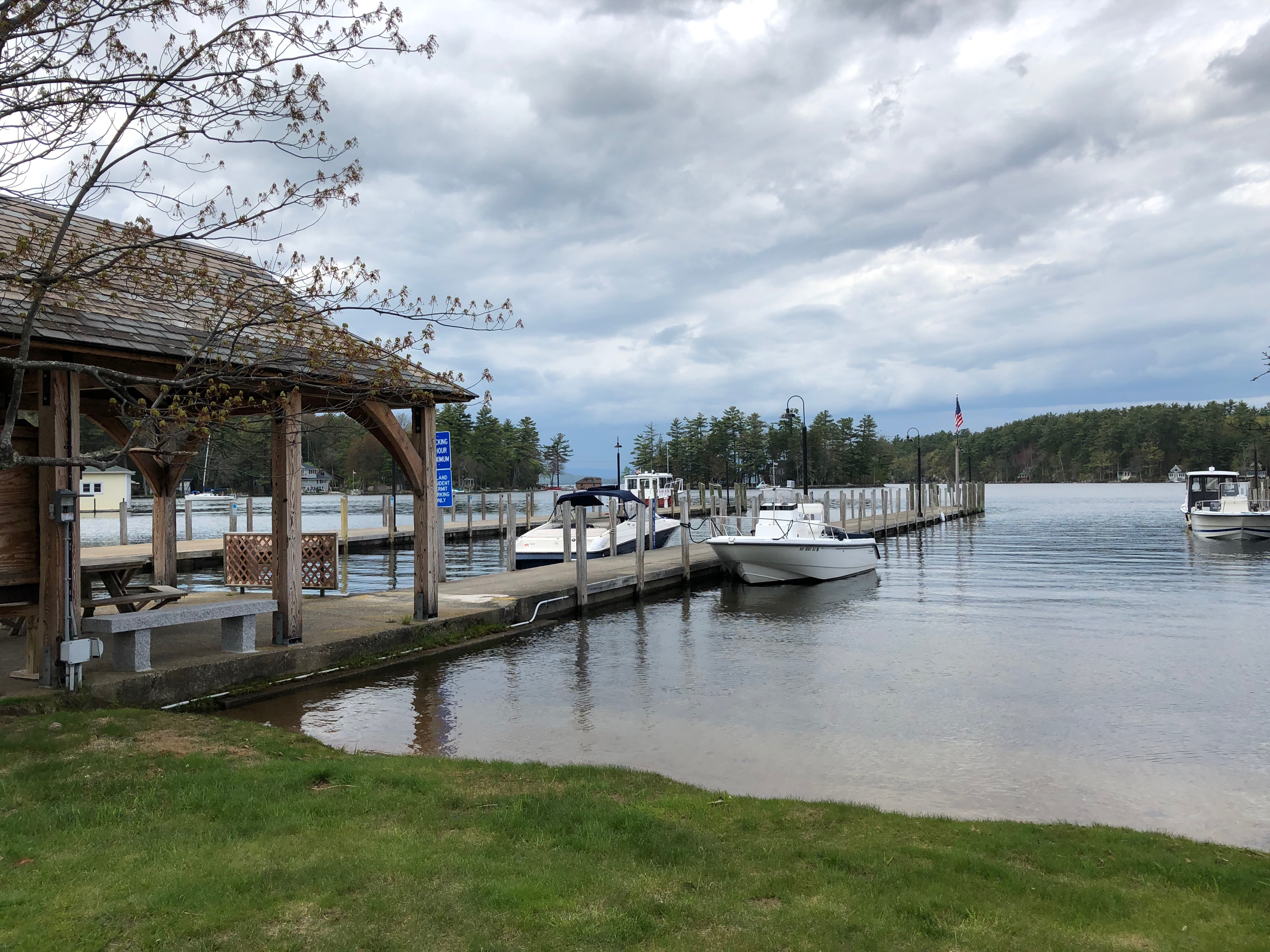
- The Glendale docks for island residents on Lake Winnipesaukee

- Location in New Hampshire and the United States Glendale (the United States)
- Coordinates: 43°34′57″N 71°23′13″W
- Country: United States
- State: New Hampshire
- County: Belknap
- Town: Gilford
- Elevation: 548 ft (167 m)
- Time zone: UTC-5 (Eastern (EST))
  - Summer (DST): UTC-4 (EDT)
- Area code: 603
- GNIS feature ID: 871182

Glendale is an unincorporated community in the town of Gilford in Belknap County, New Hampshire, United States. Glendale is located on the southern shore of Lake Winnipesaukee, east of Laconia. Glendale is served by New Hampshire Route 11 and is near Laconia Municipal Airport.
