= Belknap Mountain State Forest =

State forest in Belknap County, New Hampshire

Coordinates: 43°31′3″N 71°22′9″W

- Location: Belknap County, New Hampshire
- Nearest city: Laconia, New Hampshire
- Area: 1,300 acres (5.3 km^{2})
- Governing body: New Hampshire Department of Natural and Cultural Resources

Belknap Mountain State Forest is a 1,300-acre (530 ha) state forest in central New Hampshire within the Belknap Mountains. The forest contains the summit and surrounding slopes of 2,382-foot (726 m) Belknap Mountain, the highest point in Belknap County, as well as lands to the east extending to Round Pond. The forest is bordered to the north by Gunstock Mountain and Gunstock Mountain Resort, a downhill ski area. A lookout tower is at the top of Belknap Mountain, and there is an extensive trail network in the forest.

Belknap Mountain State Forest is owned by the New Hampshire Department of Natural and Cultural Resources, and there is a conservation easement on private land to the north of the state forest. It adjoins several other county, town, and private conservation and recreation areas.

== See also ==
- List of New Hampshire state forests
