= Governors Island (Lake Winnipesaukee) =

Island in New Hampshire, United States

- Interactive map of Governors Island

Geography
- Location: Lake Winnipesaukee; Gilford, New Hampshire
- Coordinates: 43°36′35″N 71°25′31″W
- Length: 1.8 mi (2.9 km)
- Width: 0.7 mi (1.1 km)
- Highest elevation: 646 ft (196.9 m)

Administration
- United States
- State: New Hampshire
- County: Belknap
- Town: Gilford

Demographics
- Population: varies seasonally

Governors Island is one of six bridged islands on Lake Winnipesaukee and is part of the town of Gilford, New Hampshire, in the United States. The island is primarily wooded and residential and has an area of 504 acres (204 ha). The island is an enclave of luxury homes, including some of the most expensive on the lake.

== History ==
The island was originally granted to British colonial governor John Wentworth in 1772, although the island had already been known as Governor's Island, possibly after his uncle, Benning Wentworth, the previous governor of the colony. In 1778 during the American Revolution, the New Hampshire legislature confiscated the lands of hitherto Governor Wentworth (who had fled to Nova Scotia) and ordered that the lands, including Governor's Island, be auctioned off, which they were in 1780 to John Cushing of Boston for 9,600 Continental pounds. Cushing in turn sold the island to John Langdon of Portsmouth in 1788. Langdon went on to become a United States senator for New Hampshire and governor of New Hampshire in his own right.

Langdon sold the island in 1797 to Lemuel Mason, a former Revolutionary War soldier from Alton, New Hampshire. The island was bought by Eleazer Davis in 1799, and the island remained in the Davis family until 1857 under the stewardship of his son Nathaniel Davis. Nathaniel adhered to the Millerite faith and held revival camps on the island with William Miller himself officiating. Nathaniel's sons Franklin and Eleazer sold the island in 1857 to George Smith of Meredith and David Plummer of Concord, New Hampshire.

In 1872, the island was sold to Isaac Merrill and Henry Brown of Gilford, who in turn sold it to its most famous modern owner in 1880. The buyer was Stilson Hutchins of Washington, DC, founding owner and editor of The Washington Post. Hutchins had a grand mansion built out of granite there in 1885, which he used as his summer home. The architect was Alfred B. Mullett, the supervising architect of the U.S. Treasury, and the construction manager was Job W. Angus, who had built the Smithsonian Institution in Washington, DC. Hutchins had U.S. presidents as summer guests, including Grover Cleveland and Theodore Roosevelt. From 1903 to 1908, Hutchins leased the island to the German ambassador to the United States, Count von Sternburg, and during summers the island served as the location of the German Embassy to the United States with a staff of twenty.

The Hutchins family sold the island in 1928 to real estate developer Clifford Hayes, who went bankrupt in 1935 during the Great Depression, resulting in the few residents forming an association, the current Governor's Island Club, to take over the island.

The island has become the site of some of the largest and most expensive homes on the lake, with the 167 properties on the island representing 15% of the town of Gilford's tax base. In 2018 and 2019, sales on the island valued most of the homes in the multi-million-dollar range. About 140 acres (57 ha) of the island has been preserved from development, and features hiking trails.

== See also ==
Another Governor's Island occupies Island Pond in Hampstead, New Hampshire.
