= Glenn Cooper =

American author & physician (born 1953)

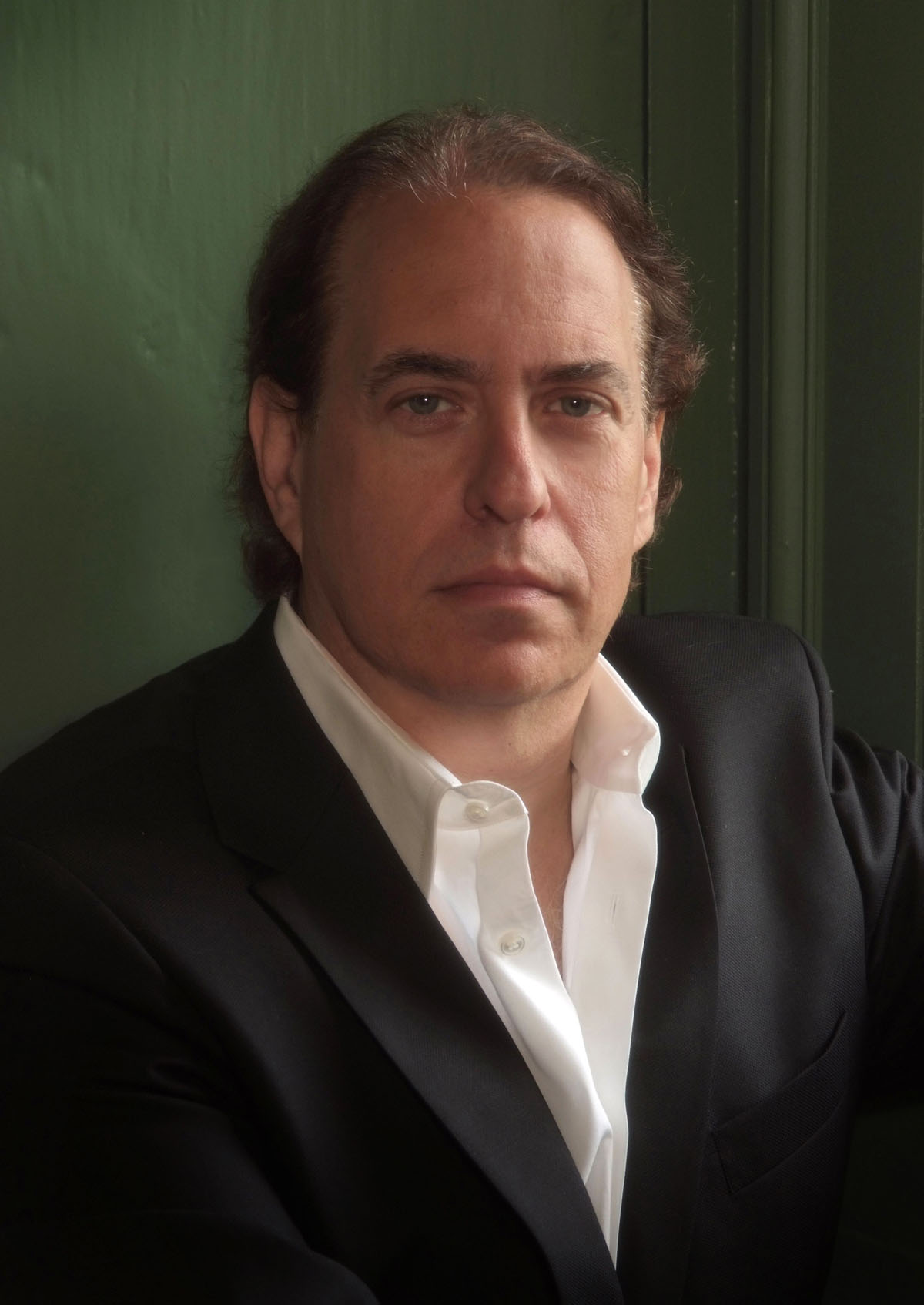
- Born: January 8, 1953 (age 73)
- Education: Harvard University, Tufts University School of Medicine
- Occupation: Novelist
- Spouse: Tessa W. Cooper
- Writing career
- Period: 2009-present
- Genres: Thriller, adventure, mystery, conspiracy, historical thriller
- Notable works: The Library of the Dead, The Book of Souls, The Keepers of the Library, The Tenth Chamber, The Devil Will Come
- Website: www.glenncooperbooks.com

Glenn Cooper (born January 8, 1953) is an American author and physician best known for being an internationally best selling thriller writer. His books have been translated into 31 languages and, as of 2014, have sold over six million copies. He lives in Gilford, New Hampshire and he is an honorary citizen of Solofra.

The Library of the Dead trilogy is currently being adapted into a television series by Pioneer Pictures.

== Early life and education ==
Cooper grew up in suburban New York. After graduating from White Plains High School, he attended Harvard University, where he graduated magna cum laude in 1974 with a Bachelor of Arts in Archaeology. Next, he attended Tufts University School of Medicine, where he earned his medical degree in 1978. He completed an internship and residency in internal medicine at the Beth Israel Deaconess Medical Center and a fellowship in infectious diseases at the Massachusetts General Hospital in Boston. He served as an emergency physician at the Khao-I-Dang Refugee Camp in Thailand, a position sponsored by the International Rescue Committee, and at the Hôpital Albert Schweitzer in Haiti. He also worked for the U.S. Public Health Service, based in Lowell, Massachusetts, for two years.

== Corporate career ==
In 1985, Cooper joined Eli Lilly and Company where he conducted research on new antibiotics. He held several research, clinical and regulatory positions at Lilly in the United States and England before joining the biotechnology company, Sphinx Pharmaceuticals, Inc. in Durham, North Carolina in 1990 as executive vice president and chief operating officer. In 1992, he joined Progenitor, Inc. as president and chief executive officer. Then, in 1993, he joined Interneuron Pharmaceuticals in Lexington, Massachusetts, Progenitor’s parent company, as chairman and chief executive officer. Interneuron changed its name to Indevus Pharmaceuticals and Cooper remained as CEO until the company was purchased in 2009 by Endo Pharmaceuticals. While at Indevus, Cooper oversaw the FDA approval and commercial introduction of several drugs for urological and endocrinological conditions. He has served on the boards of directors of multiple public and privately held biotechnology companies.

== Writing career ==
Cooper began writing over 20 years ago. He is quoted as saying that he always found that writing gave him a balance by mixing the rigors of his scientific life with his creative side. Initially, he concentrated on screenplays. Although a handful of his approximately 20 scripts have been optioned for development, none have made it into production.

Cooper wrote his first novel, The Library of the Dead, based on the discovery of a vast, mysterious underground library of medieval texts. He approached 66 literary agents with the manuscript and 65 rejected it before Steve Kasdin at Sandra Dijkstra Literary Agency agreed to represent him. Kasdin, now at the literary agency Curtis Brown, Ltd., subsequently sold the novel to publishers throughout the world. That book and Cooper’s next six novels went on to become international bestsellers. The Italian literary critic Antonio D’Orrico praised The Library of the Dead in the newspaper Corriere della Sera, writing, "Glenn Cooper has written one of the best-designed novels that I've read in 14 years.”

Cooper added two more books to The Library of the Dead trilogy: Book of Souls and The Keepers of the Library. Each of these books features FBI special agent, Will Piper. In addition, Cooper has written two stand-alone thrillers: The Tenth Chamber and The Devil Will Come. The fact that his sales in Europe have exceeded those in the United States has been frequently noted by critics. Cooper’s novels are often rooted in historical events. In addition, each of his books spotlights a large philosophical theme: fate and predestination, the nature of evil, conceptions of the afterlife, resurrection, and the interface between science and faith.

He is a sponsoring member of the International Thriller Writers.

== Bibliography ==
=== Will Piper / The Library Of The Dead series ===
- The Library of the Dead (originally released as The Secret of the Seventh Son) (2009)
- The Book of Souls (2010)
- The Library Card (2012) A tale, only in E-book
- The Keepers of the Library (2013)

=== John Camp / Down series ===
- Down: Pinhole (2014)
- Down: Portal (2015)
- Down: Floodgate (2016)

=== Cal Donovan Series ===
- Sign Of The Cross (2016)
- The Debt (2017)
- Three Marys (2018)
- The Showstone (2019)
- The Fourth Prophecy (2022)
- The Lost Pope (2023)
- The Last Conclave (2025)

=== Non-series books ===
- The Tenth Chamber (2011)
- The Devil Will Come (2011) note: this book is a sort of prequel of the Cal Donovan books series.
- Near Death (2012)
- The Resurrection maker (2013)
- The Cure (2020)
- The Taken Girls (2021)
- The Water Pope (2022)
- The Cosmos Keys: An Archaeological Thriller of Lost Civilizations (2025)
- The Last Conclave (2025)
- The Silence of Flesh: A Novel of Conscience, Identity, and Holy Vows (2025)
- The Physician of Nineveh (2025)

== Film production career ==
Cooper was a member of the Harvard Square Script Writers, a group of writers who work-shopped their screenplays. It was while a member of this group that he came across a script by Michael and Shawn Rasmussen called Long Distance, which he rewrote. While Cooper was accepted into the Boston University Masters of Fine Arts program in film production, he chose to drop out and produce Long Distance through his company Lascaux Pictures, now known as Lascaux Media, instead of completing his MFA by producing a thesis film. The film, starring Monica Keena, premiered at the Tribeca Film Festival in 2005 and was sold for distribution in 30 countries. Cooper, through Lascaux Media, has produced two other independent genre films: Dark Feed and The Inhabitants.
