= Gilford, New Hampshire =

- Town
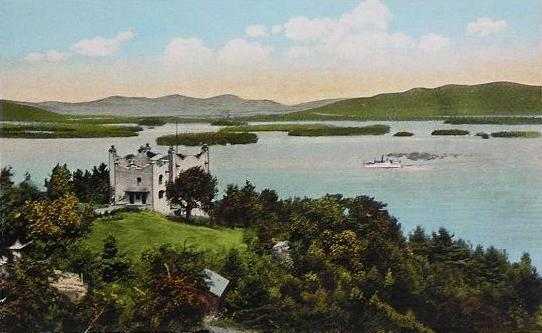
- Kimball Castle and Lake Winnipesaukee c. 1920

- Flag Seal

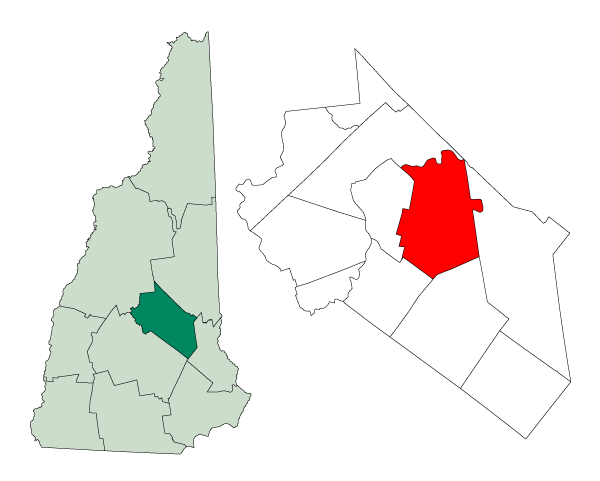
- Location in Belknap County, New Hampshire
- Coordinates: 43°32′51″N 71°24′26″W
- Country: United States
- State: New Hampshire
- County: Belknap
- Incorporated: 1812
- Villages: Gilford; Glendale

Government
  - Board of Selectmen: J. Kevin Hayes, Chair; Dale Channing Eddy; Gus Benavides
  - Town Administrator: Scott Dunn

Area
  - Total: 53.6 sq mi (138.7 km^{2})
  - Land: 38.8 sq mi (100.5 km^{2})
  - Water: 14.7 sq mi (38.2 km^{2}) 27.56%
- Elevation: 745 ft (227 m)

Population (2020)
  - Total: 7,699
  - Density: 198/sq mi (76.6/km^{2})
- Time zone: UTC-5 (Eastern)
  - Summer (DST): UTC-4 (Eastern)
- ZIP code: 03249
- Area code: 603
- FIPS code: 33-28740
- GNIS feature ID: 0873603
- Website: www.gilfordnh.gov

Gilford is a town in Belknap County, New Hampshire, United States. The population was 7,699 at the 2020 census, and an estimated 7,898 in 2025, up from 7,126 at the 2010 census. Situated on Lake Winnipesaukee, Gilford is home to Governors Island, Ellacoya State Beach, Belknap Mountain State Forest, Gunstock Mountain Resort, and the Bank of New Hampshire Pavilion, a seasonal outdoor concert venue. The lakeside village of Glendale lies within Gilford's borders.

== History ==
Settled in 1778 and originally a part of Gilmanton, the town was first called Gunstock Parish. In 1812, Captain Lemuel B. Mason, who had fought in the 1781 Battle of Guilford Court House in North Carolina during the Revolutionary War and subsequently retired to Gunstock Parish, successfully proposed incorporation of a new town to be named Guilford after that battle. The name would later be contracted by clerical error. The original parish name is used by Gunstock Mountain and the ski resort located on it.

Gilford was the destination of the first "snow train" from Boston in the 1930s. It also had New Hampshire’s first motorized ski lift, a gasoline-powered rope tow built in 1934 at what is now Gunstock Mountain Resort.

== Geography ==
According to the United States Census Bureau, the town has a total area of 53.6 square miles (138.7 km^{2}), of which 38.8 sq mi (100.5 km^{2}) are land and 14.7 sq mi (38.2 km^{2}) are water, comprising 27.56% of the town. Belknap Mountain, elevation 2,384 feet (727 m) above sea level and the highest point in Gilford as well as Belknap County, is in the south. Much of the town is drained by the Gunstock River, a tributary of Lake Winnipesaukee. Gilford lies fully within the Merrimack River watershed.

New Hampshire Route 11 crosses the town from east to west, connecting Alton and Rochester to the east with Laconia to the west. NH 11 joins U.S. Route 3 near the western border of Gilford, and together they turn south on the Laconia Bypass, which is largely within the Gilford town limits, traveling southwest towards Tilton and Franklin. New Hampshire Route 11A is an alternate east–west route to NH 11, passing through the center of Gilford and by the entrance to Gunstock Mountain Resort. New Hampshire Route 11B leaves NH 11 near Sanders Bay on Lake Winnipesaukee and proceeds northwest to Weirs Beach in Laconia.

=== Adjacent municipalities ===
- Moultonborough (north)
- Alton (east)
- Gilmanton (southeast)
- Belmont (south)
- Laconia (west)
- Meredith (northeast)

== Demographics ==
Historical population
Census	Pop.	Note	%±
1820	1,816		—
1830	1,872		3.1%
1840	2,072		10.7%
1850	2,432		17.4%
1860	2,811		15.6%
1870	3,361		19.6%
1880	2,821		−16.1%
1890	3,585		27.1%
1900	661		−81.6%
1910	744		12.6%
1920	738		−0.8%
1930	783		6.1%
1940	996		27.2%
1950	1,251		25.6%
1960	2,043		63.3%
1970	3,219		57.6%
1980	4,841		50.4%
1990	5,867		21.2%
2000	6,803		16.0%
2010	7,126		4.7%
2020	7,314		2.6%
2024 (est.)	7,886	▲	7.8%
U.S. Decennial Census

As of the 2000 census, there were 6,803 people, 2,766 households, and 2,019 families residing in the town. The population density was 174.6 inhabitants per square mile (67.4/km^{2}). There were 4,312 housing units at an average density of 110.6 per square mile (42.7/km^{2}). The racial makeup of the town was 98.32% White, 0.19% African American, 0.15% Native American, 0.51% Asian, 0.07% from other races, and 0.75% from two or more races. Hispanic or Latino of any race were 0.57% of the population.

There were 2,766 households, out of which 30.8% had children under the age of 18 living with them, 61.9% were married couples living together, 8.1% had a female householder with no husband present, and 27.0% were non-families. 21.7% of all households were made up of individuals, and 9.0% had someone living alone who was 65 years of age or older. The average household size was 2.46 and the average family size was 2.85.

In the town, the population was spread out, with 23.7% under the age of 18, 4.4% from 18 to 24, 25.4% from 25 to 44, 29.6% from 45 to 64, and 16.8% who were 65 years of age or older. The median age was 43 years. For every 100 females, there were 92.0 males. For every 100 females age 18 and over, there were 89.8 males.

The median income for a household in the town was $48,658, and the median income for a family was $56,554. Males had a median income of $38,839 versus $27,325 for females. The per capita income for the town was $32,667. About 2.2% of families and 3.3% of the population were below the poverty line, including 1.2% of those under age 18 and 2.7% of those age 65 or over.

== Government ==
Gilford city election results from state and federal races
Year	Office	Results
2008	President	McCain 50–49%
2008	Senator	Sununu 53–46%
2008	House	Bradley 52–47%
2008	Governor	Lynch 67–32%
2010	Senator	Ayotte 67–30%
2010	House	Guinta 58–38%
2010	Governor	Stephen 50–48%
2012	President	Romney 53–46%
2012	House	Guinta 50–46%
2012	Governor	Hassan 50–48%
2014	Senator	Brown 53–46%
2014	House	Guinta 56–44%
2014	Governor	Havenstein 51–48%
2016	President	Trump 54–42%
2016	Senator	Ayotte 53–44%
2016	House	Guinta 47–40%
2016	Governor	Sununu 55–41%
2018	House	Edwards 51–48%
2018	Governor	Sununu 62–37%
2020	President	Trump 52–47%
2020	Senator	Shaheen 52–47%
2020	House	Mowers 53–45%
2020	Governor	Sununu 73–26%
2022	Senator	Bolduc 51–47%
2022	House	Leavitt 52–47%
2022	Governor	Sununu 68–31%

In the New Hampshire Senate, Gilford is in the 7th district, represented by Republican Harold F. French. On the New Hampshire Executive Council, Gilford is in the 1st district, represented by Republican Joseph Kenney. In the United States House of Representatives, Gilford is in New Hampshire's 1st congressional district, represented by Democrat Chris Pappas.

== Education ==
The town is home to the Gilford High School.

== Sites of interest ==
- Bank of New Hampshire Pavilion
- John J. Morrill General Store (1857)
- Benjamin Rowe House (c. 1838)
- Union Meetinghouse (1834)
- Gunstock Mountain Resort
- Lake Winnipesaukee Sailing Association
- Kimball Castle

== Notable people ==
- Clay Cook (born 1978), member of Zac Brown Band, previous collaborator with John Mayer
- Glenn Cooper (born 1953), internationally best-selling author, film producer
- Stilson Hutchins (1838–1912), newspaper reporter, publisher (The Washington Post)
- Megan Lyman (born 1991), 2012 Miss New Hampshire
- Penny Pitou (born 1938), first U.S. woman to win an Olympic medal in downhill skiing
- Chris Sheridan (born 1967), writer and television producer (Family Guy)
- George Henry Weeks (1834–1905), Quartermaster General of the United States Army, born in Gilford
