= Mount Major =

Mountain in New Hampshire, United States

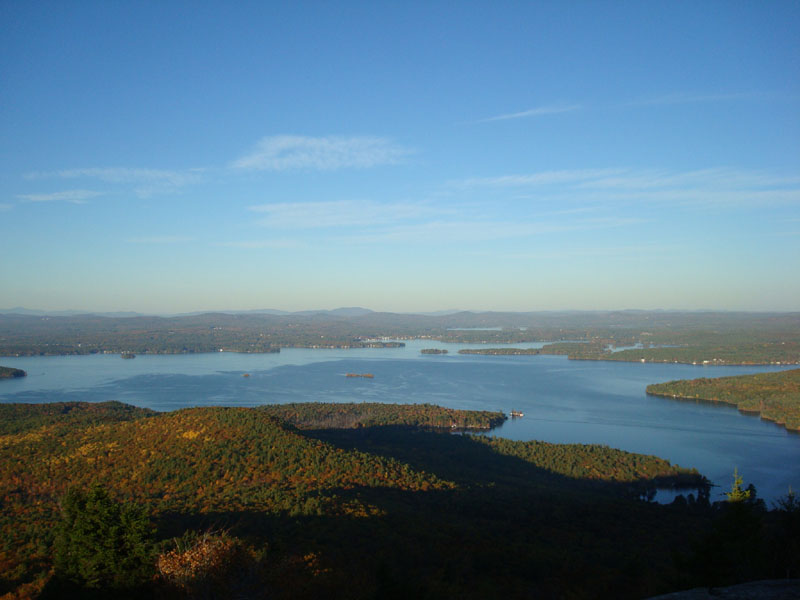
- Looking across Lake Winnipesaukee from the Mt. Major summit

Highest point
- Elevation: 1,786 ft (544 m)
- Prominence: 186 ft (57 m)
- Coordinates: 43°30′49″N 71°17′14″W

Geography
- Location: Alton, Belknap County, New Hampshire, U.S.
- Parent range: Belknap Mountains
- Topo map: USGS West Alton

Mount Major is a mountain located in Alton, New Hampshire, south of Lake Winnipesaukee and northeast of Straightback Mountain in the Belknap Range.

The scenic, rocky summit is a popular hiking destination, accessible by multiple trails including the Mount Major Trail, the Brook Trail, and the Boulder Loop.

The north, east and south faces of Mount Major drain into Lake Winnipesaukee, thence via the Winnipesaukee River into the Merrimack River and finally into the Gulf of Maine in Massachusetts. The west ridge of Mount Major rises only 186 feet (57 m) feet above the col with the higher Straightback Mountain. The Society for the Protection of New Hampshire Forests owns three parcels of land on the west, north, and east sides of the mountain.

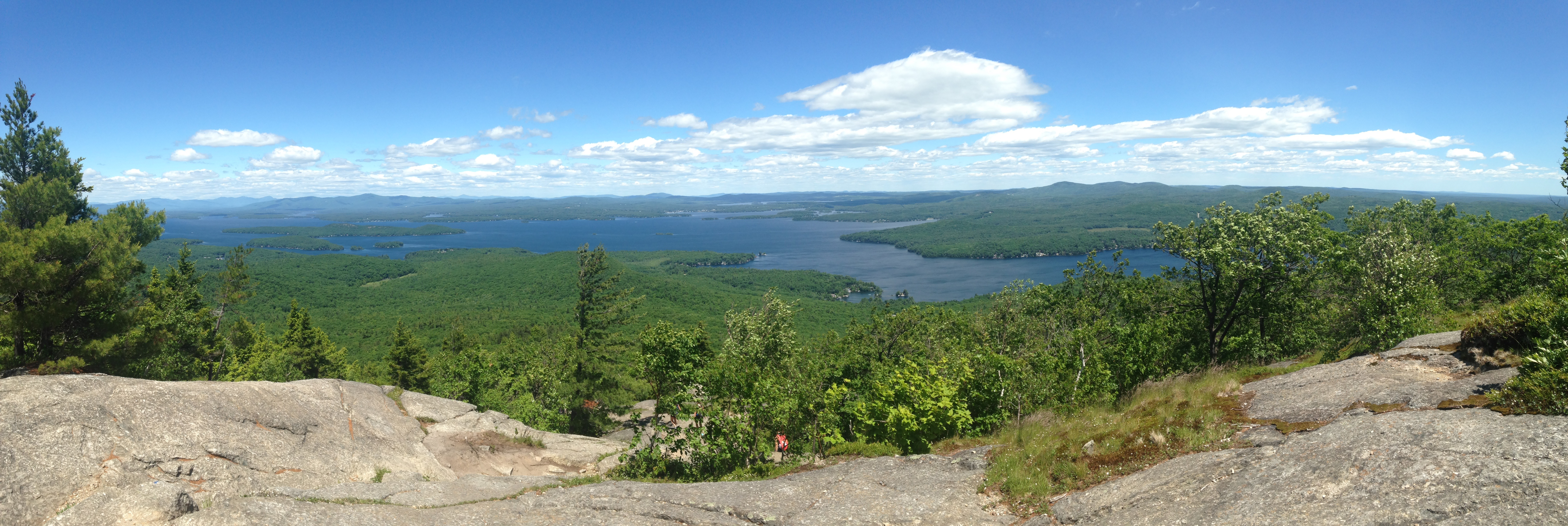
Panoramic view from Mount Major

== See also ==
- List of mountains in New Hampshire
