= Gunstock Knob =

Summit in West Virginia, United States

Coordinates: 38.5475945°N 81.4995678°W

Gunstock Knob is a summit in West Virginia, in the United States. With an elevation of 1,270 feet (390 m), Gunstock Knob is the 827th highest summit in the state of West Virginia.

Gunstock Knob was named for the fact an early settler fashioned a gun stock from the wood of a tree taken from the summit.
