= Gunstock Mountain =

Mountain in New Hampshire, United States

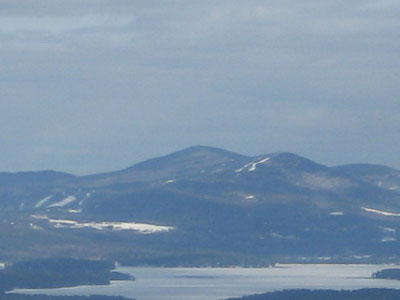
- Gunstock Mountain (right) as seen from Red Hill

Highest point
- Elevation: 2240+ ft (683+ m) NGVD 29
- Prominence: 220 ft (67 m)
- Coordinates: 43°31′32″N 71°22′42″W

Geography
- Location: Belknap County, New Hampshire, U.S.
- Parent range: Belknap Mountains
- Topo map: USGS Laconia

Gunstock Mountain is the second highest peak in the Belknap Mountains of central New Hampshire with an elevation greater than 2240 feet (683 m). It is located 1 mile (1.6 km) north of Belknap Mountain, the highest point in the range. It is home to the Gunstock Mountain Resort ski area. The ski resort has been written up in national ski magazines for its views of Lake Winnipesaukee.

Gunstock Mountain stands within the watershed of the Merrimack River, which drains into the Gulf of Maine in Massachusetts. The east side of the mountain, on which the ski resorted is located, drains into Poorfarm Brook, then into Lake Winnipesaukee, the Winnipesaukee River, and the Merrimack. The west side of the mountain drains into the Gunstock River, then into Lake Winnipesaukee.

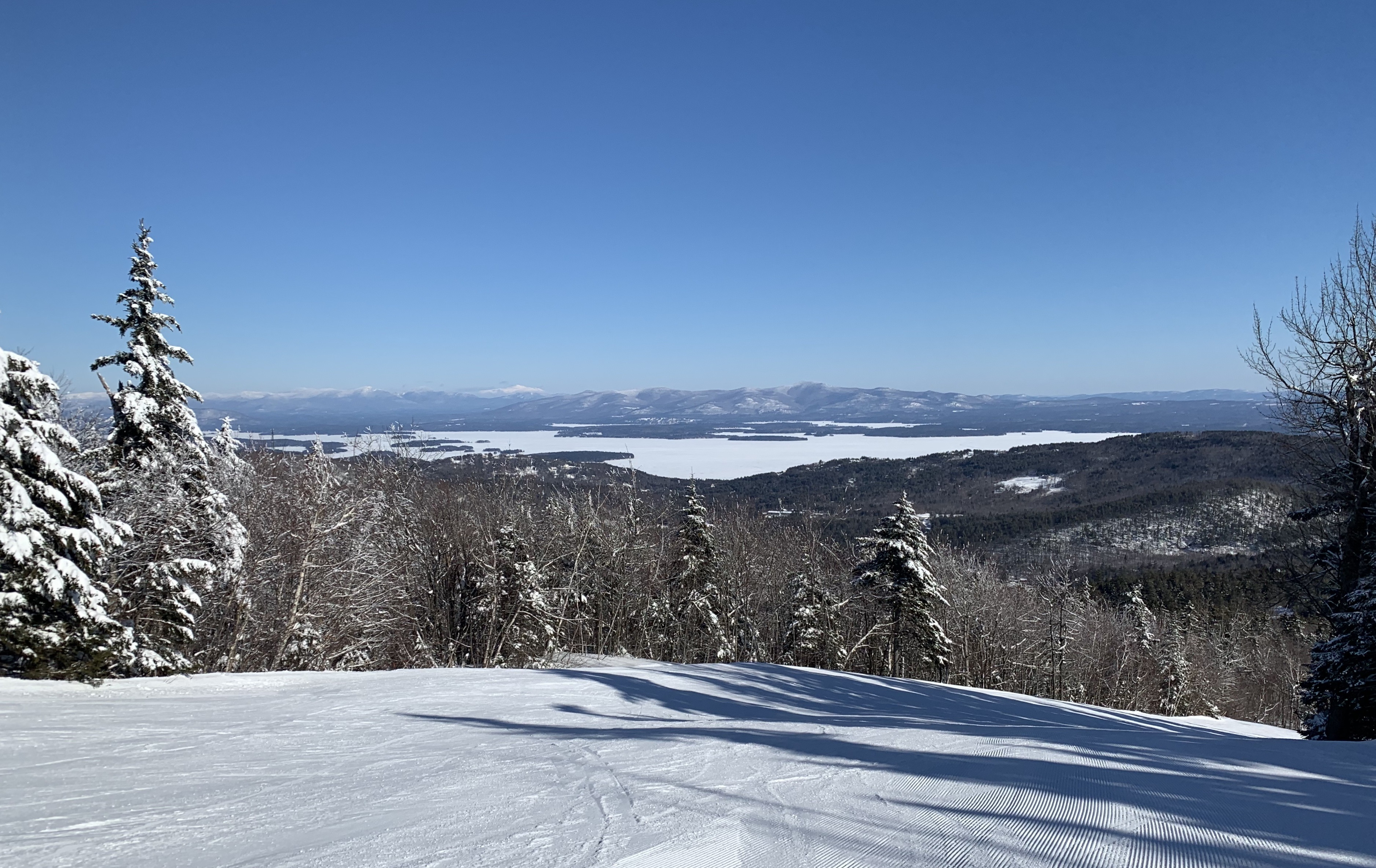
Lake Winnipesaukee, with Mount Washington and the snow-capped Presidential Range on the horizon, seen from Gunstock Mountain Resort

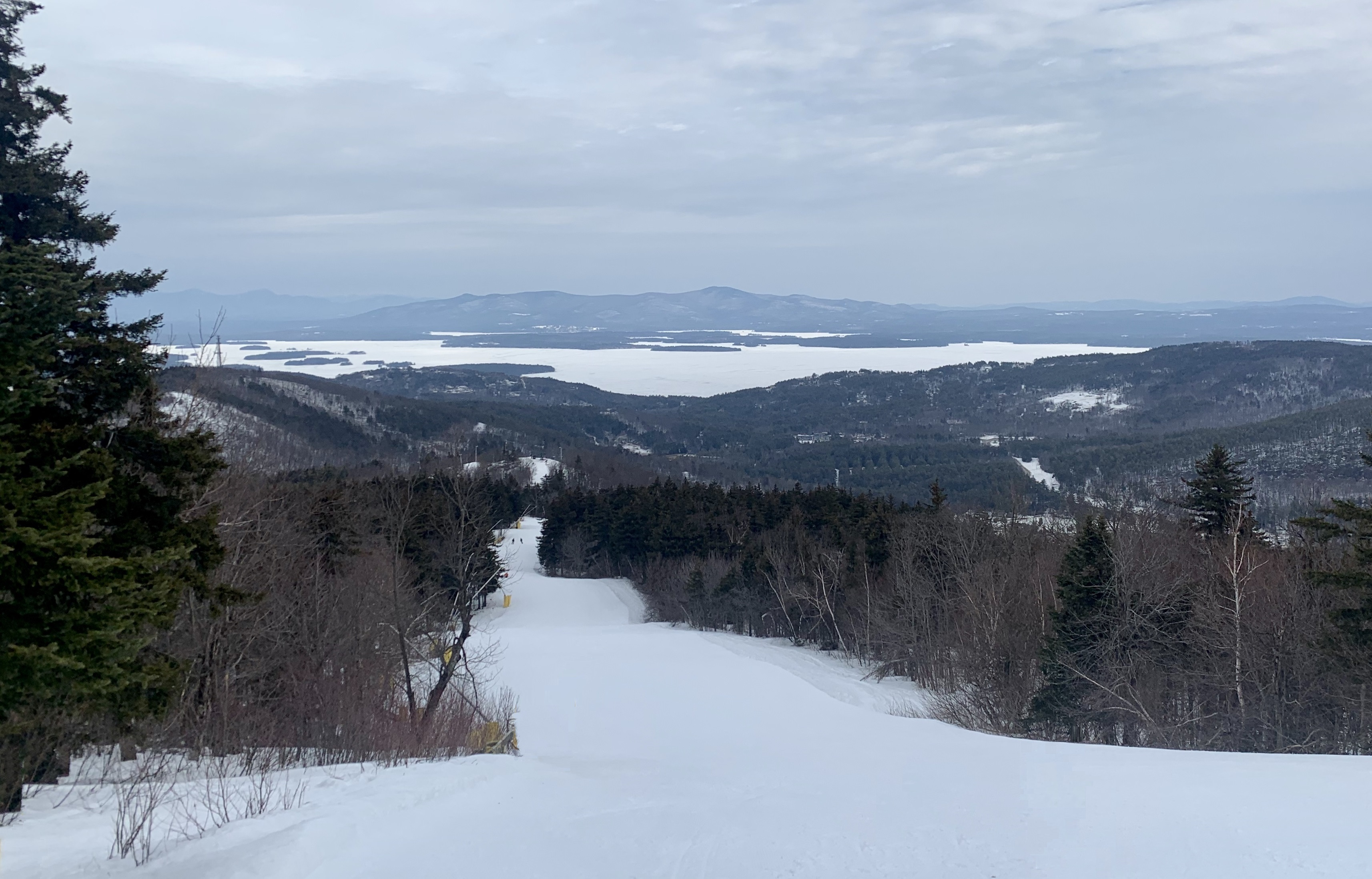
Gunstock Mountain has numerous panoramic views of the New Hampshire Lakes Region, here of Lake Winnipesaukee.
