= Gunstock River =

- Location within New Hampshire Location within the United States

Location
- Country: United States
- State: New Hampshire
- County: Belknap
- Town: Gilford

Physical characteristics
- Source: Piper Mountain
  - location: Gilford
  - coordinates: 43°30′1″N 71°23′13″W
  - elevation: 1,320 ft (400 m)
- Mouth: Sanders Bay, Lake Winnipesaukee
  - location: Gilford
  - coordinates: 43°34′54″N 71°24′20″W
  - elevation: 504 ft (154 m)
- Length: 6.4 mi (10.3 km)

The Gunstock River is a 6.4-mile-long (10.3 km) river in the Lakes Region of central New Hampshire in the United States. It is a tributary of Lake Winnipesaukee, part of the Merrimack River watershed.

The Gunstock River is entirely within the town of Gilford. It rises in the southern part of town, west of Piper Mountain, and flows north, collecting streamflow from the west side of the Belknap Range. The river flows through a wide valley in the center of Gilford, passing the town's middle and high schools, then drops through a steep ravine before reaching flat ground near Lake Winnipesaukee. The river enters the lake at Sanders Bay, near the junction of Routes 11 and 11B.

== See also ==
- List of rivers of New Hampshire
