= Gunstock Mountain Resort =

Outdoor recreation complex

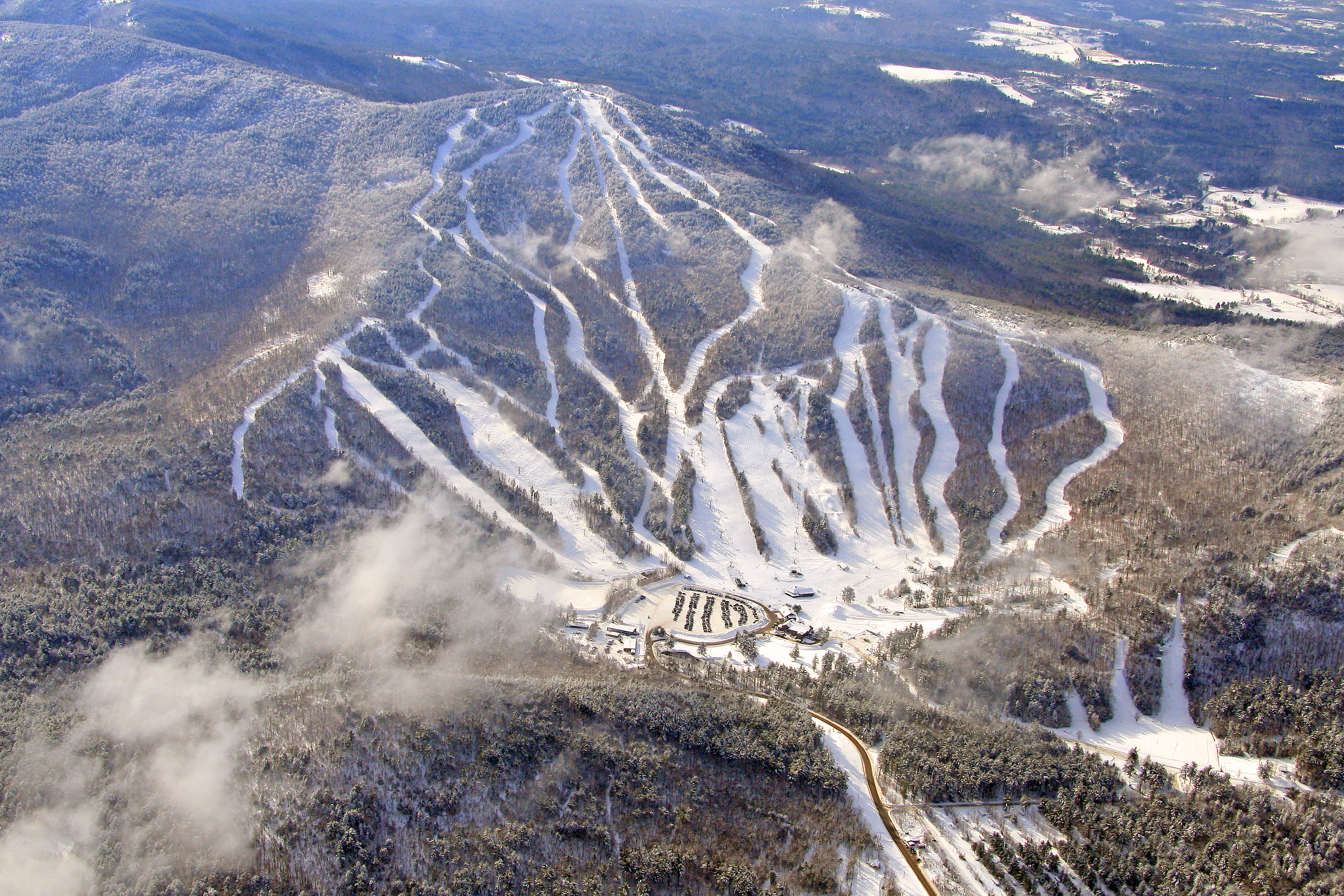
- Aerial view of Gunstock Mountain Resort in 2007
- Interactive map of Gunstock Mountain Resort
- Location: Gilford, New Hampshire, USA
- Mountain: Gunstock Mountain
- Nearest city: Laconia, New Hampshire
- Coordinates: 43°32′29″N 71°22′03″W
- Vertical: 1,340 feet (410 m)
- Top elevation: 2,267 feet (691 m)
- Base elevation: 867 feet (264 m)
- Skiable area: 2,200 acres (890 ha)
- Trails: 44 (plus 5 glades); 15% Novice; 52% Intermediate; 31% Advanced; 2% Expert
- Longest run: Flintlock to Stonebar 1.5 miles (2.4 km)
- Lift system: 1 HSQ, 2 Quads, 2 Triples, 2 Surface
- Terrain parks: Yes
- Snowfall: 120 inches (300 cm)
- Snowmaking: 98%
- Night skiing: 25 trails 6 lifts
- Website: www.gunstock.com

NH State Register of Historic Places
- Designated: January 30, 2012

Gunstock Mountain Resort, originally known as Belknap Mountain Recreation Area, is an outdoor recreation complex located on Gunstock Mountain in Gilford, New Hampshire. Constructed by the Works Progress Administration, it was completed in 1937 and is owned by Belknap County. Activities include alpine and cross-country skiing, snow tubing, ski jumping, snowshoeing, hiking, and swimming.

== History ==
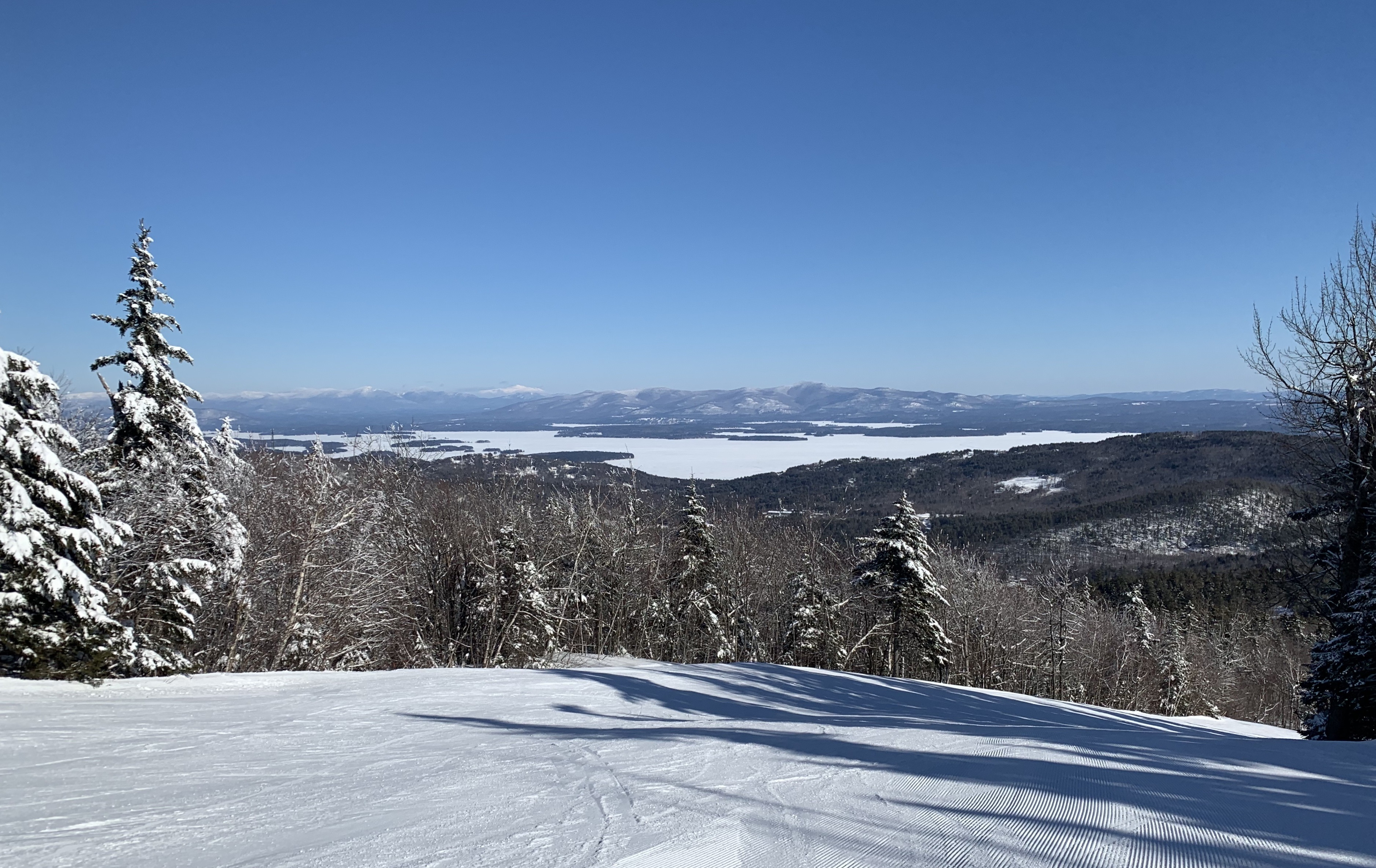
Lake Winnipesaukee, with Mount Washington and the snow-capped Presidential Range on the horizon

Originally known as Belknap Mountain Recreation Area, Gunstock Mountain Resort was built by the Works Progress Administration, a New Deal agency that provided employment and created public works projects throughout the United States during the Great Depression. Hussey Manufacturing Company of North Berwick, Maine, led hundreds of previously unemployed laborers in the development of the recreation area, which transformed the economy of the region. The resort had the first chairlift in the eastern United States. After the completion of the 60-meter ski jump, the first meet was held in February 1937.

In 1960, Belknap had 11 ski runs, four ski jumps, one chairlift, one T-bar lift, three rope-tows, a lodge and restaurant, and lift fees were US$4 for all lifts or $2.50 for rope-tows.

The original Gunstock chairlift development was located on Mount Rowe. This single-chairlift-serviced ski area was eventually phased out when two double chairlifts were installed to the Gunstock Mountain summit. Some of the old trails are still visible today.

In keeping with the gun theme, most of the trails are named for guns (i.e. Pistol, Musket, and Flintlock) or gun parts (i.e. Ramrod and Trigger).

Gunstock underwent a significant capital improvement plan in the 1980s with the installation of the Tiger Triple, the Summit Triple (replacing the two summit double chairlifts), and the Ramrod Quad.

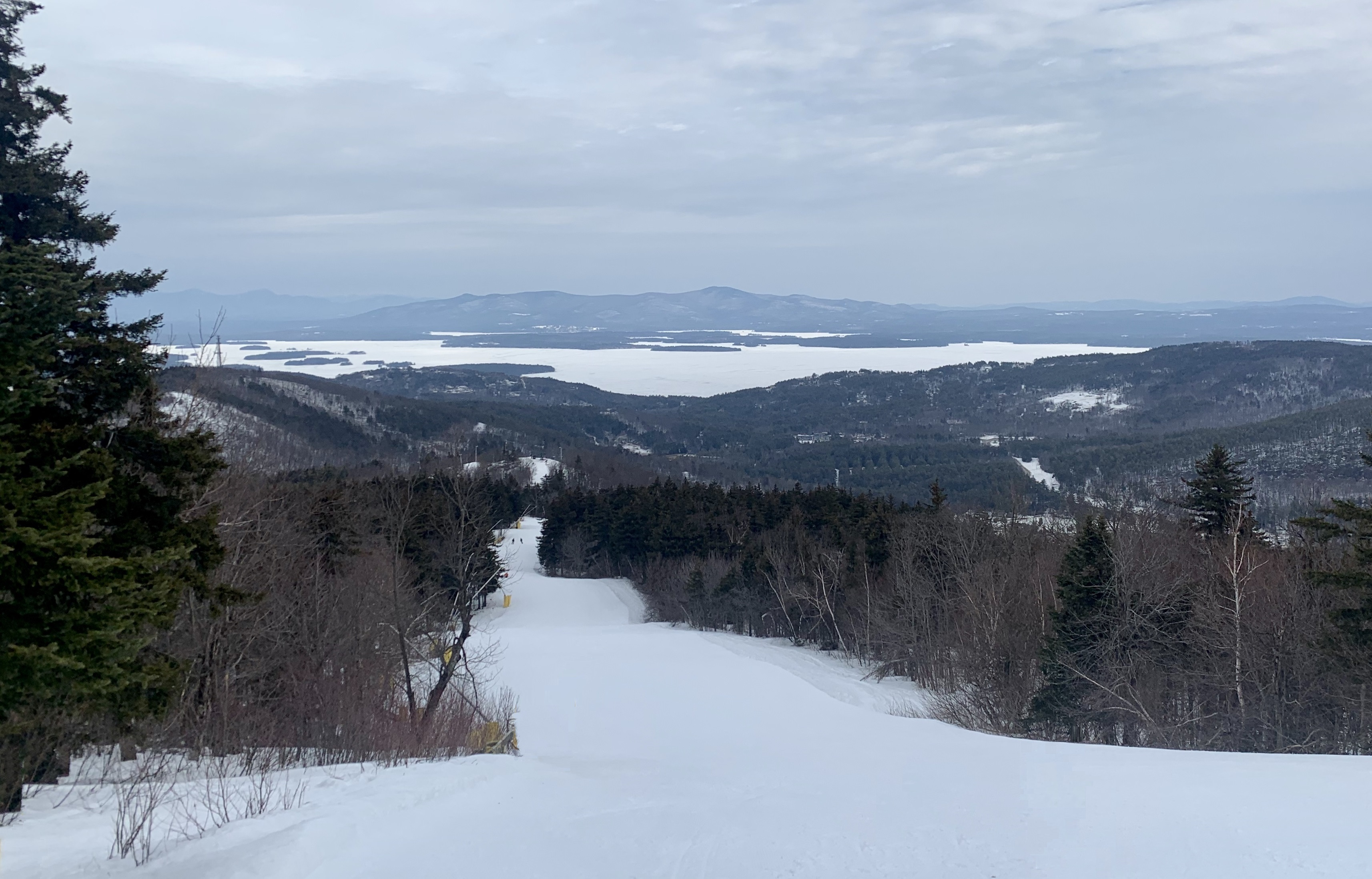
61% of the resort's 55 trails are designated Intermediate in difficulty.

In the summer of 2003, the Summit Triple Chairlift was moved to the Pistol Complex to replace the Pistol Double. A brand-new detachable quad chairlift manufactured by Doppelmayr CTEC, Panorama, was built in its place. This was the first UNI-GS chairlift in the entire world, and cut the ride to the summit in half, making it a six-minute trip.

In the summer of 2009, Gunstock underwent a $4 million expansion effort to make the mountain more family-friendly and easier for learners. The biggest project was the installation of a new fixed-grip, 1,207-foot-long (368 m) quad chairlift placed near the Gunshy Double Chairlift. This chairlift now has access to the new beginner-friendly complex that was constructed as part of the expansion effort. There are four new trails, and existing trails were lengthened and made wider. In addition, the mountain expanded their snow-making capabilities by 66% over the entire mountain.

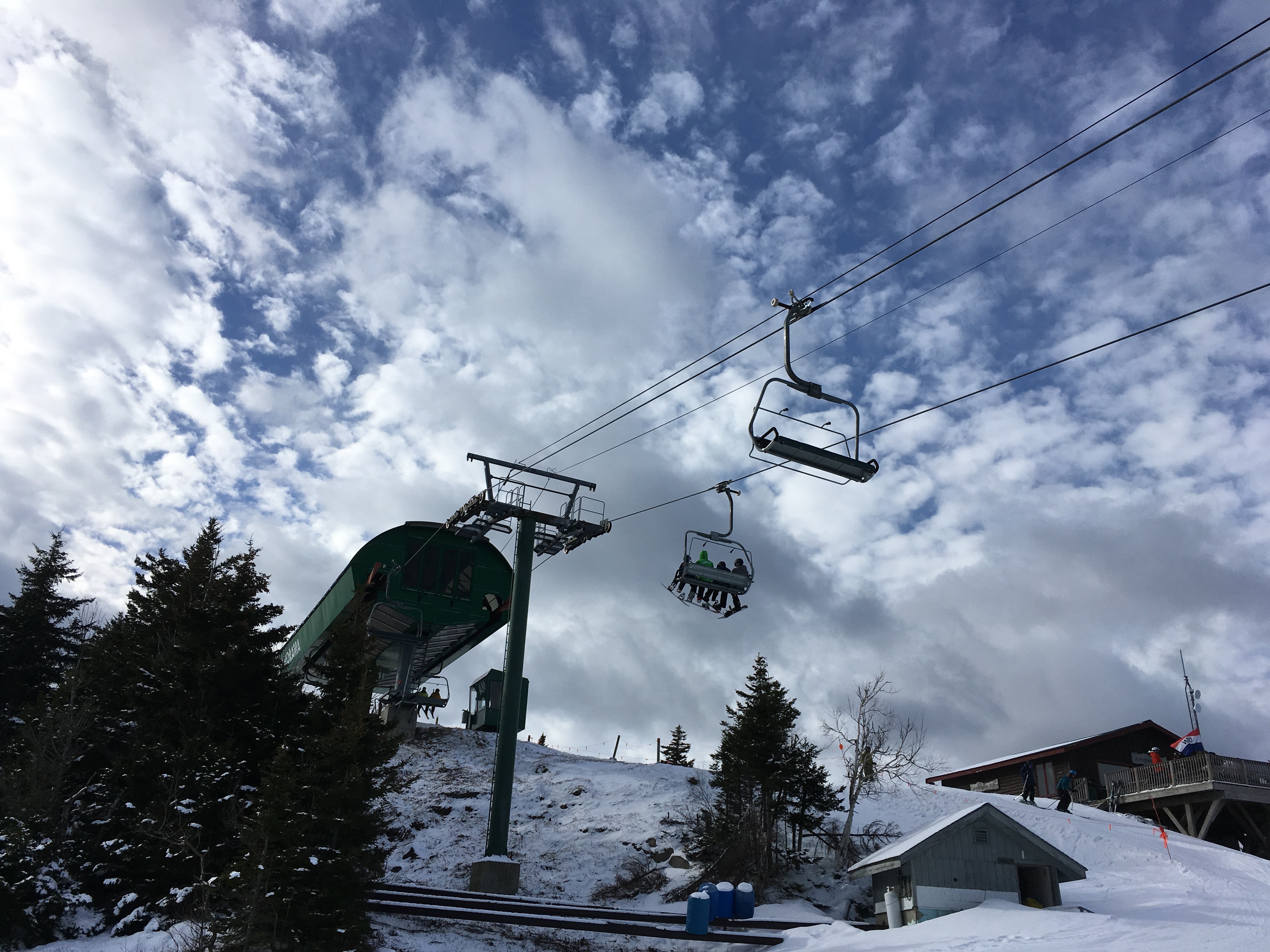
The top terminal of Gunstock's Panorama High Speed Quad

At the Pistol complex side of the mountain, two trails gained snow-making capabilities. The Blundersmoke Terrain Park received new permanent snow guns, and the Side Arm trail was widened by over 50 feet (15 m). A new glades trail named "Parallax Glades" was cut between Out of Sight and Side Arm.

The summer of 2016 added a mountain coaster to Gunstock's list of attractions. The coaster operates both in the summer and winter.

On the night of July 20, 2022, the entirety of the resort's management team resigned due to overreach by the Gunstock Area Commission after members of the commission tried to take a "larger stake of control" over the daily operations of the resort along with accusations of disrespecting the resort's staff. The following day, the resort closed "until further notice". The closure was resolved after 13 days, with the management team returning to work.

Following a ski season that saw mechanical issues with Gunstock Mountain Resort’s Panorama chairlift, including a 6 day stretch where it was inoperable, Gunstock Area Commission announced that they will be focusing on mechanical upgrades to their lift system in the 2025 offseason.

== Night skiing ==
Gunstock features night skiing on its lower mountain slopes. The detachable quad and the upper mountain trails are not lit.

Snow tubing is also available on certain nights.

Gunstock hosts an annual glowstick themed night terrain park competition called "Glow and Throw" during the ski season.
