= Lake Winnipesaukee =

Lake in New Hampshire, U.S.

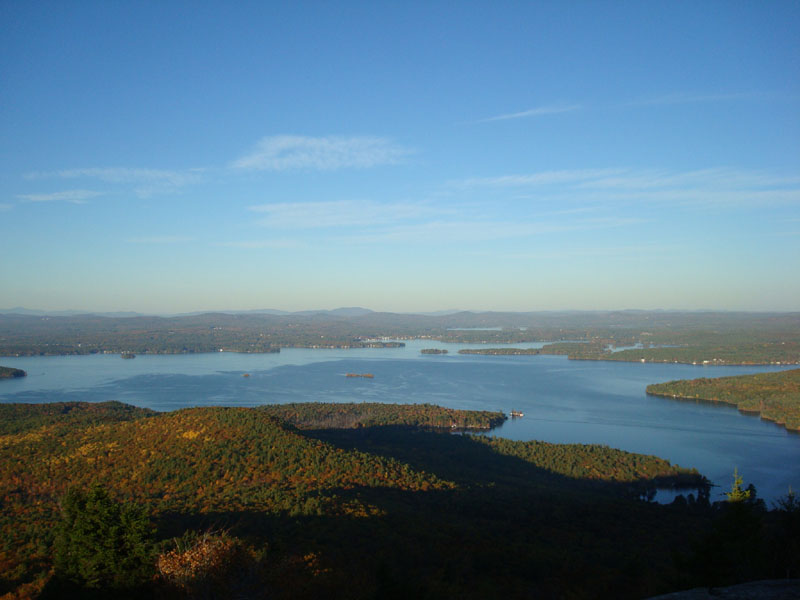
- Lake Winnipesaukee from the summit of Mt. Major

- Location within New Hampshire Location within the United States
- Interactive map of Lake Winnipesaukee
- Location: Belknap and Carroll counties, New Hampshire
- Coordinates: 43°36′N 71°20′W
- Primary inflows: Gunstock River; Merrymeeting River; Melvin River; Red Hill River; Lake Waukewan canal
- Primary outflows: Winnipesaukee River
- Basin countries: United States
- Max. length: 20.8 mi (33.5 km)
- Max. width: 9.0 mi (14.5 km)
- Surface area: 71 sq mi (180 km^{2})
- Max. depth: 180 ft (55 m)
- Shore length^{1}: 288 mi (463 km)
- Surface elevation: 504 ft (154 m)
- Islands: 258
- Settlements: see article
- ^{1} Shore length is not a well-defined measure.

Lake Winnipesaukee (/ˌwɪnɪpəˈsɔːki/) is the largest lake in the U.S. state of New Hampshire, located in the Lakes Region at the foothills of the White Mountains. It is approximately 21 miles (34 km) long (northwest-southeast) and from 1 to 9 miles (1.6 to 14.5 km) wide (northeast-southwest), covering 69 square miles (179 km^{2})—71 square miles (184 km^{2}) when Paugus Bay is included—with a maximum depth of 180 feet (55 m). The center area of the lake is called The Broads.

The lake contains at least 264 islands, half of which are less than 0.25 acres (0.10 ha) in size, and is indented by several peninsulas, yielding a total shoreline of approximately 288 miles (463 km). The driving distance around the lake is 63 miles (101 km). It is 504 feet (154 m) above sea level. Winnipesaukee is the third-largest lake in New England after Lake Champlain and Moosehead Lake.

Outflow is regulated by the Lakeport Dam in Lakeport, New Hampshire, on the Winnipesaukee River.

== History ==
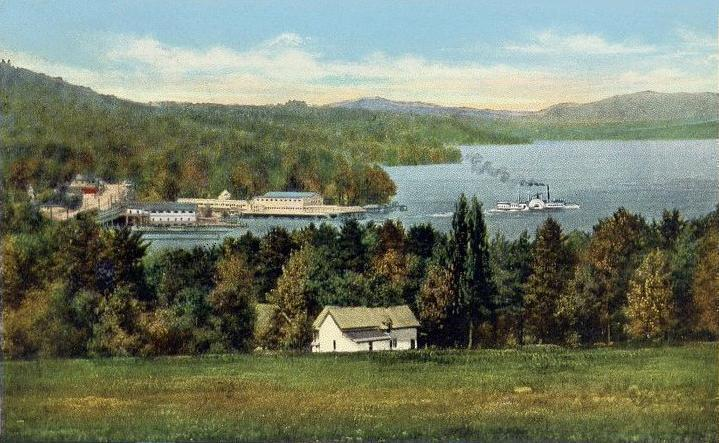
The Weirs, c. 1920

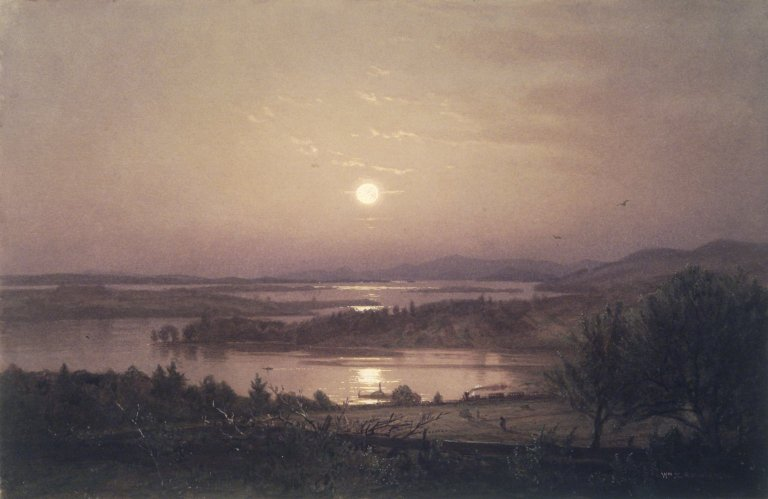
Lake Winnipesaukee, by William Trost Richards

The name Winnipesaukee (often spelled "Winnipiseogee" in earlier centuries) comes from the Abenaki name Wiwninbesoki, meaning "the land that surrounds the lake". Earlier etymologies suggested the name meant either "smile of the Great Spirit" or "beautiful water in a high place". At the outlet of the lake, the Winnipesaukee people, a subtribe of the Pennacook, lived and fished at a village called Acquadocton. Today, the site is called The Weirs, named for the weirs that were noted by the colonists when first exploring the region.

Lake Winnipesaukee has been a popular tourist destination for more than a century, particularly among residents of Boston and New York City. It is also home to several children's summer camps.

Winnipesaukee is a glacial lake but an unusual one, since the last glaciation actually reversed the flow of its waters. Draining the central portion of New Hampshire, it once flowed southeast, leaving via what is now Alton Bay toward the Atlantic Ocean. When glacial debris blocked this path, flow was redirected westward through Paugus Bay into the Winnipesaukee River. The latter flows west from the lake and joins the Pemigewasset River in Franklin to form the Merrimack River, which flows south to Massachusetts and into the Atlantic.

Center Harbor witnessed the first intercollegiate sporting event in the United States, as Harvard defeated Yale by two lengths in the first Harvard–Yale Regatta on August 3, 1852. The outcome was repeated 100 years later when the schools celebrated the centennial of the race by again competing on Lake Winnipesaukee (Harvard winning by 2.7 seconds).

== Cities and towns ==
The communities that surround the lake, clockwise from the southernmost town, are:

- Alton, the largest town by area in the Lakes Region.
- Gilford, home to Gunstock Mountain Resort and Bank of New Hampshire Pavilion at Meadowbrook, a popular New Hampshire concert venue.
- Laconia, the main commercial city on the lake. Included in Laconia is Weirs Beach, the largest public beach on Winnipesaukee. Every year Laconia is home to Bike Week, attracting tens of thousands of motorcyclists to the area.
- Meredith, a tourist haven on the northwestern reach of the lake.
- Center Harbor, a small town in Belknap County which serves as the winter home for the MS Mount Washington.
- Moultonborough, with its Castle in the Clouds, an estate atop a small mountain.
- Tuftonboro, which contains the communities of Melvin Village and Mirror Lake.
- Wolfeboro, which bills itself as the "Oldest Summer Resort in America".

== Divisions ==
The lake consists of a wide, relatively open central region known as the Broads, surrounded by several large bays, as well as many smaller inlets.

The daytime speed limit for boats on the entire lake is 45 miles per hour (72 km/h).

The main sections of the lake are:

=== The Broads ===
The Broads are a wide portion of Lake Winnipesaukee largely in Belknap County and extending slightly into Carroll County. It is a large island-free zone occupying the center of the lake.

Running along the main axis of the lake, the northwestern tip of the Broads is at the town of Center Harbor, while the southeastern end lies between the towns of Alton and Wolfeboro.

=== Meredith Bay ===
Meredith Bay lies at the western edge of Winnipesaukee. At the northern tip of Meredith Bay is the main village of the town of Meredith. Paugus Bay branches off to the south of Meredith Bay at Weirs Beach, near to where Meredith Bay joins the main body of the lake. Meredith Bay is separated from the Broads by a relatively narrow strait bordered by Governors Island to the south and Stonedam Island to the north. The northeastern shore of Meredith Bay is a long peninsula known as Meredith Neck.

=== Paugus Bay ===
Formerly a hydrologically distinct lake, Paugus Bay became joined to Winnipesaukee when the dam at Lakeport was constructed, raising the surface of Paugus Bay to be contiguous with Winnipesaukee. Paugus Bay joins the main lake in Meredith Bay, running south from a narrow channel connecting it to Meredith Bay. At the northern end of Paugus Bay, where it joins the main lake, is Weirs Beach, the largest and most visited public beach on the lake. At the other end is the village of Lakeport. Both Weirs Beach and Lakeport are villages within the city of Laconia. The eastern shore of the bay is closely followed by U.S. Route 3, and has numerous motels, hotels, inns, and bungalow complexes. The western shore is much less developed.

=== Alton Bay ===
Alton Bay is a narrow bay which runs due south from the southern corner of the main lake. It lies entirely within the town of Alton. The village of Alton Bay lies at the extreme southern tip.

=== Wolfeboro Bay ===
Wolfeboro Bay is a relatively small wide bay lying in the town of Wolfeboro, creating a small northerly bulge in the shoreline to the eastern edge of Winnipesaukee. A series of smaller lakes and streams connects Wolfeboro Bay to Lake Wentworth.

=== Winter Harbor ===
Winter Harbor is a Y-shaped bay with two branches, separated from the Broads by Wolfeboro Neck and Tuftonboro Neck. Winter Harbor is surrounded by many quiet resort communities in the towns of Wolfeboro and Tuftonboro. It also has panoramic views of the Belknap Mountains and looks out toward Rattlesnake Island.

=== Moultonborough Bay ===
The longest bay on Winnipesaukee is Moultonborough Bay. It is connected to the Broads by some narrow straits running between a cluster of islands including Long Island (the largest island in the lake), Cow Island, Little Bear Island, Sandy Island, and dozens of smaller islands and islets. The 7-mile-long (11 km) Moultonborough Neck separates the length of the bay from the main axis of the lake, and the Suissevale development in the town of Moultonborough is at the northern tip of the bay. Melvin Village, the main lakeside village of the town of Tuftonboro lies along the northeastern shore of the bay, closer to where it joins the Broads.

== Islands ==
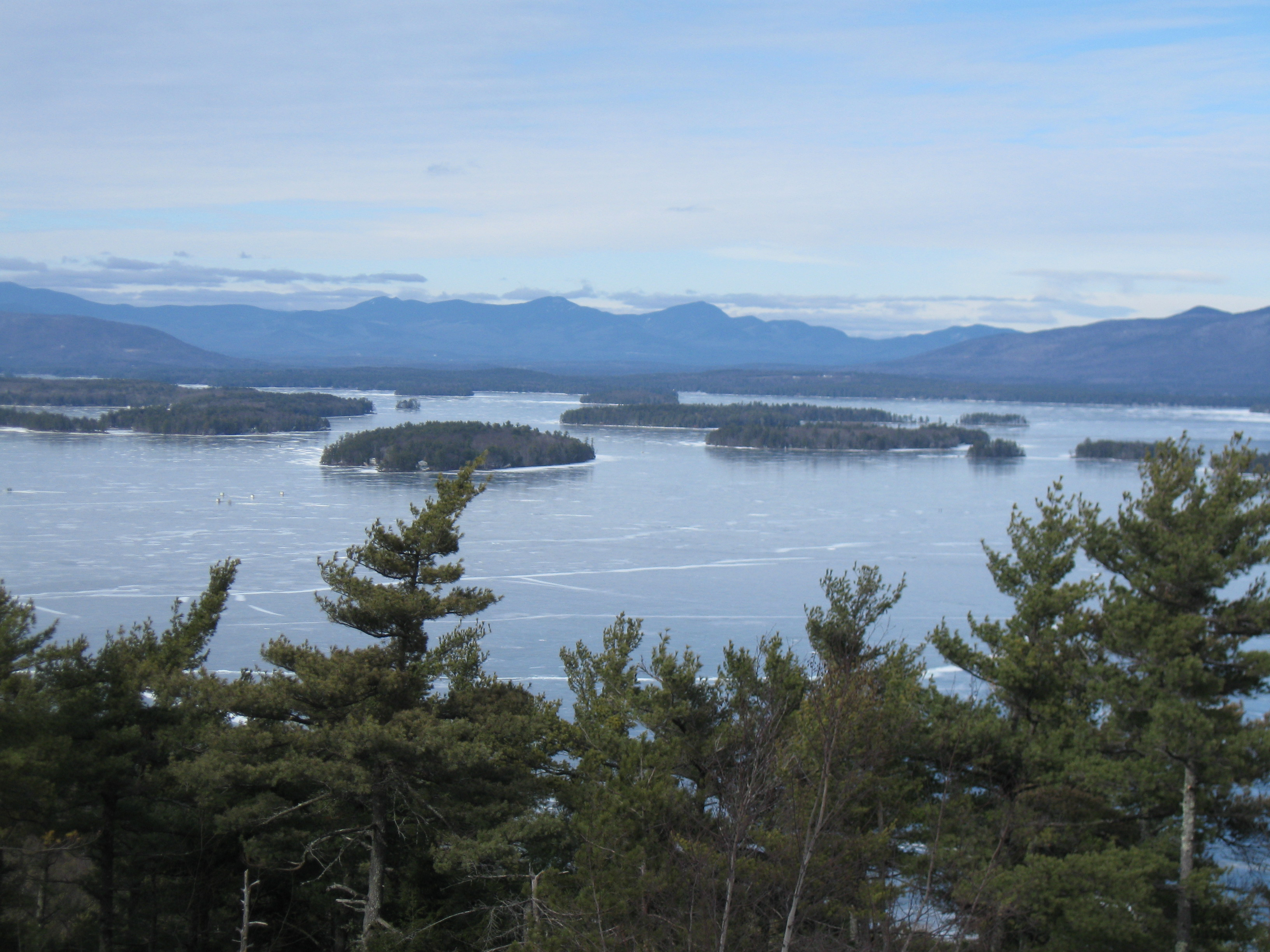
Ice-covered Lake Winnipesaukee, February 2010, looking north toward the Sandwich Range

There are at least 258 natural islands on Lake Winnipesaukee that are at least 3 feet (0.9 m) above lake level and contain vegetation, about 130 of which are over .25 acres (0.10 ha) in size. 26 of these are 25 acres (10 ha) or larger:

- Long Island—1,186 acres (480 ha)
- Bear Island—780 acres (320 ha)
- Cow Island—522 acres (211 ha)
- Governors Island—504 acres (204 ha)
- Rattlesnake Island—368 acres (149 ha)
- Welch Island—187 acres (76 ha)
- Little Bear Island—143 acres (58 ha)
- Stonedam Island—141 acres (57 ha)
- Timber Island—136 acres (55 ha)
- Sleepers Island—113 acres (46 ha)
- Mark Island—102 acres (41 ha)
- Black Island—90 acres (36 ha)
- Barndoor Island—88 acres (36 ha)
- Black Cat Island—75 acres (30 ha)
- Pine Island—74 acres (30 ha)
- Whortleberry Island—69 acres (28 ha)
- Sandy Island—67 acres (27 ha)
- Jolly Island—50 acres (20 ha)
- Three Mile Island—47 acres (19 ha)
- Round Island—43 acres (17 ha)
- Lockes Island—42 acres (17 ha)
- Diamond Island—37 acres (15 ha)
- Dow Island—32 acres (13 ha)
- Big Beaver Island—30 acres (12 ha)
- Camp Island—28 acres (11 ha)
- Mink Island—26 acres (11 ha)
- Birch Island—25 acres (10 ha)

Six islands are connected to the mainland by bridges (Black Cat, Governors, Long, Oak, Christmas (or Plummers) in Paugus Bay, and Worcester), and another eight (Bear, Birch, Cow, East Bear, Jolly, Loon, Three Mile, and Sandy) are served by the U.S. mail boat M/V Sophie C.

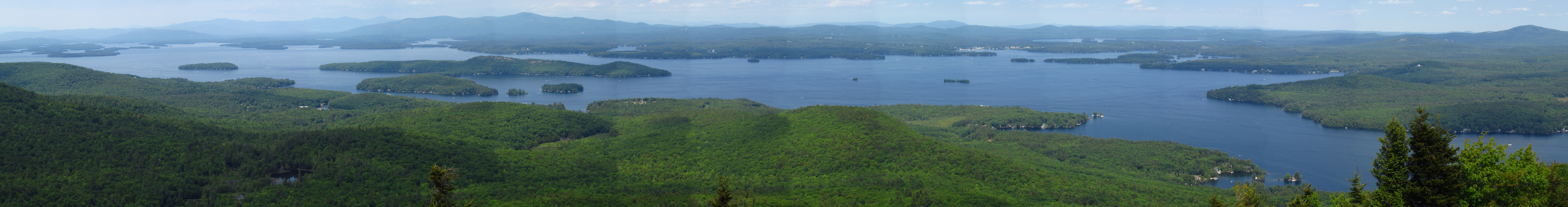
Panoramic view of Lake Winnipesaukee looking north from the summit of Mount Major. The entrance to Alton Bay lies at the right edge of the picture. The large island near the center-left is Rattlesnake Island, while the three islands in front of it (l-r) are Sleeper's Island, Cub Island, and Treasure Island. The island to the left of Rattlesnake Island is Diamond Island. Wolfeboro Bay is visible at the far side of the lake near the center-right of the image.

== Lakes Region ==
Along with the rest of New Hampshire's Lakes Region, which also encompasses Lake Winnisquam, Lake Wentworth, Squam Lake, Newfound Lake, and numerous other smaller lakes and ponds, Winnipesaukee has been a vacation community for at least a century, particularly drawing people from the Boston region. The area is home to numerous summer theater troupes and offers a variety of land and water recreational activities. There are numerous hiking trails in and around the surrounding mountains, which include the Ossipee Mountains to the east, the Belknap Range to the west, and Red Hill to the north.

== Ships ==
=== Steamship Mount Washington and her successor ===
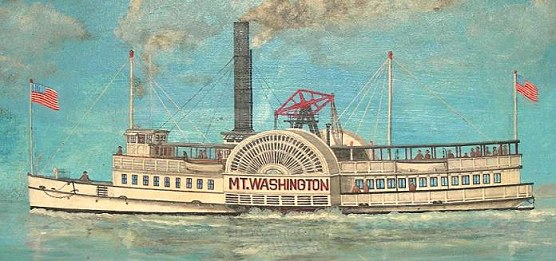
The Mount Washington Under Full Speed Ahead, 2006, painted by Peter Buck

The paddlesteamer MS Mount Washington, named after the highest of New Hampshire's White Mountains, was launched in spring 1872 to carry mail, goods, and passengers on Lake Winnipesaukee, under the flag of the Boston and Maine Railroad. With a hull length of 178 feet (54 m) and a beam of 49 feet (15 m) she appeared as a typical representative of the North American sidewheelers around the second half of the century and was the largest steamer on the lake at that time. The huge paddle wheels were driven by a single-cylinder steam engine of 450 hp (340 kW) at approximately 26 rpm. The power was transferred from the vertical single cylinder to the wheel shaft by the walking beam, high above the upper deck, oscillating in the frequency of the paddle wheels. Known as "The Mount", her kitchen and restaurant service became famous.

On December 23, 1939, a nearby railroad station caught fire from an overheated stove. The fire soon spread to the ship, tied at the dock, and destroyed it. Efforts to cut Mount Washington loose were to no avail as it was a time of extremely low water and the hull was stuck fast in the mud of the lake bottom. Soon after, a local company was formed to build a new ship. Since Europe was already at war, and the US was stocking steel in a pre-war munitions build-up obtaining steel was impossible. Instead, they purchased an old sidewheel vessel on Lake Champlain: the Chateaugay, a 203-foot (62 m), iron-hulled sidewheeler that was being used as a club house for the Burlington yacht club. It was cut into sections by Boston General Ship & Engine Works and transported to Lake Winnipesaukee on rail cars. A new twin-screw vessel was designed for the hull being welded back together at Lakeport. Powered by two steam engines taken from another ocean-going yacht, the new MS Mount Washington made her maiden voyage on August 15, 1940.

Two years after her launch, the new Mount Washington's engines and boilers were removed for use in a navy vessel during World War II. After the war, Mount Washington returned to the water. The ship was a success in the post-war tourist boom.

In 1982, Mount Washington was cut open and extended with an additional 20-foot (6.1 m) hull section to add larger lounge and food service facilities. Still popular, she makes one or two round trips on the lake per day during the summer season, as well as numerous dinner dance cruises in the evenings.

=== Mailboat M/V Sophie C. ===
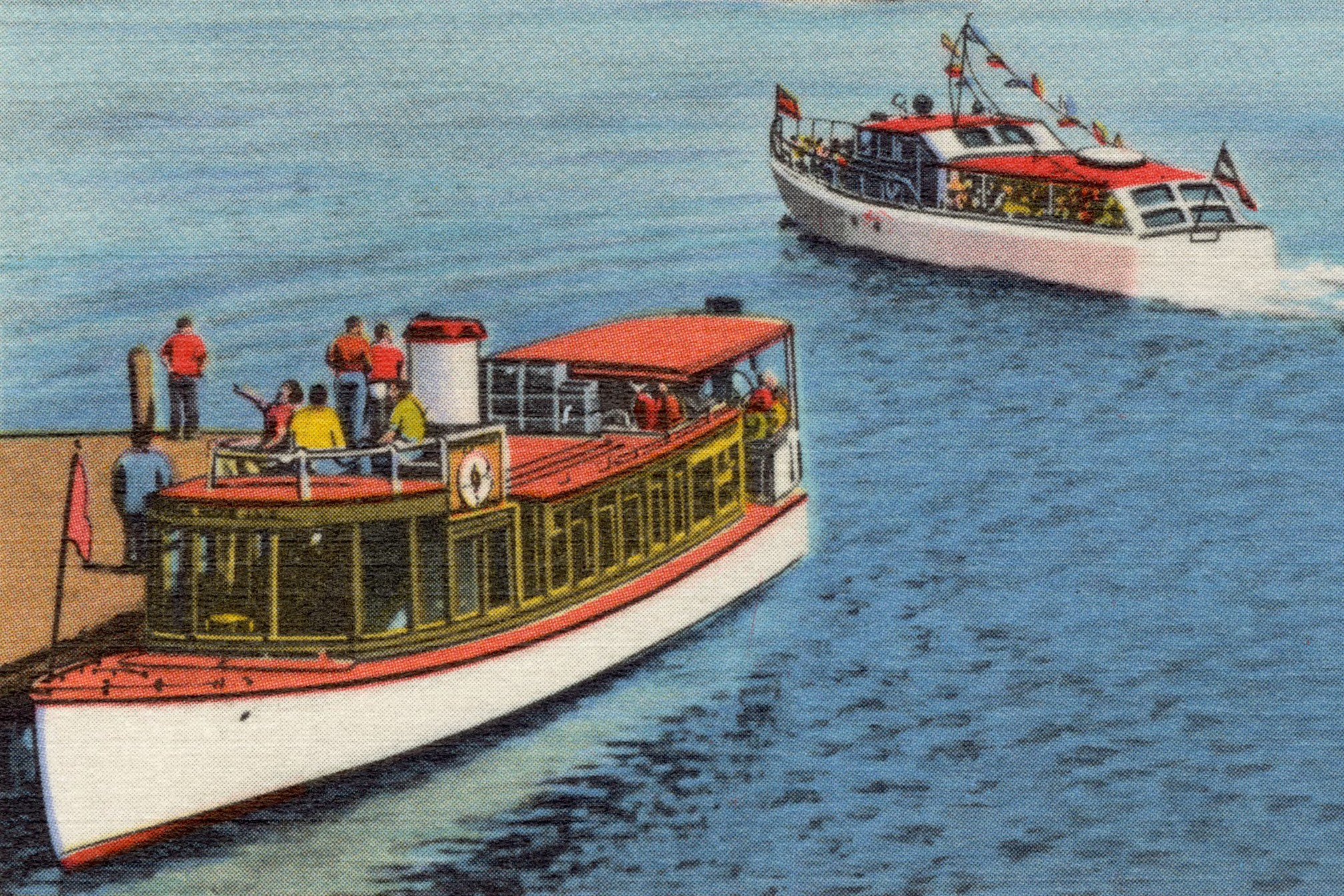
The Sophie C. and the Uncle Sam II, as they appeared on a 1945 postcard

The M/V Sophie C. is the oldest, and one of only two currently operating, floating United States Postal Service post offices. Floating post office service was started on Lake Winnipesaukee in 1892, and currently delivers mail daily to eight of the lake's islands between June and September. The Sophie C. was built by Boston General Ship & Engine Works in 1945 to temporarily replace the Mount Washington, whose engines and boilers had been commandeered by the Navy during World War II, and she took over the mail route from the Uncle Sam II in 1969.

As a floating post office, Sophie C. delivers mail Monday-Saturday, sells postage, and collects and postmarks outgoing mail. Sophie C. also operates as a sightseeing boat, carrying up to 125 people on her two cruises a day as she delivers mail, and sells ice cream and snacks to residents of the islands she serves. In 2018 and 2019, the M/V Doris E. replaced the Sophie C. as mail boat while the latter was undergoing repairs.

=== Steamship Dover ===
The steamship Dover, 150 feet (46 m) in length, captained by Winborn Sanborn, operated by the Cocheco Railroad, traveled the lake in the 1850s. The Dover was lengthened to 162 feet (49 m) and renamed the Chocorua and sank in the late 1860s. She was refloated, but by the 1870s the new Mount Washington had replaced her.

=== Belle of the Wave ===
The Belle of the Wave was a propeller-driven steamer. Construction commenced in the Winter of 1881–1882 and launched in 1882 at Long Island, Lake Winnipesaukee, by Captain Herbert Adolph Blackstone (1858–1949) for Captain Arthur Horace Lamprey (1841–1905). One of the first Blackstone-built steamers on the lake, she had a hull measuring 72 feet (21.9 m) in length made of dry white oak from the Lamprey Farm with a 12-foot (3.7 m) beam. She was powered by a 40-horsepower Payne steam engine (manufactured by Fitz-Henry and Payne) – the steam being generated by a tubular boiler. With a capacity of 125 passengers, she was designed for speed. She was operated by the Boston & Maine Railroad and sailed between Lakeport and Long Island, connecting with the steamer Mount Washington. On the night of November 18, 1884, she was completely destroyed by fire while moored at Long Island Landing (on the back side of Long Island). Her machinery was subsequently salvaged and installed in the Cyclone, built in 1887.

== Seaplane base ==
The Alton Bay Seaplane Base is a state-owned, public-use seaplane base in Alton Bay, the southeast arm of the lake. In the winter it is the only FAA-approved ice runway in the contiguous United States, conditions permitting.

== Weather and climate ==
Average summertime on or next to the water brings days around 80 °F (26 °C), with overnight lows around 65 °F (18 °C). Less than one-half mile (800 m) away from the water, days can be warmer and nights cooler by several degrees. Summer's most extreme temperatures away from the water may be as high as 100 °F (38 °C) and as low as 50 °F (10 °C). A typical winter day brings a maximum of 28 °F (−2 °C) with overnight minimum around 15 °F (−9 °C). Typical wintertime extremes are 50 °F (10 °C) and −20 °F (−30 °C) but even greater extremes have been recorded nearby.

The water temperature typically reaches the upper 70s F (around 25 °C) in late July and cools into the 60s (around 18 °C) in September. Several days of hot, humid weather at the height of summer can bring the water temperature well above 80 °F (26 °C). It normally freezes during the last week of December. Ice thickness during a typical winter can be in excess of 18 inches (460 mm) in many parts of the lake.

== Ice-In and Ice-Out ==
Lake Winnipesaukee is known for its annual Ice-Out Contest, in which people try to guess the earliest date that the Mount Washington can safely leave her port in Center Harbor and motor to four other ports (Weirs Beach, Alton Bay, Wolfeboro, and Meredith). Since records began in 1851, ice-out has happened as early as March 17, in 2024 and as late as May 12, although 90 percent of the time it is declared during April. This official ruling is made by David Emerson of Emerson Aviation.

== In popular culture ==
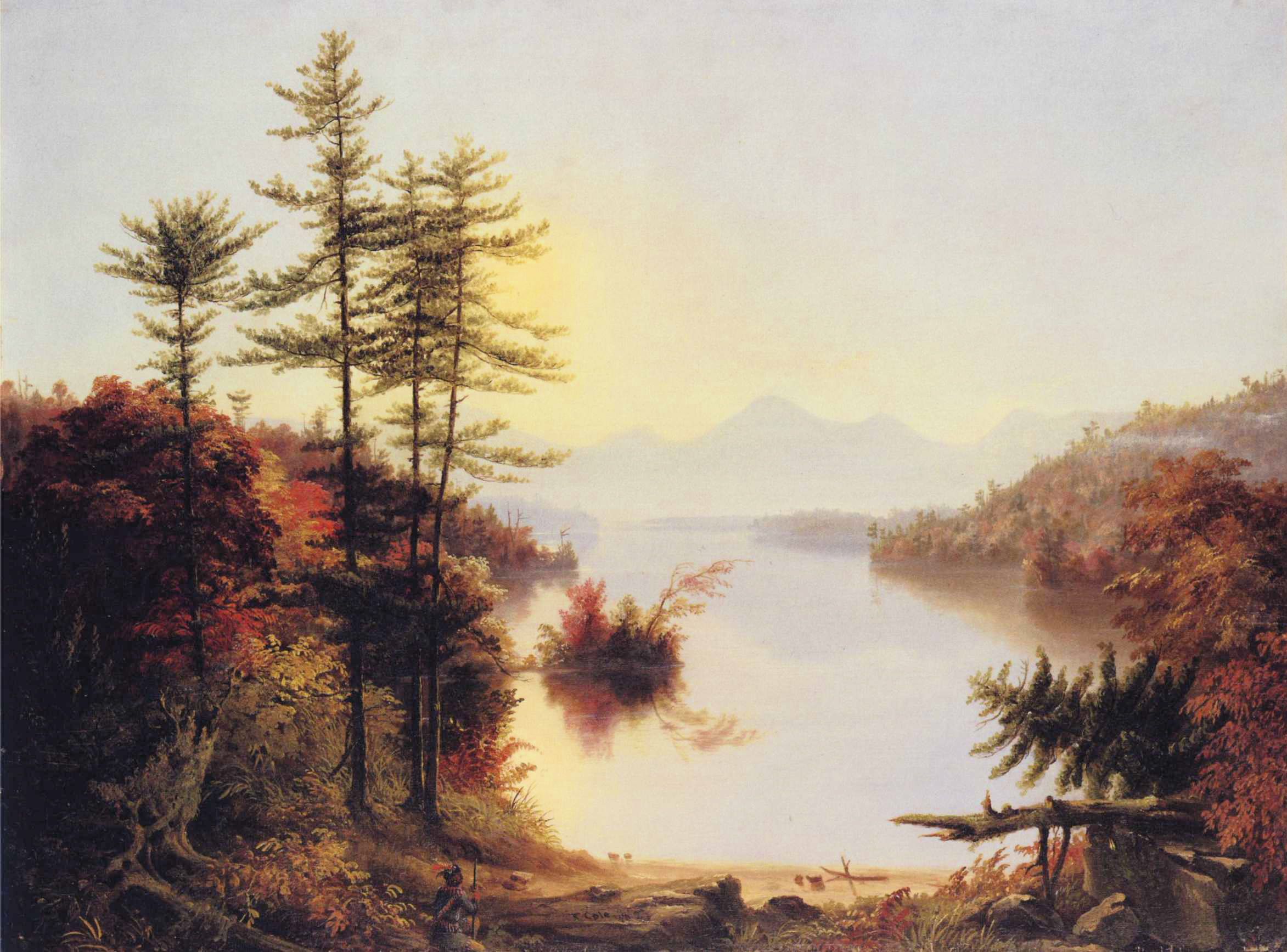
View on Lake Winnipiseogee (1828) by American painter Thomas Cole

- Thornton Wilder's 1938 Pulitzer Prize–winning play Our Town refers to Lake Winnipesaukee at the beginning of Act III.
- In a 1940 Three Stooges short, No Census, No Feeling, the Stooges are census takers, and Curly answers a query about his birthplace with "Lake Winnipesaukee". When Moe asks him to spell it, he switches course and says, "Make it Lake Erie – I've got an uncle there."
- Some boating scenes from the 1981 Academy Award–winning film On Golden Pond were shot on the lake, though the main scenes were on nearby Squam Lake.
- In 1982, composer Alan Hovhaness, who spent much of his childhood in New Hampshire, composed Lake Winnipesaukee, Op. 363, a sextet for flute, oboe, cello, two percussion, and piano.
- The 1991 comedy movie What About Bob? is set at Lake Winnipesaukee, although the actual filming was done at Smith Mountain Lake in Virginia.
- The 2006 comedy Click has a flashback depicting Adam Sandler as a kid playing on a beach on Lake Winnipesaukee.
- In the debut of Adam Sandler's "Thanksgiving Song", on Saturday Night Live (November 21, 1992), the long-time New Hampshire resident sings, "I used to go to camp at Lake Winnipesaukee".
- On The Tonight Show Starring Jimmy Fallon, host Jimmy Fallon and frequent guest Justin Timberlake have filmed a series of sketches set at a fictional "Camp Winnipesaukee".
- In Nemesis Games, the fifth book in The Expanse novel series, Rattlesnake Island is the site of a private spaceship launchpad for the wealthy. It was then featured in the fifth season of the TV series of the same name in the ninth episode, titled "Winnipesaukee".
- In Spymaster, part of Brad Thor's Scot Harvath series of books, the character Reed Carlton is cared for in a house on Governors Island on Lake Winnipesaukee.
- Irish acoustic folk rock band Hermitage Green wrote a song about the lake, entitled "Lake Winnipesaukee".
- Mentioned as the destination of a fishing trip Archie wanted to take in Season 8 Episode 6 of All in the Family, "Unequal Partners".
- Mentioned on a TV newsreel the cast is watching in the bar at the beginning of Cheers Season 5, Episode 4, "Abnormal Psychology"

== See also ==
- Lake Winnipesaukee mystery stone
- List of lakes in New Hampshire

== Bibliography ==
=== References ===
- "Bathymetry Depth Maps of New Hampshire". Concord: New Hampshire Fish and Game Department. (See Bathymetry).
1. "Lake Winnipesaukee".
  1. p. 1 — Public Water Access Map — showing boat ramps, public landings, roads, and other geographic features (undated).
  2. p. 2 — "Depth Contour Chart" — the historical bathymetric chart showing underwater depths and contours. February 1966.
- "Bizer's List of Islands of Lake Winnipesaukee". Weston, Massachusetts: Bizer Corporation, Colin and Theresa Woodworth. August 19, 2017.
- Blackstone, Edward H. (1969). "Farewell Old Mount Washington – The Story of the Steamboat Era on Lake Winnipesaukee". Staten Island: Steamship Historical Society of America. OCLC 73103 (all editions)
- Blaisdell, Paul H[enry] (1908–1983) (1936). "Three Centuries on Winnipesaukee". Concord, New Hampshire: Rumford Press.
1. Re: "Belle of the Wave". pp. 34–35, 39, 42, 44 – via Internet Archive.
2. Re: "Mount Washington". pp. 20, 33–35, 37, 42–46, 52, 57–58, 61–65 – via Internet Archive.
- Boating on the Lakes. Wolfeboro Falls, Lake Winnipesaukee: Smiley Publishing Group, LLC.
1. Caldwell-Hopper, Kathi (2020). "Steadfast Steamers of Days Gone By" (2020 ed.). pp. 42–45 – via Issuu.
- Concord Monitor. Concord, New Hampshire. LCCN sn84-20472 (print ed.), LCWA lcwaN0011371 (online ed.); OCLC 10828908 (all editions)
1. Masin-Moyer, Lucas (August 3, 2017). "Special Delivery" (p. 1A) – "Sophie C. Delivers Mail, Smiles to Islands on Lake Winnipesaukee (p. 5A)" – "Mail Boat on Winnipesaukee Brings Island Residents Together" (blog ed.).
  1. "Via Concord Monitor blog".
  2. Via Newspapers.com (print ed.). pp. 1 & 5 (section A).
2. Brooks, David. "Lakes Region" – "Ice Out Declared on Big Lake – Winter Lasted Just 37 Days on Lake Winnipesaukee".
  1. Via Granit Geek (blog ed.). March 18, 2024.
  2. Via Newspapers.com (print ed.). March 19, 2024. pp. 1 & 3 (section A).
Granite Geek is a weekly popular science and technology column, blog, and newsletter by New Hampshire journalist David Brooks, published by the Concord Monitor. Brooks began writing the column in 1991 for The Telegraph of Nashua and launched its companion blog, Granite Geek, in 2006. Both moved to the Concord Monitor when Brooks joined the newspaper in 2015. As of 2026, its website is www.concordmonitor.com/granite-geek/, previously granitegeek.concordmonitor.com.
- E! Entertainment Television; Schnurr, Samantha (October 27, 2016). "Justin Timberlake and Jimmy Fallon Return to Camp Winnipesaukee to Wreak Musical Havoc".
- Heald, Bruce D. (1 May 1998) [1997]. Boats and Ports of Lake Winnipesaukee (2 Vols.). Arcadia Publishing. LCCN 2003-106998; ISBN 978-0-7524-0870-5, 0-7524-0870-4 (Vol. 1); ISBN 978-0-7385-1266-2, 0-7385-1266-4 (Vol. 1); ISBN 978-1-4396-2199-8, 1-4396-2199-3 (Vol. 2); OCLC 967391891 (all editions).
1. Vol. 1 – via Internet Archive.
2. Vol. 2: Chapter 2 – "Steamboats Past" (limited preview) – via Google Books.
3. Vol. 2: Chapter 2 – "Steamboats Past" (limited preview) – via Google Books.
4. Vol. 2: Chapter 2 – "Steamboats Past" (limited preview) – via Google Books.
- Hurd, D[uane] Hamilton (1850–1924) [at Wikidata], ed. (1885). History of Merrimack and Belknap Counties, New Hampshire. Philadelphia: J.W. Lewis & Co. – via Wikimedia Commons.
1. Chapter 4: "Laconia (continued)" "Lake Winnipesaukee" – "Steamboat Navigation". p. 819.
  1. Via Ancestry.com.
  2. Via Internet Archive (Boston College).
- Laconia Daily Sun (The). Laconia, New Hampshire. LCWA lcwaN0045509; OCLC 60033693 (all editions).
1. Amsden, Roger (May 27, 2017). "Byron Hedblom's Extraordinary Life".
- McKenna, Robert (2003). The Dictionary of Nautical Literacy. International Marine, a division of McGraw-Hill Professional Reference. p. 157. LCCN 2001-1471; ISBN 978-0-0713-6211-5, 0-0713-6211-8; ISBN 978-0-0714-1950-5, 0-0714-1950-0 (2003 ed); OCLC 46449032 (all editions).
1. Entry: "Harvard vs. Yale".
- Mount Washington Cruises (website).
1. U/S Mail Boat, Sophie C. on Lake Winnipesaukee, NH.
2. Morash, Jim (31 July 2018). "Nearing the Halfway Point".
3. "Mailboat Cruises".
- New England Boating; Richardson, Tom (March 31, 2011). "Bill Raises Winnipesaukee 'Broads' Speed Limit". Archived from the original on April 24, 2014.
- New Hampshire Public Radio; Carbone, Ray (July 19, 2019). "Winnipesaukee’s Mail Boat Is Part Floating Post Office, Part Time Machine" (blog).
- Seacoast Online; Ramer, Holly (September 12, 2011). "Anne Nix Makes N.H.'s Floating Postal Office Run". Seacoast Media Group. Archived from the original on November 11, 2019.
- St. Albans Messenger (October 23, 2021). Whatever Happened to the Steamship Chateauguay? Its Second Life Might Surprise You. Courtesy of Saint Albans Museum. LCCN sn93-63663; OCLC 11932116 (all editions).
- Wilkin, Elizabeth Crawford (1949). Winnipesaukee Whoppers: Fabulous Legends of the Lake Once Called Winnipiseogee (68 pgs.). Melvin Village, New Hampshire: Pine Point Press. Re-Printed 1960 by Wake-Brook House, Sanbornville, New Hampshire. OCLC 6285943 (all editions).
