= Dan Hole River =

- Location within New Hampshire Location within the United States

Location
- Country: United States
- State: New Hampshire
- County: Carroll
- Town: Ossipee

Physical characteristics
- Source: Dan Hole Pond
  - location: Ossipee
  - coordinates: 43°43′57″N 71°12′35″W
  - elevation: 827 ft (252 m)
- Mouth: Beech River
  - location: Center Ossipee
  - coordinates: 43°44′51″N 71°8′53″W
  - elevation: 450 ft (140 m)
- Length: 5.1 mi (8.2 km)

Basin features
- Tributaries
  - left: Gile Brook

The Dan Hole River is a 5.1-mile-long (8.2 km) river in the town of Ossipee in eastern New Hampshire in the United States. Its waters flow via the Beech River, Pine River, Ossipee Lake, the Ossipee River, and the Saco River to the Gulf of Maine, an arm of the Atlantic Ocean.

The Dan Hole River begins at the outlet of Dan Hole Pond on the southern edge of the Ossipee Mountains. The river promptly enters Little Dan Hole Pond, then exits from the pond's northern end. The river flows east, past Moultonville, reaching the Beech River just south of the village of Center Ossipee.

== See also ==
- List of rivers of New Hampshire
