= Dan Hole Pond =

Lake in Carroll County, New Hampshire

- Location within New Hampshire Location within the United States
- Location: Carroll County, New Hampshire
- Coordinates: 43°43′30″N 71°13′24″W
- Primary inflows: Bodge Brook
- Primary outflows: Dan Hole River
- Basin countries: United States
- Max. length: 1.6 mi (2.6 km)
- Max. width: 0.6 mi (1.0 km)
- Surface area: 443 acres (1.8 km^{2})
- Average depth: 57 ft (17 m)
- Max. depth: 130 ft (40 m)
- Surface elevation: 827 ft (252 m)
- Settlements: Ossipee; Tuftonboro

Dan Hole Pond is a 443-acre (1.8 km^{2}) water body located in Carroll County in eastern New Hampshire, United States, in the towns of Ossipee and Tuftonboro. The pond is situated on the south side of the Ossipee Mountains. Water exits Dan Hole Pond via the Dan Hole River, part of the Ossipee Lake watershed and ultimately that of the Saco River in Maine.

Dan Hole Pond has a maximum depth of 130 feet (40 m), but averages closer to 50 feet (15 m). The altitude of the pond is 827 feet (252 m) above sea level. The lake is classified as a coldwater fishery, with observed species including landlocked salmon, brook trout, lake trout, chain pickerel, and horned pout.

== See also ==
- List of lakes in New Hampshire
