= Beech River (New Hampshire) =

- Location within New Hampshire Location within the United States

Location
- Country: United States
- State: New Hampshire
- Counties: Carroll
- Towns: Wolfeboro, Tuftonboro, Ossipee

Physical characteristics
- Source: Upper Beech Pond
  - location: Wolfeboro
  - coordinates: 43°39′11″N 71°12′10″W
  - elevation: 983 ft (300 m)
- Mouth: Pine River
  - location: Ossipee
  - coordinates: 43°45′26″N 71°7′41″W
  - elevation: 410 ft (120 m)
- Length: 13.1 mi (21.1 km)

Basin features
- Tributaries
  - left: Dan Hole River

The Beech River is a 13.1-mile-long (21.1 km) river located in eastern New Hampshire in the United States. It is a tributary of the Pine River, part of the Ossipee Lake / Saco River watershed leading to the Atlantic Ocean.

The Beech River begins at the outlet of Upper Beech Pond in the northern part of Wolfeboro, New Hampshire. The river flows north for one mile and enters Lower Beech Pond in the town of Tuftonboro. Resuming its course, it heads generally northeast into Ossipee, passing through Garland Pond and reaching the Pine River near the village of Center Ossipee.

== See also ==
- List of rivers of New Hampshire
