= Pine River Pond =

Lake in Carroll County, New Hampshire, US

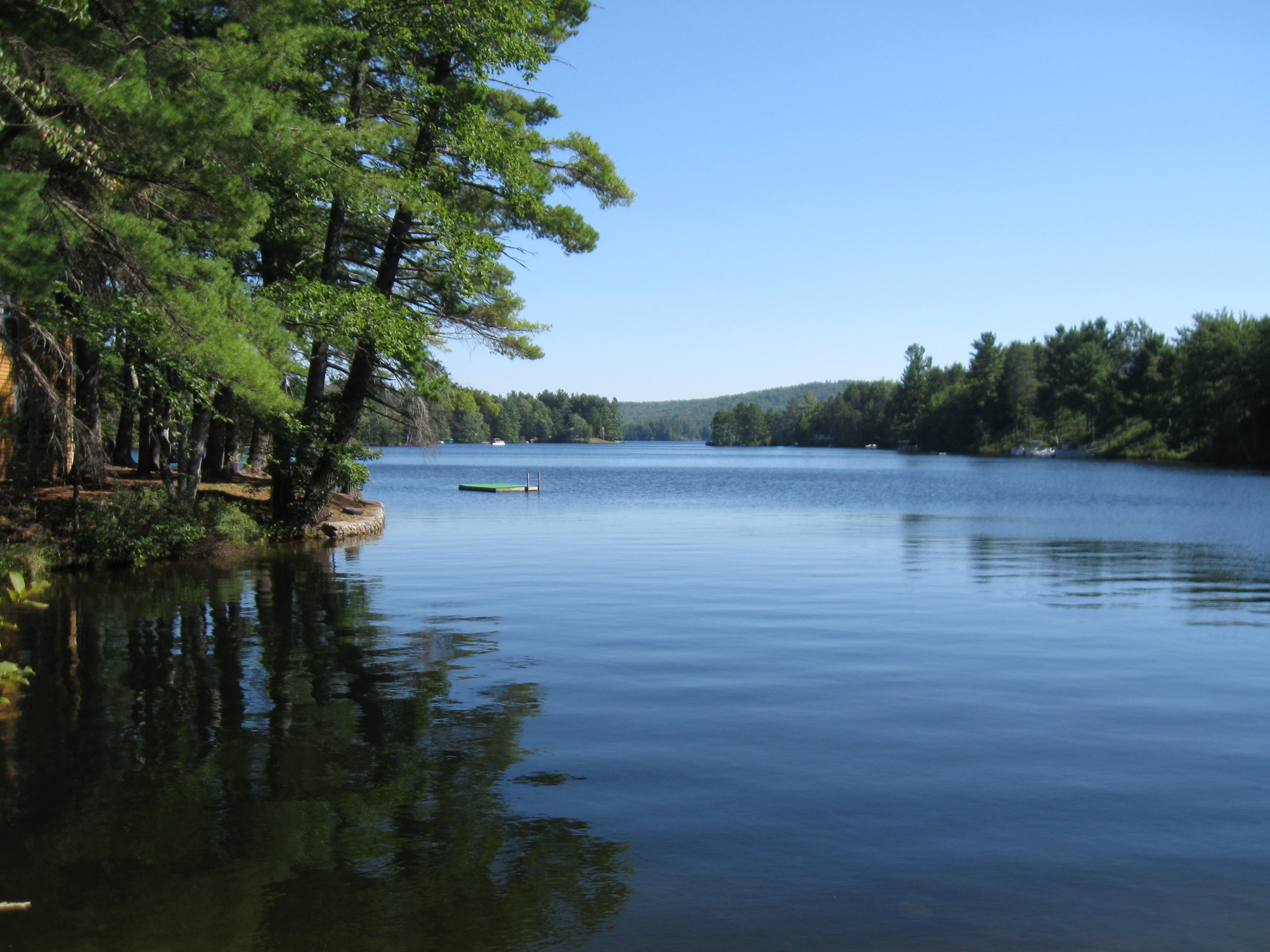

- Location within New Hampshire
- Location: Carroll County, New Hampshire
- Coordinates: 43°37′34″N 71°1′21″W
- Primary outflows: Pine River
- Basin countries: United States
- Max. length: 3.6 mi (5.8 km)
- Max. width: 0.6 mi (0.97 km)
- Surface area: 570 acres (2.3 km^{2})
- Average depth: 10 ft (3.0 m)
- Max. depth: 55 ft (17 m)
- Surface elevation: 584 ft (178 m)
- Islands: 15
- Settlements: Wakefield

Pine River Pond is a 570-acre (2.3 km^{2}) lake located in Carroll County in eastern New Hampshire, United States, in the town of Wakefield. Its outlet is the Pine River, which flows northwest to Ossipee Lake.

The lake is classified as a warmwater fishery, with observed species including smallmouth and largemouth bass, chain pickerel, horned pout, black crappie, yellow perch, white perch and pumpkinseed.

Many homes on the lake were built in the late 1950s. The majority of the residents on the lake either live there year-round, or they live in states such as Massachusetts, Maine, or Connecticut and they just live there during the summer months.

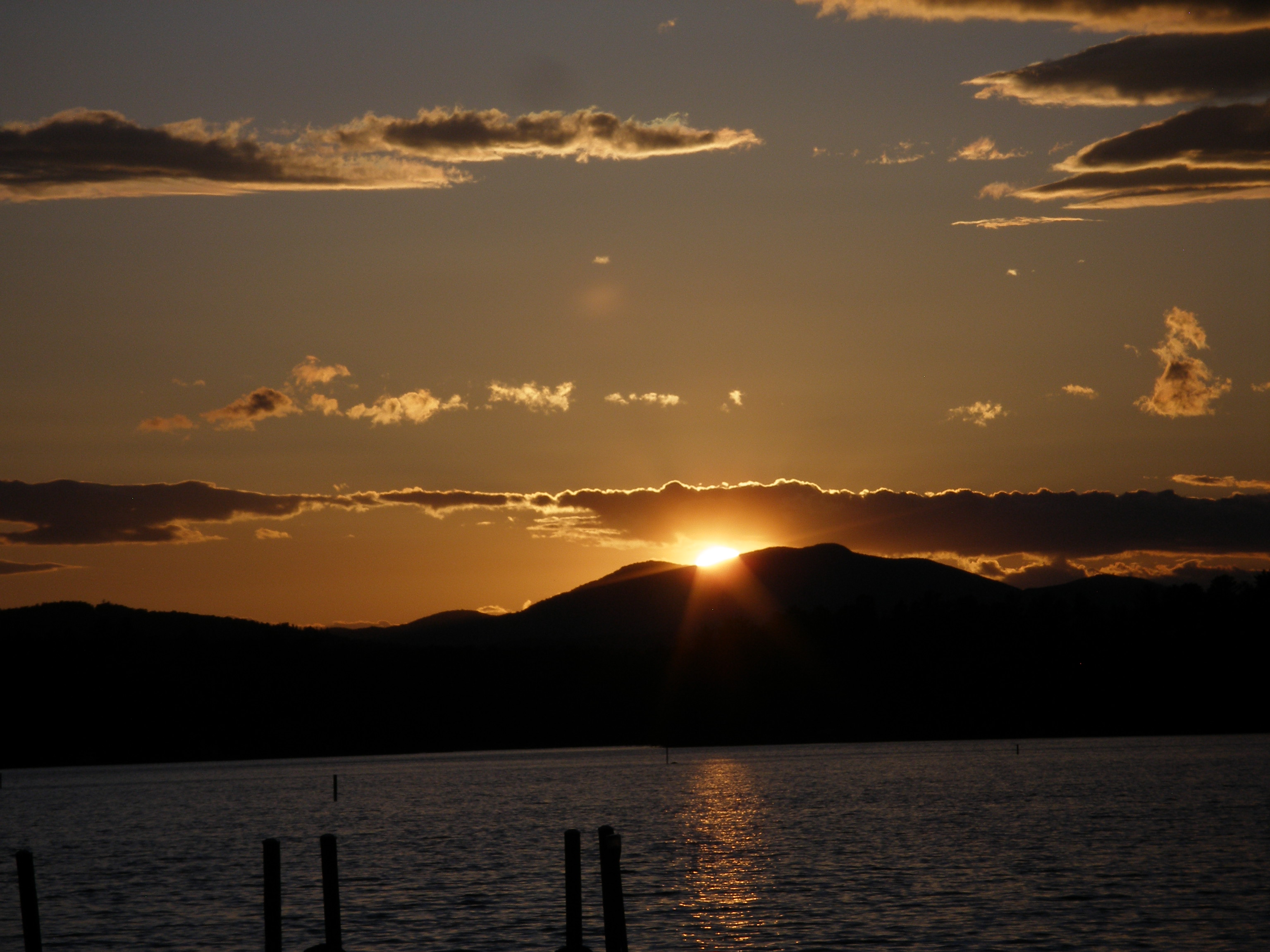
Sunset from a dock at Pine River Pond

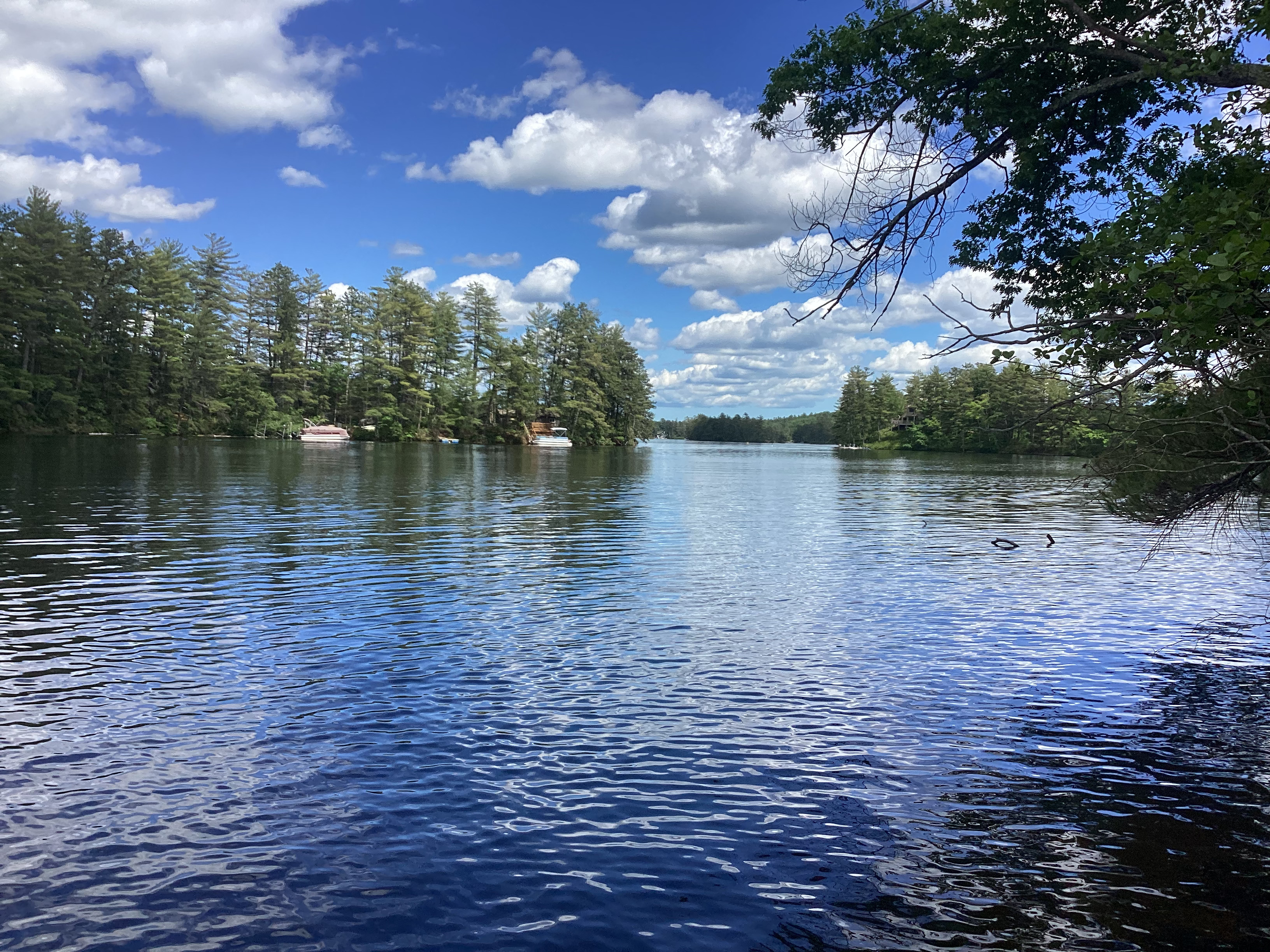
Peaceful day on Pine River Pond

== See also ==
- List of lakes in New Hampshire
