= Pine River (New Hampshire) =

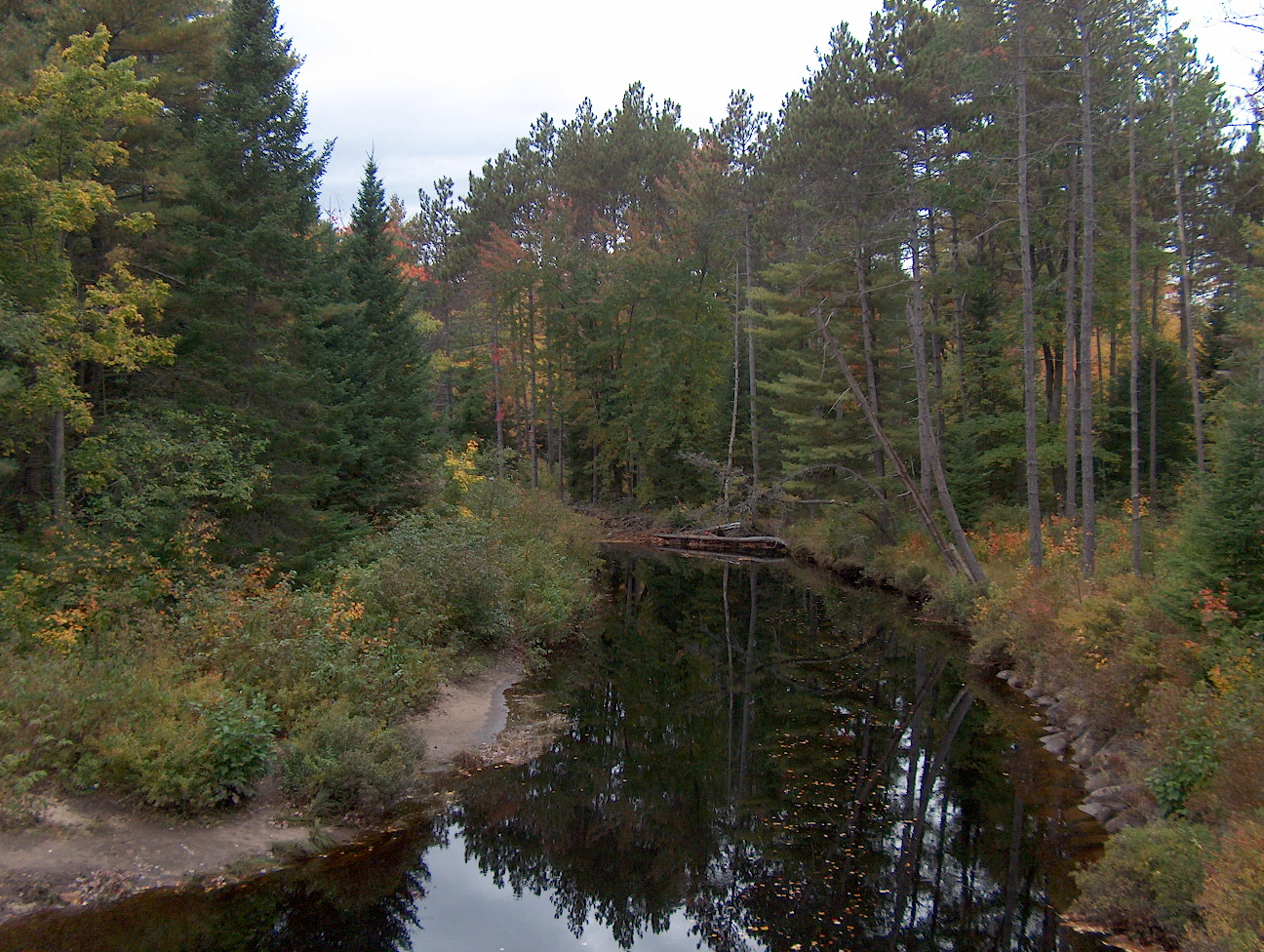
- The Pine River in Effingham, New Hampshire

- Location within New Hampshire Location within the United States

Location
- Country: United States
- State: New Hampshire
- County: Carroll
- Towns: Wakefield, Ossipee, Effingham

Physical characteristics
- Source: Pine River Pond
  - location: Wakefield
  - coordinates: 43°38′46″N 71°2′47″W
  - elevation: 584 ft (178 m)
- Mouth: Ossipee Lake
  - location: Ossipee
  - coordinates: 44°46′19″N 71°8′21″W
  - elevation: 407 ft (124 m)
- Length: 19.2 mi (30.9 km)

Basin features
- Tributaries
  - left: Youngs Brook, Poland Brook, Frenchman Brook, Peavey Brook, Beech River
  - right: Pike Brook, Wilkinson Brook

The Pine River is a 19.2-mile-long (30.9 km) river located in eastern New Hampshire in the United States. It is a tributary of Ossipee Lake, part of the Saco River watershed leading to the Atlantic Ocean.

== Course ==
The Pine River begins at the outlet of Pine River Pond in Wakefield, New Hampshire. The river almost immediately enters the town of Ossipee and heads northwest through a sandy, pine-forested valley. The Pine River Esker, now mostly excavated by sand and gravel operations, follows the river for over 6 miles (10 km). The river enters the western corner of Effingham, passing through the Heath Pond Bog Natural Area, then reenters Ossipee 2 miles (3 km) before the river's mouth at Ossipee Lake.

The Beech River is a significant tributary, entering just east of the village of Center Ossipee, one mile upstream from Ossipee Lake. New Hampshire Route 16, while not following the river closely, occupies the same broad, sandy valley.

== See also ==
- List of rivers of New Hampshire
