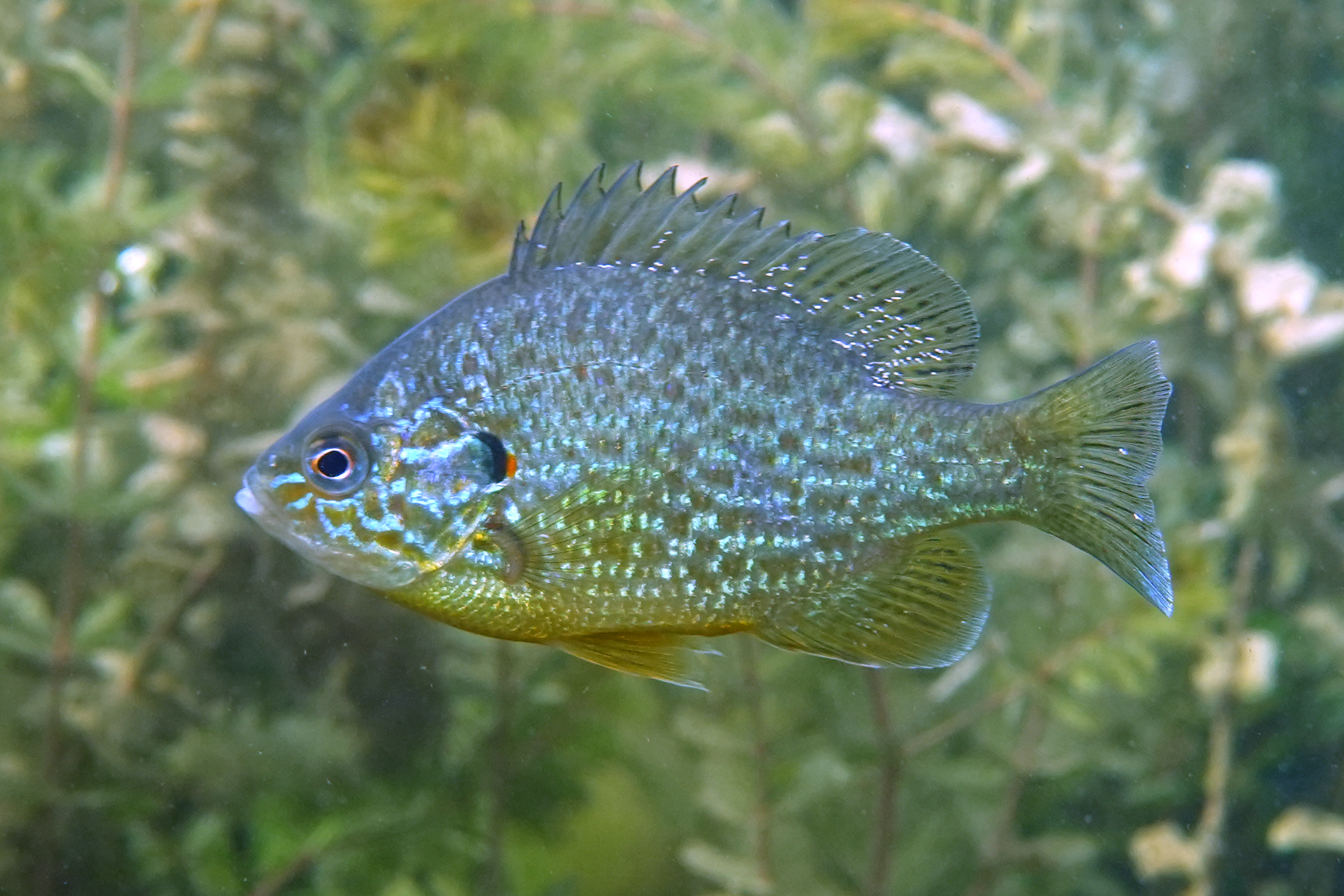

Conservation status
- Least Concern (IUCN 3.1)

- Secure (NatureServe)

Scientific classification
- Kingdom: Animalia
- Phylum: Chordata
- Class: Actinopterygii
- Division: Teleostei
- Order: Centrarchiformes
- Family: Centrarchidae
- Genus: Lepomis
- Species: L. gibbosus

Binomial name
- Lepomis gibbosus (Linnaeus, 1758)

Synonyms
- Perca gibbosa Linnaeus, 1758; Eupomotis gibbosus (Linnaeus, 1758); Lepomus gibbosus (Linnaeus, 1758); Pomotis vulgaris Cuvier, 1829

= Pumpkinseed =

Species of fish

The pumpkinseed (Lepomis gibbosus), also referred to as sun perch, pond perch, common sunfish, punkie, sunfish, sunny, and kivver, is a small to medium–sized freshwater fish of the genus Lepomis (true sunfishes), from the sunfish family (Centrarchidae) in the order Centrarchiformes. It is endemic to eastern North America.

== Etymology ==
Lepomis, in Greek, means 'scaled gill cover', and gibbosus means 'humped'. The defining characteristic of a pumpkinseed sunfish is the bright red spot at the tip of the ear flap. The pumpkinseed sunfish is widely recognized by its shape of a pumpkin seed, from which its common name comes. See also Wiktionary link below.

== Distribution ==
The pumpkinseed's native range in North America is from north to New Brunswick, Canada, down the east coast of the United States south to South Carolina, and extending inland to the middle of North America from Pennsylvania to Iowa, depending on various river systems. It has, however, been introduced throughout most of North America, and can now be found from Washington and Oregon on the Pacific Coast to Georgia further south on the Atlantic Coast. They are primarily found in the northeastern United States and more rarely in the south-central or southwestern region of the continent.

=== Introduced range ===
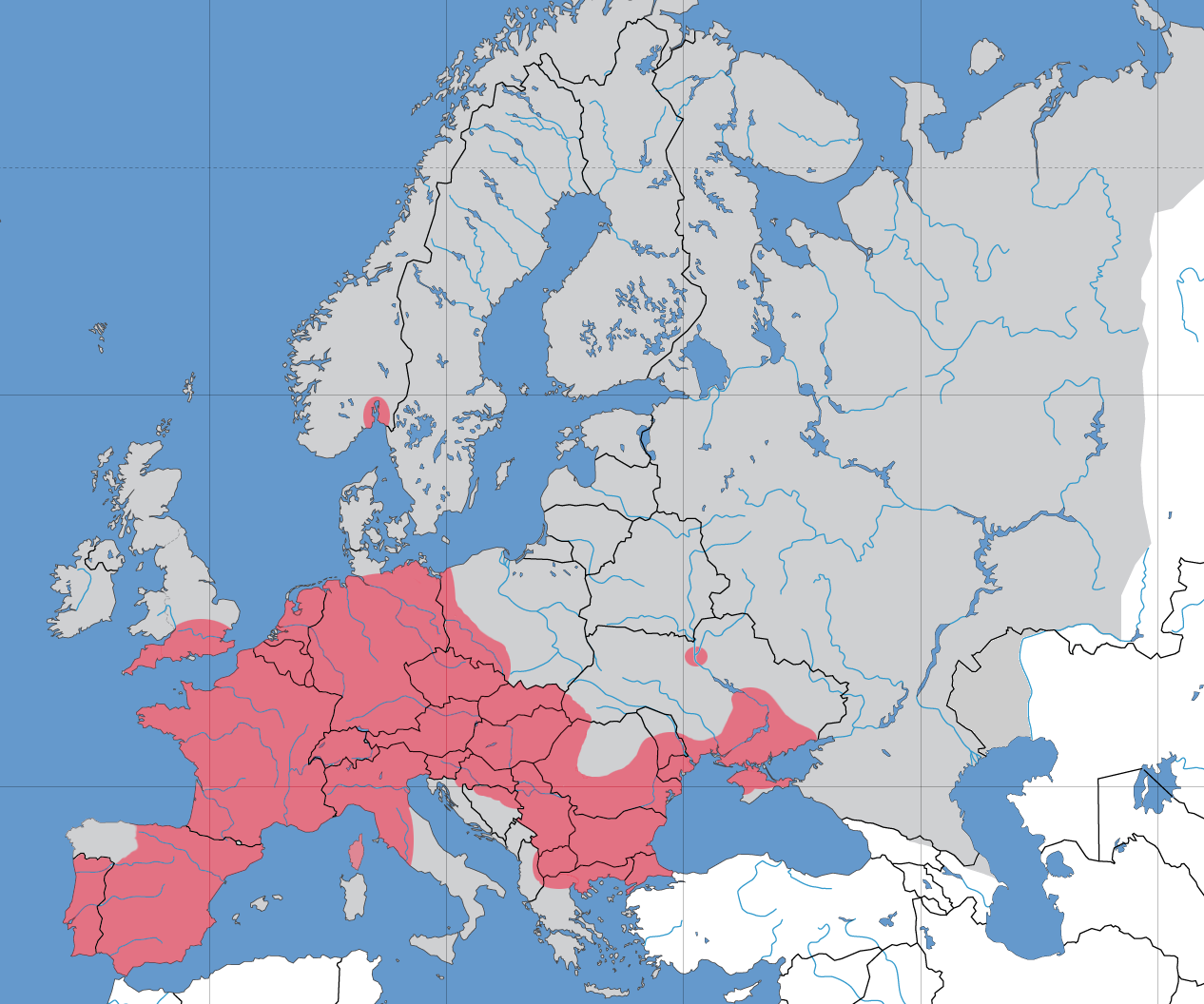
Invasive range in Europe (red)

In Europe, the pumpkinseed is considered an invasive species. Since introduced to European waters, it could outcompete native fish, and the species is included since 2019 in the concern list of Invasive Alien Species of Union (the Union list). It cannot be imported, bred, transported, commercialized, or intentionally released into the environment in the whole of the European Union.

The pumpkinseed has also been introduced to the United Kingdom, having arrived in the country around the same time as the populations in Continental Europe. Its range is believed to be restricted to Southern England and the West Country, with stable populations found in East Sussex, West Sussex and Somerset, though the species may potentially be present in the vicinity of London as well.

== Description ==
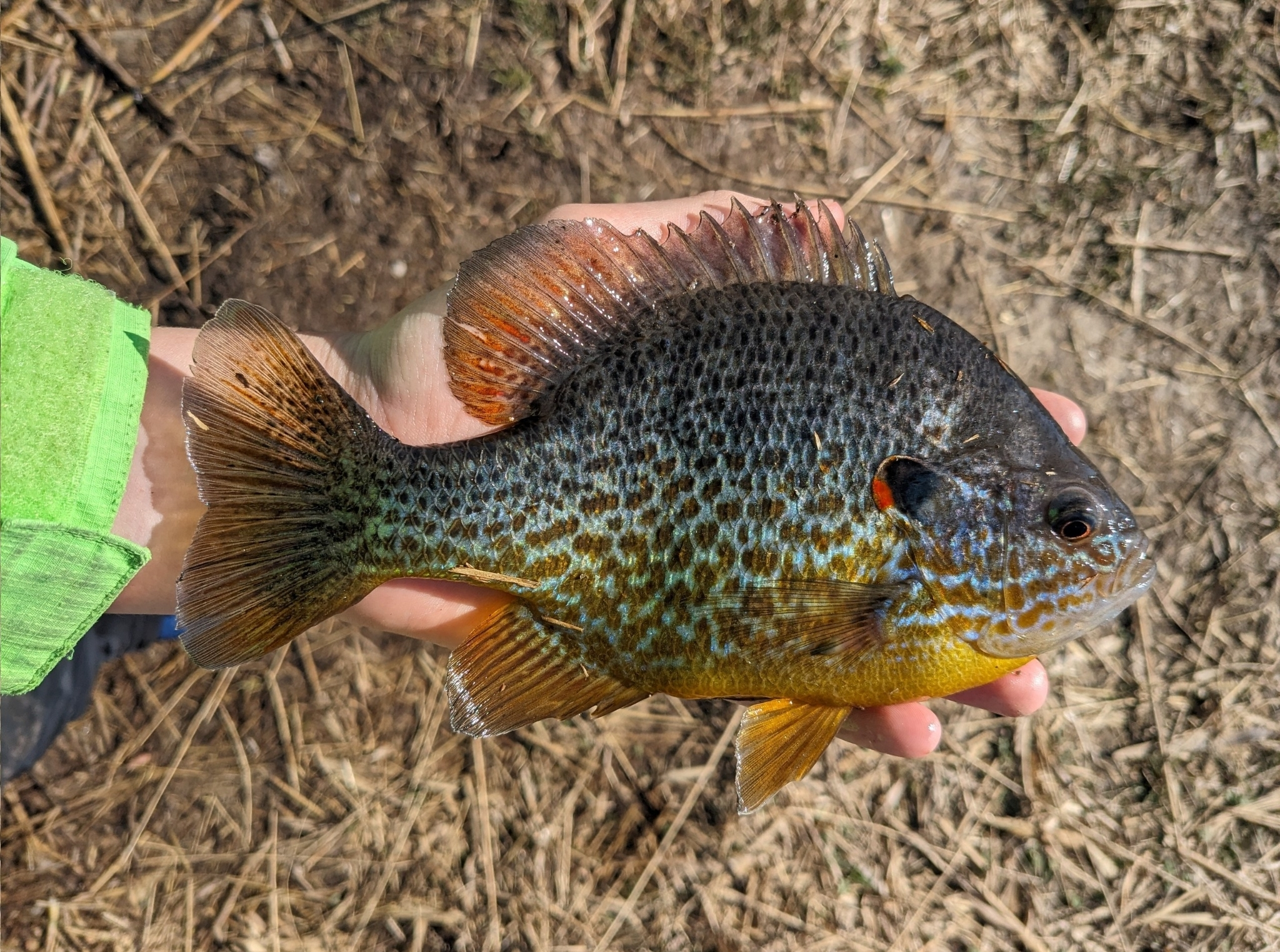
In Michigan

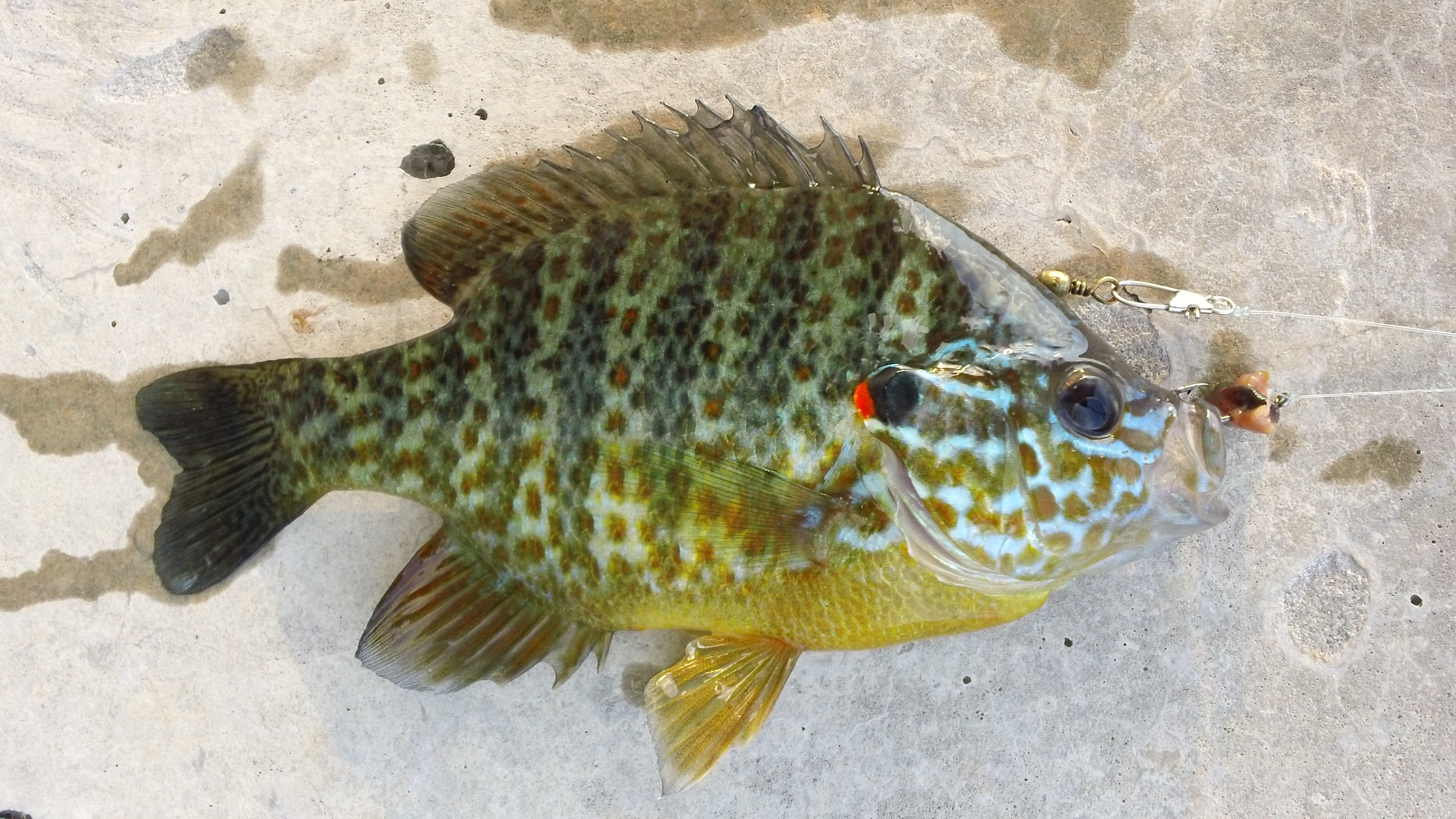
Pumpkinseed caught in Lake St. Clair

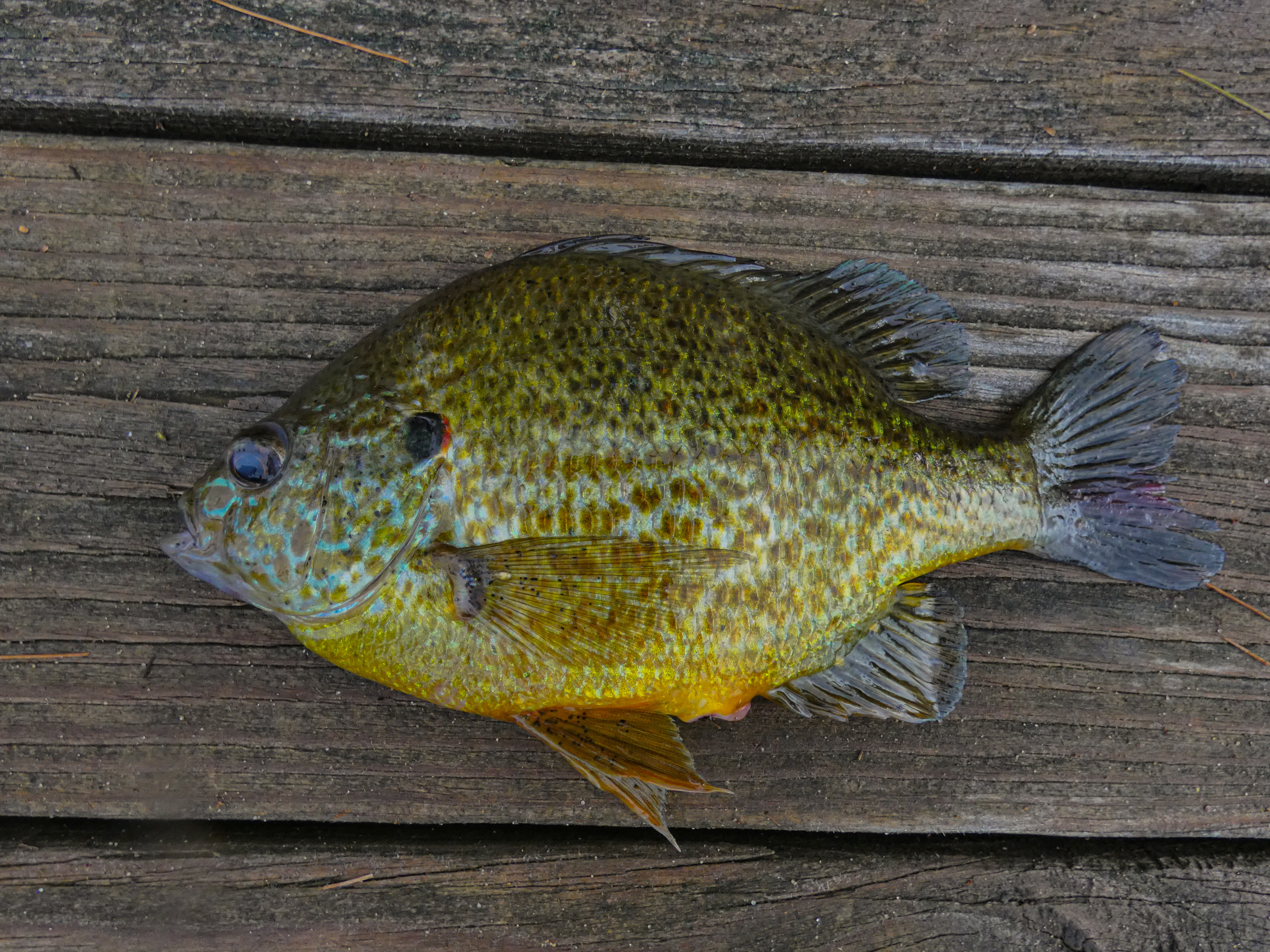
Pumpkinseed caught on Pine River Pond

Pumpkinseeds have a body shaped much like a pumpkin seed (thus the common name), typically about 10 cm (4 in) but up to 28 cm (11 in) in length. They typically weigh less than 1 pound (450 g), with the world record being 1 pound 8 ounces (680 g), caught at Honeoye Lake in Upstate New York in 2016. The pumpkinseed is vibrantly colored and may be orange, green, yellow or blue, with speckles over their sides and back and a yellow-orange breast and belly. The sides are covered with vertical bars that are a faint green or blue, which are typically more prevalent in female pumpkinseeds. Orange spots may cover the dorsal, anal, and caudal fins, and the cheeks have blue lines across them. The pumpkinseed is noted for the orange-red spot on the margin of its black gill cover. The pectoral fins can be amber or clear, while the dorsal spines are black. They have a small mouth with an upper jaw stopping right under the eye.

Pumpkinseeds are very similar to the larger bluegill, and are often found in the same habitats. One difference between the two species is their opercular flap, which is black in both species, but the pumpkinseed has a crimson spot in the shape of a half moon on the back portion. Pumpkinseeds have seven or eight vertical, irregular bands on their sides that are duller in color compared to the bluegill.

== Ecology ==
=== Habitat ===
Pumpkinseeds typically live in warm, calm lakes, ponds, and pools of creeks and small rivers with plenty of vegetation. They prefer clear water where they can find shelter to hide. They tend to stay near the shore, and can be found in numbers within shallow and protected areas. They will feed at all water levels from the surface to the bottom in the daylight, and their heaviest feeding will be in the afternoon. Pumpkinseed sunfish usually travel together in schools that can also include bluegills and other sunfish.

Pumpkinseeds are more tolerant of low oxygen levels than bluegills are, but less tolerant of warm water. Groups of young fish school close to shore, but adults tend to travel in groups of two to four in slightly deeper yet still covered waters. Pumpkinseeds are active throughout the day, but they rest at night near the bottom or in shelter areas in rocks or near submerged logs.

=== Reproduction and life cycle ===
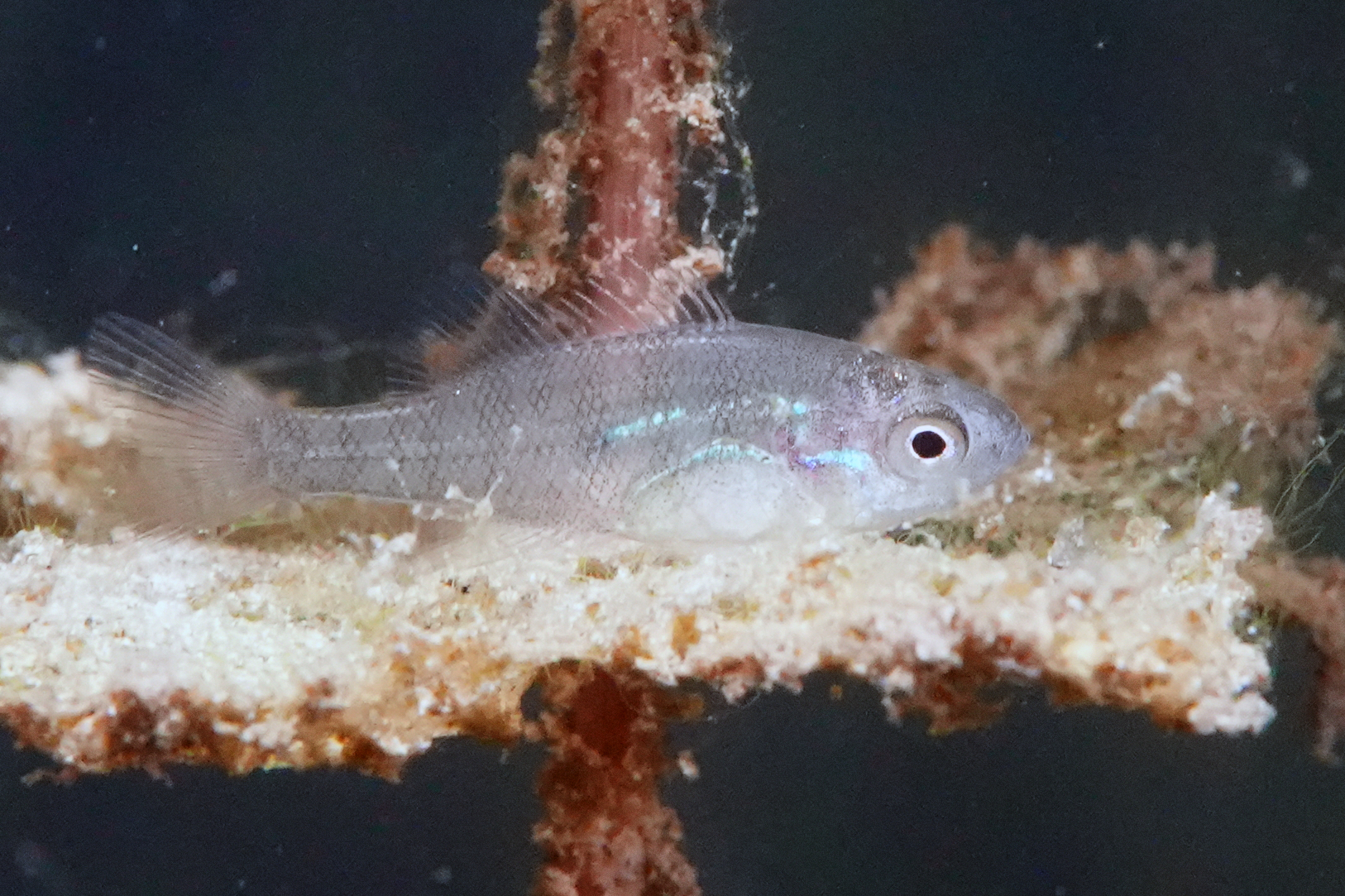
Especially juvenile pumpkinseeds have a stripe pattern.

Once water temperatures reach 55–63 °F (13–17 °C) in the late spring or early summer, the male pumpkinseeds begin to build nests. Nesting sites are typically in shallow water on sand or gravel lake bottoms. The males use their caudal fins to sweep out shallow, oval-shaped nesting holes that stretch about twice the length of the pumpkinseed itself. The fish remove debris and large rocks from their nests with their mouths.

Nests are arranged in colonies consisting of about three to 15 nests each. Often, pumpkinseeds build their nests near bluegill colonies, and the two species interbreed. Male pumpkinseeds are vigorous and aggressive, and defend their nests by spreading their opercula. Because of this aggressive behavior, pumpkinseeds tend to maintain larger territories than bluegills.

Females arrive after the nests are completed, coming in from deeper waters. The male then releases milt and the female releases eggs. Females may spawn in more than one nest, and more than one female may use the same nest. Also, more than one female will spawn with a male in one nest simultaneously. Females are able to produce 1,500 to 1,700 eggs, depending on their size and age.

Once released, the eggs stick to gravel, sand, or other debris in the nest, and they hatch in as few as three days. Females leave the nest immediately after spawning, but males remain and guard their offspring. The male guards them for about the first 11 days, returning them to the nest in his mouth if they stray from the nesting site.

The young fish stay on or near the shallow breeding area, and grow to about 2 in (5 cm) in their first year. Sexual maturity is usually achieved by age two. Pumpkinseeds have lived to be 12 years old in captivity, but in nature most do not exceed six to eight years old.

=== Diet ===
Pumpkinseeds are carnivorous and feed on a variety of small prey both at the water surface and at the bottom. Among their favorites are insects, small molluscs and crustaceans (such as small crawfish), worms, minnow fry, small frogs or tadpoles, and even cannibalizing other smaller pumpkinseeds. They are effective at destroying mosquito larvae and even occasionally consume small pieces of aquatic vegetation and detritus. They also will readily consume human food scraps, most notably bread which is commonly used for bait.

The pumpkinseed sunfish has a terminal mouth, allowing it to open at the anterior end of the snout. Pumpkinseed sunfish that live in waters with larger gastropods have larger mouths and associated jaw muscles to crack the shells.

=== Adaptations ===
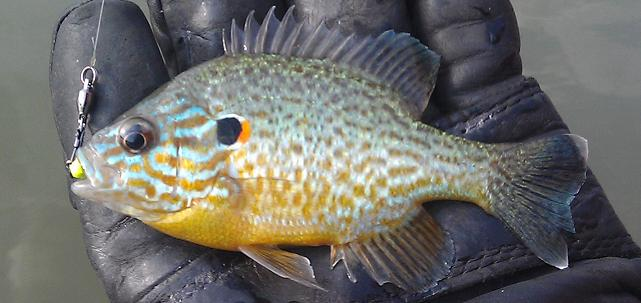
A young pumpkinseed with visible spines and gill plates

The pumpkinseed sunfish has adapted in many ways to the surroundings where it lives. Its skin reflects camouflage for its habitat. The pattern that appears on the pumpkinseed resembles that of the sunlight patterns that reflect on the shallow water of bays and river beds.

The pumpkinseed sunfish has developed a specific method of protection. Along the dorsal fin are 10 to 11 spines, and there are three additional spines on the anal fin. These spines are very sharp, which aid the fish in defense. The pumpkinseed has the ability to anticipate approaching predators (or prey) via a lateral line system, allowing it to detect changes or movements in the water using different mechanical receptors.

The brightly colored gill plates of the pumpkinseed sunfish also serve as a method of protection and dominance. Also known as an eye spot, the dark patch at the posterior of the gill plate provides the illusion that the eye of the fish is larger and positioned further back on the body, thus making the fish seem up to four times larger than it actually is. When a pumpkinseed feels threatened by a predator, it flares its gills to make it seem larger in size, and shows off the flashy red coloration. Males of the species also flare their gills in the spring spawning season in a show of dominance and territoriality.

In the southernmost regions of its distribution, the pumpkinseed has developed a larger mouth opening and abnormally large jaw muscles to aid in feeding; its forage is small crustaceans and mollusks. The larger bite radius and enhanced jaw muscles allow the pumpkinseed to crack the shells of their prey to attain the soft flesh within, thus providing one common name of 'shellcracker'.

== Conservation status ==
The pumpkinseed sunfish is very common and is not listed by CITES. It is considered Least Concern (not threatened) by the IUCN. Spawning grounds of the pumpkinseeds can be disturbed by shoreline development and shoreline erosion from heavy lake use. Their susceptibility to silt and pollution makes the pumpkinseed a good indicator of the cleanliness and health of water.

== Recreational fishing ==
The pumpkinseed is a very popular panfish with young anglers due to their typical abundance, willingness to bite baits, and their close locations to the shore. Many fishermen consider the pumpkinseed to be a nuisance fish, as it bites so easily and frequently that it disrupts fishermen who are actually attempting to catch something else. Although many people consider the meat of a pumpkinseed to be good-tasting, and they are low in fat and high in protein, it is typically not a popular game fish due to the small size.

Because pumpkinseeds tend to remain in the shallows and feed all day, they are relatively easy to catch via bank fishing. They will bite at most baits including garden worms, insects, leeches, pieces of fish meat or even crumbs of bread, and will also take small lures and can be fished for with a fly fishing rod with wet or dry flies. They will also hit at grubs early in the winter, but are less active from mid- to late winter. Although mostly popular with younger anglers, pumpkinseeds are often sought by adults as well, as the fish do put up an impressively vigorous fight when hooked.

The IGFA world record for the species stands at 0.68 kg (1 lb 8 oz), caught caught by Robert Warne near Honeoye, New York, in 2016.
