= Lovell River =

- Location within New Hampshire Location within the United States

Location
- Country: United States
- State: New Hampshire
- County: Carroll
- Towns: Moultonborough, Ossipee

Physical characteristics
- Source: Ossipee Mountains
  - location: Moultonborough
  - coordinates: 43°45′12″N 71°18′9″W
  - elevation: 2,230 ft (680 m)
- Mouth: Ossipee Lake
  - location: Ossipee
  - coordinates: 43°47′1″N 71°9′14″W
  - elevation: 407 ft (124 m)
- Length: 9.5 mi (15.3 km)

Basin features
- Tributaries
  - left: Gulf Brook, Jackson Brook
  - right: South Brook, White Brook

The Lovell River is a 9.5-mile-long (15.3 km) river in eastern New Hampshire in the United States. It is a tributary of Ossipee Lake, part of the Saco River watershed leading to the Atlantic Ocean.

The Lovell River flows out of the Ossipee Mountains, a circular mountain range lying south of the White Mountains. The river rises in the northeastern corner of the town of Moultonborough at the saddle between Faraway Mountain and Mount Shaw, the highest peaks in the Ossipees. The Lovell River flows east into the town of Ossipee, passing just south of Conner Pond and leaving the mountains at New Hampshire Route 16, after which it crosses a narrow river delta and enters Ossipee Lake.

== See also ==
- List of rivers of New Hampshire
