= Center Ossipee, New Hampshire =

Census-designated place in New Hampshire, United States

- Census-designated place
- Location within New Hampshire Location within the United States
- Coordinates: 43°45′09″N 71°08′58″W
- Country: United States
- State: New Hampshire
- County: Carroll
- Town: Ossipee

Area
  - Total: 1.00 sq mi (2.58 km^{2})
  - Land: 1.00 sq mi (2.58 km^{2})
  - Water: 0 sq mi (0.00 km^{2})
- Elevation: 532 ft (162 m)

Population (2020)
  - Total: 526
  - Density: 527.7/sq mi (203.73/km^{2})
- Time zone: UTC-5 (Eastern (EST))
  - Summer (DST): UTC-4 (EDT)
- ZIP code: 03814
- Area code: 603
- FIPS code: 33-10820
- GNIS feature ID: 2629719

Center Ossipee is a census-designated place in the town of Ossipee in Carroll County, New Hampshire, United States. The population was 526 at the 2020 census. It is one of the two main villages in the town, the other being Ossipee Corner (shown simply as "Ossipee" on topographic maps). Center Ossipee has a separate ZIP code (03814) from other portions of the town of Ossipee.

== Geography ==
The CDP is in the east-central part of the town of Ossipee, on high ground north of the Dan Hole River and southwest of Ossipee Lake. New Hampshire Route 16 and Route 25 bypass the village to the east. Route 16 leads south 6 miles (10 km) to Ossipee village and 36 miles (58 km) to Rochester; to the north it leads six miles to West Ossipee and 27 miles (43 km) to North Conway. Route 25 runs northward from the CDP, concurrently with Route 16 but turns west to Meredith, 28 miles (45 km) from Center Ossipee. To the east Route 25 leads 53 miles (85 km) to Portland, Maine.

According to the U.S. Census Bureau, the Center Ossipee CDP has a total area of 1.0 square mile (2.6 km^{2}), all of it recorded as land.

== Demographics ==
Historical population
Census	Pop.	Note	%±
2010	561		—
2020	526		−6.2%
U.S. Decennial Census

As of the census of 2010, there were 561 people, 229 households, and 139 families residing in the CDP. There were 256 housing units, of which 27, or 10.5%, were vacant. The racial makeup of the CDP was 96.8% white, 0.4% African American, 0.7% Native American, 1.1% Asian, and 1.1% from two or more races. 0.5% of the population were Hispanic or Latino of any race.

Of the 229 households in the CDP, 35.4% had children under the age of 18 living with them, 43.7% were headed by married couples living together, 13.1% had a female householder with no husband present, and 39.3% were non-families. 35.4% of all households were made up of individuals, and 14.8% were someone living alone who was 65 years of age or older. The average household size was 2.37, and the average family size was 3.00.

26.0% of residents in the CDP were under the age of 18, 7.0% were from age 18 to 24, 22.5% were from 25 to 44, 31.2% were from 45 to 64, and 13.4% were 65 years of age or older. The median age was 40.7 years. For every 100 females, there were 85.1 males. For every 100 females age 18 and over, there were 84.4 males.
