= Ossipee, New Hampshire =

- Town
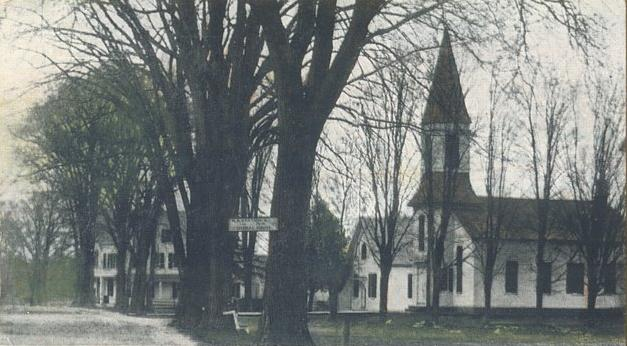
- Center Ossipee c. 1909

- Seal

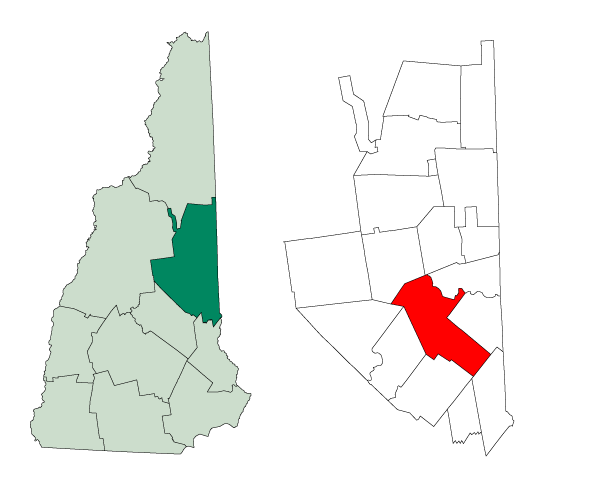
- Location in Carroll County, New Hampshire
- Coordinates: 43°44′25″N 71°09′02″W
- Country: United States
- State: New Hampshire
- County: Carroll
- Incorporated: 1785
- Villages: Center Ossipee; Granite; Moultonville; Ossipee Corner; Water Village; West Ossipee

Area
  - Total: 75.3 sq mi (195.0 km^{2})
  - Land: 70.5 sq mi (182.5 km^{2})
  - Water: 4.8 sq mi (12.4 km^{2}) 6.38%
- Elevation: 532 ft (162 m)

Population (2020)
  - Total: 4,372
  - Density: 62/sq mi (24/km^{2})
- Time zone: UTC-5 (Eastern)
  - Summer (DST): UTC-4 (Eastern)
- ZIP codes: 03814 (Center Ossipee); 03864 (Ossipee); 03890 (West Ossipee)
- Area code: 603
- FIPS code: 33-58740
- GNIS feature ID: 873694
- Website: www.ossipee.org

Ossipee is a town in Carroll County, New Hampshire, United States. The population was 4,372 at the 2020 census, and an estimated 4,599 in 2025. It is the county seat of Carroll County. Ossipee, which includes several villages, is a resort area and home to part of Pine River State Forest.

== History ==
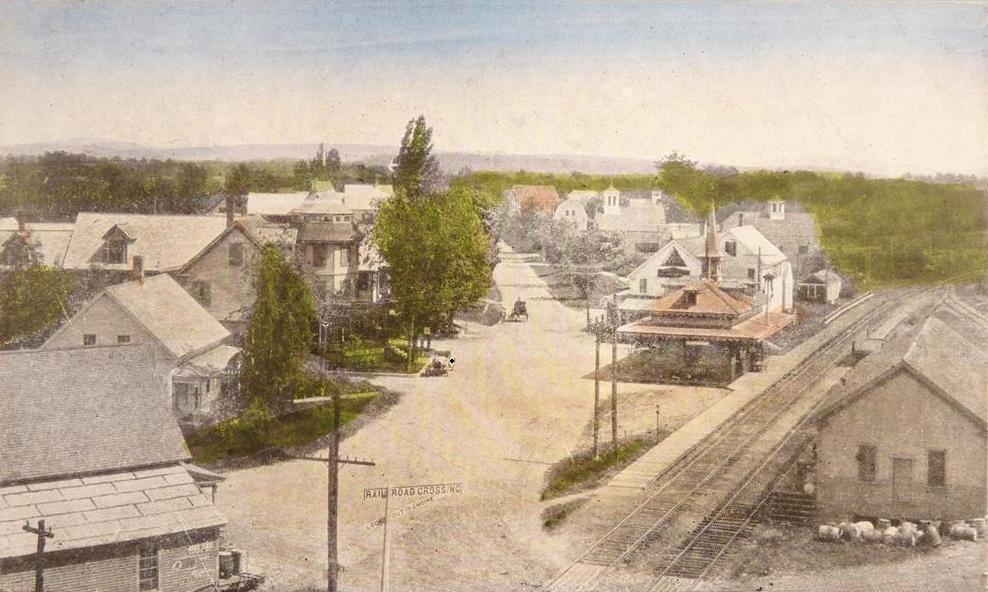
Center Ossipee c. 1915

Originally known as "Wigwam Village", and then "New Garden", the town was named for the Ossipee Indians, one of the twelve Algonquian tribes. It was once the site of an Indian stockade fort, designed to protect the tribe from the Mohawks in the west. In 1725, the Indian stockade was destroyed, and then rebuilt by Captain John Lovewell. The new fort was one of the largest in New England. The fort was located where the second green of Indian Mound Golf now is. Wood, ramrods and the brass bolt used for the gate were discovered when the course was built. On February 22, 1785, the legislature incorporated Ossipee as a town.

Although the surface of the town is "rough and uneven, and in some parts rocky and mountainous," farmers found it suitable for pasturage, as well as for cultivating wheat and potatoes. Principal goods were produce, lumber and cattle. In 1859, when the population was 2,123, Ossipee contained twelve sawmills, five gristmills, twelve clapboard and shingle mills, one bedstead factory, one door factory, a sash and blind factory, one paper mill and four tanneries. The Portsmouth, Great Falls & Conway Railroad in 1871 reached Ossipee Corner, with service extended in 1875 to Center Ossipee. The trains brought commerce and tourists, helping the town develop as a summer resort. Railroad service, however, would be discontinued in 1961 for passengers, and in 1972 for freight.

The town shares its name with the Ossipee Mountains, a circular mountain range marking the location of an ancient volcanic ring dike, which borders it on the west. Ossipee is a major source of sand and gravel, transported by railroad to Boston.

Ossipee claims to be the home of the first snowmobile. In 1917, Virgil D. White set up to create a patent for his conversion kit that changed the Ford Model T into a "snowmobile". He also copyrighted the term "snowmobile". At the time, the conversion kit was expensive, costing about $395. Virgil White applied his patent in 1918 and created his own snowmobile. In 1922, his conversion kit was on the markets and available only through Ford dealerships.

== Geography ==
According to the United States Census Bureau, the town has a total area of 75.3 square miles (195.0 km^{2}), of which 70.5 square miles (182.5 km^{2}) are land and 4.8 square miles (12.4 km^{2}) are water, comprising 6.38% of the town. Ossipee is drained by the Ossipee River and its tributaries. Ossipee Lake, in the northeastern part of the town, is the source of the Ossipee River and receives its tributaries the Pine, Beech, Bearcamp and Lovell rivers. The highest point in Ossipee is 2,080 feet (630 m) above sea level on an unnamed ridge in the Ossipee Mountains in the western part of town.

The town is crossed by state routes 16, 25, 28 and 171.

The two primary settlements in town are Center Ossipee, located near the southern junction of routes 16 and 25, and Ossipee Corner (shown as "Ossipee" on topographic maps), located 5 miles (8 km) south of Center Ossipee at the junction of routes 28 and 171 and close to Route 16. Other villages include West Ossipee, at the northern junction of routes 16 and 25 near the border with Tamworth; Moultonville, directly west of Center Ossipee; and Water Village, along Route 171 near the border with Tuftonboro.

=== Adjacent municipalities ===
- Madison (north)
- Freedom (north)
- Effingham (east)
- Wakefield (southeast)
- Wolfeboro (south)
- Tuftonboro (southwest)
- Moultonborough (west)
- Tamworth (northwest)

=== Climate ===
According to the Köppen climate classification, Ossipee has a warm-summer humid continental climate (abbreviated Dfb).

Climate data for Ossipee, 1991–2020 simulated normals (476 ft elevation)
Month	Jan	Feb	Mar	Apr	May	Jun	Jul	Aug	Sep	Oct	Nov	Dec	Year
Mean daily maximum °F (°C)	30.0 (−1.1)	33.3 (0.7)	41.5 (5.3)	54.7 (12.6)	67.1 (19.5)	75.7 (24.3)	80.8 (27.1)	79.5 (26.4)	71.6 (22.0)	58.5 (14.7)	46.0 (7.8)	35.4 (1.9)	56.2 (13.4)
Daily mean °F (°C)	19.6 (−6.9)	21.4 (−5.9)	30.4 (−0.9)	43.0 (6.1)	54.9 (12.7)	63.9 (17.7)	69.1 (20.6)	67.3 (19.6)	59.5 (15.3)	47.5 (8.6)	36.5 (2.5)	26.2 (−3.2)	44.9 (7.2)
Mean daily minimum °F (°C)	9.0 (−12.8)	9.7 (−12.4)	19.4 (−7.0)	31.1 (−0.5)	42.6 (5.9)	52.2 (11.2)	57.2 (14.0)	55.2 (12.9)	47.3 (8.5)	36.3 (2.4)	27.0 (−2.8)	17.1 (−8.3)	33.7 (0.9)
Average precipitation inches (mm)	3.38 (85.76)	3.17 (80.61)	3.72 (94.44)	4.11 (104.49)	3.65 (92.73)	4.34 (110.30)	4.21 (106.88)	3.79 (96.28)	3.77 (95.74)	5.22 (132.67)	4.11 (104.41)	4.39 (111.48)	47.86 (1,215.79)
Average dew point °F (°C)	11.7 (−11.3)	12.0 (−11.1)	19.0 (−7.2)	29.1 (−1.6)	41.9 (5.5)	53.1 (11.7)	58.8 (14.9)	57.9 (14.4)	51.4 (10.8)	39.2 (4.0)	28.0 (−2.2)	19.0 (−7.2)	35.1 (1.7)
Source: PRISM Climate Group

== Demographics ==
Historical population
Census	Pop.	Note	%±
1790	339		—
1800	1,143		237.2%
1810	1,330		16.4%
1820	1,988		49.5%
1830	1,935		−2.7%
1840	2,170		12.1%
1850	2,123		−2.2%
1860	1,997		−5.9%
1870	1,822		−8.8%
1880	1,782		−2.2%
1890	1,630		−8.5%
1900	1,479		−9.3%
1910	1,354		−8.5%
1920	1,122		−17.1%
1930	1,230		9.6%
1940	1,498		21.8%
1950	1,412		−5.7%
1960	1,409		−0.2%
1970	1,647		16.9%
1980	2,465		49.7%
1990	3,309		34.2%
2000	4,211		27.3%
2010	4,345		3.2%
2020	4,372		0.6%
2024 (est.)	4,608		5.4%
U.S. Decennial Census

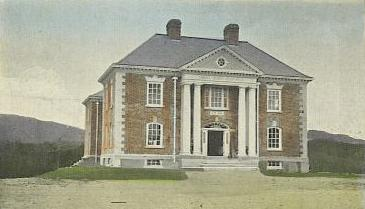
The Carroll County Courthouse in 1921. Built in 1916, it is now the Ossipee Historical Society Museum.

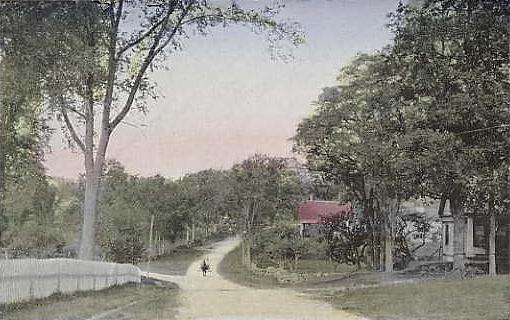
Street scene c. 1910

As of the census of 2010, there were 4,345 people, 1,826 households, and 1,165 families residing in the town. There were 3,057 housing units, of which 1,231, or 40.3%, were vacant. 1,045 of the vacant units were for seasonal or recreational use. The racial makeup of the town was 97.1% white, 0.4% African American, 0.3% Native American, 0.6% Asian, 0.0% Native Hawaiian or Pacific Islander, 0.1% some other race, and 1.5% from two or more races. 1.0% of the population were Hispanic or Latino of any race.

Of the 1,826 households, 25.2% had children under the age of 18 living with them, 49.1% were headed by married couples living together, 8.8% had a female householder with no husband present, and 36.2% were non-families. 29.6% of all households were made up of individuals, and 11.3% were someone living alone who was 65 years of age or older. The average household size was 2.28, and the average family size was 2.76.

In the town, 19.0% of the population were under the age of 18, 6.7% were from 18 to 24, 20.6% from 25 to 44, 34.3% from 45 to 64, and 19.4% were 65 years of age or older. The median age was 47.4 years. For every 100 females, there were 100.5 males. For every 100 females age 18 and over, there were 99.3 males.

For the period 2011–2015, the estimated median annual income for a household was $46,203, and the median income for a family was $60,758. Male full-time workers had a median income of $43,009 versus $37,468 for females. The per capita income for the town was $24,443. 17.9% of the population and 14.7% of families were below the poverty line. 16.8% of the population under the age of 18 and 12.7% of those 65 or older were living in poverty.

== Economy ==
The largest employers are Carroll County Government, Hannaford, Affinity, and Ossipee Aggregates.

Ossipee has a low-power community radio station, 102.3 FM WGGG-LP, which began in 2024.

== Sites of interest ==
- Ossipee Historical Society Museum
- Ossipee Lake
- Ossipee Pine Barrens

== Notable people ==
- Dale Bozzio (born 1955), lead singer of 1980s band Missing Persons
- Fred H. Brown (1879–1955), US senator, 59th governor of New Hampshire
- Captain John Lovewell (1691–1725), soldier
- Chester Earl Merrow (1906–1974), US congressman
- William B. Small (1817–1878), US congressman
- John Greenleaf Whittier (1807–1892), poet (summer resident)

== See also ==
- Murder of Florence Arlene Small, which occurred in Ossipee in 1916
- USS Ossipee, two former ships of the United States Navy
