= Ossipee Lake =

Lake in Carroll County, New Hampshire

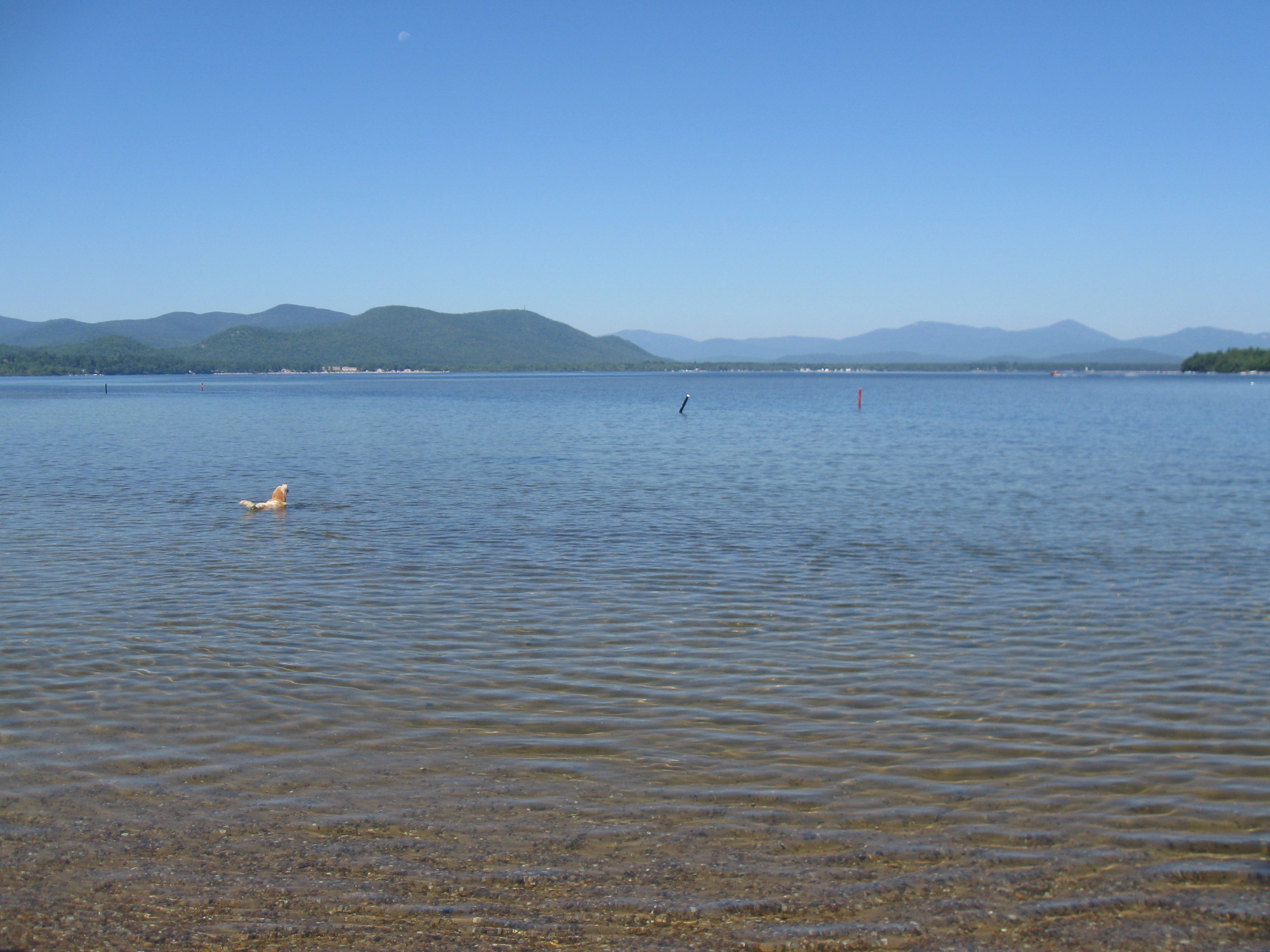

- Location within New Hampshire
- Location: Carroll County, New Hampshire
- Coordinates: 43°47′29″N 71°8′23″W
- Primary inflows: Bearcamp River; Lovell River; Pine River; West Branch
- Primary outflows: Ossipee River
- Basin countries: United States
- Max. length: 3.5 miles (5.6 km)
- Max. width: 2.3 miles (3.7 km)
- Surface area: 3,257 acres (13.18 km^{2})
- Average depth: 27 ft (8.2 m)
- Max. depth: 73 ft (22 m)
- Surface elevation: 407 feet (124 m)
- Settlements: Ossipee; Freedom

Ossipee Lake is located in Carroll County in eastern New Hampshire, in the communities of Ossipee and Freedom. At 3,257 acres (1,318 ha), it is the sixth-largest lake located entirely in New Hampshire. The lake is fed by the West Branch (entering from the north), the Bearcamp and Lovell rivers (entering from the west), and the Pine River (from the south). Water leaves the eastern end of the lake via the Ossipee River, flowing to the Saco River in Maine.

Ossipee Lake is a popular vacation site. The land surrounding the lake is home to numerous condo, cabin, and lake house developments. As in most lakes regions, some buildings are available for vacation rentals, and many of the developments have private beaches.

The lake is classified as a cold- and warmwater fishery, with observed species including rainbow trout, lake trout, land-locked salmon, smallmouth and largemouth bass, chain pickerel, yellow perch, white perch, sunfish, and brown bullhead.

== See also ==
- List of lakes in New Hampshire
