= Deer Creek =

Deer Creek may refer to some places in the United States and Canada:

== Communities in the United States ==
- Deer Creek, Arizona
- Deer Creek, Illinois
- Deer Creek, Carroll County, Indiana
- Deer Creek, Lake County, Indiana
- Deer Creek, Kansas (renamed to Stull)
- Deer Creek, Minnesota
- Deer Creek, Oklahoma
- Deer Creek, West Virginia
- Deer Creek, Outagamie County, Wisconsin
- Deer Creek, Taylor County, Wisconsin

== Schools ==
- Deer Creek Middle School, a public school in Littleton, Colorado
- Deer Creek Public Schools, a public school district in Edmond, Oklahoma

== Waterways ==
=== United States ===
- Deer Creek (Arizona)
- Deer Creek (Butler Creek tributary), Arkansas and Missouri
- Deer Creek (Nevada County, California)
- Deer Creek (Santa Clara County, California)
- Deer Creek (Tehama County, California)
- Deer Creek (Tulare County, California)
- Deer Creek (Indiana)
- Deer Creek (Des Moines River tributary), Iowa
- Deer Creek (Neosho River tributary), Kansas
- Deer Creek (Maryland)
- Deer Creek (South Branch Galien River tributary), Michigan
- Deer Creek (Mississippi)
- Deer Creek (North Fork Salt River tributary), Missouri
- Deer Creek (Osage River tributary), Missouri
- Deer Creek (Pomme de Terre River tributary), Missouri
- Deer Creek (River des Peres tributary), Missouri
- Deer Creek (Shoal Creek tributary), Missouri
- Deer Creek (South Grand River tributary), Missouri
- Deer Creek (Blanchard River tributary), Ohio
- Deer Creek (Oklahoma)
- Deer Creek (Allegheny River tributary), Pennsylvania
- Deer Creek Dam and Reservoir, Utah

=== Canada ===
- Deer Creek (Big Creek, Ontario)

== Other ==
- Deer Creek Tunnel, Cincinnati, Ohio
- Deer Creek Marsh Wildlife Management Area, Oswego County, New York
- Ruoff Music Center, an outdoor music venue in Noblesville, Indiana, originally known as Deer Creek Music Center

== See also ==
- Deer Creek Township (disambiguation)
- Deer River (disambiguation)
