= Deer River =

Deer River may refer to a water body or a community:

== Canada ==
- Deer River (Manitoba), a tributary of the Dog River

== United Kingdom ==
- River Deer, a tributary of the River Tamar in Cornwall

== United States ==
- Deer River (Michigan), a stream in Iron County
- Deer River, Minnesota, a city and a stream in Itasca County
- Deer River (Mississippi River), a river of Minnesota
- Deer River (New Hampshire), a tributary of Ossipee Lake
- Deer River (Black River), a tributary of the Black River (New York)
  - An unincorporated community in Lewis County, New York, named after the stream
- Deer River (St. Regis River), a tributary of the St. Regis River in New York

== Other ==
- Red Deer River
- Forked Deer River

== See also ==
- Deer (disambiguation)
- Deer Creek (disambiguation)
