= Deer River (New Hampshire) =

- The Deer River at New Hampshire Route 41 near Silver Lake

- Location within New Hampshire Location within the United States

Location
- Country: United States
- State: New Hampshire
- County: Carroll
- Town: Madison

Physical characteristics
- Source: Confluence of Ham Brook and Salter Brook
  - location: Madison
  - coordinates: 43°54′30″N 71°11′39″W
  - elevation: 610 ft (190 m)
- Mouth: Silver Lake
  - location: Madison
  - coordinates: 43°53′2″N 71°10′35″W
  - elevation: 468 ft (143 m)
- Length: 2.6 mi (4.2 km)

The Deer River is a 2.6-mile-long (4.2 km) stream in eastern New Hampshire in the United States. It is a tributary of Silver Lake, part of the Ossipee Lake / Saco River watershed leading to the Atlantic Ocean.

The Deer River lies entirely within the town of Madison, New Hampshire. It begins at a wetland where Ham Brook and Salter Brook join, then flows south through woodlands to the village of Silver Lake, where it enters the north end of Silver Lake, the water body.

== See also ==
- List of rivers of New Hampshire
