= Deer Creek Township, Indiana =

Deer Creek Township is the name of three townships in the U.S. state of Indiana:

- Deer Creek Township, Carroll County, Indiana
- Deer Creek Township, Cass County, Indiana
- Deer Creek Township, Miami County, Indiana

== See also ==
- Deer Creek Township (disambiguation)
