= West Virginia Route 66 =

State highway in West Virginia, United States

West Virginia Route 66

Route information
- Maintained by West Virginia Division of Highways
- Length: 16.1 mi (25.9 km)

Major junctions
- West end: US 219 / WV 55 near Snowshoe
- East end: WV 28 / WV 92 near Green Bank

Location
- Country: United States
- State: West Virginia
- Counties: Pocahontas

Highway system
- West Virginia State Highway System; Interstate; US; State
← WV 65	→ WV 67

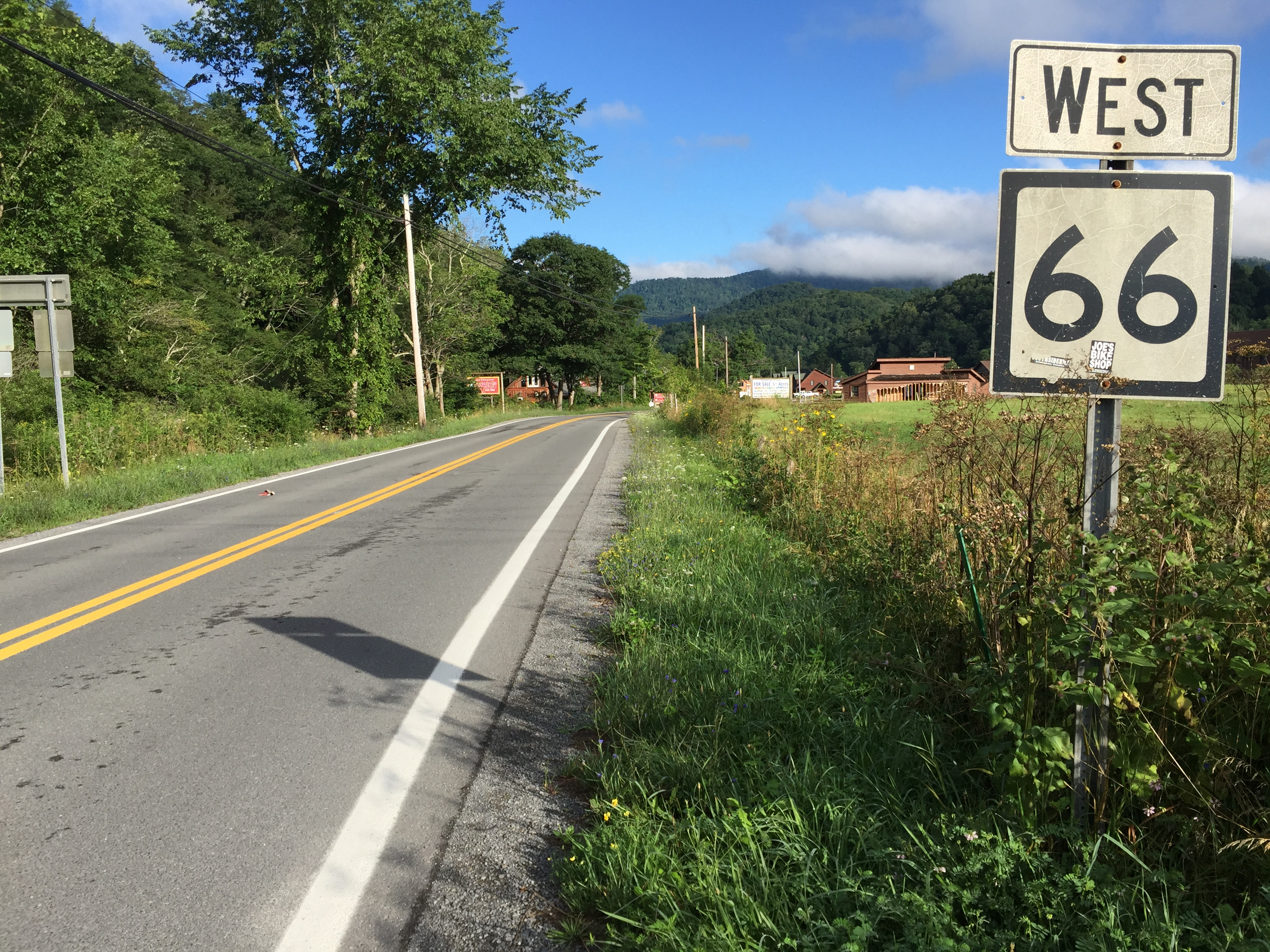
View west along WV 66 at CR 9/3 (Snowshoe Drive) in Linwood

West Virginia Route 66 is an east–west state highway located within Pocahontas County, West Virginia. The route runs 16.1 miles (25.9 km) from U.S. Route 219 and West Virginia Route 55 near Snowshoe east to West Virginia Route 28 and West Virginia Route 92 south of Green Bank. WV 66 is maintained by the West Virginia Division of Highways.

== Route description ==
WV 66 begins at a 3-way intersection with the concurrent US 219 and WV 55 at the base of Cheat Mountain near Snowshoe, in the unincorporated community of Linwood. The route initially heads southeast along the northern bank of the Big Spring Fork. WV 66 then meets Pocahontas County Route 9/3, a loop route which serves as the primary access road to the Snowshoe Mountain ski resort.

After passing south of Snowshoe, WV 66 turns eastward toward the community of Cass. The route intersects Pocahontas County Route 1 and passes north of the community of Deer Creek before entering Cass. WV 66 intersects County Route 1 again and crosses the Greenbrier River in Cass before turning northeast and following the north bank of Deer Creek. After a junction with Pocahontas County Route 7/1, WV 66 crosses Deer Creek and heads eastward. The road terminates at the concurrent WV 28 and WV 92 south of Green Bank.

== Major intersections ==
The entire route is in Pocahontas County.

Location	mi	km	Destinations	Notes
Linwood	0.0	0.0	US 219 / WV 55 – Slatyfork, Marlinton, Elkins	
	16.1	25.9	WV 28 / WV 92 – Green Bank, Marlinton, White Sulphur Springs	
1.000 mi = 1.609 km; 1.000 km = 0.621 mi
