= NH 41 =

NH 41 may refer to:

- National Highway 41 (India)
- New Hampshire Route 41 (U.S.)
