= Miniature Railway at Silver Lake, Ohio =

15-inch gauge railroad in Ohio

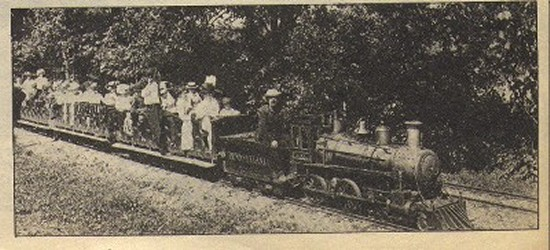
- Armitage-Herschell train around 1902

Commercial operations
- Built by: The Ohio Steel Company
- Original gauge: 7 1/4 in (184 mm) 5 in (127 mm) 3 1/2 in (89 mm)

Preserved operations
- Operated by: Silver Lake Park
- Stations: 1
- Length: 600 yards (549 m)

Commercial history
- Opened: 1902
- Closed: 1917

The Miniature Railway at Silver Lake, Ohio was a 15 in (381 mm) gauge miniature railway inaugurated by the Lodge family in 1902 at Silver Lake, Ohio.

== History ==
The ridable miniature railway was hauled by a scaled-down steam locomotive, but the open passenger cars had no role model. The small locomotive was built around 1901 by the Armitage-Herschell Company of North Tonawanda in Niagara County, New York, as park railways became increasingly popular. The locomotives of this manufacturer could pull up to 10 passenger cars with seats for 40 children or 20 adults.

The steam locomotive, its tender, and three passenger cars were purchased for $1,050 for the locomotive and $75 for each car, equivalent to a price of $1.00 per pound, as the locomotive weighed 1,050 pounds (480 kg). The Ohio Steel Company of Cuyahoga Falls made miniature rails with the unusually large weight of 16 lb/yd (7.9 kg/m), twice as heavy as those for other park railways, as well as switches and their flange-bearing frogs for $42/t.

The railway loop began south of the large pavilion, built in 1898. The station was on the lakeshore at the boat-landing dock. The route led along the lakeshore, passing an old log cabin next to the later aquarium. It then passed the shooting gallery, the stone-built ice store, which was later rebuilt into the cage of the pumas, as well as cages for monkeys, a wolf, raccoons, a badger, and foxes. From there, one could also see the aviaries for an eagle, hawks, and owls, and the bear pits. After the menagerie, it led again along the lake, passed the "Linwood" log-cabin to another stretch along the lakeshore. This original route allowed the passengers a view of the lake and the zoo animals, which made the menagerie quickly known.

The miniature railway with this original route, though, was not as profitable as it should have been, because it was too far away from the main business. The following year, therefore, the track was laid along a new route with a long detour. This doubled the journey time, and the train journey became very popular. Over the years, the route had been changed several times.

Starting in the second summer, the locomotive had to be repaired repeatedly. Steamboat engineer Frank Jones was a valuable aid in repairing the locomotive and its parts. Nevertheless, the locomotive was taken out of service and offered for sale.

Sammy Wise, a little person from Loudonville, Ohio, was employed as the first conductor of the park railway. He was just 48 inches (1.22 m) tall at the age of 28 when he came to Silver Lake. He was well-proportioned and self-important, and very popular with campers and colleagues. In his uniform with a shiny lantern on his left arm and his ticket punch in his right hand, he was an attractive little conductor. He worked with the park railroad for several summers, until his death in the winter of 1906-1907.

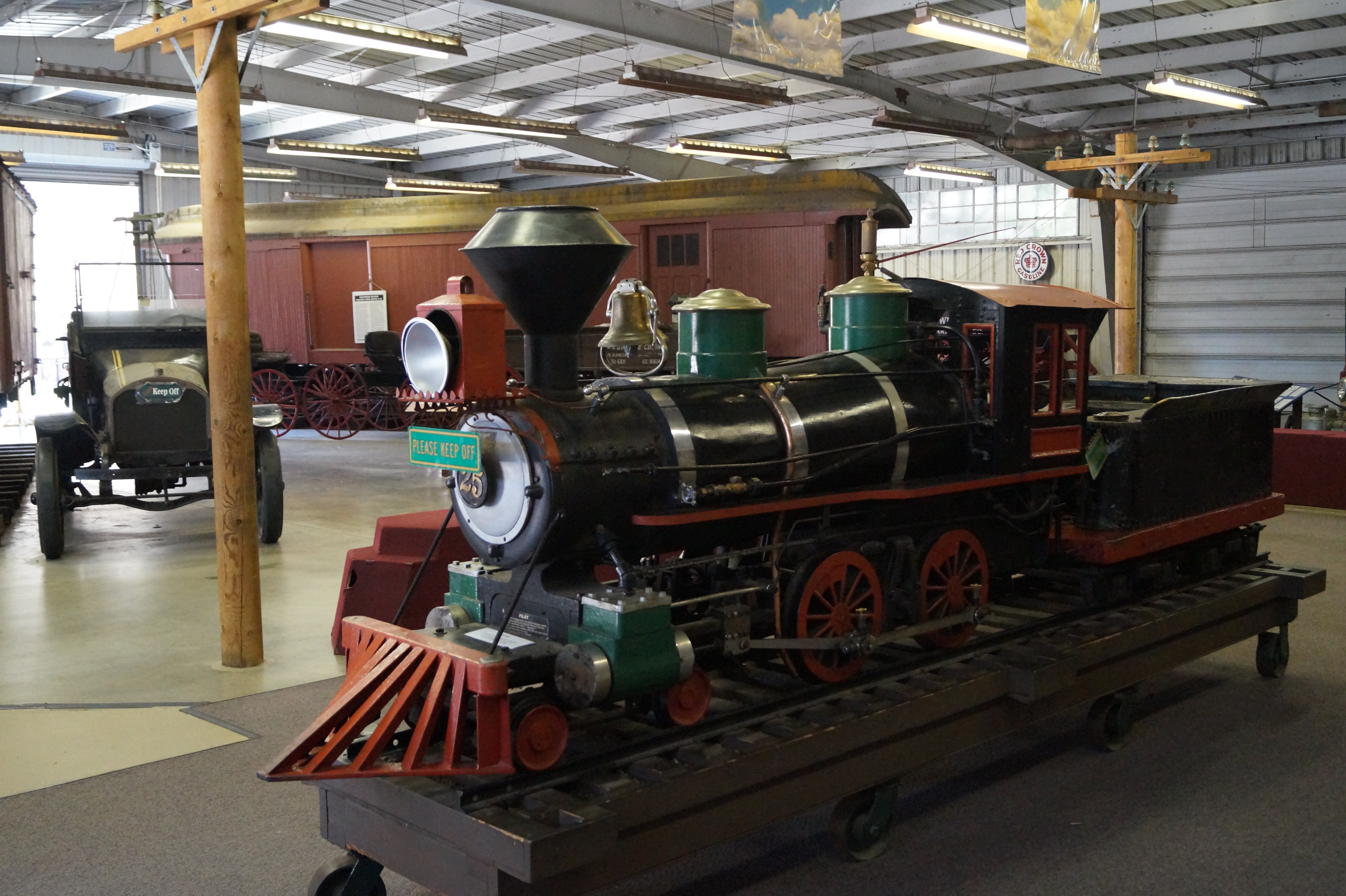
Little General steam locomotive at Travel Town Museum

George Lodge was very enthusiastic about the train and the locomotive that he had built together with Frank Jones and Sammy Wise in 1903 for several months, using a new boiler of Biggs Boiler Works in Akron. In 1904, he built a more powerful locomotive, which was eventually called the Little General and is now on display in Travel Town Museum. After Frank Jones had died, he manufactured another even larger locomotive in his own workshop. He also built five new cars so that two trains with four cars each could drive at the same time.

The summer season of 1917 was the last time the park was operated, but the park railroad continued to be popular and in operation. The selling price of the park did not include the rails, locomotives, and trains. Since William Lodge could not find another buyer, he bought the rails and rolling stock for $1,000 and stored them on his farm. After a few years, he sold the locomotive and wagons to Buckeye Lake Park Co. in Licking County, Ohio. This operated the trains for several summers and then sold them to a park near Toledo, where they were still in operation in 1944.

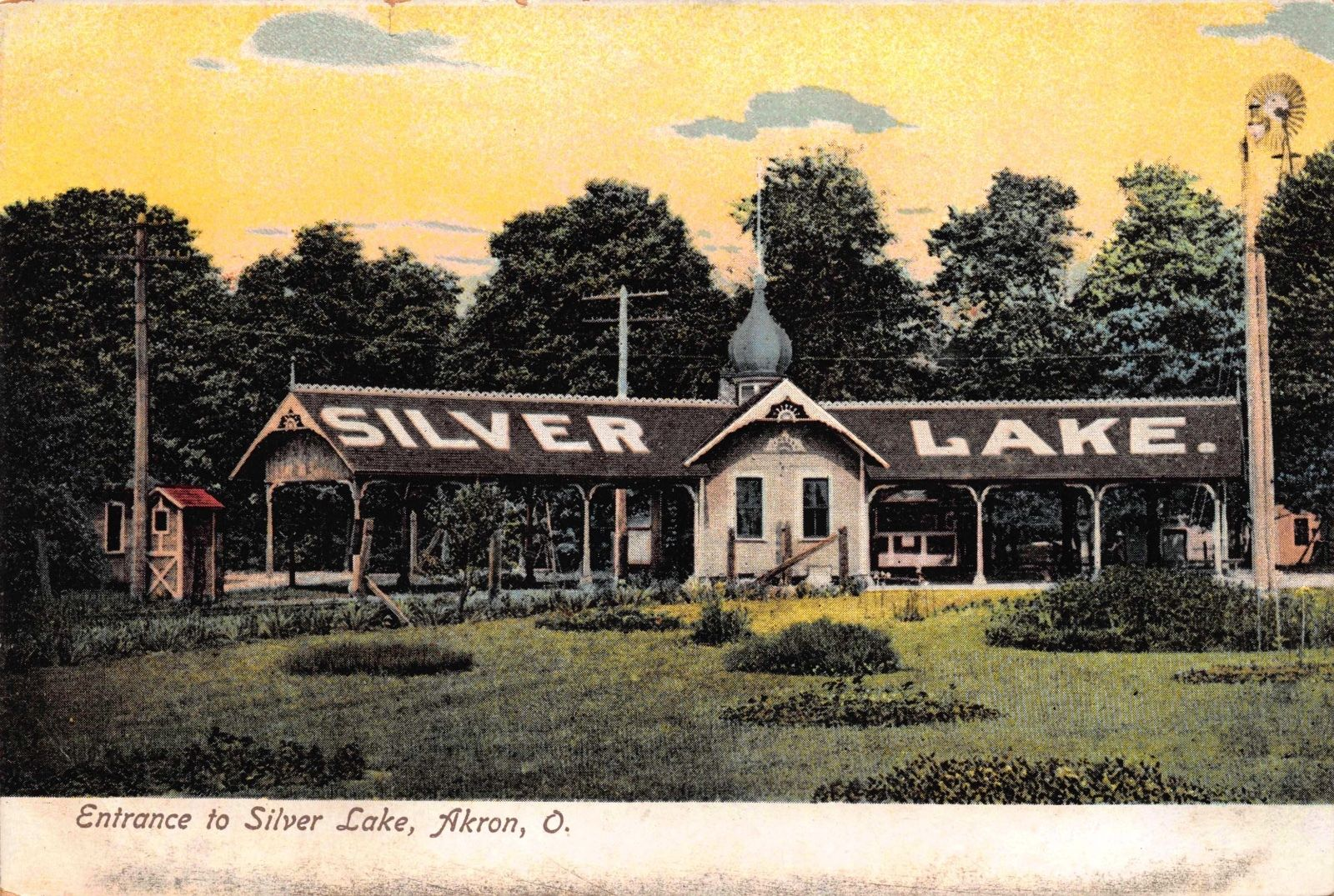
Entrance to Silver Lake, Akron, Ohio

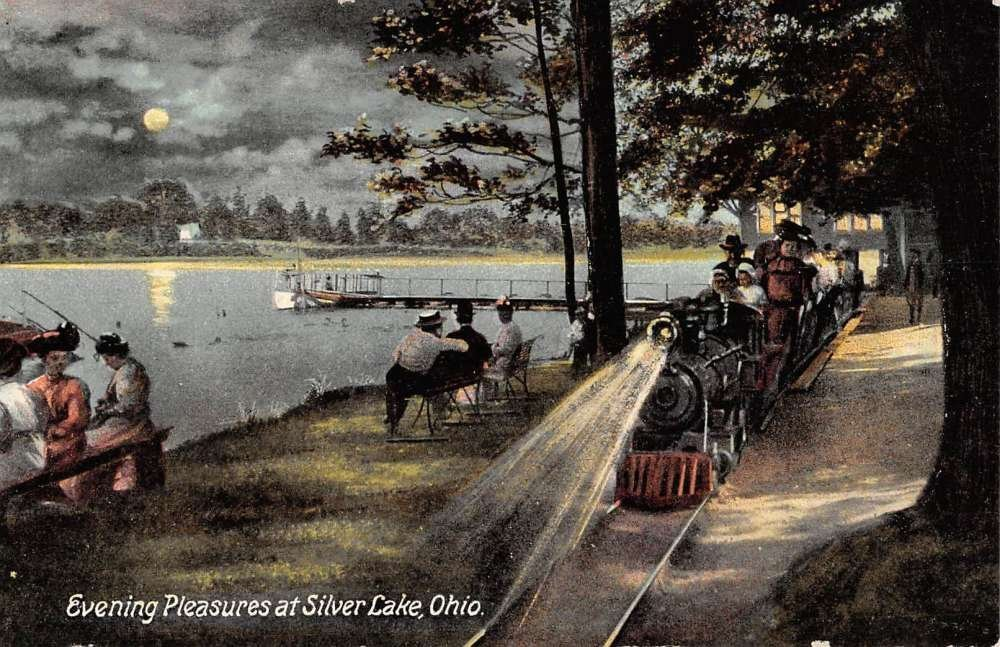
Evening pleasures at Silver Lake, Ohio

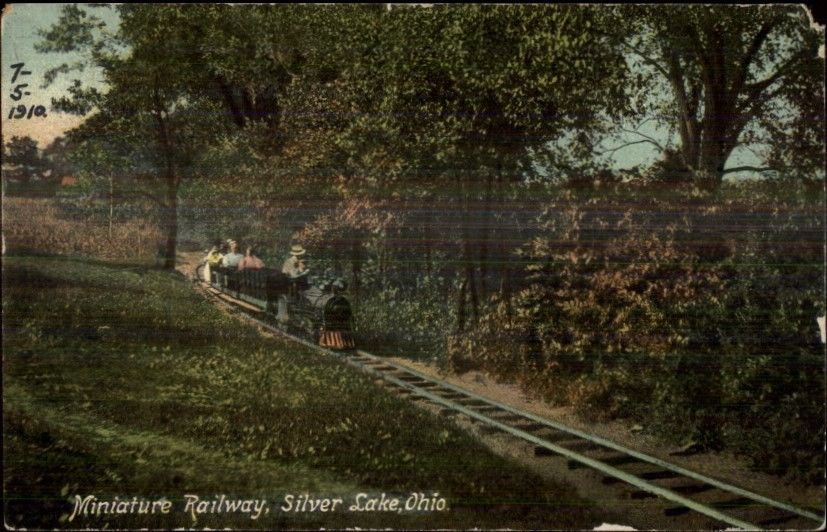
Miniature Railway, Silver Lake, Ohio

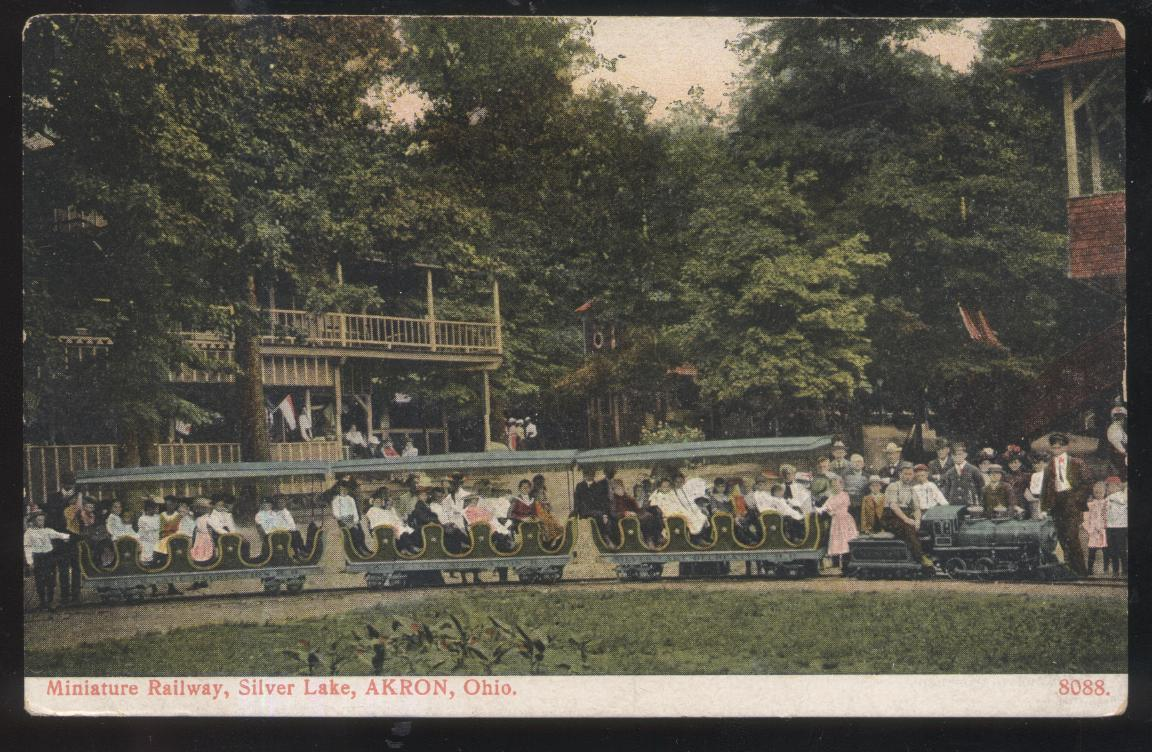
Miniature Railway, Silver Lake, Akron, Ohio

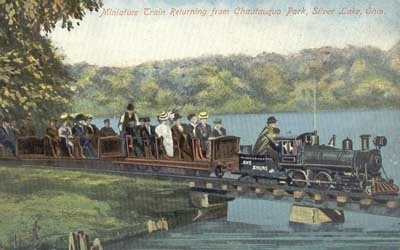
Miniature train returning from Chautauqua Park

== See also ==
- Silver Lake Railroad in Madison, New Hampshire
