= New Hampshire Route 41 =

State highway in Carroll County, New Hampshire, US

New Hampshire Route 41
- NH 41 highlighted in red

Route information
- Maintained by NHDOT
- Length: 5.033 mi (8.100 km)

Major junctions
- South end: NH 16 in Ossipee
- North end: NH 113 in Silver Lake

Location
- Country: United States
- State: New Hampshire
- Counties: Carroll

Highway system
- New Hampshire Highway System; Interstate; US; State; Turnpikes
← NH 38	→ NH 43

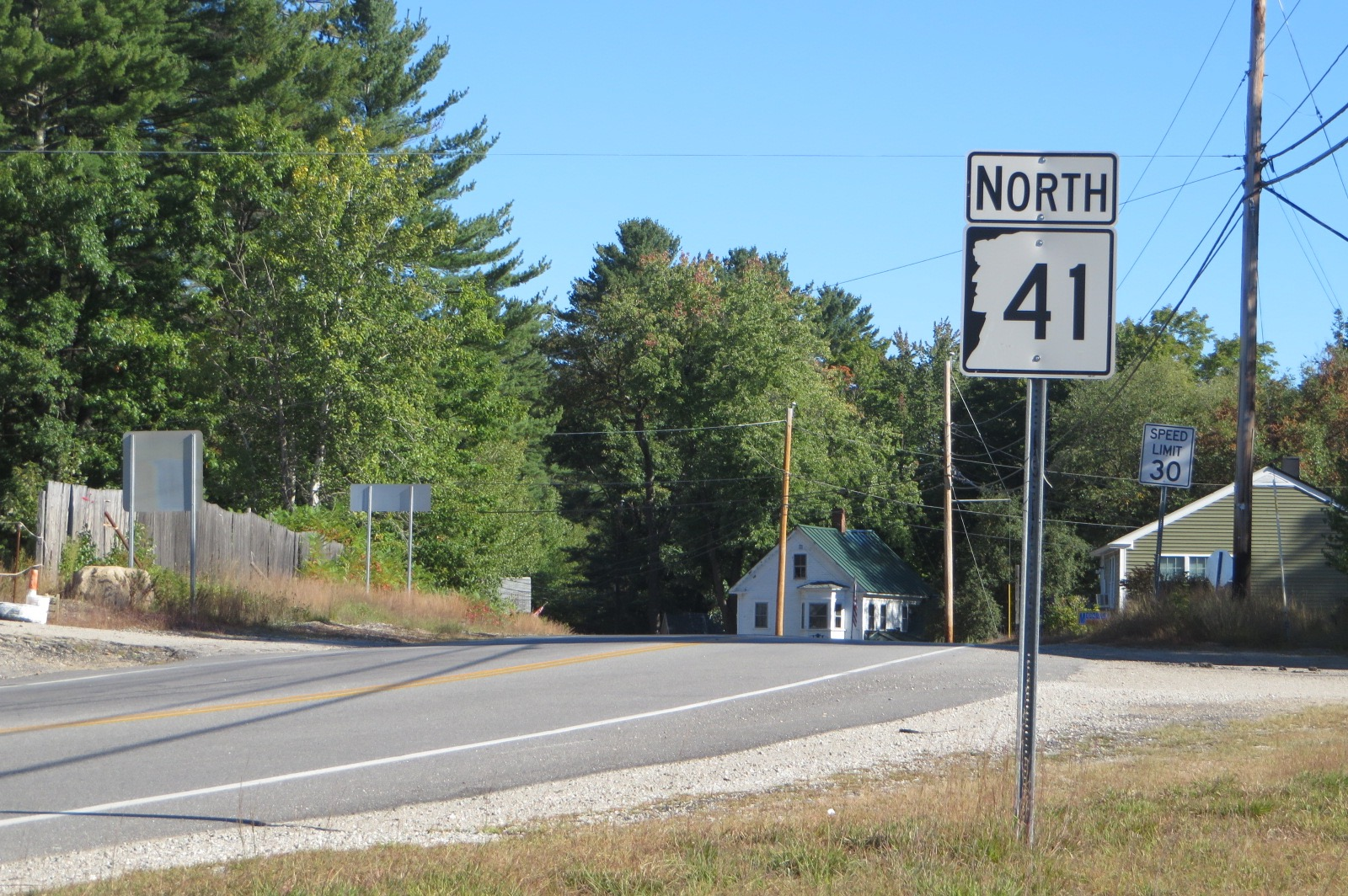
NH 41 leaving from its southern terminus in West Ossipee, NH

New Hampshire Route 41 (abbreviated NH 41) is a 5.033-mile-long (8.100 km) north–south state highway in east-central New Hampshire. It is the main road connecting Silver Lake with Ossipee. The highway skirts the western edge of the lake named Silver Lake and provides access to local roads at the lakeside.

NH 41, along with NH 113, provides an alternate to the often-congested NH 16 between Ossipee and Conway.

== Route description ==
NH 41 begins in West Ossipee at an intersection with NH 16, just past its northern split with NH 25. NH 41 proceeds northeast, crossing through a small corner of southeastern Tamworth before entering the town of Madison. NH 41 turns due north and skirts the western edge of Silver Lake for a few miles before ending at NH 113 in the village of Silver Lake, near the lake's northern tip.

== Junction list ==
The entire route is in Carroll County.

Location	mi	km	Destinations	Notes
Ossipee	0.000	0.000	NH 16 (White Mountain Highway) to NH 25 – Wakefield, Tamworth	Southern terminus
Madison	5.033	8.100	NH 113 (Village Road) – Madison, Albany	Northern terminus
1.000 mi = 1.609 km; 1.000 km = 0.621 mi
