= West Branch (New Hampshire) =

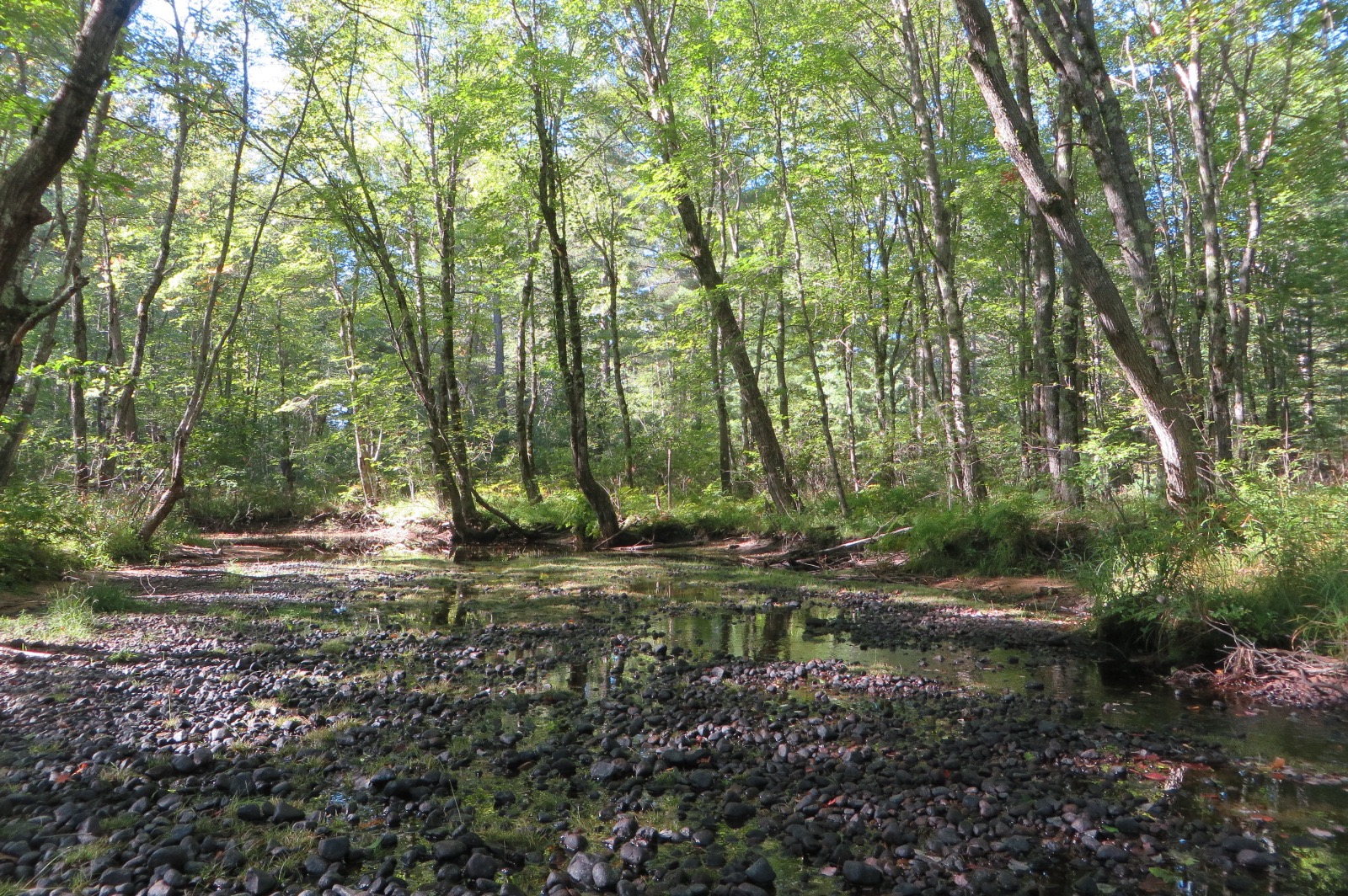
- The West Branch at summer low level north of Ossipee Lake

- Location within New Hampshire Location within the United States

Location
- Country: United States
- State: New Hampshire
- County: Carroll
- Towns: Madison, Freedom, Ossipee

Physical characteristics
- Source: Silver Lake
  - location: Madison
  - coordinates: 43°50′55″N 71°10′17″W
  - elevation: 468 ft (143 m)
- Mouth: Ossipee Lake
  - location: Ossipee / Freedom
  - coordinates: 43°48′32″N 71°9′44″W
  - elevation: 407 ft (124 m)
- Length: 5.5 mi (8.9 km)

The West Branch is a 5.5-mile-long (8.9 km) river located in eastern New Hampshire in the United States. It is the northern tributary of Ossipee Lake, part of the Saco River watershed leading to the Atlantic Ocean.

The West Branch begins at the outlet of Silver Lake in the southern corner of Madison, New Hampshire, and takes a winding course south towards Ossipee Lake. It forms the boundary between the towns of Freedom and Ossipee. The flat, sandy terrain through which the river flows is known as the West Branch Pine Barrens and is the site of a nature preserve owned and managed by The Nature Conservancy.

== See also ==
- List of rivers of New Hampshire
