= Madison Boulder =

Glacially-deposited rock in New Hampshire, USA

Madison Boulder Natural Area
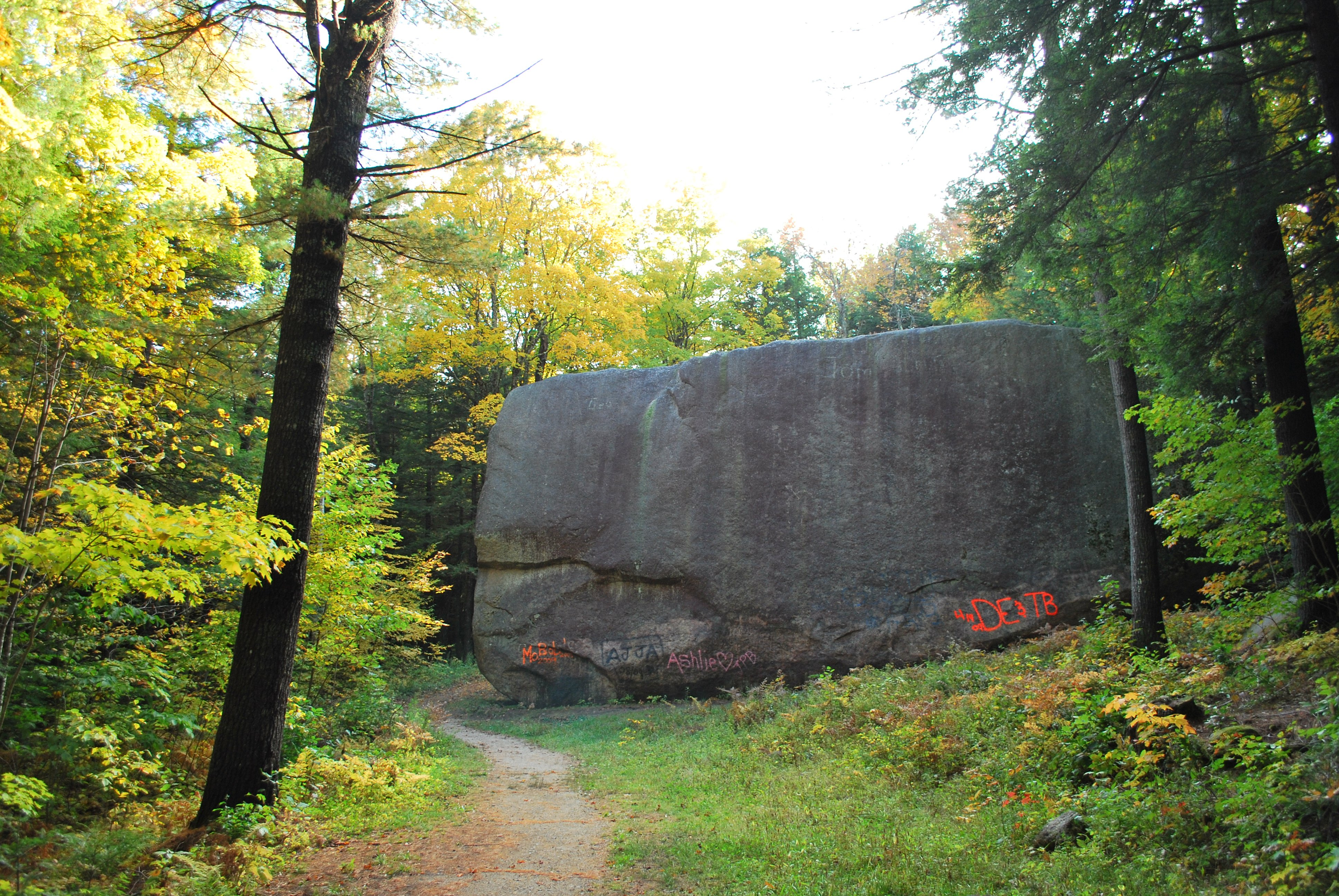
- Madison Boulder

- Location within New Hampshire
- Interactive map of Madison Boulder Natural Area
- Location: Madison, New Hampshire, United States
- Coordinates: 43°55′53″N 71°10′04″W
- Area: 17 acres (6.9 ha)
- Elevation: 512 feet (156 m)
- Established: 1946
- Administrator: New Hampshire Division of Parks and Recreation
- Website: Official website

U.S. National Natural Landmark
- Designated: 1970

The Madison Boulder is one of the largest known glacial erratics in North America and among the largest in the world; it is preserved in the 17-acre (6.9 ha) Madison Boulder Natural Area in Madison, New Hampshire. The boulder is a huge granite rock measuring 83 feet (25 m) in length, 23 feet (7.0 m) in height above the ground, and 37 feet (11 m) in width. It weighs upwards of 5,000 short tons (4,500,000 kg). A part of the block is buried, probably to a depth of 10 to 12 feet (3.0 to 3.7 m). It was acquired by the state from the Kennett family in 1946. In 1970, the Madison Boulder was designated as a National Natural Landmark by the National Park Service.

== See also ==
- List of individual rocks
