= Magnolia Creek =

Stream in St. Louis County, Missouri, U.S.

Coordinates: 38°38′15″N 90°23′46″W

Magnolia Creek is a stream in St. Louis County in the U.S. state of Missouri. It is a tributary to Deer Creek.

Magnolia Creek was named for the magnolia trees near its course.
