= Dog River (Manitoba) =

- Location of the mouth of the river in Manitoba

Location
- Country: Canada
- Province: Manitoba
- Region: Northern
- Census division: 23

Physical characteristics
- Source: Unnamed lake
  - coordinates: 57°43′24″N 94°55′58″W
  - elevation: 190 m (620 ft)
- Mouth: Churchill River
  - coordinates: 58°23′59″N 94°15′02″W
  - elevation: 9 m (30 ft)

Basin features
- River system: Hudson Bay drainage basin
- Tributaries
  - right: Deer River

The Dog River is a river in Census division 23 in Northern Manitoba, Canada. It is in the Hudson Bay drainage basin and is a right tributary of the Churchill River.

The Dog River begins at an unnamed lake and flows east, then turns north, heading roughly parallel to the Deer River, which it takes in as a right tributary, and reaches its mouth at the Churchill River, 45 kilometres (28 mi) upstream of that river's own mouth at Hudson Bay.
