= Madison School, District No. 1 =

- Madison Corner School, District No. 1
- U.S. National Register of Historic Places
- NH State Register of Historic Places
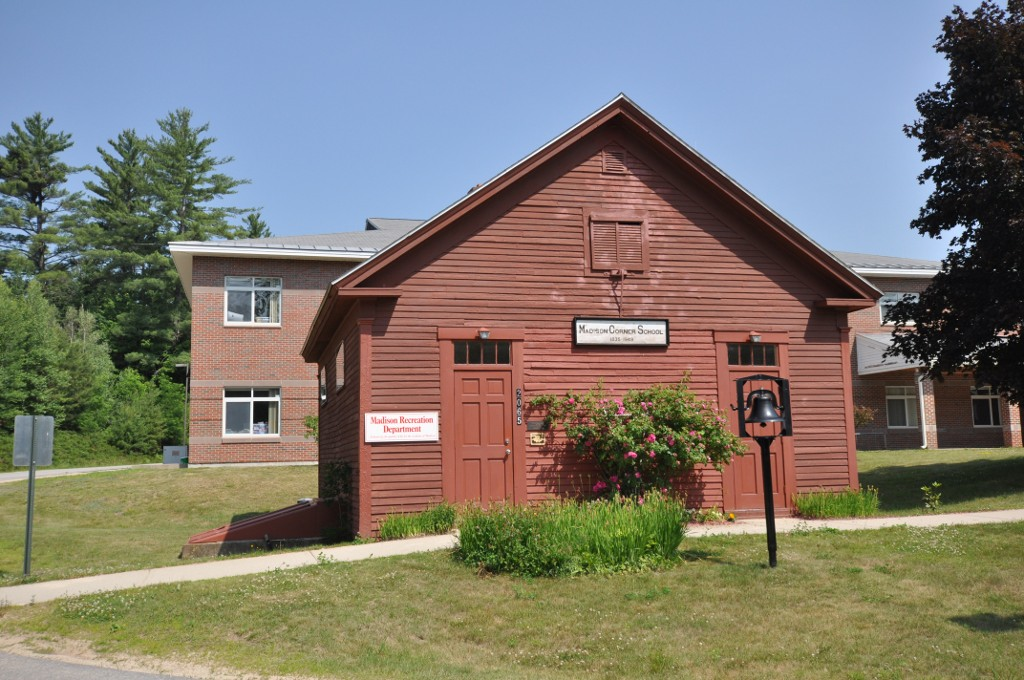

- Location within New Hampshire Location within the United States
- Location: NH 113, Madison, New Hampshire
- Coordinates: 43°53′47″N 71°9′12″W
- Area: less than one acre
- Architectural style: Greek Revival
- NRHP reference No.: 80000271

Significant dates
- Added to NRHP: December 11, 1980
- Designated NHSRHP: May 1, 2006

The Madison Corner School, District No. 1 is a historic one-room district schoolhouse, located on the grounds of the Madison Elementary School on New Hampshire Route 113 in Madison, New Hampshire. The school was built in 1835, and continues to exhibit Greek Revival characteristics despite alterations in 1873 and 1951. It was used as a school until 1950, has hosted town meetings, and has served as the local library. It is presently home to the local historical society. The building was listed on the National Register of Historic Places in 1980, and the New Hampshire State Register of Historic Places in 2006.

== Description and history ==
The Madison Corner School, District No. 1 is located in the village center of Madison, on the north side of NH 113, just west of the Madison Elementary School. It is a single-story wood-frame structure with a gabled roof, clapboarded exterior, and granite foundation. The building corners have simple pilasters, rising to entablatures running along the building sides. Its main facade faces south, and has two symmetrically placed entrances, each framed by simple moulding and topped by four-light transom windows. The interior has two small vestibules, which open into the single classroom. The walls are finished in painted wood.

The school was built in 1835, and was originally located about 0.5 miles (0.80 km) west of the present location. In early decades it was a frequent site of town meetings, owing to its central location. It was moved near its present location in 1873, at which time its window arrangements were altered to improve interior lighting. The building was converted for use as the town library in 1951, and was moved to its present location in 1980 to make way for an addition to the adjacent school building (now the Madison Elementary School). The building was used by the elementary school for music classes and a yearly week where third graders would do themed activities meant to emulate what students may have done during the school house's construction.

== See also ==
- National Register of Historic Places listings in Carroll County, New Hampshire
