= E. E. Cummings House =

United States historic place

- U.S. National Register of Historic Places
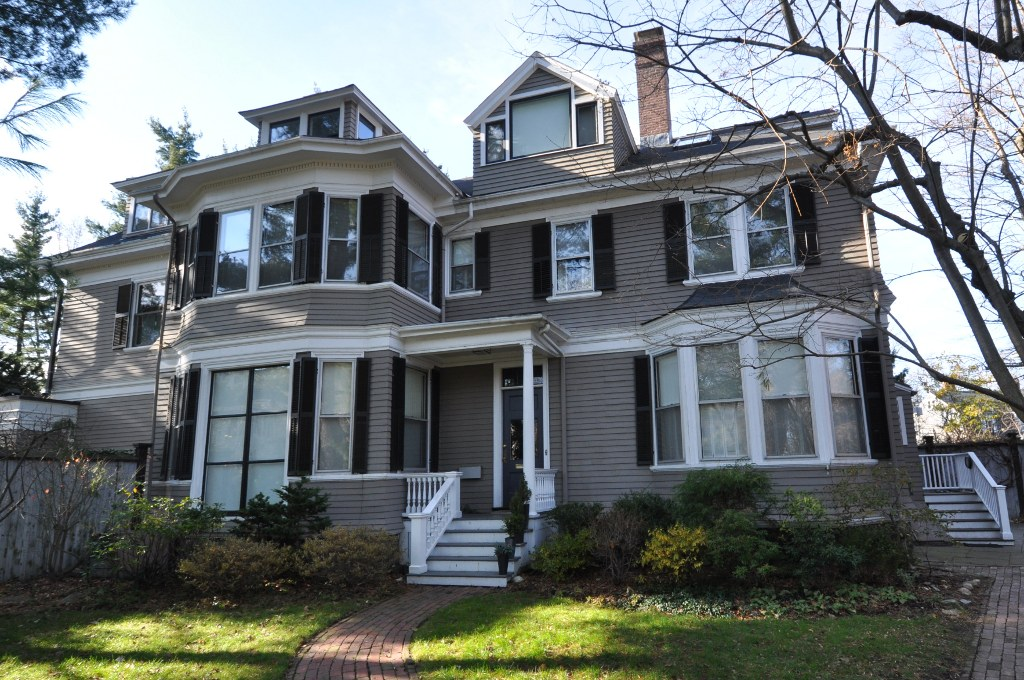

- Location within Massachusetts Location within the United States
- Location: Cambridge, Massachusetts
- Coordinates: 42°22′43.6″N 71°6′38.5″W
- Built: 1893
- Architect: Walker & Kimball
- Architectural style: Colonial Revival
- MPS: Cambridge MRA
- NRHP reference No.: 83000796
- Added to NRHP: June 30, 1983

The E. E. Cummings House is an historic house at 104 Irving Street in Cambridge, Massachusetts. The house was the childhood home of author and poet E. E. Cummings. The Colonial Revival house was built in 1893 for Cummings' parents, and was listed on the National Register of Historic Places in 1983.

== Description and history ==
The Cummings house is set on a roughly triangular parcel formed by the junction of Irving and Scott Streets in the Shady Hill neighborhood east of Harvard University. It is a 2 1/2-story wood-frame structure with Colonial Revival massing and features. It has a projecting dentillated cornice below the gabled roof, and a porch supported by Tuscan columns. There is a projecting bay section at the center of the main facade to the left of the entry, and a single-story bay to its right. Windows are generally 1-over-1 sash, and the front entrance door is topped by a multilight transom window. Dormers of varying style project from the main roof.

The house was designed by Walker and Kimball for Edward E. Cummings, a professor at Harvard and a local pastor, and was built in 1893. Cummings's son, the poet E. E. Cummings, was born here the following year, and lived here until he graduated from Harvard (BA 1915, MA 1917), and moved to New York City. Cummings described the house in his six nonlectures: "My own home faced the Cambridge world as a finely and solidly constructed mansion, preceded by a large oval lawn and ringed with an imposing white-pine hedge," and "The big Cambridge house was in this respect, as in all other respects, a true home."

== See also ==
- Joy Farm, the poet's summer house in New Hampshire, now a National Historic Landmark
- National Register of Historic Places listings in Cambridge, Massachusetts
