= River des Peres =

River in St. Louis, Missouri

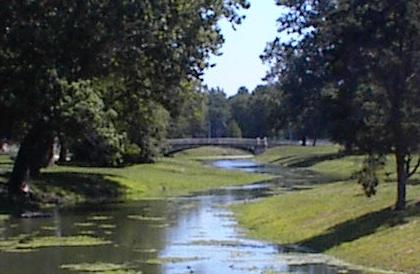
The "River des Peres" in Forest Park. This is not the actual river (which flows in a concrete pipe underneath) but rather is a waterscape created with the city's water supply

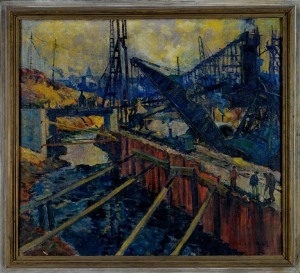
Thomas P. Barnett painting Construction of the River des Peres Channel in Forest Park

The River des Peres (French: rivière des Pères) (English: /dʌˈpɛər/) is a 9.3-mile (15.0 km) metropolitan river in St. Louis, Missouri. It is the backbone of sanitary and storm water systems in the city of St. Louis and portions of St. Louis County. Its largest tributaries are Deer Creek and Gravois Creek. At St. Louis, the river has a mean annual discharge of 79 cubic feet per second.

== Location ==
Mouth
Confluence with the Mississippi River near River City Casino, St. Louis: 38°31′59″N 90°15′38″W
Source
Creve Coeur, Missouri: 38°40′43″N 90°24′12″W The River Des Peres is sourced by Lake Sherwood in Overland, MO, a man-made, spring-sourced lake.

== History ==
The name, meaning "River of the Fathers", is of French origin, and was given by locals because a mission of Jesuit Catholic priests resided near the confluence of the river with the Mississippi in the early 1700s. In the late 1600s, a group of Kaskaskias Indians crossed the Mississippi and established a settlement near the river's confluence with the Mississippi. In 1702, French missionaries, following French practice, established their own settlement adjacent to the Kaskaskia's settlement. The French settlement, like others in the region, was dedicated to missionary work and trade with Native Americans. In 1703, the Kaskaskia abandoned their settlement; the following year, the French traders and priests followed. There is also a city of the same name, Des Peres, located in west St. Louis County.

In preparation for the 1904 World's Fair, the portion of the river that flows through Forest Park was disguised by temporary wooden channels. Shortly thereafter, that portion was placed entirely underground.

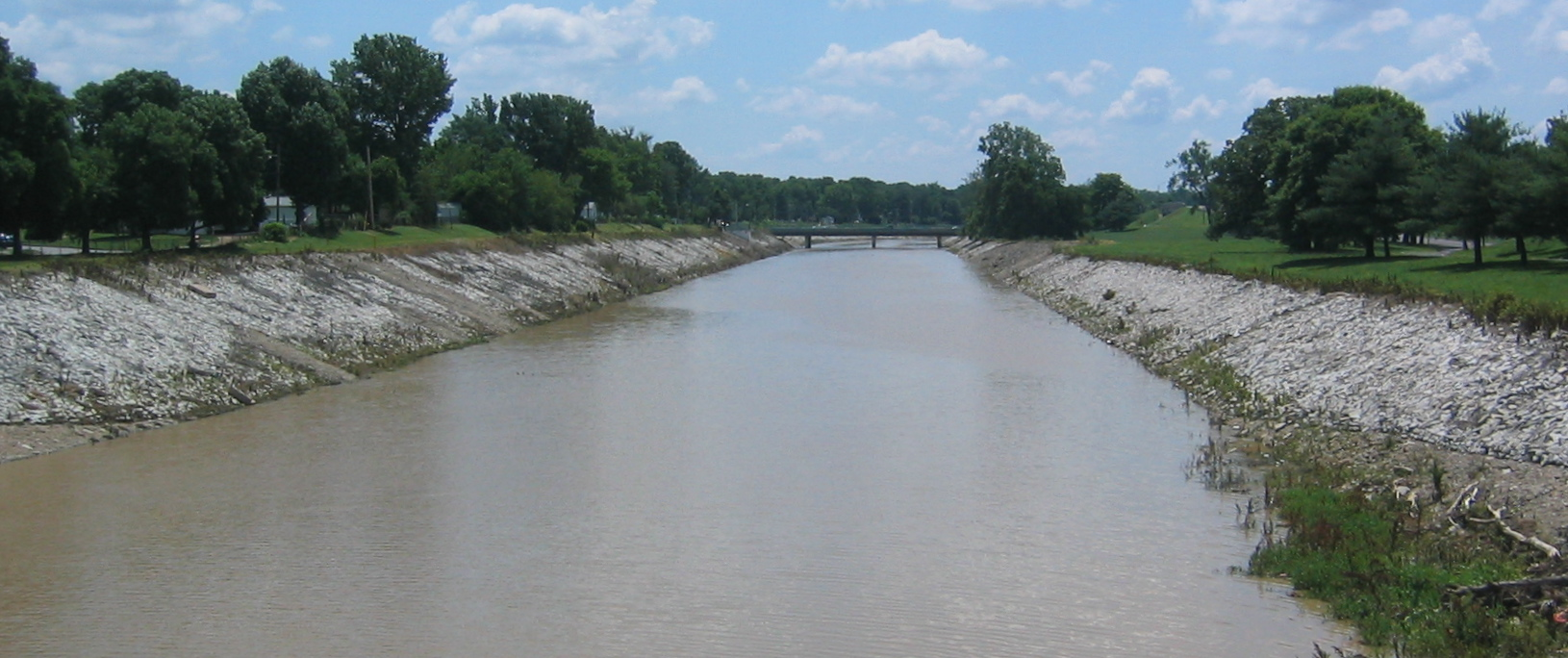
The southern stretch of River des Peres as seen from Lansdowne Ave. looking east

The River des Peres has functioned as a combined sanitary sewer and storm drain for over 100 years. In the early 1930s, following high demand for preventive safety measures brought on by a series of fatal floods, the river was channelized, with its upper sections redirected underground in large sewage pipes. Design and construction was led by the United States Army Corps of Engineers, Horner & Shifrin, and the Works Progress Administration. The lower banks of the river, most notably along Willmore Park and the River des Peres Greenway, were lined with quarried limestone, producing a distinct, lasting landmark. "Safety First / W.P.A." is written in mosaics along the eastern banks. This southern length of the river now has a sewer beneath it, and fills only as a result of heavy rains.

In 1988, the American Society of Civil Engineers designated the River des Peres Sewage & Drainage Works as a National Historic Civil Engineering Landmark for the calculations involved, the large-scale trench dewatering methods, and the soil stabilization procedures.

Some of the worst flooding of the Great Flood of 1993 occurred near where the river flows into the Mississippi River.

== Current condition ==
River des Peres enters underground culverts from north of Forest Park, emerges south of the park into concrete channels, and debouches into the Mississippi.

An artificial water flow that emulates the river was created through Forest Park, using the city's water supply. This is often mistakenly considered a re-creation of the original River des Peres. However, the water flow here is deliberately produced, not derived from rainfall, or runoff, etc., and cannot be considered a re-creation of the river. The resemblance of the water feature to a picturesque river scene was an attempt to maintain continuity with the appearance of the rest of Forest Park's landscape, which for the most part, excepting significantly recent additions to the Art Museum (by Peter Walker), upholds the original, early twentieth century pastoral design intentions of George Kessler. The design received notable objections due to its generous use of resources to present the appearance of a healthy river.

The river is currently part of the combined sewer and stormwater system of its watershed, which includes large portions of St. Louis City and County. It is administered by the St. Louis Metropolitan Sewer District (MSD), which concerns itself primarily with sanitary and storm water management; and the United States Army Corps of Engineers, which handles general flood and safety concerns. MSD is working to separate the sanitary and stormwater systems, which will enable more recreational use of the river.

Great Rivers Greenway is developing the River Ring, an interconnected system of greenways, parks and trails that links three counties, joins two states, and covers an area of 1,216 square mile. The River des Peres Greenway is part of River Ring (9.9 miles long now) and links together multiple parks and green spaces including Francis R. Slay Park, Fultz Field, Old St. Marcus Cemetery and the Christy Greenway.

== See also ==
- List of Missouri rivers
