= Joy Farm =

United States historic place

- U.S. National Register of Historic Places
- U.S. National Historic Landmark
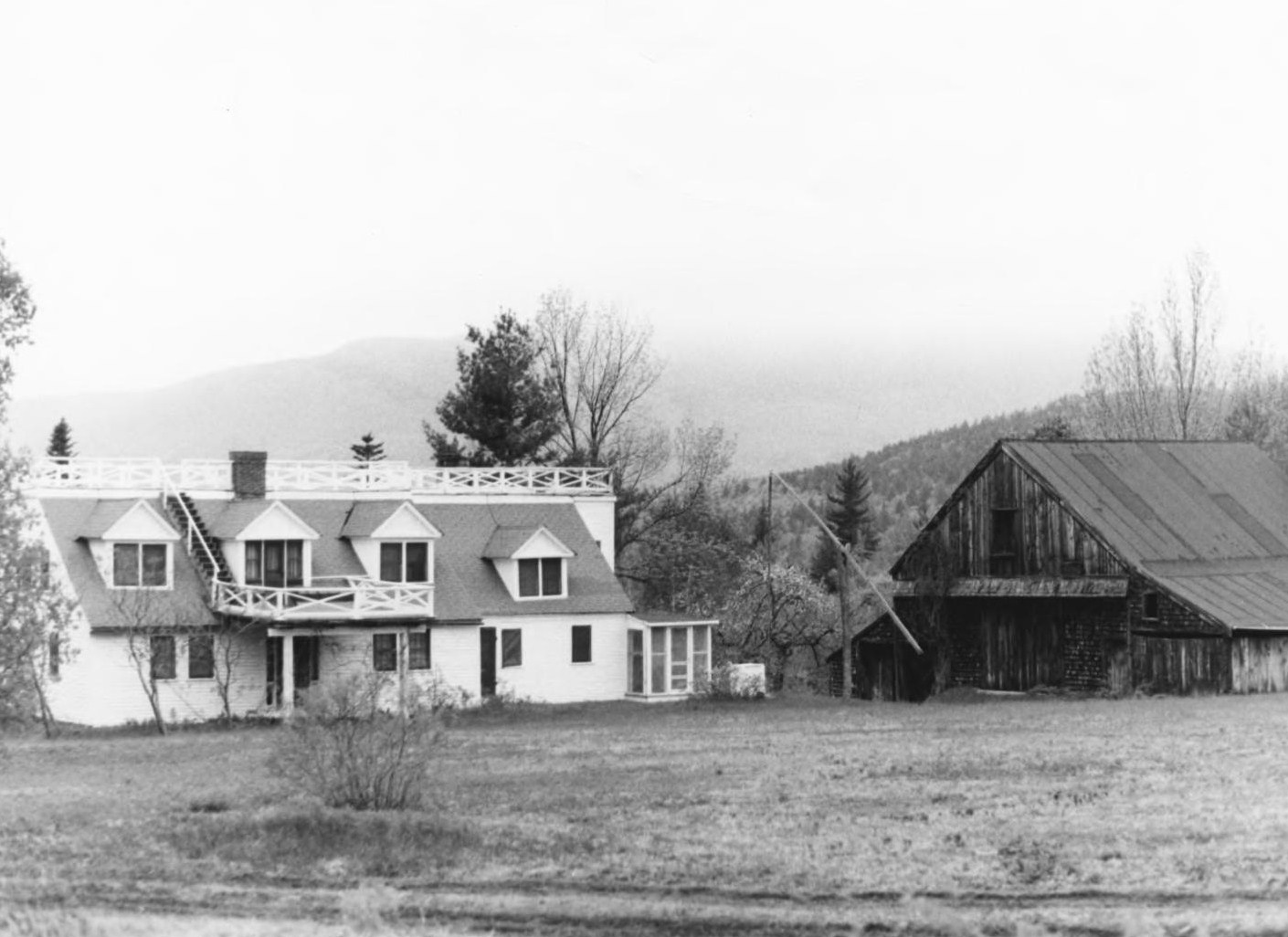
- Joy Farm in 1971

- Location within New Hampshire Location within the United States
- Location: Silver Lake, New Hampshire (town of Madison)
- Coordinates: 43°54′56″N 71°11′1″W
- NRHP reference No.: 71000048

Significant dates
- Added to NRHP: November 11, 1971
- Designated NHL: November 11, 1971

Joy Farm, also known as the E. E. Cummings House, is a historic farmstead on Joy Farm Road in the Silver Lake part of Madison, New Hampshire. It was designated a National Historic Landmark in 1971 in recognition for its place as the longtime summer home of poet E. E. Cummings (1894–1962).

Cummings's parents purchased the farm, which is located near Silver Lake, in 1899 from Ephraim Joy. His mother deeded him the farm in 1929, and he spent time there every summer until his death in 1962. He was at the farm in September 1962 when he had a stroke; he died at the hospital in North Conway the next day.

The property includes a house and barn, as well as a small, two-story octagonal tower. The main house is a 1 1/2-story building consisting of four bays, of which the rightmost is set back. The house has a side-gable roof, which has been modified to accommodate a deck above the rear half. The front of the main block has five bays on the first level, with paired sash windows flanking a center entry. The entry has sidelight windows, and is sheltered by a porch deck that is accessible from the middle gable of three gable dormers that line the main block's upper level. This deck, like that above the rear of the house, is lined with a railing consisting of posts connected by top rails and lower rails forming an X. The barn stands just north of the house.

== See also ==
- E. E. Cummings House in Cambridge, Massachusetts
- List of National Historic Landmarks in New Hampshire
- National Register of Historic Places listings in Carroll County, New Hampshire
