= Cottonwood Creek (Cimarron River tributary) =

Tributary of the Cimarron River in Central Oklahoma

- Cottonwood Creek

- Location of mouth

Location
- Country: United States
- State: Oklahoma

Physical characteristics
- Mouth
  - coordinates: 35.90411°N 97.44492°W
- Length: approx. 30 miles
- Discharge
  - average: 10322

Cottonwood Creek is a stream in Oklahoma that flows from rural Canadian County through portions of Logan County until it reaches its mouth at the Cimarron River, northwest of Guthrie.

Significant tributaries of Cottonwood Creek include Chisholm Creek and Deer Creek. Its source is located in rural Canadian County northwest of the city of Piedmont. The stream drains about320 square miles.

The creek has often caused flooding in Guthrie. It is also the namesake of the Cottonwood Flats festival grounds in Guthrie.

== Historic flood levels ==
Record flood crest levels of Cottonwood Creek at Guthrie
Crest level in feet	Date
30.00	10/20/1983
29.60	05/09/1993
29.26	10/02/1959
28.58	05/15/1949
28.09	09/21/1965
27.90	05/28/1987
27.90	06/09/1995
27.40	05/22/2019
27.40	06/01/2013
27.20	09/13/1989
