= Eidelweiss, New Hampshire =

Unincorporated community in New Hampshire, United States

- Village district
- Entrance sign to the community
- Nickname: VDOE
- Location within New Hampshire Location within the United States
- Coordinates: 43°56′24″N 71°07′48″W
- Country: United States
- State: New Hampshire
- County: Carroll
- Town: Madison
- Elevation: 673 ft (205 m)
- Time zone: UTC-5 (Eastern)
  - Summer (DST): UTC-4 (Eastern)
- ZIP code: 03849 (Madison)
- Area code: 603
- Website: www.vdoe-nh.org

Eidelweiss is a village district in the town of Madison, Carroll County, New Hampshire, United States. It comprises a residential area in the northeastern part of Madison, surrounding three water bodies: Pea Porridge Pond, Middle Pea Porridge Pond, and Little Pea Porridge Pond. The village district is bordered to the west by New Hampshire Route 113, which leads south to the center of Madison and north into Conway.
