= Linwood, West Virginia =

- Unincorporated community
- Location within West Virginia Location within the United States
- Coordinates: 38°25′15″N 80°02′38″W
- Country: United States
- State: West Virginia
- County: Pocahontas
- Elevation: 2,949 ft (899 m)
- Time zone: UTC-5 (Eastern (EST))
  - Summer (DST): UTC-4 (EDT)
- Area codes: 304 & 681
- GNIS feature ID: 1551823

Linwood is an unincorporated community in Pocahontas County, West Virginia, United States. Linwood is located at the junction of U.S. Route 219 and state routes 55 and 66, 14 miles (23 km) north-northeast of Marlinton.

The community most likely was named for linden trees near the original town site.
