= Silver Lake Railroad =

Coordinates: 43°53′17″N 71°10′31″W

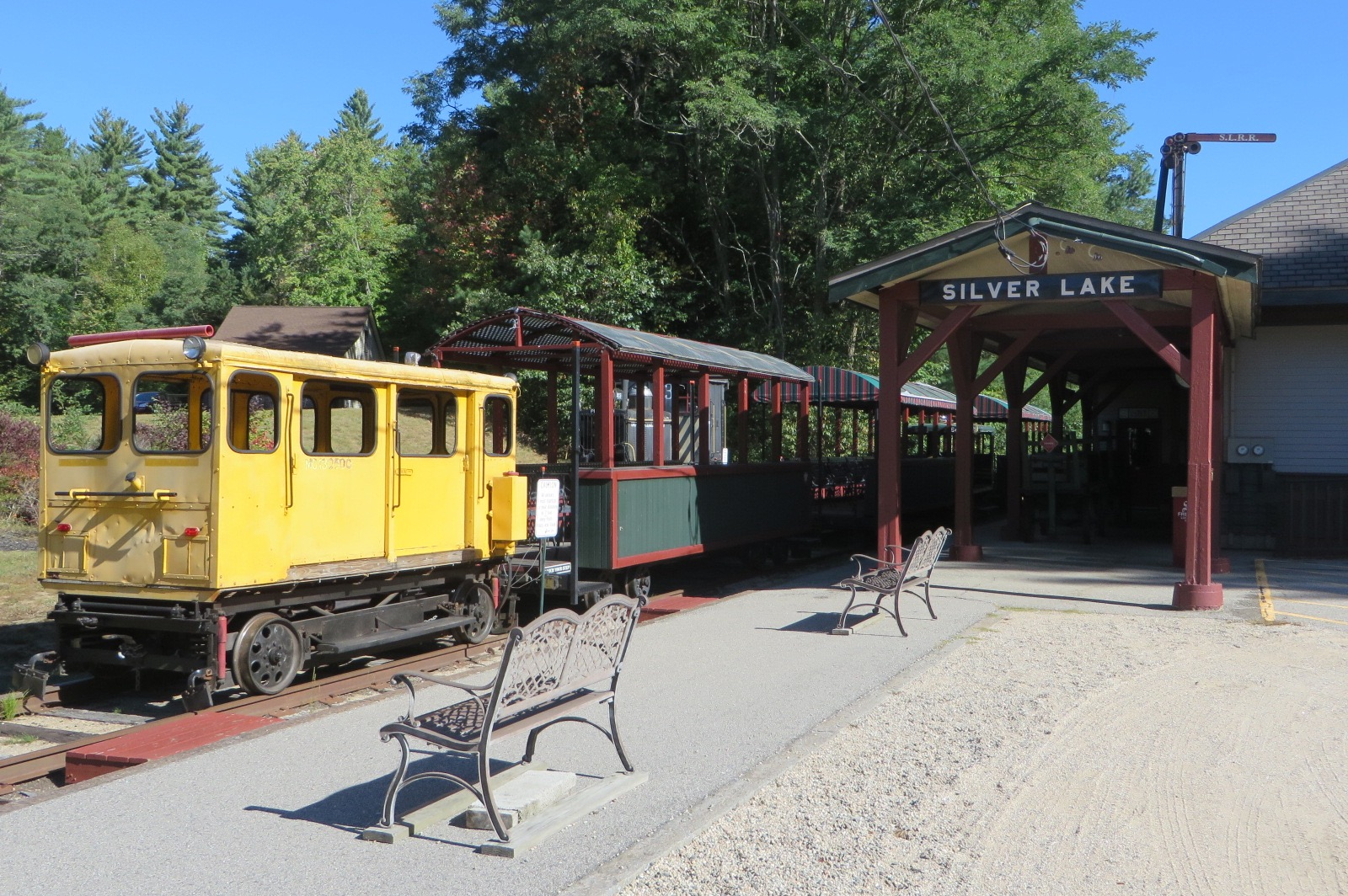
- Silver Lake RR in village of Silver Lake, New Hampshire

Overview
- Headquarters: Silver Lake, New Hampshire
- Locale: Madison, New Hampshire
- Dates of operation: 2007–2025
- Predecessor: Boston and Maine Railroad

Technical
- Length: 3 mi (4.8 km)

The Silver Lake Railroad is a heritage railway located in Madison, New Hampshire, USA.

== History ==
Founded and owned by Neil Underwood, Silver Lake Railroad opened on July 7, 2007, operating from Madison Station (aka Silver Lake Depot) in the town of Madison. This station was a stop for the Boston and Maine Railroad from 1872 until passenger service ended on the line in 1961.

The station has been restored over the period from 2002–2007, and much of its original features are intact. The original order boards and stationmaster office were undisturbed, as well as the interior of the station (now housing the Silver Lake post office), which displays its original varnished woodwork.

From 2007 to 2017, the railroad ran trackcar train excursions using Fairmont A cars and custom built coaches.

As of September 2025, the railroad now offers railbike excursions known as "Silver Lake Railriders".

== Equipment ==
Silver Lake Railroad's rolling and display stock currently at the station:

- 1917 H. K. Porter, Inc 0-4-0 steam engine
- Plymouth 24-ton locomotive
- Vulcan 10-ton locomotive
- Midsize Plymouth locomotive
- Fairmont A8 Gang Car
- Three Fairmont A6 gang cars (used for power cars)
- Fairmont S2 railcar
- Fairmont railcar converted to small trolley
- Three 24-foot (7.3 m) open passenger cars
- Boston and Maine and Union Pacific baggage carts
- a 1941 Sterling Diner

== Route ==
The railroad operated on the historic Conway Branch (abandoned in October 1972), traveling northward past a chain of ponds in Madison, New Hampshire to a crossing south of Conway. Rides are approximately 40 minutes, aboard two 24-foot-long (7.3 m) open-air passenger cars powered by a Fairmont A6 railcar.

The line passes a series of lily ponds and beaver ponds which have beaver lodges and dams in them. Scenery includes the Mt. Washington Valley and views of the White Mountains. Wildlife that can be seen along the line include but are not limited to moose, bears, deer, and birds.

== See also ==
- Miniature Train at Silver Lake (Ohio)
