= Chisholm Creek (stream in Oklahoma) =

Tributary of the Cottonwood Creek in Central Oklahoma

- Location of mouth

Location
- Country: United States
- State: Oklahoma

Physical characteristics
- Mouth
  - coordinates: 35.78736749083222°N 97.52286138922759°W

ChisholmCreek is a stream that flows northward from its source in The Village, Oklahoma, through parts of northern Oklahoma City, and through the City of Edmond and finally where it joins with Cottonwood Creek in rural Logan County near the community of Seward, Oklahoma. The creek passes through Oklahoma County and Logan County, Most of the creeks runs freely, but portions of it have been channelized, including one stretch of about 1500 feet that goes underneat the parking lot of a Walmart Super Center.

The Chisholm Creek Shopping Center (located 1/2 mile East of the Creek) is named after the creek.

Portions of Chisholm Creek are reported to be polluted with excess bacteria, nitrogen, and phosphorus and is listed as a "303(d) impaired waterway under the provisions of the Clean Water Act
