= Silver Lake (Madison, New Hampshire) =

Lake in Madison, New Hampshire, United States

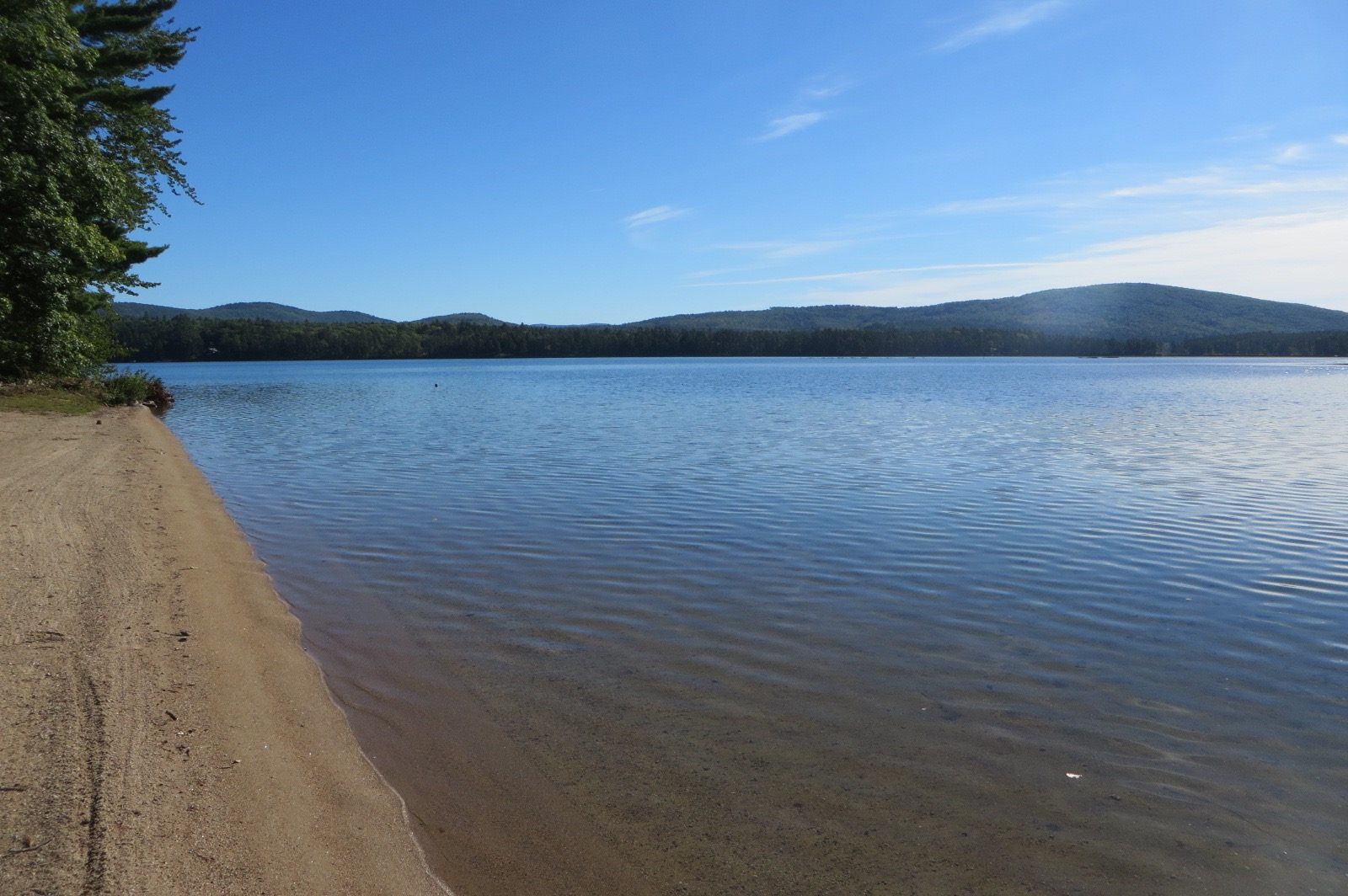
- Silver Lake at Nichols Beach, Madison, NH

- Location within New Hampshire Location within the United States
- Location: Carroll County, New Hampshire
- Coordinates: 43°51′57″N 71°10′24″W
- Primary inflows: Deer River; Forrest Brook
- Primary outflows: West Branch
- Basin countries: United States
- Max. length: 2.6 mi (4.2 km)
- Max. width: 1.2 mi (1.9 km)
- Surface area: 969 acres (3.92 km^{2})
- Average depth: 47 ft (14 m)
- Max. depth: 164 ft (50 m)
- Surface elevation: 468 ft (143 m)
- Islands: Big Island; Bimba Island; Loon Island
- Settlements: Silver Lake (town of Madison)

Silver Lake is a 969-acre (3.92 km^{2}) water body located in Carroll County in eastern New Hampshire, United States, in the town of Madison. The village of Silver Lake within Madison lies at the north end of the lake. Water from Silver Lake flows via the West Branch, through the Ossipee Pine Barrens to Ossipee Lake and ultimately to the Saco River in Maine.

Much of the lake's perimeter is forested, but there are numerous swimming spots. Popular beaches include "the foot" of the lake, "Nichols Beach", and "the head of the lake." It was the summer home of E. E. Cummings whose father had built two houses on the lake's eastern shore and later purchased the nearby Joy Farm where Cummings' spent most of his summers as well as his final days.

The lake is classified as a cold- and warmwater fishery, with observed species including rainbow trout, lake trout, lake whitefish, smallmouth bass, chain pickerel, and horned pout.

== See also ==
- List of lakes in New Hampshire
