= Deer Creek (Des Moines River tributary) =

Stream in Webster and Humboldt County, Iowa, U.S.

Coordinates: 42.600248°N 94.225241°W

Deer Creek is a stream in Iowa, United States, flowing through Webster and Humboldt counties. It is a tributary of the Des Moines River.

Deer Creek was so named from the fact that the surrounding area was a hunting ground of deer.

== See also ==
- List of rivers of Iowa
