= Deer Creek (Butler Creek tributary) =

Stream in the US states of Arkansas and Missouri

Deer Creek is a stream in northwestern Benton County, Arkansas and southwestern McDonald County, Missouri. It is a tributary of Butler Creek.

The stream headwaters are in Arkansas east-northeast of Sulphur Springs at an elevation of about 1,200 feet (370 m) (36°29′24″N 94°24′07″W). The stream flows to the west northwest for approximately 4.5 miles to its confluence with Butler Creek. The confluence is at an elevation of 860 feet (260 m) (36°30′32″N 94°28′48″W).

Deer Creek was named for the numerous deer along its course.

== See also ==
- List of rivers of Arkansas
- List of rivers of Missouri
