= Deer Creek Public Schools =

School district in Oklahoma, U.S.

Coordinates: 35.682642°N 97.624243°W

District information
- Type: Public
- Grades: Pre-K - 12
- Established: 1926
- Superintendent: Jason Perez
- School board: 5 members
- Schools: 10

Students and staff
- Students: 8,200+ (July 1, 2026)
- Teachers: 548
- District mascot: Archie the Antler
- Colors: Navy Blue, White, Black

Other information
- Website: www.deercreekschools.org

Deer Creek Public Schools serves students in northwestern Oklahoma County and southwestern Logan County in Oklahoma. As of July 2026, the district enrolls over 8,200 students.

There are ten schools in the district: Deer Creek High School, Deer Creek Middle School, Central Creek Middle School, Deer Creek Intermediate School, Deer Creek Knight Ridge Elementary School, Deer Creek Elementary School, Prairie Vale Elementary School, Rose Union Elementary School, Grove Valley Elementary School, and Spring Creek Elementary School.

== History ==
Deer Creek Public Schools was established in 1920. Deer Creek is a growing community sprawling over the border between Oklahoma County and Logan County. It is named for the nearby Deer Creek, which snakes through much of the district and occasionally causes the schools to close by flooding during times of heavy rains.

This region of Oklahoma was part of the Unassigned Lands and was settled during the Oklahoma Land Run of 1889. Before the land run began, the area was surveyed into sections by the federal Public Land Survey System, with each section measuring one mile (1.6 km) by one mile, and divided evenly into 160-acre (0.65 km^{2}) homesteads, called quarter-sections. Sections were organized into larger entities, called townships, that consisted of 36 numbered sections. Following a pattern set during the settling of the Northwest Territories in 1787, the Organic Act dedicated section No. 16 for the support of public schools. In the Deer Creek Public School District, both northern quarters and the southwestern quarter were sold to raise funds to build the school. The first school was built on the southeast quarter-section, at what is now called N. MacArthur Boulevard and W. 206th Street in the unincorporated part of Oklahoma County.

During the Great Depression, the federal Works Project Administration built a one-story, red-brick school at the far southeastern corner of this quarter-section. This building included a half-court basketball gymnasium, about a dozen classrooms, and a small library. A gymnasium and separate cafeteria were added later. The buildings have since been demolished, but the trees that surrounded the building are still present, and part of the building's brick façade is used on the entrance to the high school's auditorium.

== Boundary ==
Within Oklahoma County, the district includes parts of Edmond and Oklahoma City. The district extends into Logan County, in which Guthrie extends into it. Additionally, it extends into Canadian County.

== Schools ==
Since the early 1980s, the district has expanded considerably due to exurban sprawl. It now has five elementary schools, none of which are at the original location. Prairie Vale Elementary School was the first school built away from the original site. It is near the western border of the City of Edmond and on the border of northwest Oklahoma City. Deer Creek Elementary moved several miles south and serves primarily students living in the Memorial and MacArthur area of Oklahoma City. Rose Union is one mile (1.6 km) northeast of the original site and draws students from the largest section of the school district. Grove Valley covers the NW 192nd and Portland (Highway 74) area. In the 2008–2009 school year, the four elementary schools enrolled a total of 1,850 students in grades pre-K through 5. A fifth elementary, Spring Creek Elementary, opened in August 2013 and is located off of Rockwell and 150th.

=== High School ===
- Deer Creek High School

Deer Creek High School (DCHS) is located in northern Oklahoma County, Oklahoma, north of Oklahoma City and west of Edmond on the northwest corner of NW 206th Street and MacArthur Boulevard. The high school has dramatically expanded over the past half-decade. The high school facilities include a two-story annex, a freshman academy, Alumni Hall, the old gym, a PAAC (Performing Arts & Athletic Center), a multi-sport complex, and a new football stadium.

=== Middle Schools ===
- Deer Creek Middle School(7th and 8th)
- Central Creek Middle School (7th and 8th)

=== Intermediate School ===
- Deer Creek Intermediate School(5th and 6th)

=== Elementary Schools ===
- Deer Creek Elementary School
- Grove Valley Elementary School
- Prairie Vale Elementary School
- Rose Union Elementary School
- Spring Creek Elementary School
- Knight Ridge Elementary School

== Awards ==
Deer Creek High School, Deer Creek Middle School, Deer Creek Elementary School, Grove Valley Elementary School, and Prairie Vale Elementary School are Blue Ribbon Schools.

== Sports ==
All schools in this district have the same mascot, the "Deer Creek Antlers".

== Construction ==
The current high school building began in the early 1980s as the two short arms (originally intended to form an X shape) that point northeast and southeast on the east face of the classroom building. Since then, it has been expanded several times, more than tripling its original size to accommodate the rapidly growing student body.

On February 8, 2022, two new bonds were approved that gave the district a total of $138,110,000. These bonds have been used to build the under construction Knight Ridge Elementary School and the new under construction Middle School. The bonds have also been used to expand the cafeterias and kitchens at Deer Creek and Prairie Vale Elementary School.
