= Deer Creek (Oklahoma) =

Tributary of the Cottonwood Creek in Central Oklahoma

- Deer Creek

- Location of mouth

Location
- Country: United States
- State: Oklahoma

Physical characteristics
- Mouth
  - coordinates: 35.770679°N 97.550131°W

Deer Creek is a stream that flows from rural Canadian County through portions of Oklahoma County and Logan County. It joins with Cottonwood Creek in rural Logan County near the community of Seward, Oklahoma. Cottonwood Creek continues on to join with the Cimarron River near Guthrie, Oklahoma. Like Cottonwood Creek, portions of Deer Creek are prone to flooding.

The most significant tributary of Deer Creek is Bluff Creek (and upstream to Lake Hefner, a major water reservoir and recreational lake in Oklahoma City.

Deer Creek Public Schools takes its name from the creek.

Most of the creek's path goes through the northern portions of the Oklahoma City metropolitan area.
