= Deer Creek (River des Peres tributary) =

Watercourse in St. Louis County, Missouri

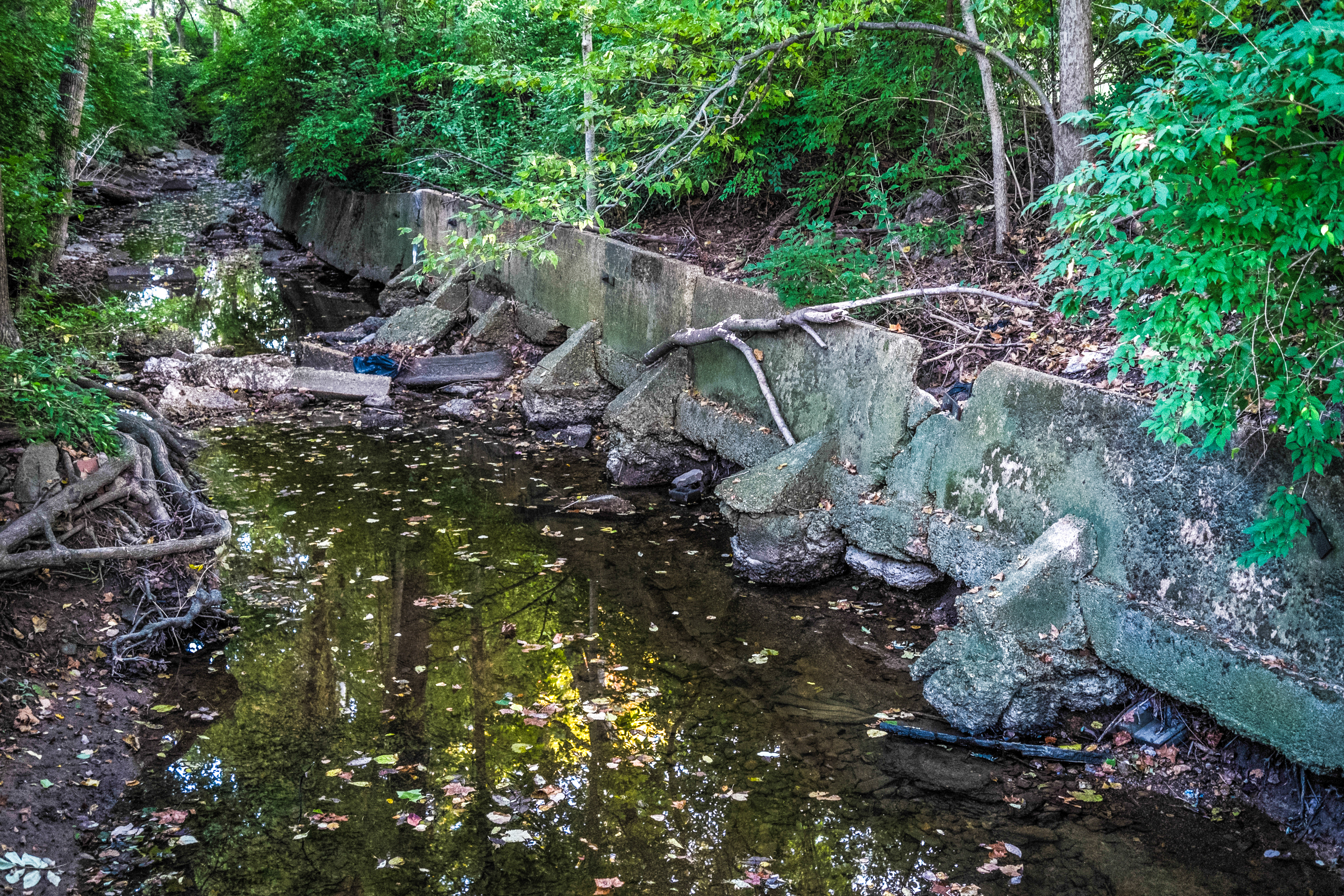
Deer Creek in Creve Coeur, Missouri

Deer Creek is a stream in St. Louis County the U.S. state of Missouri. It is a tributary of the River des Peres.

The stream headwaters arise at 38°40′05″N 90°26′16″W and it flows to the southeast to its confluence with the River des Peres at 38°36′00″N 90°18′57″W. just within the St. Louis city limits.

Deer Creek was so named due to the presence of deer in the area. Fourteen previously-unnamed tributary streams were named in 2010.

== Tributaries ==
- Magnolia Creek

== See also ==
- List of rivers of Missouri
