= Deer Creek (Big Creek, Ontario) =

Stream in Norfolk County, Ontario, Canada

Coordinates: 42°41′41″N 80°32′45″W

Deer Creek

Deer Creek is a tributary of Big Creek in Norfolk County, Ontario, Canada. It is one of the watercourses managed by the Long Point Region Conservation Authority (LPRCA). The LPRCA operates the 301-acre (122 ha) Deer Creek Conservation Authority.

Deer Creek was dammed in 1969, creating an 80-acre (32 ha) reservoir. The reservoir is in a forested area, and the Conservation Authority opened campsites, available for campers. Canoes can be rented. Fishing is allowed.
