= Deer Creek (North Fork Salt River tributary) =

Stream in Monroe County, Missouri

Coordinates: 39.6180953°N 91.9104449°W

Deer Creek is a stream in Monroe County in the U.S. state of Missouri. It is a tributary of the North Fork Salt River.

Deer Creek was so named on account of deer near its course.

== See also ==
- List of rivers of Missouri
