= Deer Creek (Neosho River tributary) =

Stream in Kansas, U.S.

Coordinates: 37.950868°N 95.442482°W

Deer Creek is a stream in Allen County, Kansas and Anderson County, Kansas, in the United States. It is a tributary of the Neosho River.

Deer Creek was named from an abundance of deer along its banks.

== See also ==
- List of rivers of Kansas
