= Deer River (Manitoba) =

- Location of the mouth of the river in Manitoba

Location
- Country: Canada
- Province: Manitoba
- Region: Northern
- Census division: 23

Physical characteristics
- Source: Unnamed lake
  - coordinates: 57°35′00″N 95°14′24″W
  - elevation: 226 m (741 ft)
- Mouth: Dog River
  - coordinates: 58°22′40″N 94°13′02″W
  - elevation: 25 m (82 ft)

Basin features
- River system: Hudson Bay drainage basin

The Deer River is a river in Census division 23 in Northern Manitoba, Canada. It is in the Hudson Bay drainage basin and is a right tributary of the Dog River.

== Course ==
The Deer River begins at an unnamed lake, just 6 kilometres (3.7 mi) east of the Churchill River and flows east, through the Deer Lakes, and continues east, reaching a maximum separation with the Churchill River of about 70 kilometres (43 mi). It then turns north, and is roughly paralleled for the rest of its course by the Hudson Bay Railway; it passes closest to the railway points on the line (each with a flag stop railway station) of M'Clintock, Chesnaye and Lamprey. The river reaches its mouth at the Dog River, just upstream of that river's mouth at the Churchill River. The Churchill River flows to Hudson Bay.

== Tributaries ==
- Lost Moose Creek (right)
- Clifford Smith Creek (left)
- Robert Thomson Creek (left)
