= Deer Creek (Shoal Creek tributary) =

Stream in the American state of Missouri

Coordinates: 39°40′38″N 94°13′12″W

Deer Creek is a stream in eastern Clinton County in the U.S. state of Missouri. It is a tributary to Shoal Creek.

Deer Creek most likely was named for the deer along its course.

== See also ==
- List of rivers of Missouri
