= Deer Creek (South Branch Galien River tributary) =

Stream in Berrien County, Michigan, U.S.

Coordinates: 41°47′04″N 86°40′05″W

Deer Creek is a stream in Berrien County, in the U.S. state of Michigan. It is a tributary to the South Branch Galien River.

Deer Creek was named for the abundance of deer along its course.
