= Silver Lake, New Hampshire =

Unincorporated community in New Hampshire, United States

- Unincorporated community
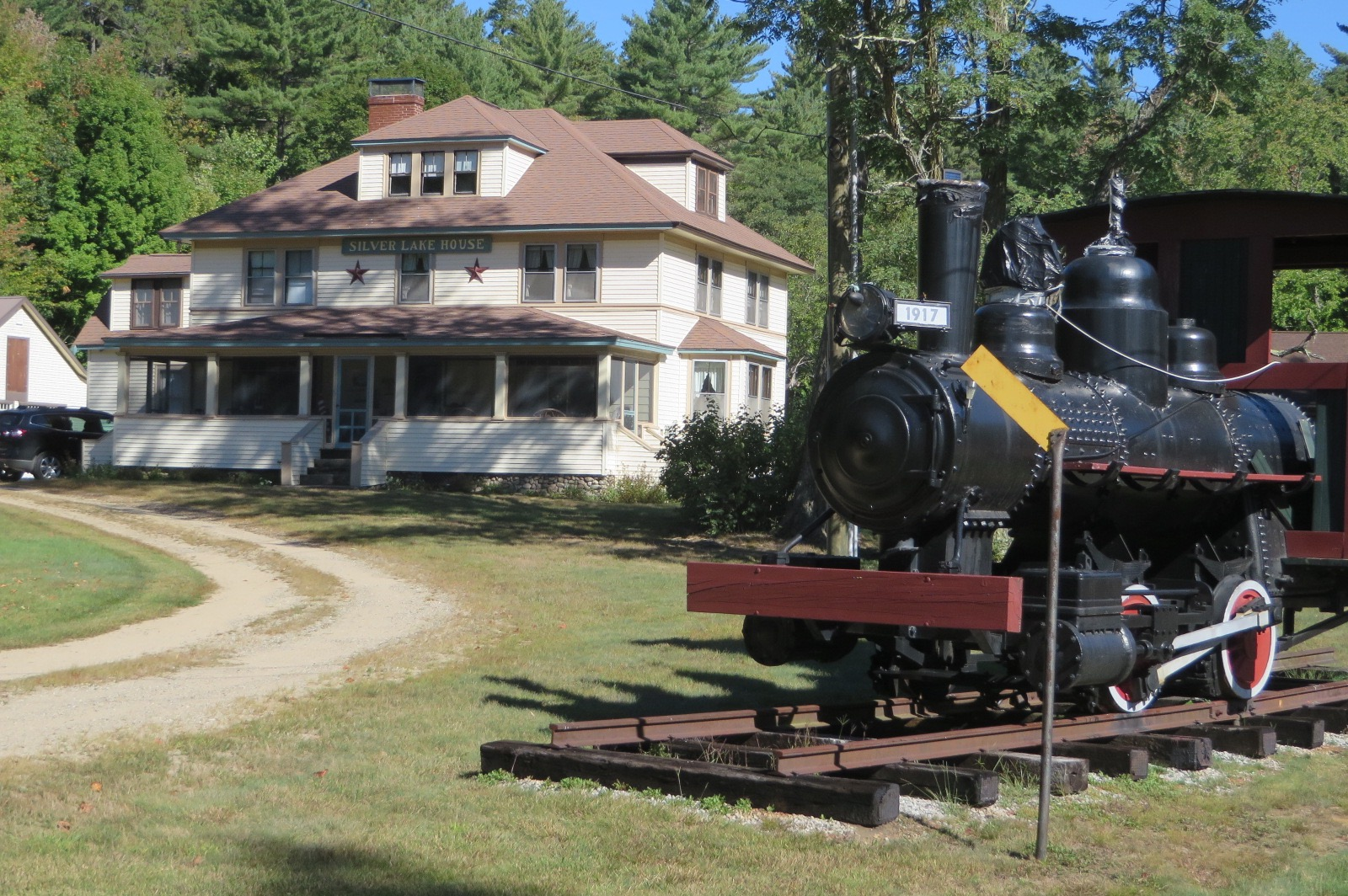
- Silver Lake Railroad at center of Silver Lake village

- Location within New Hampshire Location within the United States
- Coordinates: 43°53′17″N 71°10′31″W
- Country: United States
- State: New Hampshire
- County: Carroll
- Town: Madison
- Elevation: 486 ft (148 m)
- Time zone: UTC-5 (Eastern (EST))
  - Summer (DST): UTC-4 (EDT)
- ZIP code: 03875
- Area code: 603
- GNIS feature ID: 872665

Silver Lake is an unincorporated community located at the north end of Silver Lake in the town of Madison, New Hampshire, in Carroll County, New Hampshire, United States. Joy Farm, summer home of E. E. Cummings, is a National Historic Landmark located north of the village.

Silver Lake has a different ZIP code (03875) from the rest of the town of Madison.
