= Deer Creek, West Virginia =

Unincorporated community in West Virginia, United States

- Unincorporated community
- Location within West Virginia Location within the United States
- Coordinates: 38°23′11″N 79°55′30″W
- Country: United States
- State: West Virginia
- County: Pocahontas
- Elevation: 2,438 ft (743 m)
- Time zone: UTC-5 (Eastern (EST))
  - Summer (DST): UTC-4 (EDT)
- Area codes: 304 & 681
- GNIS feature ID: 1550898

Deer Creek is an unincorporated community in Pocahontas County, West Virginia, United States. Deer Creek is 14.5 miles (23.3 km) northeast of Marlinton.
