= Deer Creek Township =

Deer Creek Township may refer to:

== Illinois ==
- Deer Creek Township, Tazewell County, Illinois

== Indiana ==
- Deer Creek Township, Carroll County, Indiana
- Deer Creek Township, Cass County, Indiana
- Deer Creek Township, Miami County, Indiana

== Iowa ==
- Deer Creek Township, Mills County, Iowa
- Deer Creek Township, Webster County, Iowa
- Deer Creek Township, Worth County, Iowa

== Kansas ==
- Deer Creek Township, Allen County, Kansas
- Deer Creek Township, Phillips County, Kansas, in Phillips County, Kansas

== Minnesota ==
- Deer Creek Township, Otter Tail County, Minnesota

== Missouri ==
- Deer Creek Township, Bates County, Missouri
- Deer Creek Township, Henry County, Missouri

== Ohio ==
- Deer Creek Township, Madison County, Ohio
- Deer Creek Township, Pickaway County, Ohio

== Pennsylvania ==
- Deer Creek Township, Mercer County, Pennsylvania

== Wisconsin ==
- Deer Creek, Taylor County, Wisconsin
- Deer Creek, Outagamie County, Wisconsin
