= Madison, New Hampshire =

- Town
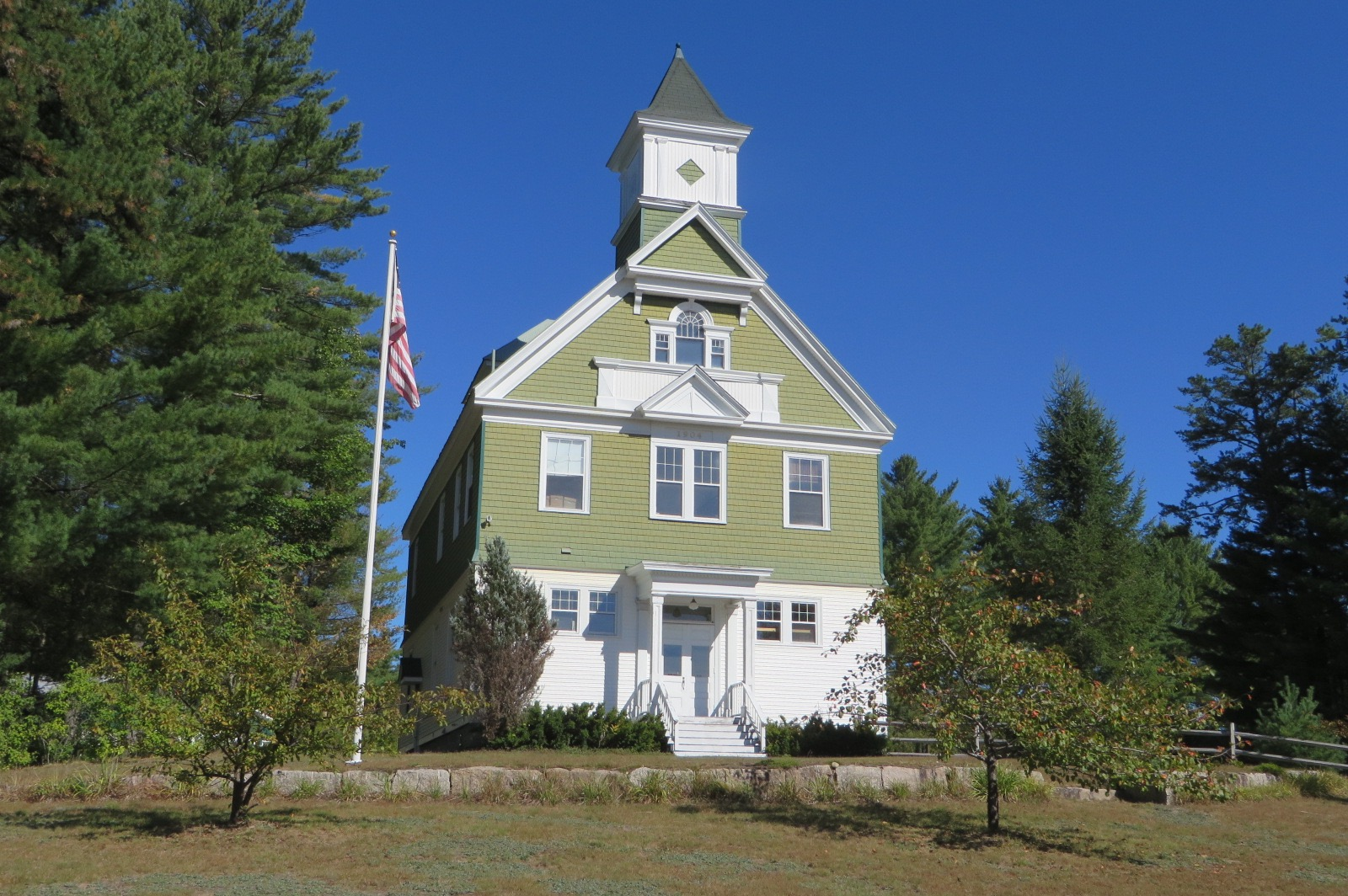
- Madison Town Hall

- Seal

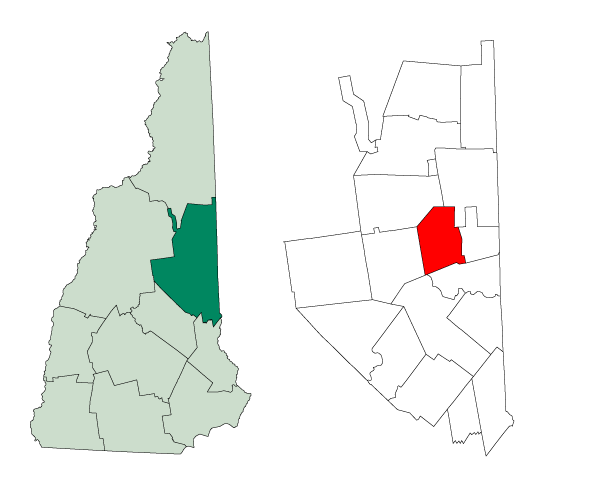
- Location in Carroll County, New Hampshire
- Coordinates: 43°53′57″N 71°09′01″W
- Country: United States
- State: New Hampshire
- County: Carroll
- Incorporated: 1852
- Villages: Madison; East Madison; Eidelweiss; Silver Lake

Area
  - Total: 40.9 sq mi (105.9 km^{2})
  - Land: 38.5 sq mi (99.7 km^{2})
  - Water: 2.4 sq mi (6.2 km^{2}) 5.84%
- Elevation: 564 ft (172 m)

Population (2020)
  - Total: 2,565
  - Density: 67/sq mi (25.7/km^{2})
- Time zone: UTC−5 (Eastern)
  - Summer (DST): UTC−4 (Eastern)
- ZIP codes: 03849 (Madison); 03875 (Silver Lake); 03818 (Conway)
- Area code: 603
- FIPS code: 33-45060
- GNIS feature ID: 873657
- Website: www.madison-nh.org

Madison is a town in Carroll County, New Hampshire, United States. The population was 2,565 at the 2020 census and an estimated 2,728 in 2025. Madison includes the village of Silver Lake and the village district of Eidelweiss.

== History ==
The area was one of the first to have land grants set aside for soldiers who had served in the French and Indian War. The land covered by these grants, parts of Eaton and Albany, was incorporated in 1852 as "Madison", named in honor of President James Madison, who was born 100 years earlier.

== Geography ==
According to the United States Census Bureau, the town has a total area of 40.9 square miles (105.9 km^{2}), of which 38.5 square miles (99.7 km^{2}) are land and 2.4 square miles (6.2 km^{2}) are water, comprising 5.84% of the town.

Madison is drained by Forrest Brook and Silver Lake to the south and by Pequawket Brook to the north. The entire town is part of the Saco River watershed. The highest point in Madison is the summit of Lyman Mountain in the eastern part of the town, at 1,558 feet (475 m) above sea level.

=== Adjacent municipalities ===
- Conway (northeast)
- Eaton (east)
- Freedom (southeast)
- Ossipee (south)
- Tamworth (west)
- Albany (northwest)

== Demographics ==
Historical population
Census	Pop.	Note	%±
1860	826		—
1870	646		−21.8%
1880	586		−9.3%
1890	554		−5.5%
1900	529		−4.5%
1910	507		−4.2%
1920	482		−4.9%
1930	535		11.0%
1940	512		−4.3%
1950	486		−5.1%
1960	429		−11.7%
1970	572		33.3%
1980	1,051		83.7%
1990	1,704		62.1%
2000	1,984		16.4%
2010	2,502		26.1%
2020	2,565		2.5%
2024 (est.)	2,725		6.2%
U.S. Decennial Census

As of the census of 2000, there were 1,984 people, 777 households, and 560 families residing in the town. The population density was 51.2 inhabitants per square mile (19.8/km^{2}). There were 1,589 housing units at an average density of 41.0 per square mile (15.8/km^{2}). The racial makeup of the town was 97.78% White, 0.05% African American, 0.66% Native American, 0.20% Asian, 0.40% from other races, and 0.91% from two or more races. Hispanic or Latino of any race were 0.76% of the population.

There were 777 households, out of which 33.1% had children under the age of 18 living with them, 60.0% were married couples living together, 7.2% had a female householder with no husband present, and 27.9% were non-families. 21.5% of all households were made up of individuals, and 7.9% had someone living alone who was 65 years of age or older. The average household size was 2.55 and the average family size was 2.97.

In the town, the population was spread out, with 24.8% under the age of 18, 5.4% from 18 to 24, 31.1% from 25 to 44, 26.6% from 45 to 64, and 12.0% who were 65 years of age or older. The median age was 40 years. For every 100 females, there were 104.3 males. For every 100 females age 18 and over, there were 99.2 males.

The median income for a household in the town was $43,523, and the median income for a family was $51,080. Males had a median income of $32,422 versus $22,159 for females. The per capita income for the town was $20,608. About 2.0% of families and 4.5% of the population were below the poverty line, including 5.2% of those under age 18 and 3.8% of those age 65 or over.

== Sites of interest ==
- Joy Farm, home of poet E. E. Cummings
- King Pine Ski Area at Purity Spring Resort
- Madison School, District No. 1, now used by the Madison Historical Society
- Silver Lake Railroad

=== Madison Boulder Natural Area ===
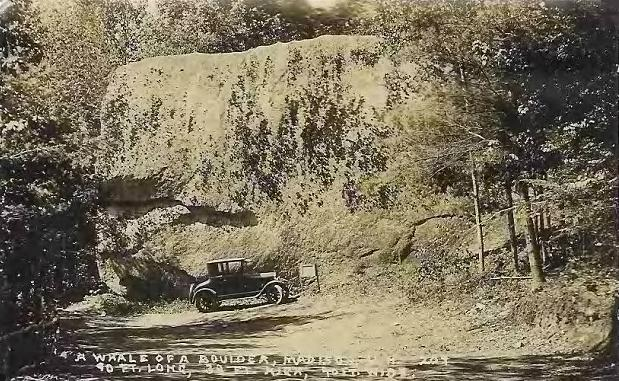
Madison Boulder c. 1922

The town is home to the Madison Boulder (43°55′52″N 71°10′04″W), the largest known glacial erratic in New England and among the largest in the world. Madison Boulder is a huge granite rock measuring 83 feet (25 m) in length, 23 feet (7.0 m) in height above the ground, and 37 feet (11 m) in width. It weighs upwards of 5,000 tons. A part of this roughly rectangular block is buried, probably to a depth of ten to twelve feet. It is located at Madison Boulder Natural Area in the northwest part of town. In 1970, Madison Boulder was designated as a National Natural Landmark by the National Park Service.

== Notable people ==
- E. E. Cummings (1894–1962), poet
- Don Orsillo (born 1968), former announcer for the Boston Red Sox
