= Wolfeboro (CDP), New Hampshire =

Census-designated place in New Hampshire, United States

Wolfeboro, New Hampshire
- Census-designated place
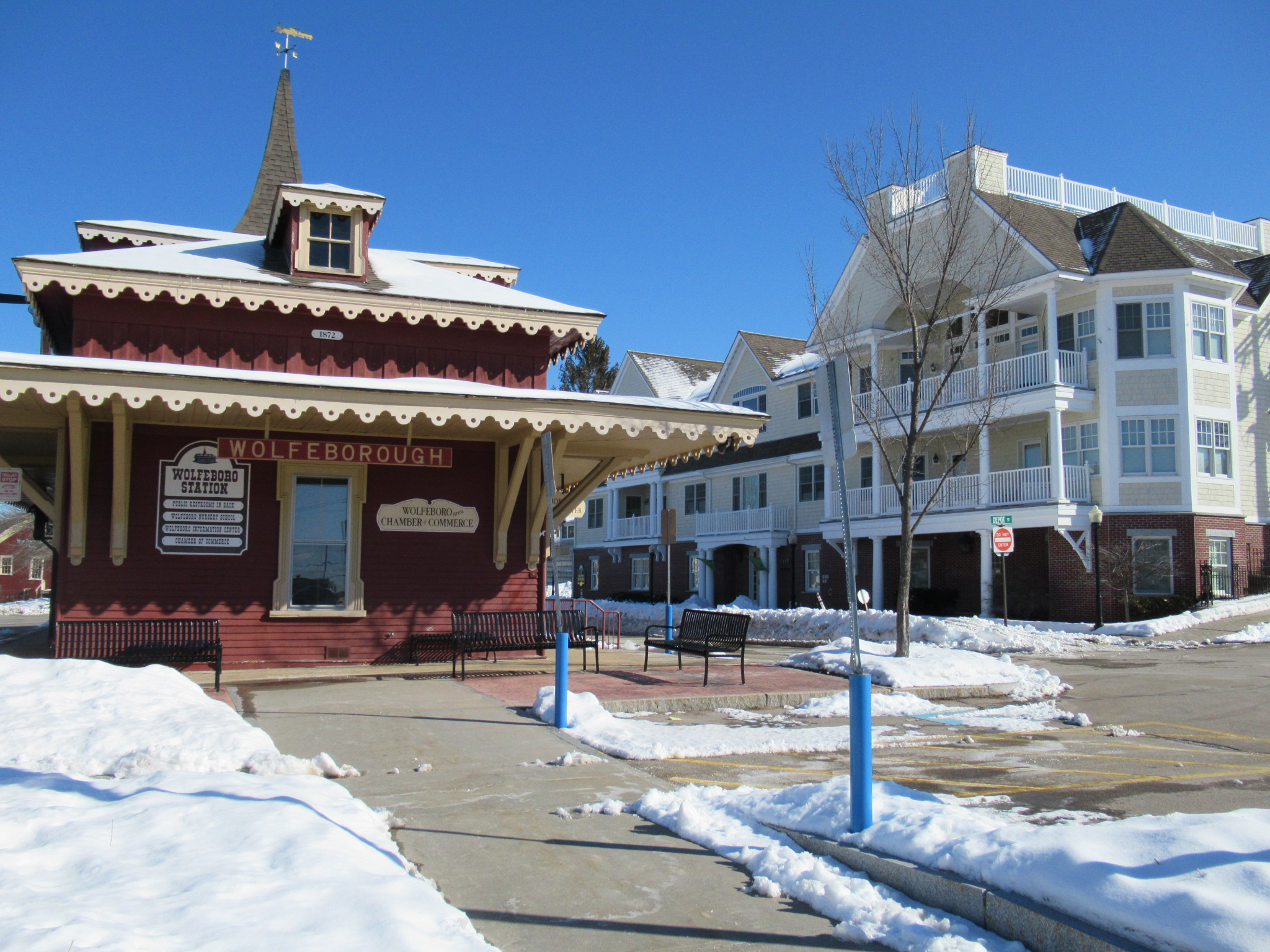
- The former Wolfeboro Railroad station in the center of Wolfeboro village

- Location within New Hampshire Location within the United States
- Coordinates: 43°35′30″N 71°12′46″W
- Country: United States
- State: New Hampshire
- County: Carroll
- Town: Wolfeboro

Area
  - Total: 8.19 sq mi (21.21 km^{2})
  - Land: 7.86 sq mi (20.36 km^{2})
  - Water: 0.33 sq mi (0.85 km^{2})
- Elevation: 532 ft (162 m)

Population (2020)
  - Total: 3,300
  - Density: 419.8/sq mi (162.08/km^{2})
- Time zone: UTC-5 (Eastern (EST))
  - Summer (DST): UTC-4 (EDT)
- ZIP code: 03894 (Wolfeboro); 03896 (Wolfeboro Falls)
- Area code: 603
- FIPS code: 33-86340
- GNIS feature ID: 2378098

Wolfeboro is a census-designated place (CDP) in the town of Wolfeboro, New Hampshire, United States. It consists of the main village of Wolfeboro within the town, as well as the smaller village of Wolfeboro Falls. The population of the CDP was 3,300 at the 2020 census, out of 6,416 in the entire town of Wolfeboro.

== Geography ==
The CDP is in the southern part of the town of Wolfeboro, between Lake Winnipesaukee to the south and Lake Wentworth to the northeast. New Hampshire Route 28 is the main highway through the village, entering from the southeast as Tuftonboro Road, then turning northeast on Center Street. NH 28 leads south 11 miles (18 km) to Alton and northeast 9 miles (14 km) to Ossipee. New Hampshire Route 109 enters Wolfeboro village from the west on North Main Street, then joins NH 28 to leave to the northeast on Center Street. NH 109 leads northwest 10 miles (16 km) to Melvin Village in the town of Tuftonboro and east 12 miles (19 km) to Sanbornville in the town of Wakefield. New Hampshire Route 109A (Elm Street) departs from NH 28/109 in Wolfeboro Falls, leading northwest 17 miles (27 km) to Moultonborough.

The Wolfeboro CDP is bordered to the south by Winter Harbor and Wolfeboro Bay of Lake Winnipesaukee, from Keewaydin Road in the west to a line between Sinclair Lane and Mountain West Drive in the east. The eastern edge of the CDP follows Cross Road and Pleasant Valley Road northeast to Heath Brook, then follows the brook northwest downstream to Lake Wentworth. The CDP border follows the western shore of Lake Wentworth north to Hodges Road, then follows Trotting Track Road west to Beach Pond Road, and south to NH 109A. The western edge of the CDP is Waumbeck Road from NH 109A south to a brook just north of NH 109, then follows the brook west to Keewaydin Road.

According to the U.S. Census Bureau, the Wolfeboro CDP has a total area of 8.2 square miles (21.2 km^{2}), of which 7.9 square miles (20.4 km^{2}) are land and 0.3 square miles (0.9 km^{2}), or 4.02%, are water.

== Demographics ==
Historical population
Census	Pop.	Note	%±
1950	1,271		—
1960	1,557		22.5%
1970	1,718		10.3%
1980	2,271		32.2%
1990	2,783		22.5%
2000	2,979		7.0%
2010	2,838		−4.7%
2020	3,300		16.3%
U.S. Decennial Census

As of the 2010 census, there were 2,838 people, 1,353 households, and 795 families residing in the CDP. There were 1,858 housing units, of which 505 (27.2%) were vacant. 355 of the vacant units were seasonal or vacation units. The racial makeup of the town was 97.6% White, 0.2% African American, 0.2% Native American, 0.7% Asian, 0.1% some other race, and 1.3% from two or more races. 1.5% of the population were Hispanic or Latino of any race.

Of the 1,353 households in the CDP, 19.6% had children under the age of 18 living with them, 47.6% were headed by married couples living together, 7.9% had a female householder with no husband present, and 41.2% were non-families. 36.7% of all households were made up of individuals, and 20.1% were someone living alone who was 65 years of age or older. The average household size was 2.04, and the average family size was 2.61.

Within the CDP, 16.2% of the population were under the age of 18, 5.1% were from 18 to 24, 15.2% were from 25 to 44, 31.3% were from 45 to 64, and 32.2% were 65 years of age or older. The median age was 54.0 years. For every 100 females, there were 88.1 males. For every 100 females age 18 and over, there were 85.0 males.

For the period 2011–15, the estimated median annual income for a household was $62,019, and the median income for a family was $69,091. The per capita income for the CDP was $36,899. 10.1% of the population and 4.8% of families were below the poverty line. 11.1% of all residents under the age of 18 and 1.6% of those 65 or older were living in poverty.
