= List of islands of New Hampshire =

Island	County	Water body	Elevation (feet)	Elevation (metres)
Badger Island	Carroll	Lake Winnipesaukee	505	154
Barndoor Island	Belknap	Lake Winnipesaukee	515	157
Bass Island	Carroll	Lake Wentworth	535	163
Bear Island	Merrimack	Suncook River	344	105
Bear Island	Coos	Umbagog Lake	1,243	379
Bear Island	Belknap	Lake Winnipesaukee	525	160
Beaver Island	Belknap	Lake Winnipesaukee	545	166
Beckmans Island	Rockingham	Seabrook salt marsh	7	2
Beech Island	Strafford	Bow Lake	518	158
Belle Island	Grafton	Newfound Lake	587	179
Bennett Island	Strafford	Bow Lake	515	157
Big Island	Carroll	Lovell Lake	581	177
Big Island	Belknap	Paugus Bay	502	153
Big Island	Coos	Umbagog Lake	1,299	396
Big Island	Rockingham	Pawtuckaway Lake	367	112
Big Island	Carroll	Silver Lake	466	142
Bimba Island	Carroll	Silver Lake	466	142
Birch Hill Island	Carroll	Lake Winnipesaukee	512	156
Birch Island	Rockingham	Massabesic Lake	259	79
Birch Island	Carroll	Lake Winnipesaukee	518	158
Birch Island	Grafton	Squam Lake	561	171
Black Cat Island	Carroll	Lake Winnipesaukee	538	164
Black Island	Carroll	Lake Winnipesaukee	512	156
Blake Island	Coos	Umbagog Lake	1,243	379
Blueberry Island	Carroll	Lake Winnipesaukee	505	154
Blunts Island	Rockingham	Little Harbor	13	4
Bowman Island	Grafton	Squam Lake	597	182
Bradleys Island (former)	Merrimack	Merrimack River	230	70
Breezy Island	Belknap	Lake Winnipesaukee	502	153
Browns Island	Rockingham	Massabesic Lake	299	91
Brummet Island	Carroll	Lake Wentworth	535	163
Buck Island	Coos	Androscoggin River	774	236
Burkehaven Island	Sullivan	Lake Sunapee	1,099	335
Burnaps Island	Sullivan	Connecticut River	315	96
Calef Island	Strafford	Swains Lake	279	85
Camp Island	Belknap	Lake Winnipesaukee	509	155
Carthagina Island	Hillsborough	Merrimack River	131	40
Cate Island	Carroll	Lake Wentworth	535	163
Catsbane Island	Cheshire	Connecticut River	217	66
Chapman Island	Belknap	Lake Waukewan	551	168
Chase Island	Rockingham	Island Pond	210	64
Chase Island	Sullivan	Connecticut River	315	96
Chases Island	Carroll	Lake Winnipesaukee	525	160
Chip Island	Carroll	Lake Winnipesaukee	502	153
Chocorua Island	Grafton	Squam Lake	561	171
Church Island	Carroll	Lake Winnipesaukee	505	154
Clampit Island	Rockingham	Little Harbor	0	0
Clark Island	Hillsborough	Baboosic Lake	246	75
Commons Island	Rockingham	Hampton Harbor	0	0
Cove Island	Carroll	Lake Winnipesaukee	502	153
Cow Island	Carroll	Lake Winnipesaukee	617	188
Cut Island	Belknap	Lake Winnipesaukee	505	154
Devens Island	Carroll	Lake Winnipesaukee	509	155
Diamond Island	Belknap	Lake Winnipesaukee	584	178
Doles Island	Rockingham	Blackwater River	3	1
Dollar Island	Belknap	Lake Winnipesaukee	502	153
Dolly Island	Belknap	Lake Winnipesaukee	502	153
Dow Island	Carroll	Lake Winnipesaukee	522	159
Duds Island	Belknap	Lake Winnipesaukee	502	153
Dunshee Island	Cheshire	Connecticut River	236	72
Eagle Island	Belknap	Lake Winnipesaukee	505	154
Echo Island	Carroll	Lake Winnipesaukee	502	153
Emerald Island	Sullivan	Lake Sunapee	1,096	334
Escumbuit Island	Rockingham	Island Pond	210	64
Evans Island	Coos	Androscoggin River	682	208
Evergreen Island	Carroll	Lake Winnipesaukee	509	155
Farm Island	Carroll	Lake Winnipesaukee	525	160
Fish Island	Belknap	Lake Winnipesaukee	502	153
Fivemile Island	Carroll	Lake Winnipesaukee	531	162
Fletcher Island	Hillsborough	Massabesic Lake	253	77
Flo Island	Carroll	Lake Wentworth	535	163
Footman Islands	Strafford	Great Bay	0	0
Forty Islands	Belknap	Lake Winnipesaukee	502	153
Four Tree Island	Rockingham	Piscataqua River	7	2
Gansy Island	Carroll	Lake Winnipesaukee	509	155
Gate Island	Carroll	Lake Winnipesaukee	502	153
Gerrish Isle	Grafton	Mascoma River	466	142
Gleason Island	Grafton	Connecticut River	459	140
Glidden Island	Sullivan	Connecticut River	282	86
Glines Island	Carroll	Lake Winnipesaukee	518	158
Goat Island	Rockingham	Piscataqua River	0	0
Goat Island	Rockingham	Little Bay	0	0
Goodwin Island	Carroll	Lake Winnipesaukee	512	156
Goose Island	Rockingham	Sagamore Creek	0	0
Governors Island	Belknap	Lake Winnipesaukee	646	197
Governors Island	Rockingham	Island Pond	239	73
Grape Islands	Rockingham	Massabesic Lake	253	77
Great Island	Grafton	Squam Lake	650	198
Great Island	Merrimack	Lake Sunapee	1,119	341
Groton Island	Grafton	Squam Lake	561	171
Guay Island	Carroll	Lake Winnipesaukee	502	153
Gun Island	Carroll	Lake Winnipesaukee	522	159
Gun Island	Carroll	Lake Winnipesaukee	502	153
Halfmile Island	Belknap	Lake Winnipesaukee	515	157
Harbor Island	Carroll	Lake Winnipesaukee	502	153
Harmony Island	Carroll	Lake Winnipesaukee	512	156
Hart Island	Sullivan	Connecticut River	325	99
Hawks Nest Island	Belknap	Lake Winnipesaukee	505	154
Hen Island	Rockingham	Little Bay	0	0
Hen Island	Belknap	Lake Winnipesaukee	502	153
Hermit Island	Carroll	Lake Winnipesaukee	505	154
Hinman Island	Coos	Connecticut River	869	265
Hoag Island	Carroll	Squam Lake	600	183
Hog Island	Belknap	Winnisquam Lake	482	147
Horse Island	Belknap	Lake Winnipesaukee	502	153
Horse Island	Rockingham	Pawtuckaway Lake	259	79
Horseshoe Island	Merrimack	Horseshoe Pond	230	70
Howard Island	Grafton	Connecticut River	423	129
Hubbard Island	Sullivan	Connecticut River	322	98
Hull Island	Carroll	Lake Winnipesaukee	522	159
Hunts Island	Rockingham	Seabrook salt marsh	10	3
Inner Sunk Rocks	Rockingham	Atlantic Ocean	0	0
Isles of Shoals	Rockingham	Atlantic Ocean	46	14
Jarvis Island	Sullivan	Connecticut River	305	93
Jockey Cap Island	Carroll	Lake Wentworth	535	163
Joe Island	Carroll	Lake Wentworth	535	163
Joes Island	Carroll	Lake Winnipesaukee	522	159
Johnston Island	Grafton	Connecticut River	325	99
Jolly Island	Belknap	Lake Winnipesaukee	541	165
Keel Island	Carroll	Lake Winnipesaukee	502	153
Keniston Island	Carroll	Lake Winnipesaukee	522	159
Kent Island	Carroll	Squam Lake	587	179
Kimball Island	Belknap	Squam Lake	584	178
Knowles Island	Rockingham	Hampton Harbor	0	0
Lady Isle	Rockingham	Little Harbor	23	7
Laurel Island	Grafton	Squam Lake	561	171
Leachs Island	Rockingham	Little Harbor	23	7
Ledge Island	Sullivan	Connecticut River	312	95
Ledge Island	Carroll	Lake Winnipesaukee	502	153
Lincoln Island	Carroll	Lake Winnipesaukee	505	154
Little Barndoor Island	Belknap	Lake Winnipesaukee	509	155
Little Bear Island	Carroll	Lake Winnipesaukee	640	195
Little Birch Island	Carroll	Lake Winnipesaukee	505	154
Little Camp Island	Belknap	Lake Winnipesaukee	509	155
Little Island	Rockingham	Piscataqua River	0	0
Little Island	Belknap	Paugus Bay	502	153
Little Island	Sullivan	Lake Sunapee	1,102	336
Little Keniston Island	Carroll	Lake Winnipesaukee	502	153
Little Loon Island	Carroll	Squam Lake	561	171
Little Sixmile Island	Belknap	Lake Winnipesaukee	502	153
Littlemark Island	Belknap	Lake Winnipesaukee	502	153
Locks Island	Belknap	Lake Winnipesaukee	548	167
Log Cabin Island	Rockingham	Pawtuckaway Lake	259	79
Long Island	Belknap	Squam Lake	561	171
Long Island	Carroll	Lake Winnipesaukee	669	204
Long Pine Island	Carroll	Lake Winnipesaukee	502	153
Loon Island	Carroll	Lake Wentworth	535	163
Loon Island	Strafford	Bow Lake	518	158
Loon Island	Rockingham	Island Pond	203	62
Loon Island	Rockingham	Massabesic Lake	256	78
Loon Island	Sullivan	Lake Sunapee	1,093	333
Loon Island	Belknap	Winnisquam Lake	482	147
Loon Island	Grafton	Newfound Lake	587	179
Loon Island	Carroll	Silver Lake	466	142
Loon Island	Belknap	Lake Winnipesaukee	502	153
Loon Island	Carroll	Lake Winnipesaukee	502	153
Loon Island	Carroll	Squam Lake	561	171
Lunging Island	Rockingham	Atlantic Ocean	3	1
Majors Rock	Rockingham	Seabrook salt marsh	7	2
Mark Island	Belknap	Lake Winnipesaukee	623	190
Mason Island	Coos	Connecticut River	866	264
Mayhew Island	Grafton	Newfound Lake	656	200
Melody Island	Carroll	Lake Winnipesaukee	515	157
Melvin Island	Carroll	Lake Winnipesaukee	505	154
Merrill Island	Grafton	Squam Lake	587	179
Metallak Island	Coos	Umbagog Lake	1,247	380
Mile Island	Carroll	Lake Winnipesaukee	502	153
Min Island	Carroll	Lake Wentworth	535	163
Minister Island	Carroll	Lake Winnipesaukee	512	156
Mink Island	Carroll	Lake Wentworth	535	163
Mink Island	Belknap	Lake Winnipesaukee	518	158
Mink Island	Grafton	Squam Lake	561	171
Moat Island	Strafford	Lamprey River	30	9
Mohawk Island	Belknap	Winnisquam Lake	482	147
Mooney Island	Grafton	Squam Lake	577	176
Moose Island	Belknap	Lake Winnipesaukee	502	153
Mouse Island	Belknap	Squam Lake	561	171
Mud Island	Carroll	Lake Winnipesaukee	505	154
Nannie Island	Rockingham	Great Bay	0	0
New Castle Island	Rockingham	Piscataqua River	13	4
Nine Islands	Coos	Connecticut River	568	173
Nineacre Island	Carroll	Lake Winnipesaukee	522	159
No Mans Island	Grafton	Connecticut River	404	123
Oak Island	Belknap	Lake Winnipesaukee	518	158
Otter Island	Carroll	Squam Lake	561	171
Outer Sunk Rocks	Rockingham	Atlantic Ocean	0	0
Overlook Island	Carroll	Pine River Pond	584	178
Overnight Island	Carroll	Lake Winnipesaukee	502	153
Ozone Island	Carroll	Lake Winnipesaukee	502	153
Paradise Island	Cheshire	Lake Monomonac	1,089	332
Parker Island	Carroll	Lake Winnipesaukee	505	154
Peirce Island	Rockingham	Piscataqua River	13	4
Penny Island	Belknap	Lake Winnipesaukee	502	153
Perch Island	Grafton	Squam Lake	561	171
Perch Island	Carroll	Lake Winnipesaukee	505	154
Pest Island	Rockingham	Little Harbor	16	5
Picnic Island	Rockingham	Massabesic Lake	253	77
Pierces Island	Cheshire	Spofford Lake	735	224
Pig Island	Belknap	Lake Winnipesaukee	502	153
Pine Island	Belknap	Lake Winnipesaukee	538	164
Pine Island	Strafford	Bow Lake	518	158
Pistol Island	Carroll	Lake Winnipesaukee	502	153
Pitchwood Island	Belknap	Lake Winnipesaukee	509	155
Pleasant Island	Carroll	Lake Winnipesaukee	505	154
Plummer Island	Belknap	Paugus Bay	505	154
Poplar Island	Carroll	Lake Winnipesaukee	522	159
Poplar Island	Carroll	Lake Wentworth	541	165
Pot Island	Belknap	Winnisquam Lake	482	147
Potato Island	Grafton	Squam Lake	561	171
Ragged Island	Carroll	Lake Winnipesaukee	505	154
Rattlesnake Island	Belknap	Lake Winnipesaukee	791	241
Redhead Island	Belknap	Lake Winnipesaukee	518	158
Rock Island	Belknap	Lake Winnipesaukee	505	154
Round Island	Belknap	Lake Winnipesaukee	541	165
Round Island	Carroll	Lake Winnipesaukee	502	153
Rye Island	Strafford	Bow Lake	518	158
Sandy Island	Carroll	Lake Winnipesaukee	525	160
Scavenger Island	Carroll	Lake Winnipesaukee	502	153
Seven Islands	Coos	Androscoggin River	1,178	359
Seven Sisters Islands	Carroll	Lake Wentworth	535	163
Shapleigh Island	Rockingham	Piscataqua River	20	6
Sheep Island	Grafton	Squam Lake	561	171
Shelter Island	Carroll	Lake Winnipesaukee	502	153
Ship Island	Belknap	Lake Winnipesaukee	502	153
Sixmile Island	Belknap	Lake Winnipesaukee	571	174
Sleepers Island	Belknap	Lake Winnipesaukee	696	212
Spectacle Island	Carroll	Lake Winnipesaukee	502	153
Spencer Island	Cheshire	Connecticut River	226	69
Spider Island	Carroll	Lake Winnipesaukee	502	153
Stamp Act Island	Carroll	Lake Winnipesaukee	538	164
Star Island	Rockingham	Atlantic Ocean	0	0
Star Island	Sullivan	Lake Sunapee	1,102	336
Steamboat Island	Belknap	Lake Winnipesaukee	522	159
Stebbins Island	Cheshire	Connecticut River	223	68
Stevens Island	Coos	Connecticut River	453	138
Stonedam Island	Belknap	Lake Winnipesaukee	696	212
Store Island	Carroll	Lake Winnipesaukee	502	153
Sumner Island	Belknap	Pemigewasset River	318	97
Sunken Island	Strafford	Cocheco River	105	32
Swan Island	Rockingham	Great Bay	0	0
Swill Island	Carroll	Lake Winnipesaukee	502	153
The Beavers	Belknap	Lake Winnipesaukee	505	154
The Hubbles	Grafton	Squam Lake	561	171
Three Islands	Belknap	Winnisquam Lake	509	155
Three Sisters Island	Grafton	Squam Lake	561	171
Threemile Island	Belknap	Lake Winnipesaukee	545	166
Timber Island	Belknap	Lake Winnipesaukee	548	167
Triggs Island	Carroll	Lake Wentworth	541	165
Turtle Island	Carroll	Lake Wentworth	535	163
Twin Islands	Carroll	Lake Winnipesaukee	505	154
Twomile Island	Carroll	Lake Winnipesaukee	528	161
Upper Shore Island	Carroll	Lake Winnipesaukee	502	153
Varney Islands	Carroll	Lake Winnipesaukee	502	153
Vols Island	Rockingham	Great Bay	0	0
Wal Island	Carroll	Lake Wentworth	535	163
Walcott Island	Sullivan	Connecticut River	285	87
Wallace Island	Carroll	Lake Winnipesaukee	505	154
Welch Island	Belknap	Lake Winnipesaukee	564	172
Wentworth Island	Coos	Androscoggin River	1,165	355
West Jockey Cap Island	Carroll	Lake Wentworth	535	163
Whaleback Island	Carroll	Lake Winnipesaukee	509	155
White Island	Rockingham	Atlantic Ocean	26	8
Whortleberry Island	Carroll	Lake Winnipesaukee	515	157
Winch Island	Carroll	Lake Winnipesaukee	502	153
Wood Island	Grafton	Mascoma Lake	751	229
Worcester Island	Carroll	Lake Winnipesaukee	522	159
Wrights Island	Rockingham	Seabrook salt marsh	7	2
Yard Island	Carroll	Squam Lake	561	171
York Island	Strafford	Bow Lake	518	158
