= Beckmans Island =

Island in New Hampshire

- Interactive map of Beckmans Island

Geography
- Location: New Hampshire
- Coordinates: 42°53′25.33″N 70°50′30.19″W
- Highest elevation: 3 ft (0.9 m)

Administration
- United States
- State: New Hampshire
- County: Rockingham County

Beckmans Island, is a small privately owned island near Beckmans Landing in Seabrook, Rockingham County, New Hampshire, United States. It is owned by the Beckman family, who allow public access to the island. It is named after John Robinson Beckman, a Revolutionary War soldier who was the first member of the Beckman family to settle in Seabrook; Beckmans Point, Pond, and Landing are nearby features which were also named after him.

== Geography ==
Beckmans Island is surrounded by a salt marsh rich with bird life. To its west is Beckmans Landing, a neighborhood in Seabrook, from which a bridge at low tide can access it. To its north and south are Hunts Island Creek and Mill Creek, respectively, and to its northeast is a smaller unnamed island. Trees cover the island itself, and a trail running through the center from the bridge leads to Beckmans Landing. The island features two old structures: an old fishing hut and a structure that is speculated to have been a cowpen. The island is surrounded by an old stone wall erected in the 1700s.

== Ecology ==
The flora of the island is typical of the surrounding area, with fox sedge, common copperleaf, staghorn sumac, saltmeadow cordgrass, bluejacket, common selfheal as well as plants introduced to the island liked roses. There are no mammals on the island other than possibly eastern cottontail and small rodents. The island and the surrounding area are home to rich bird life, with 136 recorded species. Birds that are known to breed in the area surrounding the island include the American goldfinch, tufted titmouse, song sparrow, great crested flycatcher, Carolina wren, orchard oriole, and red-bellied woodpecker. Birds typical of the surrounding salt marsh include the great egret, snowy egret, saltmarsh sparrow, glossy ibis, willet, fish crow and osprey.
