= Wolfeboro, New Hampshire =

- Town
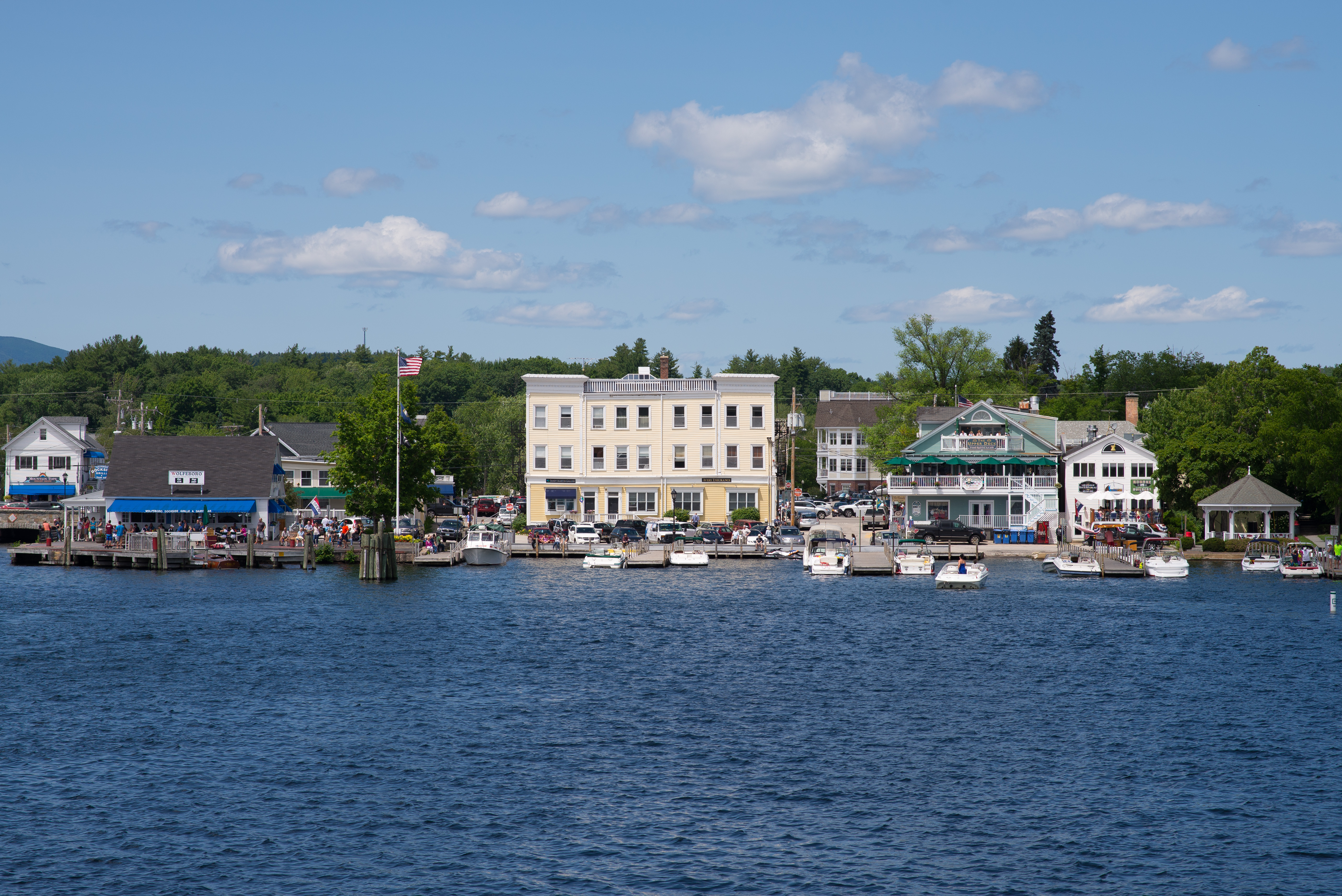
- View of the town docks of Wolfeboro
- Motto: "The Oldest Summer Resort in America"
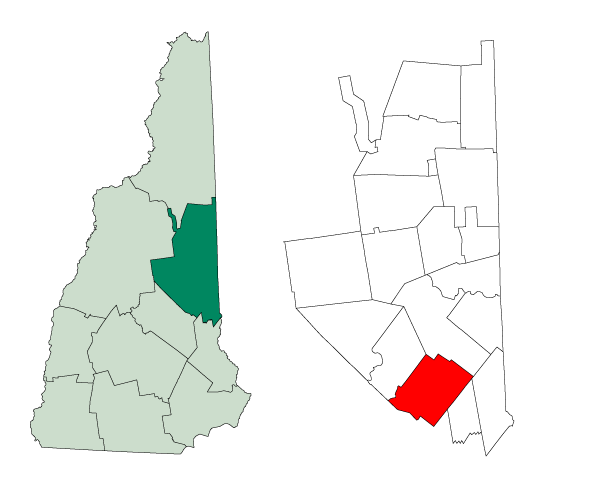
- Location in Carroll County, New Hampshire
- Coordinates: 43°36′53″N 71°10′24″W
- Country: United States
- State: New Hampshire
- County: Carroll
- Incorporated: 1770
- Named for: James Wolfe
- Villages: Wolfeboro; East Wolfeboro; North Wolfeboro; South Wolfeboro; Wolfeboro Center; Wolfeboro Falls

Area
  - Total: 58.5 sq mi (151.4 km^{2})
  - Land: 48.0 sq mi (124.2 km^{2})
  - Water: 10.5 sq mi (27.2 km^{2}) 17.95%
- Elevation: 532 ft (162 m)

Population (2020)
  - Total: 6,416
  - Density: 134/sq mi (51.7/km^{2})
- Time zone: UTC-5 (Eastern)
  - Summer (DST): UTC-4 (Eastern)
- ZIP code: 03894
- Area code: 603
- FIPS code: 33-86420
- GNIS feature ID: 873760
- Website: www.wolfeboronh.us

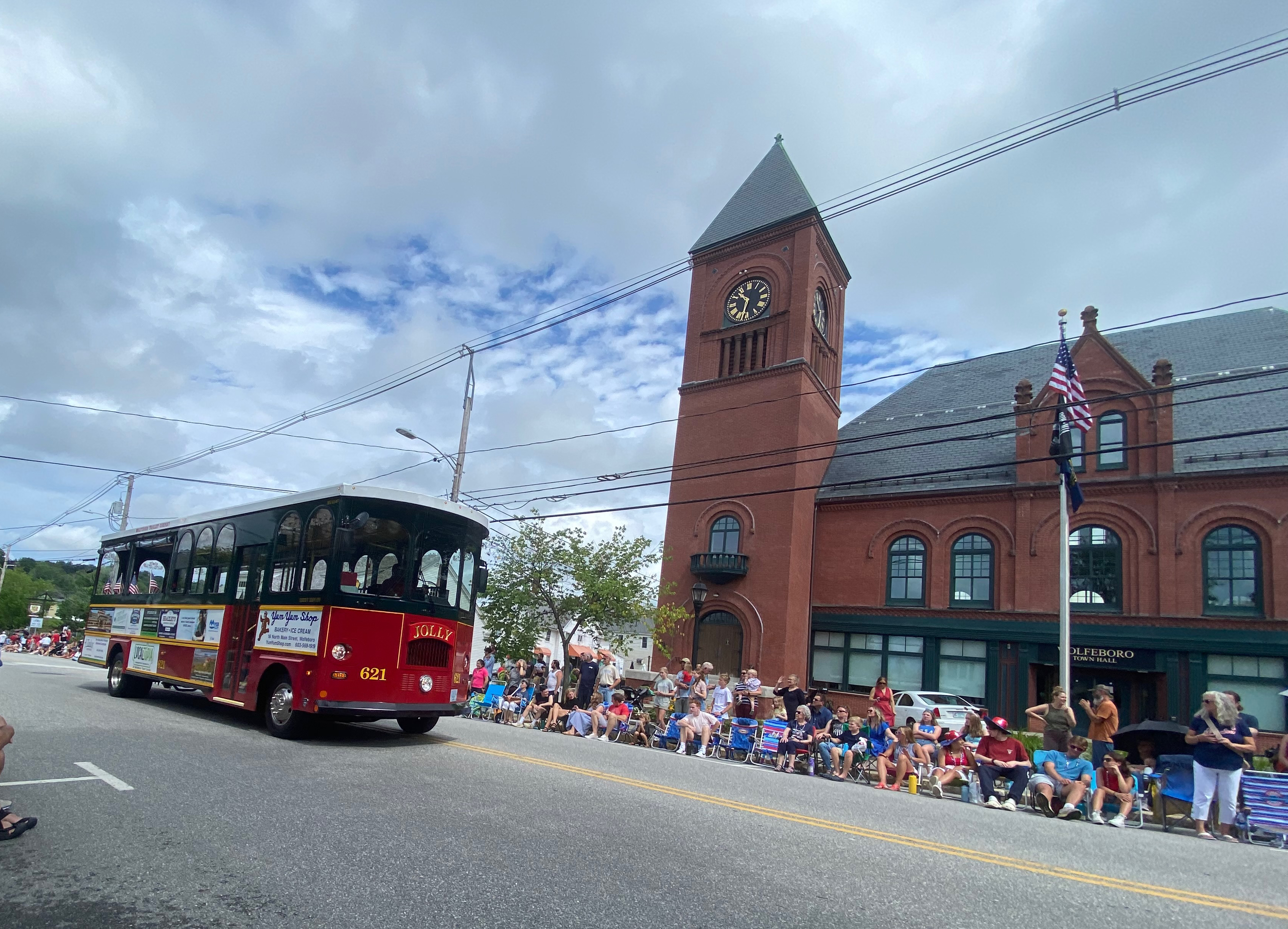
Jolly the Trolley rolls by Town Hall during the July 4th parade in Wolfeboro.

Wolfeboro is a town in Carroll County, New Hampshire, United States. The population was 6,416 at the 2020 census, and an estimated 6,637 in 2025. A resort area on Lake Winnipesaukee, the town includes the villages of Wolfeboro, East Wolfeboro, North Wolfeboro, South Wolfeboro, Wolfeboro Center, and Wolfeboro Falls.

== History ==
The town was granted by colonial Governor Benning Wentworth in 1759 to four young men of Portsmouth, and named "Wolfeborough" in honor of English General James Wolfe, who had been victorious at the Battle of the Plains of Abraham in 1759 during the French and Indian War. In 1763, 2,300 acres (930 ha) were added to the 60 acres (24 ha) reserved for the governor. Colonial Governor John Wentworth, Benning Wentworth's nephew, established an estate on the site, known as Kingswood. Built in 1771 beside what is now called Lake Wentworth, this was the first summer country estate in northern New England. Settled in 1768, the town was incorporated in 1770.

Over the years Wolfeboro, whose town motto is "The Oldest Summer Resort in America", became a popular summer colony, particularly for families from Boston and southern New Hampshire. Prince Rainier and Princess Grace of Monaco, Kurt Vonnegut, Drew Barrymore and Jimmy Fallon have spent time in Wolfeboro. In August 2007, then French president Nicolas Sarkozy vacationed there.

In May 2014, it was discovered that 82-year-old police commissioner Robert Copeland had been overheard in a cafe two months earlier using a racial epithet to refer to then President Barack Obama. Copeland acknowledged in an email to his colleagues that he did in fact use the word, saying "for this, I do not apologize—he meets and exceeds my criteria for such." At a subsequent meeting with residents, Copeland refused calls for his resignation. A few days later, he submitted his resignation.

== Geography ==
The main village of Wolfeboro is located at the head of Wolfeboro Bay on Lake Winnipesaukee, at the junction of New Hampshire routes 28 and 109. Wolfeboro Falls is just 1 mile (2 km) to the north along Routes 28/109.

According to the United States Census Bureau, the town has a total area of 58.5 square miles (151.4 km^{2}), of which 48.0 square miles (124.2 km^{2}) are land and 10.5 square miles (27.2 km^{2}) are water, comprising 17.95% of the town. Wolfeboro is drained by the Smith River, which is the outlet of Lake Wentworth and an inlet of Lake Winnipesaukee. Via Winnipesaukee, the town is part of the Merrimack River watershed. The highest point in town is Moody Mountain, elevation 1,420 feet (430 m) above sea level, located near the northern boundary.

The town is home to Wentworth State Park, a 50-acre (0.20 km^{2}) state park on the shore of Lake Wentworth.

=== Adjacent municipalities ===
- Ossipee (north)
- Wakefield (east)
- Brookfield (east)
- New Durham (southeast)
- Alton (south)
- Tuftonboro (west)

== Demographics ==
Historical population
| Census | Pop. | Note | %± |
|---|---|---|---|
| 1790 | 447 | | — |
| 1800 | 941 | | 110.5% |
| 1810 | 1,376 | | 46.2% |
| 1820 | 1,794 | | 30.4% |
| 1830 | 1,929 | | 7.5% |
| 1840 | 1,918 | | −0.6% |
| 1850 | 2,038 | | 6.3% |
| 1860 | 2,300 | | 12.9% |
| 1870 | 1,995 | | −13.3% |
| 1880 | 2,222 | | 11.4% |
| 1890 | 3,020 | | 35.9% |
| 1900 | 2,390 | | −20.9% |
| 1910 | 2,224 | | −6.9% |
| 1920 | 2,178 | | −2.1% |
| 1930 | 2,358 | | 8.3% |
| 1940 | 2,636 | | 11.8% |
| 1950 | 2,581 | | −2.1% |
| 1960 | 2,689 | | 4.2% |
| 1970 | 3,036 | | 12.9% |
| 1980 | 3,968 | | 30.7% |
| 1990 | 4,807 | | 21.1% |
| 2000 | 6,083 | | 26.5% |
| 2010 | 6,269 | | 3.1% |
| 2020 | 6,416 | | 2.3% |
| 2024 (est.) | 6,625 | | 3.3% |
U.S. Decennial Census

As of the 2010 census, there were 6,269 people, 2,839 households, and 1,848 families residing in the town. There were 4,443 housing units, of which 1,604 (36.1%) were vacant. 1,322 of the vacant units were vacation properties or seasonal homes. The racial makeup of the town was 97.6% White, 0.2% African American, 0.2% Native American, 0.8% Asian, 0.02% Pacific Islander, 0.2% some other race, and 1.0% from two or more races. 1.3% of the population were Hispanic or Latino of any race.

Of the 2,839 households in the town, 22.6% had children under the age of 18 living with them, 54.2% were headed by married couples living together, 7.7% had a female householder with no husband present, and 34.9% were non-families. 30.4% of all households were made up of individuals, and 16.6% were someone living alone who was 65 years of age or older. The average household size was 2.18, and the average family size was 2.68.

In the town, 17.9% of the population were under the age of 18, 4.8% were from 18 to 24, 15.8% were from 25 to 44, 33.5% were from 45 to 64, and 28.0% were 65 years of age or older. The median age was 52.1 years. For every 100 females, there were 91.4 males. For every 100 females age 18 and over, there were 88.6 males.

For the period 2011–2015, the estimated median annual income for a household in the town was $58,204, and the median income for a family was $68,409. Male full-time workers had a median income of $51,466 versus $41,288 for females. The per capita income for the town was $35,307. 7.4% of the population and 4.2% of families were below the poverty line. 10.4% of residents under the age of 18 were living in poverty, compare to 0.7% of those aged 65 or older.

== Education ==
Wolfeboro is served by Kingswood Regional High School, located on Main Street southeast of the center of town. Adjoining the high school is Kingswood Regional Middle School. The two elementary schools located in the community are Carpenter and Crescent Lake. All of the aforementioned schools are part of the Governor Wentworth Regional School District, which includes five additional towns. The town is also home to Brewster Academy, a private preparatory school.

The Wolfeboro Camp School, which converted the Hill School Camp, enrolls 200 students domestic and international.

== Health care ==
Wolfeboro's largest health care facility is Huggins Hospital, a non-profit hospital that serves the communities of Alton, Brookfield, Effingham, Freedom, Madison, Moultonborough, New Durham, Ossipee, Sanbornville, Sandwich, Tamworth, Tuftonboro, Wakefield, Wolfeboro, and other surrounding towns. Huggins is a Critical Access Hospital (CAH). CAHs are hospitals with no more than 25 inpatient beds; Huggins has 25. Huggins has a relationship with the Dartmouth-Hitchcock Air Transport Service (DHART) that can provide trauma victims access to helicopter in as little as 20 minutes, so they can be transported to the Dartmouth–Hitchcock Medical Center.

== Historic images ==
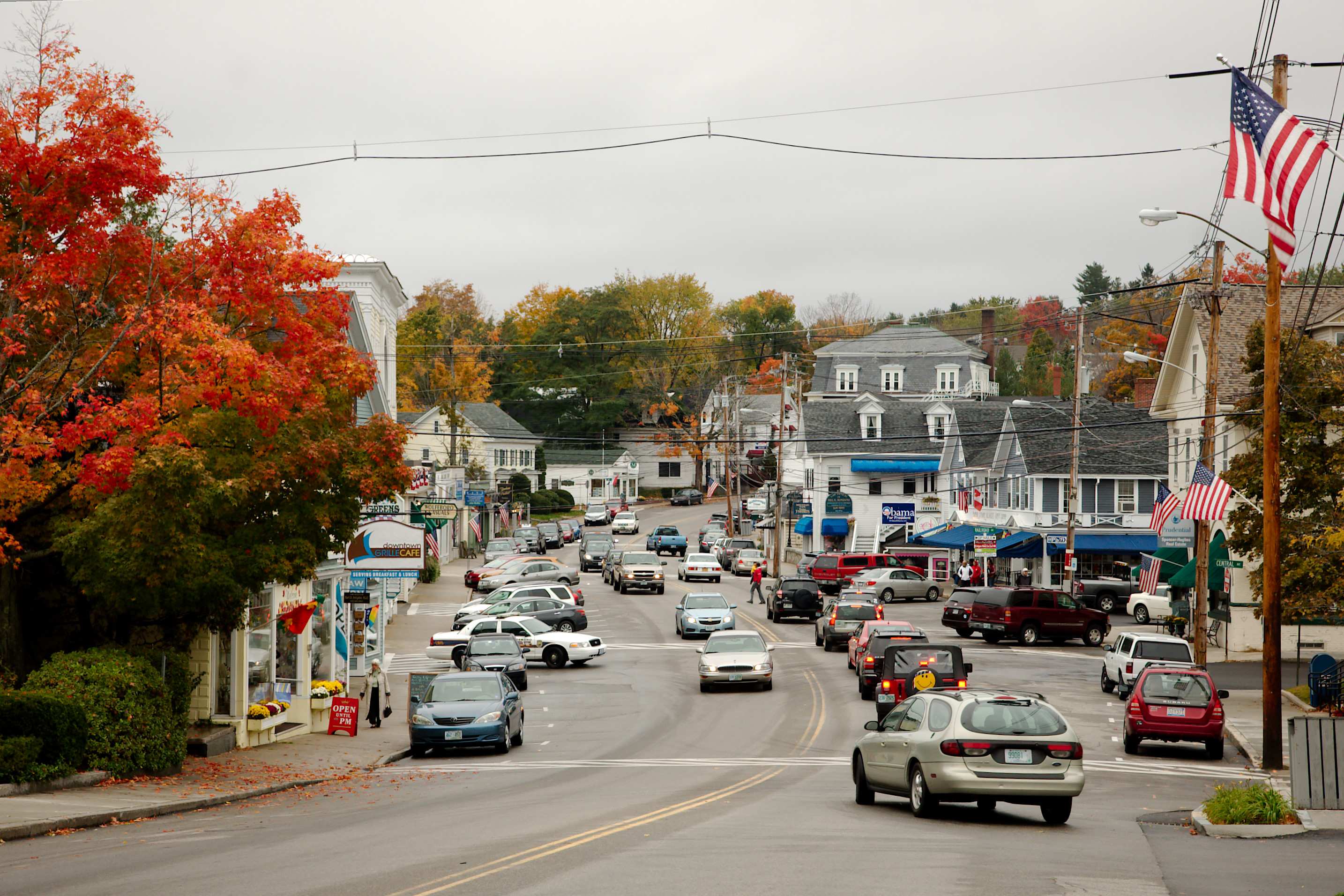
View of Main Street in the fall

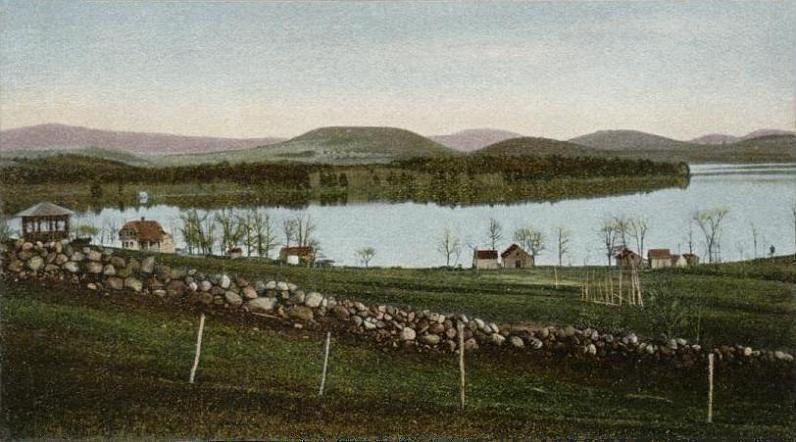
Wolfeboro Bay c. 1906

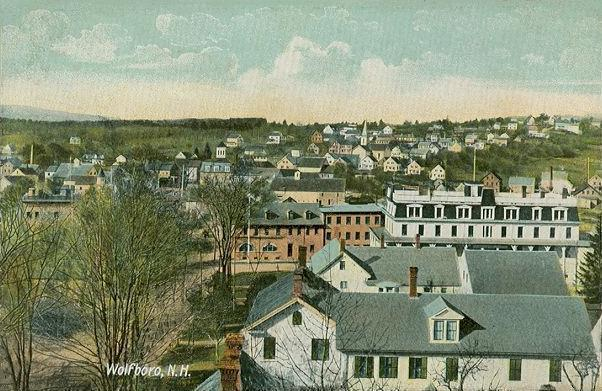
Bird's-eye view in 1909

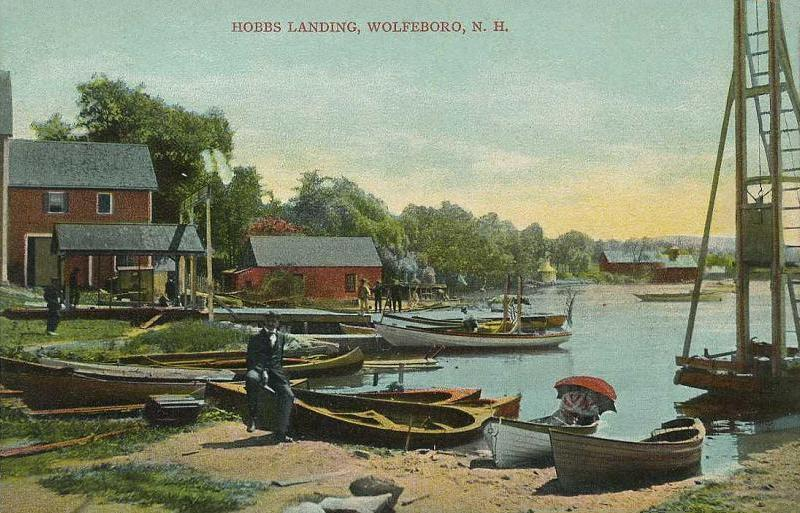
Hobbs Landing c. 1910

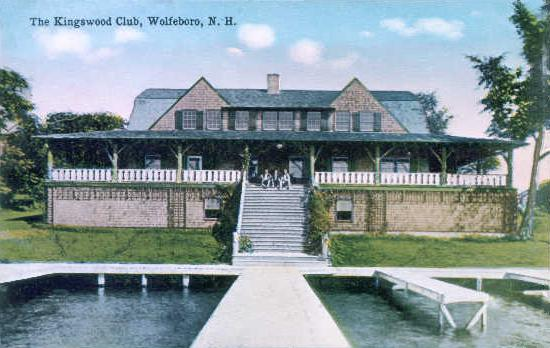
The Kingswood Club c. 1910

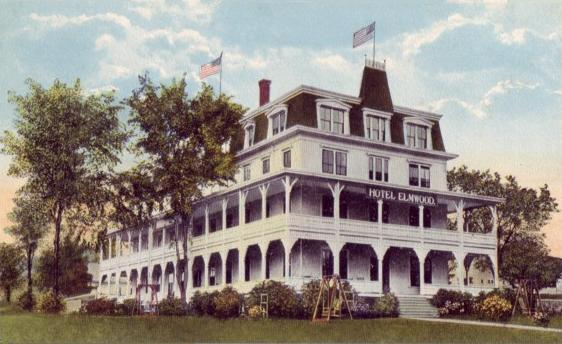
Hotel Elmwood c. 1915

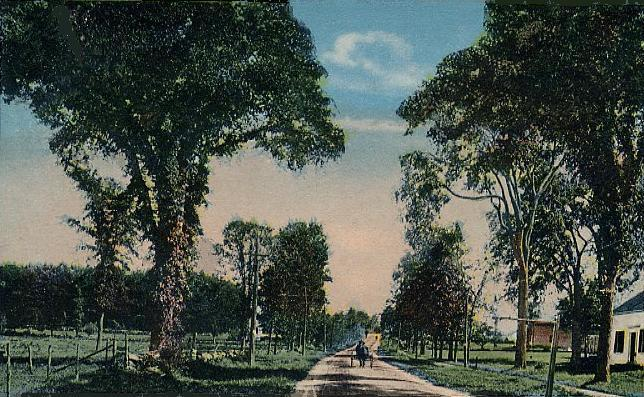
South Main Street c. 1915

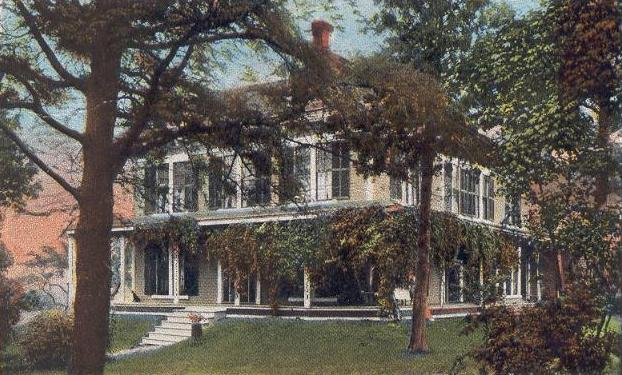
Huggins Hospital in 1916

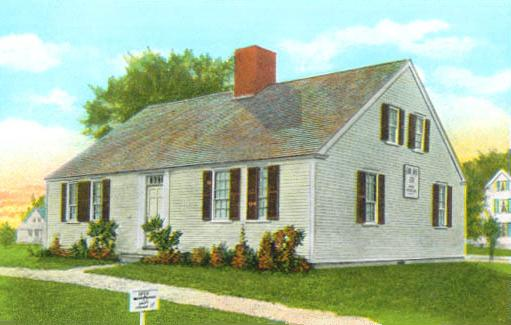
Clark House c. 1920

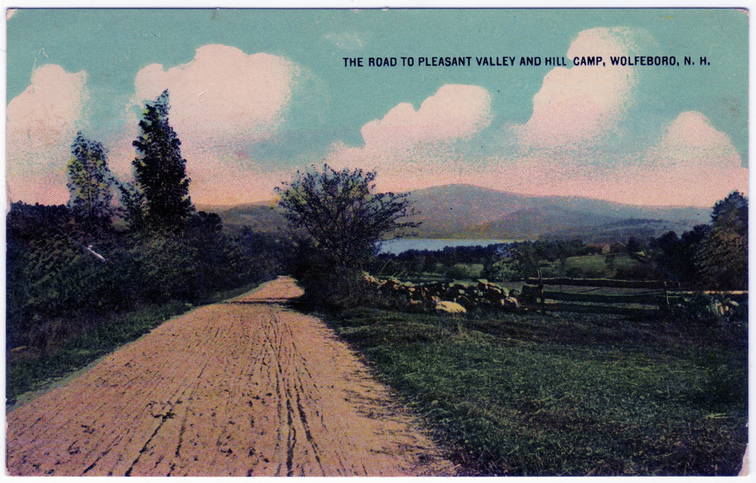
Road to Pleasant Valley and the Hill Camp c. 1925

== Sites of interest ==
- Clark House (1778)
- Monitor Engine Company Firehouse
- MS Mount Washington
- New Hampshire Boat Museum
- Pleasant Valley Schoolhouse (c. 1805)
- Wright Museum of WWII History
- Wolfeboro Public Library Postcard Archive

On the National Register of Historic Places:

- Brewster Memorial Hall
- Cotton Mountain Community Church
- Libby Museum
- Pickering House

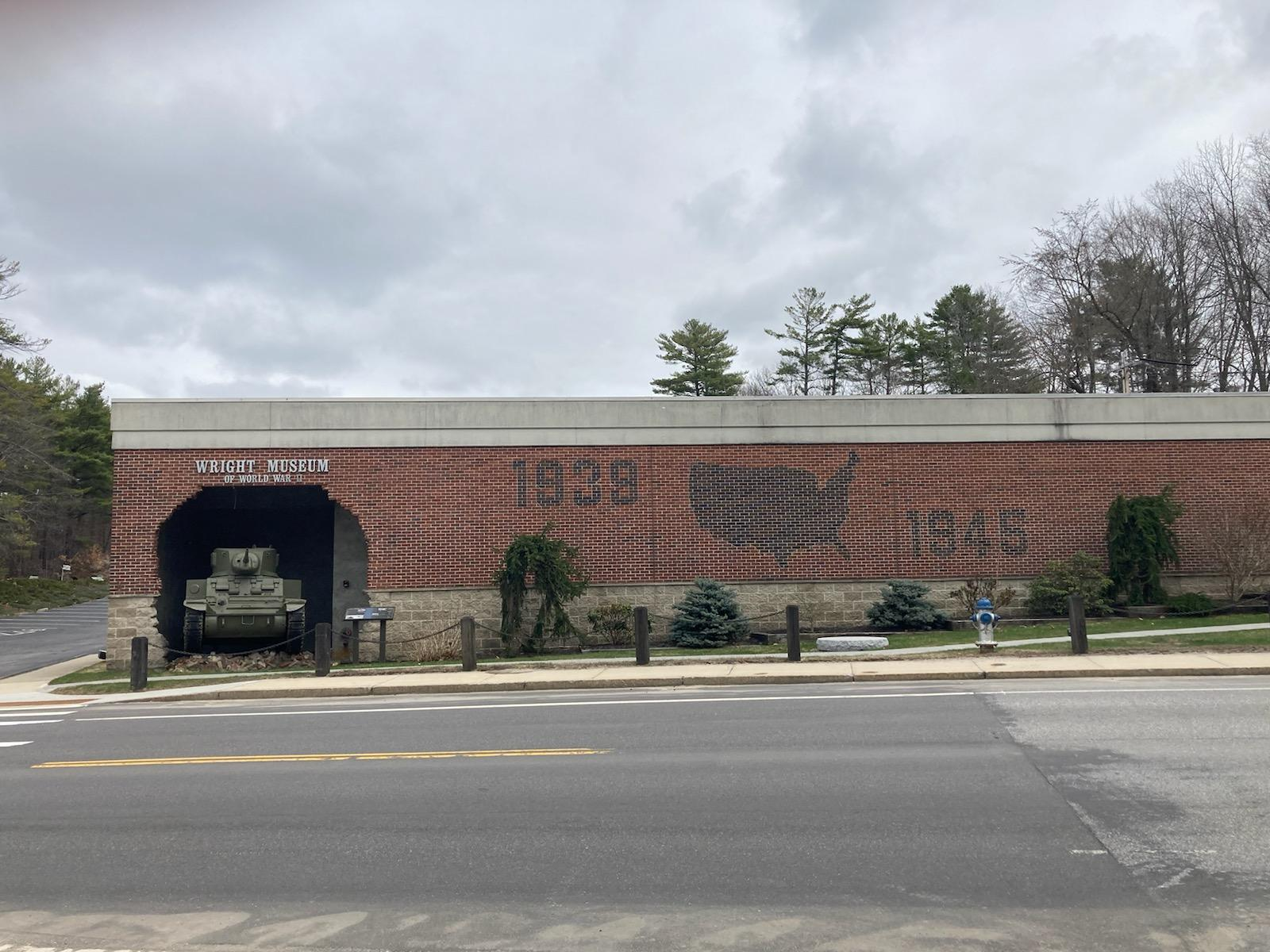
Wright Museum of World War II History

== Notable people ==
- John J. Ballentine (1927–2016), member of the New Hampshire House of Representatives
- Jeb Bradley (born 1952), Majority Leader of the New Hampshire Senate; US congressman (2003–2007)
- Tim Corbin (born 1961), head coach of Vanderbilt Commodores baseball, two-time NCAA champion
- James Foley (1973–c. 2014), war correspondent during the Syrian Civil War, he was killed by the Islamic State of Iraq and Syria (ISIS)
- Robbie Ftorek (born 1952), former NHL coach of four teams
- J. W. "Bill" Marriott, Jr. (born 1932), chairman of the board of Marriott International
- Dennis Moran (1982–2013), a.k.a. "Coolio" and/or "Sinned", computer hacker
- Mitt Romney (born 1947), 70th governor of Massachusetts, U.S. senator from Utah
- Mike Ryan (1941–2020), catcher with the Boston Red Sox, Philadelphia Phillies, and Pittsburgh Pirates
- Soong Mei-ling (1898–2003), wife of Republic of China President Chiang Kai-shek
- Sir John Wentworth, 1st Baronet (1737–1820), provincial governor of New Hampshire (summer resident)
