= John J. Ballentine (politician) =

English-American politician

- Ballentine in 1946

Member of the New Hampshire House of Representatives
- In office 1954–1955

Personal details
- Born: John Joseph Ballentine; April 2, 1927 Didsbury, Manchester, England
- Died: April 27, 2006 (aged 79) Dover, New Hampshire, U.S.
- Party: Republican
- Education: Syracuse University; University of Minnesota

John Joseph Ballentine (April 2, 1927 – April 27, 2006) was an English-American politician. A member of the Republican Party, he served in the New Hampshire House of Representatives from 1954 to 1955.

== Life and career ==
Ballentine was born in Didsbury, Manchester, the son of Joseph Ballentine and Winifred Knight. At an early age, he emigrated to the United States with his parents, settling in Wolfeboro, New Hampshire. He attended Syracuse University, earning his AB degree in journalism. He also attended the University of Minnesota, earning his MA degree in political science.

Ballentine served in the New Hampshire House of Representatives from 1954 to 1955.

== Death ==
Ballentine died on April 27, 2006, at the Wentworth-Douglass Hospital in Dover, New Hampshire, at the age of 79.
