= Wolfeboro Falls, New Hampshire =

Unincorporated community in New Hampshire, United States

- Unincorporated community
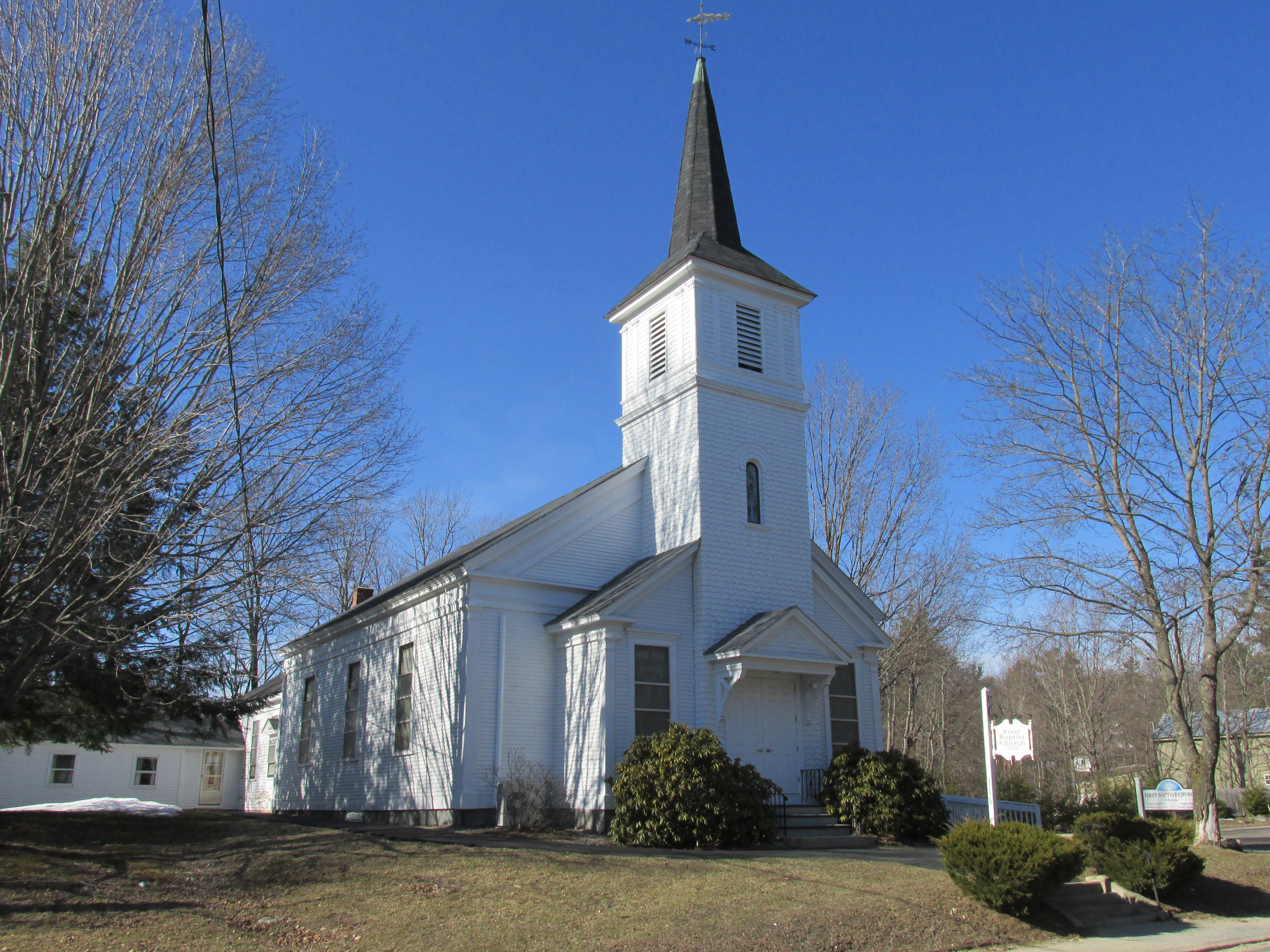
- First Baptist Church

- Location within New Hampshire Location within the United States
- Coordinates: 43°35′26″N 71°12′18″W
- Country: United States
- State: New Hampshire
- County: Carroll
- Town: Wolfeboro
- Elevation: 518 ft (158 m)
- Time zone: UTC-5 (Eastern (EST))
  - Summer (DST): UTC-4 (EDT)
- ZIP code: 03896
- Area code: 603
- GNIS feature ID: 870972

Wolfeboro Falls is an unincorporated community in the town of Wolfeboro in Carroll County, New Hampshire, United States. It is located 0.5 miles (0.8 km) north of the center of Wolfeboro, on the strip of land separating Front Bay (connecting to Lake Winnipesaukee) from Crescent Lake (connecting to Lake Wentworth). The stream connecting the two lakes, known as the "Smith River", drops 28 feet (8.5 m) over its 0.3-mile (0.5 km) course.

New Hampshire Route 28 passes through the village, leading to Ossipee to the north and Alton to the south. New Hampshire Route 109A leaves Route 28 at the center of the village, heading northwest towards Center Tuftonboro and Melvin Village.

Wolfeboro Falls has a ZIP code of 03896, different from the rest of the town of Wolfeboro.
