= Wentworth State Park =

Public recreation area in Wolfeboro, New Hampshire

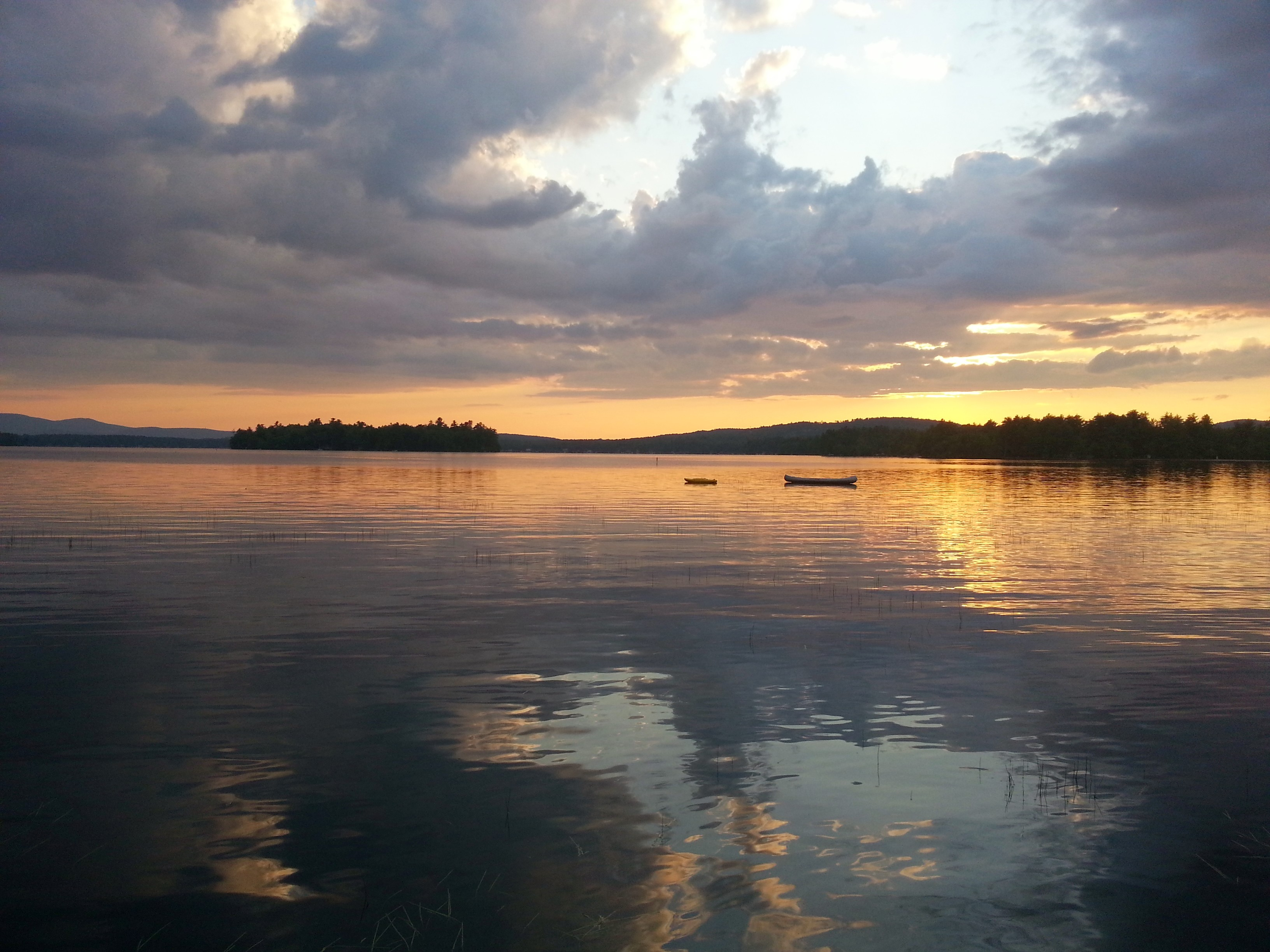
- A view of Lake Wentworth

- Location within New Hampshire
- Interactive map of Wentworth State Park
- Location: Wolfeboro, New Hampshire, United States
- Coordinates: 43°36′47″N 71°08′52″W
- Area: 50 acres (20 ha)
- Elevation: 535 feet (163 m)
- Established: 1934
- Administrator: New Hampshire Division of Parks and Recreation
- Website: Official website
- New Hampshire State Parks

Wentworth State Park is a 50-acre (20 ha) public recreation area on the north shore of Lake Wentworth in Wolfeboro, New Hampshire. Activities include swimming, picnicking, non-motorized boating, and fishing. Amenities include picnic tables, grills, flush toilets and a group use area.
