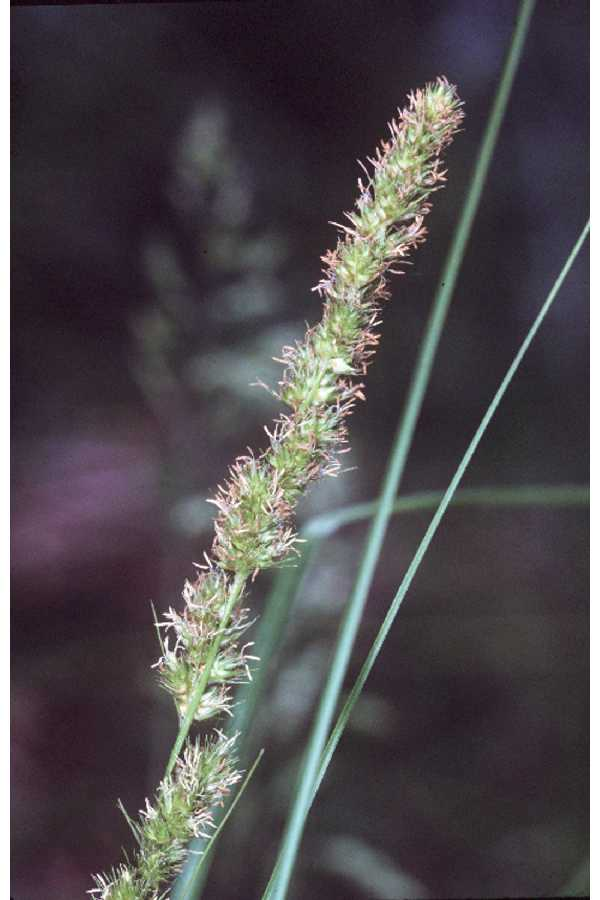
- In flower

Conservation status
- Least Concern (IUCN 3.1)

Scientific classification
- Kingdom: Plantae
- Clade: Embryophytes
- Clade: Tracheophytes
- Clade: Angiosperms
- Clade: Monocots
- Clade: Commelinids
- Order: Poales
- Family: Cyperaceae
- Genus: Carex
- Subgenus: Carex subg. Vignea
- Section: Carex sect. Multiflorae
- Species: C. vulpinoidea

Binomial name
- Carex vulpinoidea Michx.

= Carex vulpinoidea =

Species of grass-like plant

Carex vulpinoidea is a species of sedge known as fox sedge and American fox-sedge. It is native to North America, including most of Canada, the Dominican Republic, the United States and parts of Mexico. It is known in Europe and New Zealand as an introduced species. The sedge lives in wet and seasonally wet habitat, and grows easily as a roadside weed. It produces clumps of stems up to a meter tall. The inflorescence is a dense, tangled cluster of many flower spikes up to about 10 cm (3.9 in) long. Tolerates fluctuating water levels and periods of drying.

== Ecology ==
Carex vulpinoidea serves as a host plant for Skipper butterflies and attracts birds.
