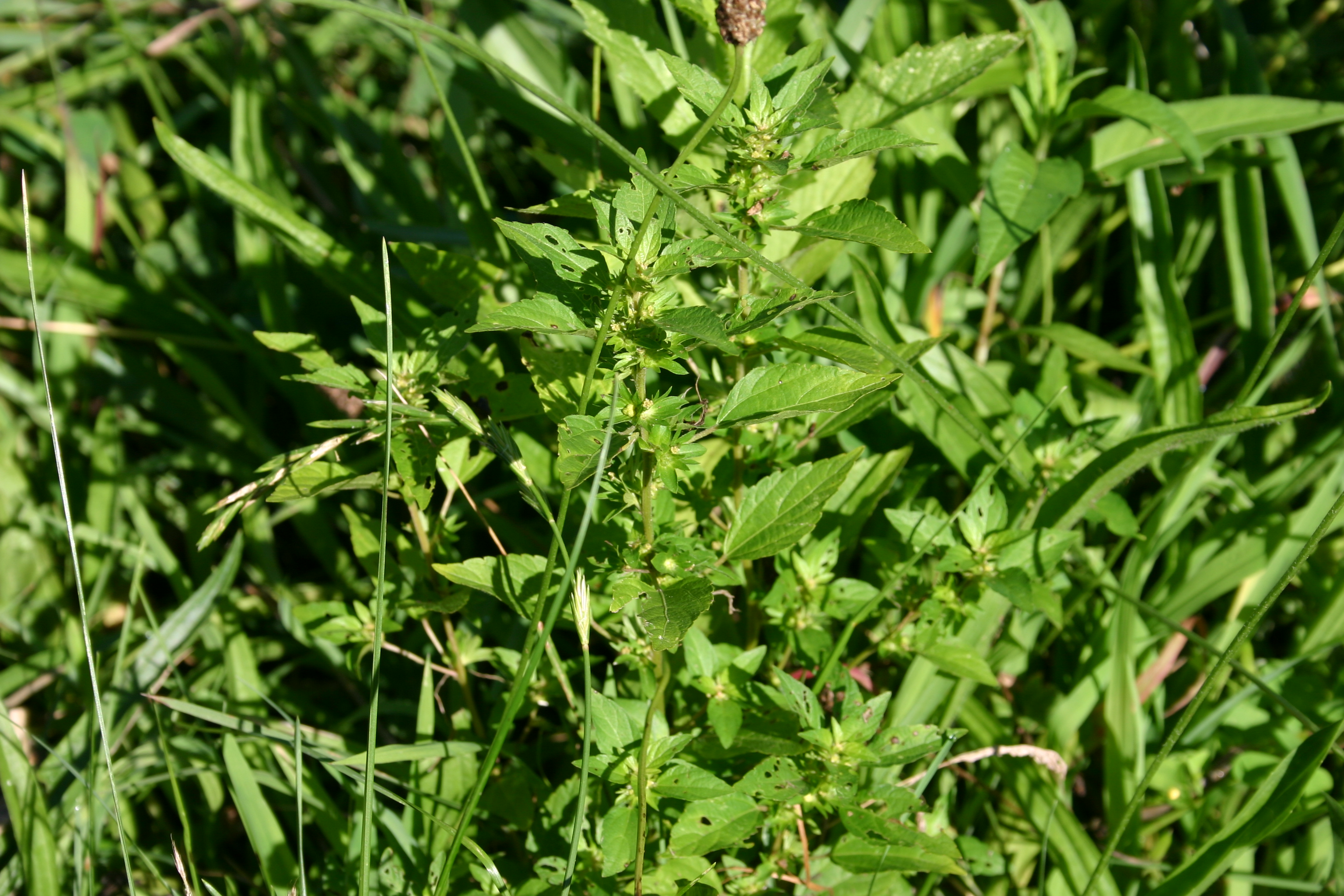

Conservation status
- Secure (NatureServe)

Scientific classification
- Kingdom: Plantae
- Clade: Tracheophytes
- Clade: Angiosperms
- Clade: Eudicots
- Clade: Rosids
- Order: Malpighiales
- Family: Euphorbiaceae
- Genus: Acalypha
- Species: A. rhomboidea

Binomial name
- Acalypha rhomboidea Raf.
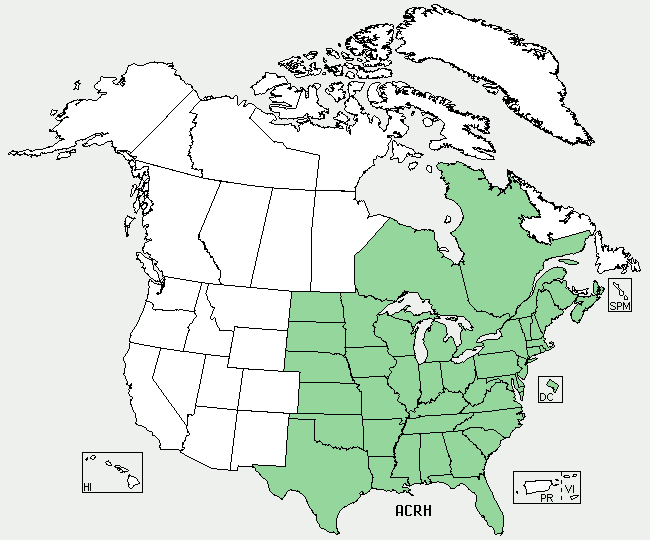
- Acalypha rhomboidea distribution

Synonyms
- Acalypha urticifolia Raf.; Acalypha virginica L. forma intermedia Millsp.; Acalypha virginica L. var. rhombifolia Riddell; Acalypha virginica L. var. rhomboidea (Raf.)

= Acalypha rhomboidea =

Species of flowering plant

Acalypha rhomboidea is an annual plant in the spurge family, Euphorbiaceae. It is known by the common names common three-seeded mercury, rhombic three-seeded-mercury, rhomboid mercury, copperleaf, rhombic copper-leaf, three-seeded-mercury, ricinelle rhomboide, and diamond threeseed mercury. Synonyms include Acalypha urticifolia Raf., Acalypha virginica L. forma intermedia Millsp., Acalypha virginica L. var. rhombifolia Riddell, Acalypha virginica L. var. rhomboidea (Raf.) Cooperr..

The species name rhomboidea means "diamond-shaped", and describes the leaves.

== Description ==
Common three-seeded mercury is an annual herbaceous plant. It grows from a taproot, reaching 15–60 cm (1/2–2 ft) tall, and is usually without branches. The central stem can be either covered with fine white hairs or hairless. The lanceolate to lanceolate-rhombic acute leaves are alternate with slightly hairy petioles about 4 cm (1 1/2 in) long, bluntly serrated margins, and pinnate venation. Leaves are deep green and somewhat shiny above, light green and mostly hairless below and can be up to 7 cm (2 3/4 in) long and 4 cm (1 1/2 in) wide. There is a tendency for the leaves to cluster near the top of the stem or stems. A conspicuous, slightly ciliate bract with 5–9 lobes is located where the leaf petiole meets the stem. This bract wraps around the inflorescence, which consists of a green cyathium. The cyathium contains minute staminate and pistillate flowers lacking petals. Male flowers terminate the peduncle with capitate clusters. The flowers consists of four tiny golden green upwardly bent sepals, acute to blunt in shape, and many stamens. Female flowers consist of minute green sepals, a hairy tri-locular ovary, and three fringed styles. One seed per locule is produced. The mature pods are tan colored, 1.6–1.8 mm (1/16–5/64 in) long, and deeply lobed. There is no floral scent associated with the flowers.

This plant is somewhat unusual in that it has clear sap as opposed to the typically milky sap of other members of Euphorbiaceae.

Acalypha rhomboidea is quite similar to Acalypha virginica. The two may be distinguished by the number of lobes on the bracts; the latter has 9–15 lobes whereas the former has only 5–9. Acalypha rhomboidea also resembles young redroot pigweed (Amaranthus retroflexus L.), but may be distinguished from the latter by the flower clusters, bracts, and occasionally bronze-green leaves of the former.

== Distribution and habitat ==
Acalypha rhomboidea is native to Eastern Canada and the Northeastern, Southeastern, and Central United States.

This plant often grows in fertile loam, but it will tolerate gravelly or clay soil as well. It prefers disturbed areas. Three-seeded mercury can be found growing in moist to mesic black soil prairie, openings or lightly shaded areas of upland and floodplain forest, thickets, seeps, riverbanks and lake shores, limestone glades and bluffs, fields, fence rows, roadside and railroad right-of-ways, vacant lots, and waste areas.

== Ecology ==
The blooming period for this plant is roughly mid-summer until fall frost, and the flowering period lasts for one or more months.

The seeds are an attractive food source for birds such as the mourning dove and greater prairie chicken. Deer are known to browse Acalypha spp.

In crop fields where group 2 herbicides have been repeatedly used, this plant can become a serious and damaging weed.
