= Lake Wentworth =

Lake in New Hampshire, United States

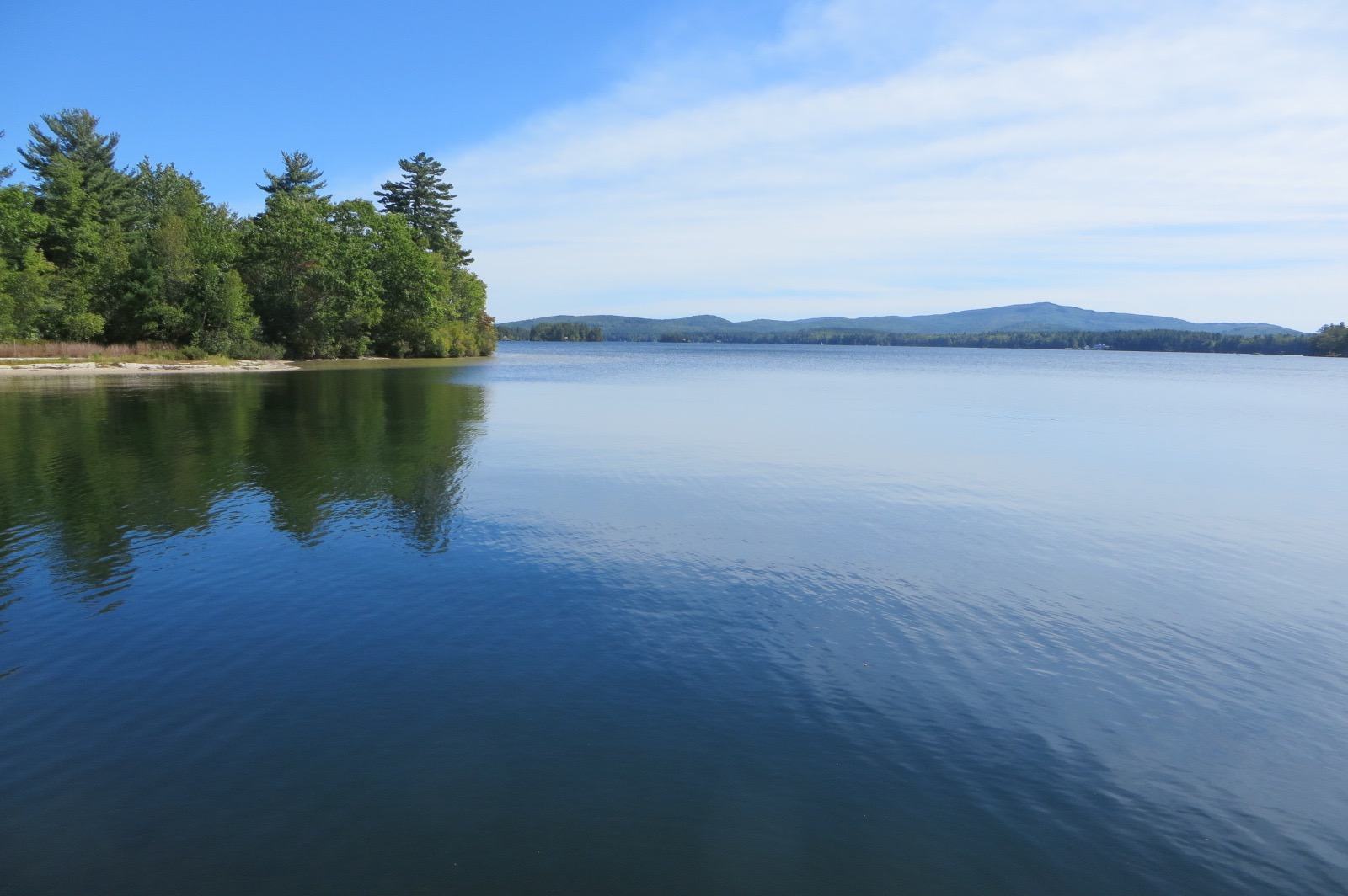
- Lake Wentworth from west end near Fernalds Basin, Wolfeboro, NH

- Location within New Hampshire Location within the United States
- Location: Carroll County, New Hampshire
- Coordinates: 43°35′50″N 71°9′36″W
- Type: Glacial
- Primary inflows: 9 named brooks
- Primary outflows: Smith River to Crescent Lake
- Basin countries: United States
- Max. length: 3.9 mi (6.3 km)
- Max. width: 2.2 mi (3.5 km)
- Surface area: 3,097 acres (12.53 km^{2})
- Average depth: 25 feet (7.6 m)
- Max. depth: 80 feet (24 m) at Fullers Deep
- Shore length^{1}: 20 miles (32 km)
- Surface elevation: 534 ft (163 m)
- Islands: 18
- Settlements: Wolfeboro
- ^{1} Shore length is not a well-defined measure.

Lake Wentworth is located in Carroll County in eastern New Hampshire, United States, in the town of Wolfeboro. At 3,097 acres (12.53 km^{2}), it is the seventh-largest lake located entirely in New Hampshire. Water from Lake Wentworth flows through the short Smith River into Crescent Lake and then over the dam into Lake Winnipesaukee in Wolfeboro. The 50-acre (20 ha) Wentworth State Park offers public access to the lake.

== Geography and water quality ==
The Wentworth-Crescent watershed is a sub-watershed of the Lake Winnipesaukee watershed and the greater Merrimack River watershed. The three major water bodies, Sargents Pond, Crescent Lake, and Lake Wentworth, and 11 year-round tributaries are included in the 37-square-mile (96 km^{2}) sub-watershed, containing over 4,000 acres (16 km^{2}) of surface water, 617 acres (2.50 km^{2}) of wetlands, and over 15 miles (24 km) of shoreline. The Wentworth Watershed Association works to protect the land and surface waters of this sub-watershed.

Lake Wentworth is part of the UNH Extension Lakes Lay Monitoring Program, a volunteer water sampling program. Water quality data has been collected since 1984. Lake Wentworth is considered oligotrophic, with excellent water quality, except at its deepest points where it is considered mesotrophic, in fair condition due to low dissolved oxygen levels.

The lake is classified as a warmwater fishery, with observed species including rainbow trout, smallmouth and largemouth bass, chain pickerel, horned pout, and white perch.

== Islands ==
There are at least 18 named islands in the lake: Stamp Act Island (the largest at 106 acres (43 ha)), Bass Island, Cate Island, Mink Island, Goose Island, East and West Jockey Cap Islands, Triggs Island, Turtle Island, Fanny Island, Brummet Island, and a group known as the Seven Sisters Islands: Sister Island, Poplar Island, Loon Island, Flo Island, Wal Island, Min Island, and Joe Island. There are numerous additional ledges, rocks, and islets in the lake.

=== Bass Island ===
The seventh largest of the islands, its name comes from the most dominant fish in the lake. Its original name was Goss Island, named after its original owner, Walter Goss. There is now one house on the island. The island is connected to Stamp Act Island through an underwater reef.

=== Brummitt Island ===
One of the smallest islands ever to be inhabited, but now the island does not have any house on it. The island was originally inhabited by Henry D. Brewster, and was originally called Townsend's Islands, named after the shore to which it is the closest.

=== Cate Island ===
Named after the Cate family, who owned a piece of Stamp Act Island. The island has been called in the past Thaddeus Island and Murray's Island. The earliest owners of the island were C.A. Senter, I.P. Whitehouse, and J.E. Murray; one of them built the camp that burned down in a fire in 1929. The fire was apparently caused by a bolt of lightning which could be clearly seen from Turtle Island at the time.

=== Goose and Fanny Island ===
Two uninhabited islands close to the shore. Fanny Island is off Kimball Shore, and Goose Island is off Hodge Shore.

=== Mink Island and the Jockey Caps ===
Mink Island is named after the mink, an animal which has been spotted repeatedly on the island. Almost 100 years ago its name was Wentworth Island. The Jockey Cap islands are named after the headgear of horse-racing. The Spear family built a cabin on East Jockey Cap over 100 years ago, and around that same time there was also a cabin on West Jockey Cap.

=== Seven Sister Islands ===
The Seven Sister Islands are Sister, Poplar, Loon, Flo, Min, Joe, and Wal. Poplar Island belonged to C.B. Edgerly and J.M. Cate until 1881. It was then sold to Rev. F.H. Spear in 1910, who put up the first building (a boathouse), which is now a part of camp 2. Sister Island was originally owned by Daniel "Old Dan" Kimball, who had a little cabin in the middle of the island where he stayed overnight at certain times. Sister Island used to be called Wakefield Island after John F. Wakefield (a later owner). Wakefield set up the system of buoys with a guide, John A. Jackson. Loon Island used to have Estes Hotel which was run by John Estes. The Estes Hotel was known for its crazy parties. On Wal and Flo islands loons now nest.

=== Stamp Act Island ===
Stamp Act is the largest of all the islands. It was originally owned by Mrs. H.G. Davenport and Mrs. Maude Cate. It is now a nature preserve owned by The Nature Conservancy. The island was sold in the 1970s, and at one time there was fear of the island being sold to a private contractor who could have built 70 lots on the island. Nobody knows how the island's name came to be, though it refers to the eighteenth century acts of the British Parliament which sparked the American Revolution. Some rumors are that one of its original owners was a distributor of stamps, another rumor was that Governor John Wentworth played a major part in the repeal of the Stamp Act, and finally some people have said that Stamp Act documents or stamps were hidden there. There used to be a house on the northern tip of the island, but it was torn down when the island was sold. A story has been passed around that many years ago a man and his partner made a deal with Mrs. Davenport that they cut down 50 trees. They cut down 49 trees, and the fiftieth tree toppled and killed them both. The fiftieth tree was not on Mrs. Davenport's property; it was on Maude Cates' property.

=== Triggs Island ===
The second largest island in the lake, close to the Triggs Shore. Triggs takes its name from the family that long owned island. It used to be called Minister's Island because it used to be home to many clergymen. The island was sold to Thomas W. Clow in 1904, who sold the island to three Methodist ministers. They built five cottages, but sold the house on the conditions that the new owners not drink alcoholic beverages on the island, and that if anyone would like to sell their property they would have to allow any other resident of Triggs to buy the house first. Triggs is one of two islands with electricity, from an underwater tube with multiple wires running through it.

=== Turtle Island ===
The sixth largest island in the lake, it is less than 100 yards away from the shore. Lady Wentworth used to picnic with her family and friends. They used to get to the island through a natural causeway which some speculate was made by the Wentworth family at their time. The island is the only other island with electricity, and it gets that with a wire going over the water to the island.

== See also ==
- List of lakes in New Hampshire
