= Chocorua =

Chocorua may refer to a place name in the White Mountains of New Hampshire, United States:

- Mount Chocorua, a distinctive rocky summit
- Chocorua, New Hampshire, a village in the town of Tamworth near the mountain
- Chocorua Lake, at the base of the mountain
- The Chocorua River, the outlet of Chocorua Lake

== Other uses ==
- a genus of spiders; synonym of Diplocephalus
