= Bikini Bandits =

- Directed by: Steven Grasse
- Written by: Steven Grasse; Peter Grasse
- Produced by: Steven Grasse
- Starring: Maynard James Keenan; Dee Dee Ramone; Jello Biafra; Corey Feldman; Gary the Retard; Hank the Angry Drunken Dwarf
- Cinematography: Rhet W. Bear
- Production company: Image Entertainment
- Distributed by: Revolver Entertainment
- Release date: 2002
- Running time: 55 minutes
- Country: United States
- Language: English

Bikini Bandits (also known as The Bikini Bandits Experience) is a 2002 cult comedy film written and directed by Steven Grasse. The screenplay was co-written by Peter Grasse. The film stars Maynard James Keenan, Dee Dee Ramone, Jello Biafra and Corey Feldman. The story follows a team of female bandits who go on a crime spree in defiance of corporate America.

== Plot ==
Sent to hell after their car goes off a cliff, the Bikini Bandits make a deal with the Devil. In order to secure their freedom, they must find and defile the Virgin Mary. Along the way they run into various obstacles, as the Pope and the angel Gabriel attempt to stop them. Interspliced throughout are ads for the fictional big-box company, "G-Mart".

== Cast ==
- Maynard James Keenan as Satan
- Dee Dee Ramone as The Pope / Self
- Jello Biafra as Evil Porn Director
- Corey Feldman as Angel Gabriel / Self
- Gary the Retard as Self
- Hank the Angry Drunken Dwarf as Mini Devil

=== Bikini Bandits ===
- Heather-Victoria Ray
- Heather McDonnell
- Cynthia Diaz
- Betty San Luis

== Production ==
Bikini Bandits was produced as part of The Arcadia Project, a viral marketing project by Quaker City Mercantile named after Walter Benjamin's Arcades Project. The film was produced as a satirical commentary on the representation of women in advertising.

The feature-length film was based on a web series of the same name which was released on Atom Films. Steven Grasse began writing the Bikini Bandits series in 1999 with the help of his brother, Peter Grasse. The series, which focused on a group of scantily clad female bandits, developed an underground following. According to IGN, the French government helped to fund the Bikini Bandit's production. A separate feature-length film produced by StudioCanal was planned but never made.

Keenan, a fan of the webseries, contacted Grasse to direct a music video for A Perfect Circle. After discussing the Bikini Bandits with Grasse, he agreed to star in the film as Satan. The film's soundtrack features original music written by Ramone, as well as tracks by post-rock band Trans Am and Peaches.

== Release and sequels ==
Bikini Bandits debuted at the 2002 Philadelphia Film Festival. Following its theatrical release, the film gained a following online and became considered a cult classic. The Bikini Bandits Experience was released on DVD in 2003, including special features and the short films in the web series.

In 2003, the film was screened at the Raindance Film Festival, and Portobello Film Festival in London, and the Oldenburg International Film Festival in Germany.

An anthology titled Bikini Bandits: Briefs, Shorts & Panties was released on October 25, 2004, which included content from The Bikini Bandits Experience and the web series. Keenan reprised his role as Satan in the 2004 film Bikini Bandits 2: Goldenrod. An animated sequel titled The Bikini Bandits Save Christmas was released in 2004.

== Reception ==
The film received generally positive reviews and currently has a 62% score on Rotten Tomatoes. The film's concept was praised, as was Ramone's performance as the Pope, although some critics felt the plot was thin in places.

Greg Heller of Rolling Stone described the film as "a breasts-intensive homage to schlock icon Russ Meyer." In a review of the Portobello Film Festival, Ewan Sanderson wrote "Bikini Bandits is a brazenly crass, gratuitous and hugely enjoyable cocktail of flesh, guns and filthy innuendo."

Noah Roblschon of Entertainment Weekly wrote that the film "is as tawdry as a late-night Cinemax guilty pleasure — but with less nudity, fancier editing, and one set of rotten teeth."
