= Katherine Sleeper Walden =

American environmental activist (1862–1949)

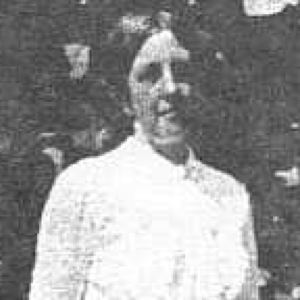
- Katherine c. 1910
- Born: Katherine Sleeper; November 27, 1862; Roxbury, Massachusetts, U.S.
- Died: March 3, 1949 (aged 86); Wonalancet, New Hampshire, U.S.
- Resting place: Wonalancet Union Chapel, Wonalancet, New Hampshire, United States
- Occupations: Reporter; Innkeeper; Conservationist; Activist; Community Organizer
- Known for: Environmental conservation activism
- Spouse: Arthur Treadwell Walden (m. 1902)

Katherine Sleeper Walden (November 27, 1862 – March 3, 1949) was an American environmental conservationist and community activist in Wonalancet, New Hampshire. Before moving to New Hampshire in 1890, Katherine was an active community member and among the first female journalists in Massachusetts.

Following her arrival in New Hampshire, Katherine founded Wonalancet Farm and the Wonalancet Out Door Club and married famed explorer and dog breeder Arthur Treadwell Walden in 1902. Her conservation efforts and fight against New England's "Timber Barons" succeeded in protecting thousands of acres of old-growth forest in the White Mountains.

As a result of financial troubles resulting from the Great Depression and Katherine's declining health, Katherine and Arthur were forced to sell Wonalancet Farm and move to nearby Brook Walden. There, a fire broke out and trapped Katherine inside. While rescuing her and attempting to extinguish the fire, Arthur was killed. Katherine was unable to recover from the emotional and physical trauma; she died two years later.

The Sleepers, a pair of mountains in the White Mountains, and nearby Mount Katherine are named after Katherine. The Kate Sleeper Trail, which traverses both peaks of The Sleepers, is also named for her.

== Early life ==
Katherine Sleeper Walden, born Katherine Sleeper, was born on November 27, 1862, in the Greater Boston area and was the daughter of Zilpha Loring Thomas and Charles Frederick Sleeper. The Sleepers were a well-respected and wealthy family in the Boston area. Katherine's grandfather, John Sherburne Sleeper, was a sailor, shipmaster, children's book author, journalist, newspaper editor, and politician. He held public office as mayor of Roxbury and as a Massachusetts state senator.

In 1872, when Katherine was ten years old, her mother died. This caused Katherine and her father to move into the home of Katherine's grandfather in Roxbury. In Roxbury, Katherine completed her education, participated in the community, attended the Berlitz School for French, learned music, and avidly participated in a local women's athletic club. She frequented the Chocorua area of Tamworth to visit family and came to love the White Mountains of rural New Hampshire through these trips.

At the beginning of her adult life, Katherine began working in her father's newspaper and became a journalist. Her journalistic career began within a decade of when the first woman to be employed in a writing role at a Boston newspaper, Sallie Joy White, was hired by the Boston Press.

== Arrival at Wonalancet ==
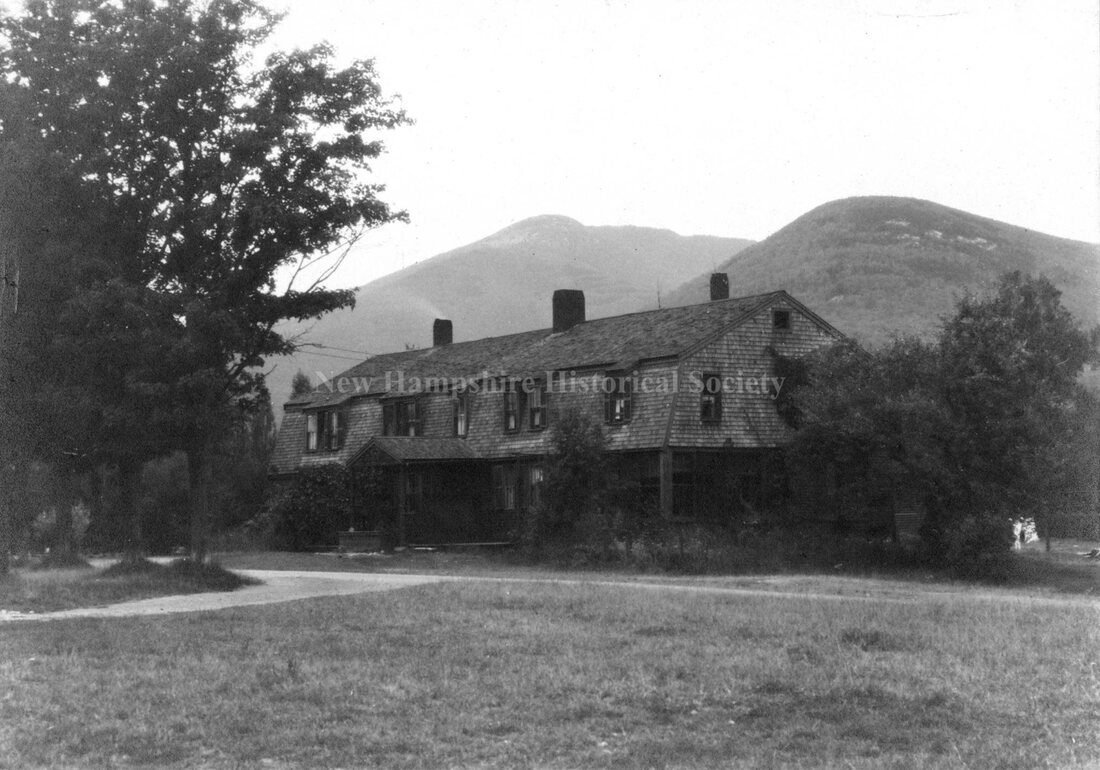
Wonalancet Farm in 1911

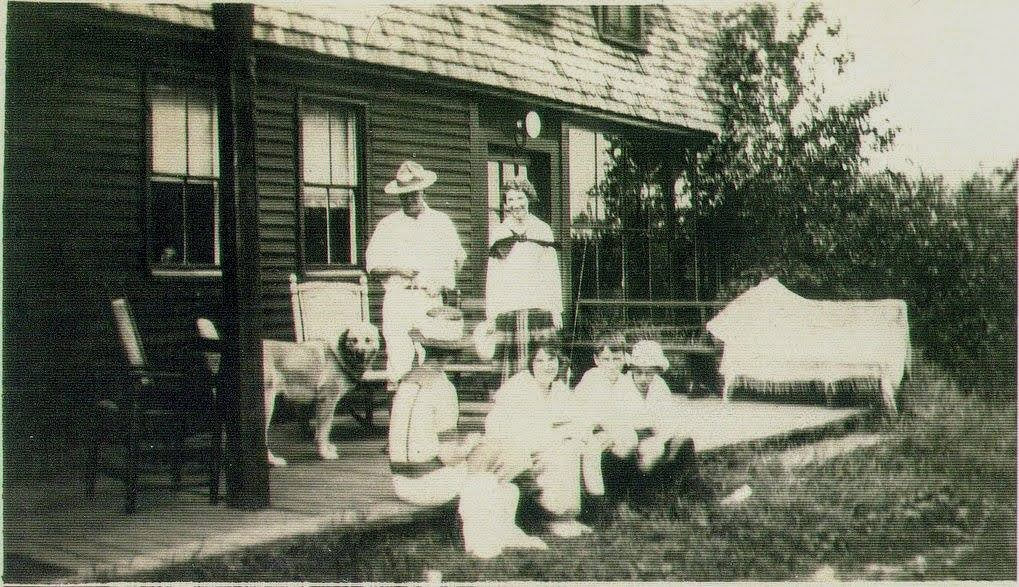
Chinook, Arthur, Katherine, and neighbors on their porch at Wonalancet Farm

In 1890, Katherine was faced with serious health complications and so, following a doctor's recommendation that she leave the city, took an extended trip to Tamworth, New Hampshire. While at a local boarding house, Katherine decided to open an inn in the area. During her time in Tamworth she grew close to her friend and cousin by marriage, Arthur Treadwell Walden.

Katherine was 28 at the time but often claimed that she was much younger. Her claims of youth are generally attributed to her wishing to appear closer in age to her friend, Arthur, who was 10 years her younger. She is believed to have been under five feet tall and was described by contemporaries as having a "high-pitched" voice and being generally youthful to such an extent that she was "by tradition eighteen years old."

Arthur and Katherine went to the small settlement of Birch Intervale, and Katherine decided to purchase Theophilous Brown's 1,300-acre (530 ha) farm on the south side of Sandwich Ridge, which included 600 acres (240 ha) of cleared fields, 700 acres (280 ha) of woodland, and a farmhouse built in 1814 that Katherine believed was ideal for being transitioned into an inn. Once in sight of the property, Katherine famously announced, "This is where I'm going to live!" Katherine named the property Wonalancet Farm after a poem by Lucy Larcom, who was herself enamored by the White Mountains.

She hired Arthur to manage the new Wonalancet Farm and maintain the farm's crops while she ran the inn. In managing the farm's large property, Arthur was given the opportunity and means to breed and train sled dogs. These efforts produced the Chinook breed, which is now the official state dog breed of New Hampshire.

== Conservationism, activism, and volunteerism ==
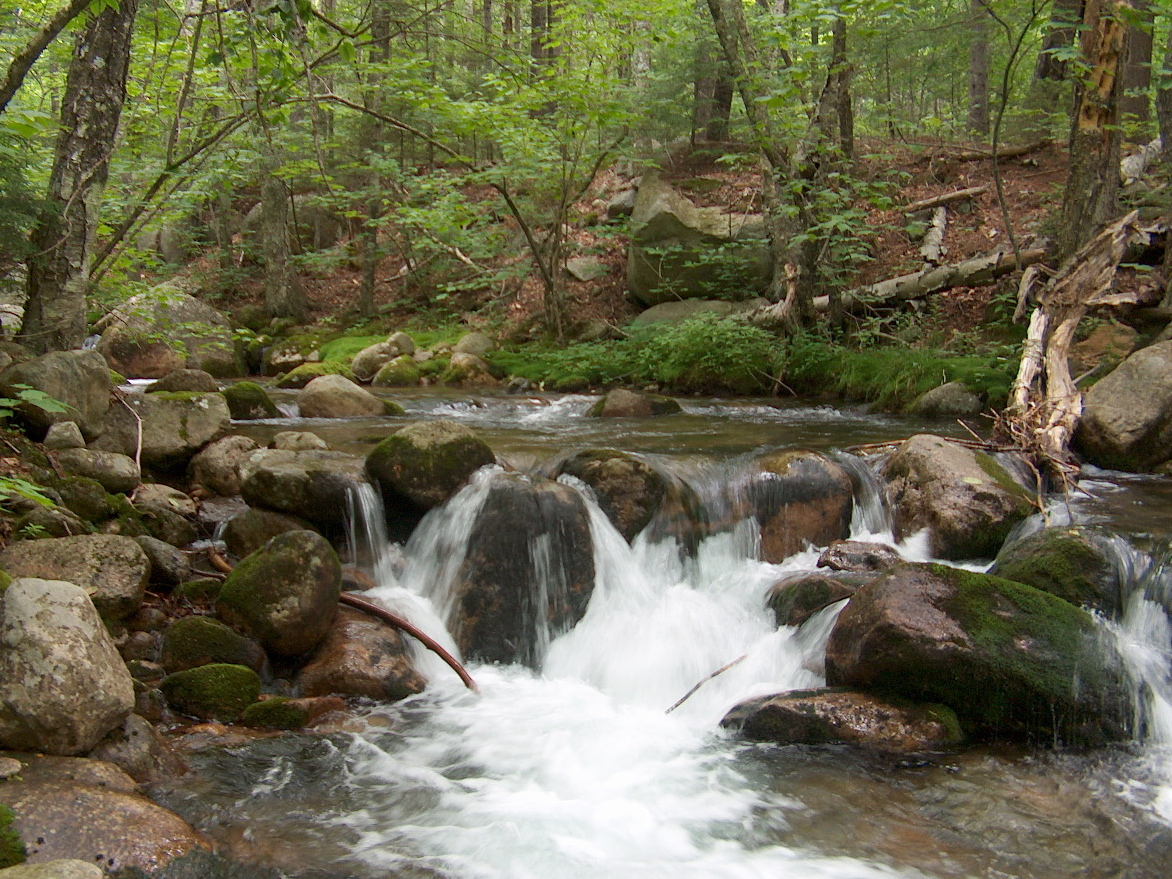
The Wonalancet River

=== Revitalizing and organizing Wonalancet ===
During the winter of 1890–91, Katherine made major renovations on the farmhouse and quickly became a respected member of the community. That August, Appalachian Mountain Club (AMC) President Charles E. Fay and Councilor William Ladd stayed at the inn during a visit to the area. Katherine believed that the town of Birch Intervale, which was nicknamed "Poverty Flats", could be revitalized by accommodating a tourism industry that had yet to exist in the White Mountains, and thus invited the visiting AMC officers to meet with local landowners at Wonalancet Farm. At this meeting, Katherine explained the AMC's work in creating trails throughout the country to locals and pitched the idea of clearing a hiking path from the village to the summit of Mount Passaconaway.

After persuading the town, Katherine organized the AMC leaders and a group of local farmers to meet a few days later to work on the proposed Dicey's Mill Trail path. That path remains the most popular on the mountain. In the subsequent years, Katherine organized efforts to clear and beautify residents' properties, repair the town's roadways, and renovate the local chapel. In 1893, Katherine made the decision that Birch Intervale would benefit from a post office and thus became the town's first postmistress. In order to avoid confusion with the nearby town of Intervale, Birch Intervale was renamed Wonalancet.

Katherine's encouragement of tourism showed its value within months as the trails found immediate success with reporters beginning to praise Wonalancet Farm as a worthwhile Summer destination. Wonalancet was soon regarded as being among the foremost rural destinations in New England. Newspapers referenced the natural beauty of the area with details of the newly built trails.

In 1898, to further encourage tourism and improve the area, Katherine successfully formed the Wonalancet Out Door Club (WODC), saying "Its purpose shall be the building and maintenance of paths, to improve the place and develop its natural beauties for the attraction of summer guests." The WODC cut paths, created maps, set guide boards, planted roadside trees, and established a campsite at the foot of a nearby mountain. Before 1891, no hiking trails or routes to the local summits existed. By 1901, at least nine unique trails were maintained for public use.

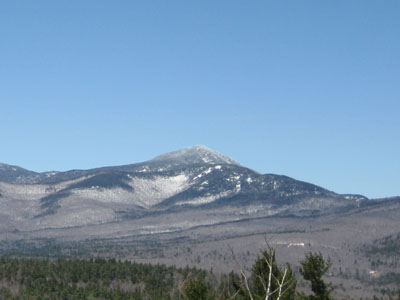
A view of Mount Passaconaway from Great Hill

By the time Katherine married Arthur Treadwell Walden in 1902, the couple had lived together for twelve years at Wonalancet Farm. The pair hosted and sponsored winter sports and activities, such as Arthur's pastime of dog sledding, long before other destinations in the northeast. Wonalancet quickly grew to be the foremost year-round tourist hub in the White Mountains, earning widespread fame.

Arthur also greatly contributed to the farm's popularity. His sled dogs and their breeding program gained national renown and attracted hundreds of visitors to Wonalancet. Interested visitors often received personal, in-depth tours from Arthur. The sustained fame of Wonalancet through to the modern day is in part a result of Arthur's renown and the notable impact he had on sled dog racing in New England.

=== Conservation of the White Mountains ===
By the 1880s, rural residents of New Hampshire were becoming increasingly alarmed by the widespread clearcutting and wildfires caused by unsustainable logging by New England's "Timber Barons" and the expansion of railroads through the state. A cycle began in which a large area of dense forest would be clearcut and the logging companies would leave downed logs, dried brush, and slashings littered on the ground. Hot coals and sparks from neighboring railways, which were laid to transport the newly cut lumber, would then ignite the readily supplied kindling. The WODC explained the situation and cause for alarm:

"Fires raged for days, and the billows of smoke were viewed with alarm; dust and smoke restricted visibility. Rapid water run-off from rain and melting snow brought on spring floods, and produced low water levels throughout the summer and fall."

By the spring of 1903, the wildfires alone had destroyed over 84,000 acres (34,000 ha) of forests in the White Mountains, accounting for over a tenth of the entire region. In response to the crisis, Congress enacted the Weeks Act of 1911, which created a new government commission called the United States Forest Service that was tasked with the protection of forests nationwide. The issue of land costs became the primary concern of the newly formed commission and where best to place the boundaries of newly formed National Forests. One protected area the commission created was the White Mountains National Forest. The White Mountains National Forest did not initially include the lands north of the town, known as the Bowl, which were the most popular to both residents and visitors.

In 1914, Katherine became aware of a logging company's intention to purchase the Bowl and the land surrounding it. She went to meet with the president of the Publishers Paper Company, who owned the area, and succeeded in persuading him to grant her an option on 3,000 acres (1,200 ha) in and surrounding the Bowl. The price of the region made it undesirable to the Forest Reservation Commission, but the WODC, Katherine, and countless other clubs and individuals succeeded in the protection of the Bowl.

That same year, Katherine organized a local festival to celebrate the centennial of her inn's construction and the passage of the Weeks Act. Later, during the First World War, she organized local women to create surgical dressings and clothing for those affected by the conflict. As a result of her efforts, the French government presented Katherine with an award.

== Later life ==
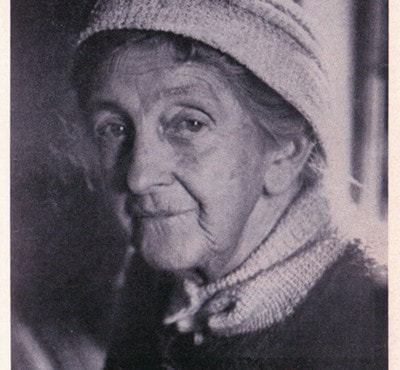
Katherine later in life

Katherine and Arthur ran Wonalancet Farm until the 1930s when they began facing financial difficulties due to the Great Depression and the automobile's impact on travel. They decided to retire and chose to move to nearby Brook Walden, a vacation home that Arthur's father had owned. Some sources instead claim that the couple's relocation was a result of Katherine's health deteriorating to the point of her becoming incapable of running the farm while Arthur was on an expedition to Antarctica. These sources allege that Katherine was evicted from the farmhouse and forcibly moved into a small cottage on the property by business partners who obtained power of attorney over Katherine in Arthur's absence. Further, they assert that Arthur was unable to retrieve their belongings from the house and had many of their sources of income taken. This ordeal, as reported, resulted in Arthur selling his share of the property and moving to Brook Walden.

Nevertheless, the couple experienced financial distress and left Wonalancet Farm in favor of Brook Walden. During this time, Katherine's health continued to deteriorate and she became largely incapable of walking. Arthur decided to retire from dog breeding and exploration to live a quiet life with and care for the infirm Katherine.

Despite financial difficulties and pervasive health issues, Katherine continued her conservation efforts. In 1934, she donated a further 215 acres (87 ha) of land to the White Mountains National Forest. She also owned a 57-acre (23 ha) tract of land on which the WODC created the trails of Gordon Path and Ainsworth Trail. This land was later sold and is now owned and maintained by the Lakes Region Conservation Trust and links Chinook Trail to the trails of the White Mountains National Forest.

On March 26, 1947, an oil burner inside Brook Walden caused a fire that quickly spread. Katherine was unable to walk due to her health and was thus unable to escape the house. Arthur, hearing Katherine's calls for help, rushed into the kitchen where she sat and carried her to safety. He then attempted to extinguish the fire but died in the attempt. Katherine is quoted as having said that Arthur "went as he would have liked to go, in a glory of flame." She never fully recovered from the mental trauma and physical injuries she sustained as a result of the fire and died two years later on March 3, 1949. She is buried with her husband in the graveyard at Wonalancet Union Chapel, a church she organized the reconstruction of.

== Legacy ==
Often considered Katherine's most important and lasting achievement was her fight against the New England "Timber Barons". This effort led to conservationist groups securing thousands of acres for the White Mountain National Forest and her successful protection of the Bowl. The Bowl, now officially called the Bowl Research Natural Area, is one of the last untouched old-growth forests in the American Northeast and is thus regarded as an important site for research. She is also remembered through her foundation of the Wonalancet Out Door Club and the revitalization of Wonalancet, New Hampshire. In response to Katherine's efforts at revitalizing Wonalancet and conserving the surrounding landscape, Edgar J. Rich, who had been an 1899 visitor to Wonalancet Farm and later became a wealthy patron of the Wonalancet Out Door Club and White Mountains National Forest, said:

"Wonalancet is not a geographical expression, it is a spirit, and it owes its existence to a young woman who came here twenty years ago – Miss Katherine Sleeper"

In 1958, Majory Gane Harkness, about the significance of Katherine's arrival, wrote:

"[...] she was practically the first outsider of either sex when she settled in this pocket of the hills in 1890, as well as the first inhabitant with a talent for organizing, and further, that she was a woman of exceptional charm and originality no matter in what society she might be placed."

Three individual mountains (North Sleeper, South Sleeper and Mount Katherine), a mountain range (The Sleepers), and numerous area trails are named after her and her community contributions have led to multiple novels, articles, and biographical pieces on her life and the influence she had in shaping the history of the White Mountains. Wonalancet Union Chapel's steeple and bell, which were built as part of Katherine's revitalization campaign, are dedicated to her.
