= Arthur Treadwell Walden =

American explorer and dog trainer (1871–1947)

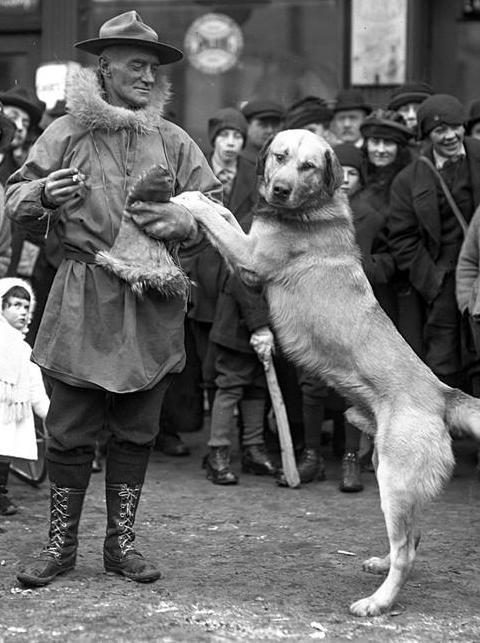
- Walden with his lead dog, Chinook, 1922
- Born: May 10, 1871; Indianapolis, Indiana, United States
- Died: March 26, 1947 (aged 75); Wonalancet, New Hampshire, United States
- Occupations: Prospector; freighter; dog trainer and breeder; author
- Spouse: Katherine Sleeper Walden (m. 1902)

Arthur Treadwell Walden (May 10, 1871 – March 26, 1947) was an American Klondike Gold Rush adventurer, author, dog driver and participant in the first Byrd Antarctic Expedition. He is also known as the creator of the Chinook dog breed, which would eventually be named as the official state dog of New Hampshire.

== Early life ==
Arthur Treadwell Walden was born on May 10, 1871, in Indianapolis, Indiana, to Episcopal clergyman the Rev. Treadwell Walden and his wife, Elizabeth Leighton. Walden spent much of his youth in Minnesota and was educated at the Chattuck Military School in Faribault. In 1890 his father was appointed minister of St. Paul's Cathedral in Boston. Disliking city life in Boston, Arthur went to live at his father's vacation home in Tamworth, New Hampshire.

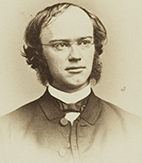
Arthur's father, the Rev. Treadwell Walden

== In Alaska and the Yukon ==
Restless and wanting adventure, Walden traveled to Alaska in March 1896. In August 1896 gold was discovered in the Klondike. During the gold rush, Walden found himself working as a freighter carrying supplies and mail down the Yukon River. He became experienced with sled dogs that were used to pull freight over vast distances. The use of sled dogs led to freighters being called "dog punchers".

In 1928, Walden published a memoir of this period, A Dog-Puncher on the Yukon.

== Breeding the Chinook ==
After returning to New England, Walden married Katherine Sleeper on December 9, 1902, in Tamworth, New Hampshire. She was a relative of his stepmother and the daughter of a wealthy Boston newspaper family. The couple operated the 1300-acre Wonalancet Farm and Inn. Walden began training and breeding sled dogs at the farm. On January 17, 1917, a litter of three dogs was born that Walden had bred from a female Greenland Dog and a male Mastiff/St. Bernard mix farm dog. One of those dogs, Chinook, was the progenitor of the breed that bears his name. He named the dog after a favorite Eskimo dog he worked with in the Yukon. The breed would eventually be named the state dog of New Hampshire. In 1922, he convinced a local newspaper to sponsor the first 123-mile Eastern International Dog Derby, promoting the nascent sport of dog sled racing in New England. Walden founded the New England Sled Dog Club in 1924.

== Antarctic Expedition ==
In 1927, Richard Byrd selected Walden to run the dog teams during his first Antarctic Expedition (1928–1930). Walden would only agree to accompany Byrd if he guaranteed that no dogs would be shot to save supplies, as had been done in previous expeditions to the Arctic. A few members of the expedition spent the winter of 1927–1928 at the Walden farm training and testing trail gear. During the expedition, Walden and his 13 dogs moved thousands of pounds of supplies from the ship over the 16 mile trail to base camp. Chinook, the progenitor and namesake of the breed, mysteriously disappeared on January 17, 1929, while moving supplies to base camp, and was presumed to have died.

In 1930 Walden, along with 80 others, received a Congressional medal titled the Byrd Antarctic Expedition Medal, for their parts in the expedition.

== Death ==
Walden died on March 26, 1947, while saving his wife from a fire in the kitchen of their farmhouse.
