= The Evil Empire: 101 Ways That England Ruined the World =

Book by Steven A. Grasse

- Author: Steven Grasse
- Language: English
- Subject: The United Kingdom
- Publisher: Quirk Books
- Publication date: April 2007
- Publication place: United States
- Media type: Hardcover
- Pages: 192
- ISBN: 1-59474-173-5
- OCLC: 86168689

The Evil Empire: 101 Ways That England Ruined the World is a book written by Steven Grasse, the chief executive officer of Philadelphia marketing agency Quaker City Mercantile. It was first published in April 2007 by Quirk Books. In the work the author argues that many of the world's problems were caused by the British Empire and also criticises British culture.

== Reception ==
Jonah Bloom of Advertising Age said that he believed "very few would take this book too seriously". Michael Henderson, writing for the Daily Telegraph, agreed that the British had on occasion made matters worse in Ireland and Africa, but considered that the United Kingdom had given much to the Enlightenment, the Industrial Revolution, and the age of Romanticism. Overall, he opined that the book was silly, and that it should be treated with laughter.

The New Statesman and Publishers Weekly both reviewed the work, with the latter stating that it was a "neat premise" but that "The more outrageous, hypocritical, and simply incorrect his allegations become, the better the reader should understand how it feels to be bombarded with ill-informed criticism on behalf of one's nation. But to pull it off requires a light touch to soften the abuse. Instead, Grasse tramples humourlessly through the material, lacing it with his own moral and political dogma."
