= Tamworth Distilling =

Distillery in New Hampshire

Coordinates: 43°51′33″N 71°15′59″W

- Industry: Distillery
- Founded: 2015
- Headquarters: Tamworth, New Hampshire
- Products: Small batch whiskey and spirits
- Website: tamworthdistilling.com

Tamworth Distilling is a small-batch distillery in Tamworth, New Hampshire, known for producing small-batch spirits with local ingredients.

== History ==
Tamworth Distilling was founded in 2015 by Steven Grasse, a student of transcendentalism who grew up summering in New Hampshire. Grasse, who had previously developed brands like Hendrick's Gin and Sailor Jerry Rum, came up with the concept for the distillery after discussing with whiskey enthusiast Jamie Oakes and Matt Powers. Tamworth Distilling was intended to revitalize the town of Tamworth, which Grasse described as the most idyllic place possible, by employing local farmers and attracting young people.

The distillery was built on the grounds of the former Tamworth Inn, with Tamworth Garden (formerly a venue for theater, music, and boxing matches) serving as the barrelhouse. The distillery's products include vodka, rye whiskey, eau de vie, gin, applejack, liqueurs and infused vodkas. It operates under a wilderness-to-bottle model and is known for using foraged ingredients in its spirits.

Since its founding, the distillery has produced themed spirits such as Eau de Musc, a whiskey flavoured with castoreum. In 2015, the distillery produced Skiklubben Aquavit as part of a fundraiser to restore the Nansen Ski Jump. An updated recipe of the aquavit was made available in 2018. In October 2019, the distillery released Graverobber Unholy Whiskey, which was produced using maple syrup from cemetery maple trees.

Beginning in 2017, a selection of products from Tamworth Distilling became available in Philadelphia via the retail shop and bar Art in the Age. In March 2020 during the COVID-19 pandemic, the distillery began producing hand sanitizer which was donated to the Tamworth Community Nurse Association.

In November 2020, the distillery released The Deer Slayer, a whiskey infused with venison. The distillery released Corpse Flower, flavored with durian and indole, in December 2020. In October 2021, the distillery released Bird of Courage, a whiskey flavored to imitate a traditional Thanksgiving dinner. A review in the Robb Report described its palate as "alternating between young wood, fresh sage and parsley, butter-roasted root vegetables".

In June 2022, the distillery released Crab Trapper, a bourbon distilled with the invasive green crab. Distillers at Tamworth developed the whiskey after learning about the ecological damage caused by invasive green crabs in the Northeast coast. The whiskey is made from a spiced and distilled crab stock, which is combined with a sour mash base. The mixture of spices include seasonings traditionally used in a seafood boil, such as paprika, coriander, cinnamon, cloves and allspice, and has been compared to "a briny Fireball". Crab Trapper went viral, and was featured on Food & Wine, Delish, USA Today, Smithsonian, NPR, and The Late Show with Stephen Colbert.

On March 14, 2023, Grasse was recognized as one of the "Drinks Innovators of the Year" by Food & Wine for his work with Tamworth Distilling. On May 9, 2023, Grasse is publishing the cocktail and wilderness guide Backcountry Cocktails with journalist Adam Erace and publisher Running Press.
