= HydroCAD =

HydroCAD is a computer-aided design (CAD) program used by civil engineers for modeling the hydrology and hydraulics (H&H) of stormwater runoff. Its use as a tool has grown in the U.S. as rules for managing stormwater have become more stringent. Specifically, the National Pollutant Discharge Elimination System (NPDES), last updated in December 2016, regulates point source pollution by municipal governments, industrial facilities and agricultural facilities. The NPDES was introduced in 1972 as part of the Clean Water Act, and is administered by the U.S. Environmental Protection Agency (EPA) in partnership with state environmental agencies.

H&H software such as HydroCAD is important in the implementation of the Low-Impact Development approach to stormwater management that is gaining popularity throughout the U.S. and Canada.

== History ==
The company was founded in 1977 as Applied Microcomputer Systems (AMS), initially developing custom software for technical and scientific applications. In the early years of personal computers, AMS produced various other programming tools for technical professionals.

In 1985, AMS began development of the HydroCAD Stormwater Modeling System as a response to growing hydrology requirements facing civil engineers. The program, ultimately introduced in 1986 for HP workstations, made it possible to conduct complex calculations on desktop computers rather than only on mainframes. It also added new graphical interfaces to improve ease of use.

In 2001, the HydroCAD software was re-written as a native Windows application, using Borland's Delphi programming environment, and released as HydroCAD 6.0.

In 2004, the company officially changed its name to “HydroCAD Software Solutions LLC”. Its headquarters office is on Chocorua Mountain Highway (also known as Route 16) in the town of Tamworth, New Hampshire.

The latest HydroCAD version 10.2 was released in May 2026. Future updates are expected approximately twice a year, allowing HydroCAD to stay current with the ever-expanding market of stormwater storage products (chambers) and flow control devices.
