= Shanghai Kate Hellenbrand =

American tattoo artist

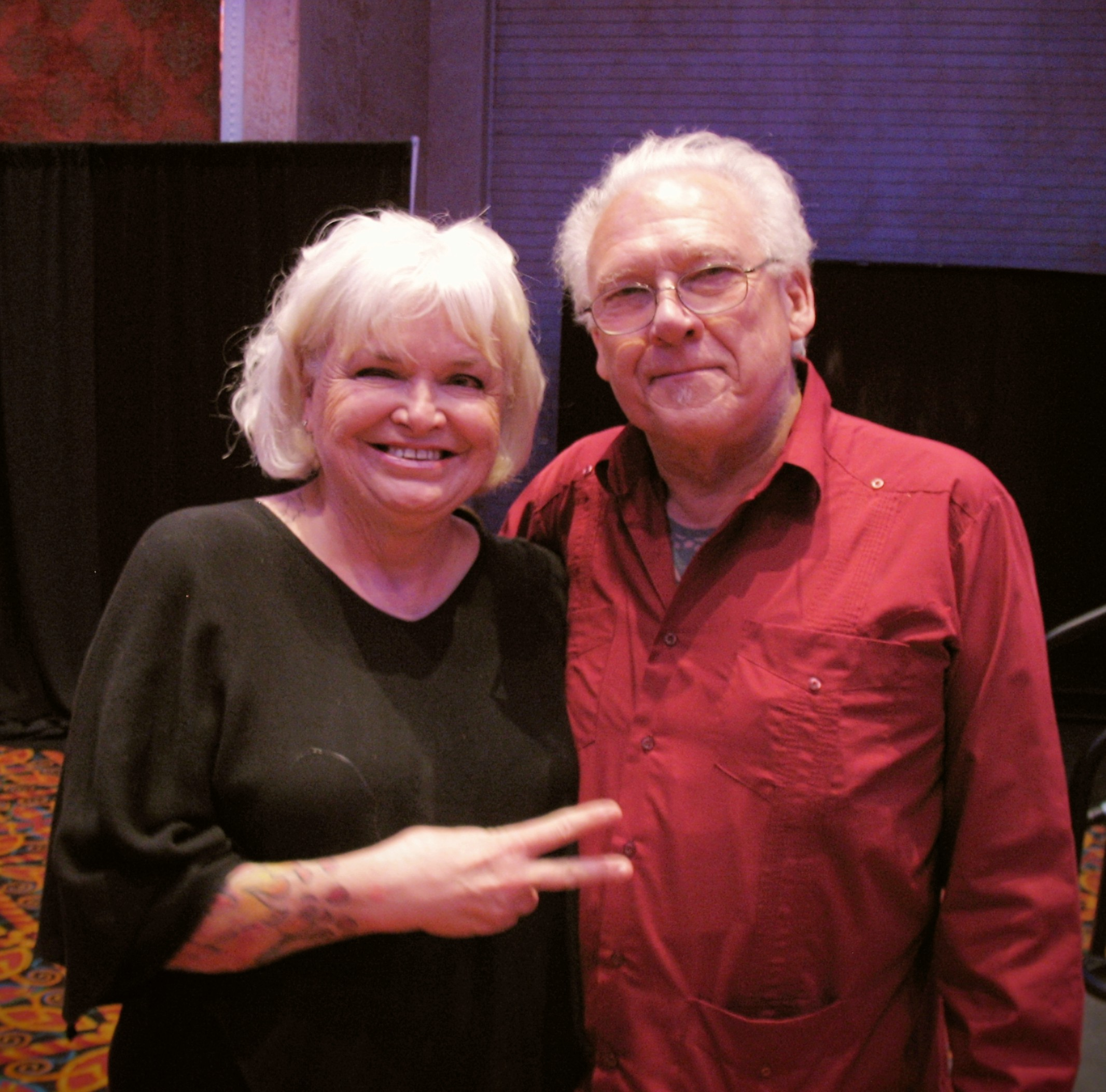
- Hellenbrand (left) with Lyle Tuttle in Reno, Nevada, 2008.
- Born: Kate Hellenbrand; October 29, 1943; Salt Lake City, Utah, U.S.
- Died: November 15, 2022 (aged 79); Austin, Texas, U.S.
- Other names: Shanghai Kate
- Occupation: Tattoo artist

"Shanghai" Kate Hellenbrand (October 29, 1943 – November 15, 2022) was an American tattoo artist. She worked in the industry for over 40 years and earned the title "America's Tattoo Godmother".

== Early life ==
Hellenbrand was born and raised in Salt Lake City, Utah. She started drawing at the age of 4. As a child, she enjoyed going with her grandmother to the circus and carnivals where she first saw people who had tattoos. Later, she went to art school at both ArtCenter College of Design and the Chouinard Art Institute.

== Career ==
With a background in art, Hellenbrand gained a work in advertising in the 1960s at the agency Muller Jordan & Herrick in New York City. At a time when tattooing was still illegal in New York, she and Michael "Mike" Malone (also known as Rollo Banks) both contributed to organising the American Folk Art Museum's 1971 exhibition "Tattoo!". After the exhibition, Rollo Banks began his own tattoo work at their studio apartment and later opened Catfish Tattoo where she originally helped him as a "hostess".

She was not originally aware of any American women tattoo artists, only having heard of Australian-based Bev Robinson (also known as Cindy Ray) and England-based Rusty Skuse. Although she felt that the tattoo industry was not welcoming of women tattoo artists at that time, she agreed to do her first tattoo for Tommy King when asked to do so by this regular client at Catfish Tattoo, drawing on her traditional background in art theory combined with her interest in this art form of tattooing and in the tools used by tattoo artists.

She later went to work with Sailor Jerry who she considered to be a mentor, and she has collaborated with many other famous tattoo artists, including Franklin Paul Rogers, Huck Spaulding, Don Ed Hardy, Zeke Owen, and Jack Rudy. Rudy gave her the nickname Shanghai Kate because she always worked at Chinatowns.

Hellenbrand ran Shanghai Kate's Tattoo Parlor in Austin, Texas.

Hellenbrand was considered to be "America's Tattoo Godmother" since, starting in 1971, she had shaped the tattoo industry and had the longest career of any other female tattoo artist in the USA. She was passionate about preserving tattoo history as shown by how she frequently visited tattoo conventions, mentored younger tattoo artists (especially women), and gave talks about the evolution of tattooing.

== Death and legacy ==
She died at the age of 79 on November 15, 2022. In 2019, Inked included her on its list of the "10 Female Artists Who've Changed the Tattoo Industry."
