= Colonial Spirits: A Toast to Our Drunken History =

2016 book by Steven Grasse

Colonial Spirits: A Toast To Our Drunken History
- Author: Steven Grasse
- Language: English
- Publisher: Abrams Books
- Publication date: September 2016
- Publication place: United States
- Media type: Hardcover
- Pages: 224
- ISBN: 1419722301
- OCLC: 958574007
- Website: colonialspiritsbook.com

Colonial Spirits: A Toast To Our Drunken History is a book written by Steven Grasse. It was first published in September 2016 by Abrams Books.

== Synopsis ==
The book is a survey of the drinking habits of the 18th century United States, with chapters on beer, cider, rum, punch and other beverages popular in Colonial America. It includes both historical and modern cocktail recipes, some from historical figures such as Martha Washington, interwoven with historical anecdotes from colonial history. The book's illustrations, drawn by Reverend Michael Alan, were inspired by Pennsylvania Dutch folk art.

== Reception ==
Colonial Spirits received generally positive reviews. Elise de los Santos of the Chicago Tribune described it as: "Part history lesson, part drink recipe book, Colonial Spirits imparts fun facts and anecdotes about our forefathers’ drinking habits with a 21st-century sense of humor."

Kristen Hartke of NPR wrote: "With witty illustrations by Reverend Michael Alan — think Pennsylvania Dutch folk art crossed with Edward Gorey — Colonial Spirits thumbs its nose, ever so slightly, at the American obsession with mixology and fussily precise 12-ingredient cocktails."

The book was featured in publications such as The Wall Street Journal, Smithsonian, Imbibe, and CBS 5 San Francisco. Colonial Spirits was nominated for "Best New Spirits Book" at the 2017 Tales of the Cocktail Spirited Awards.
