= Chocorua River =

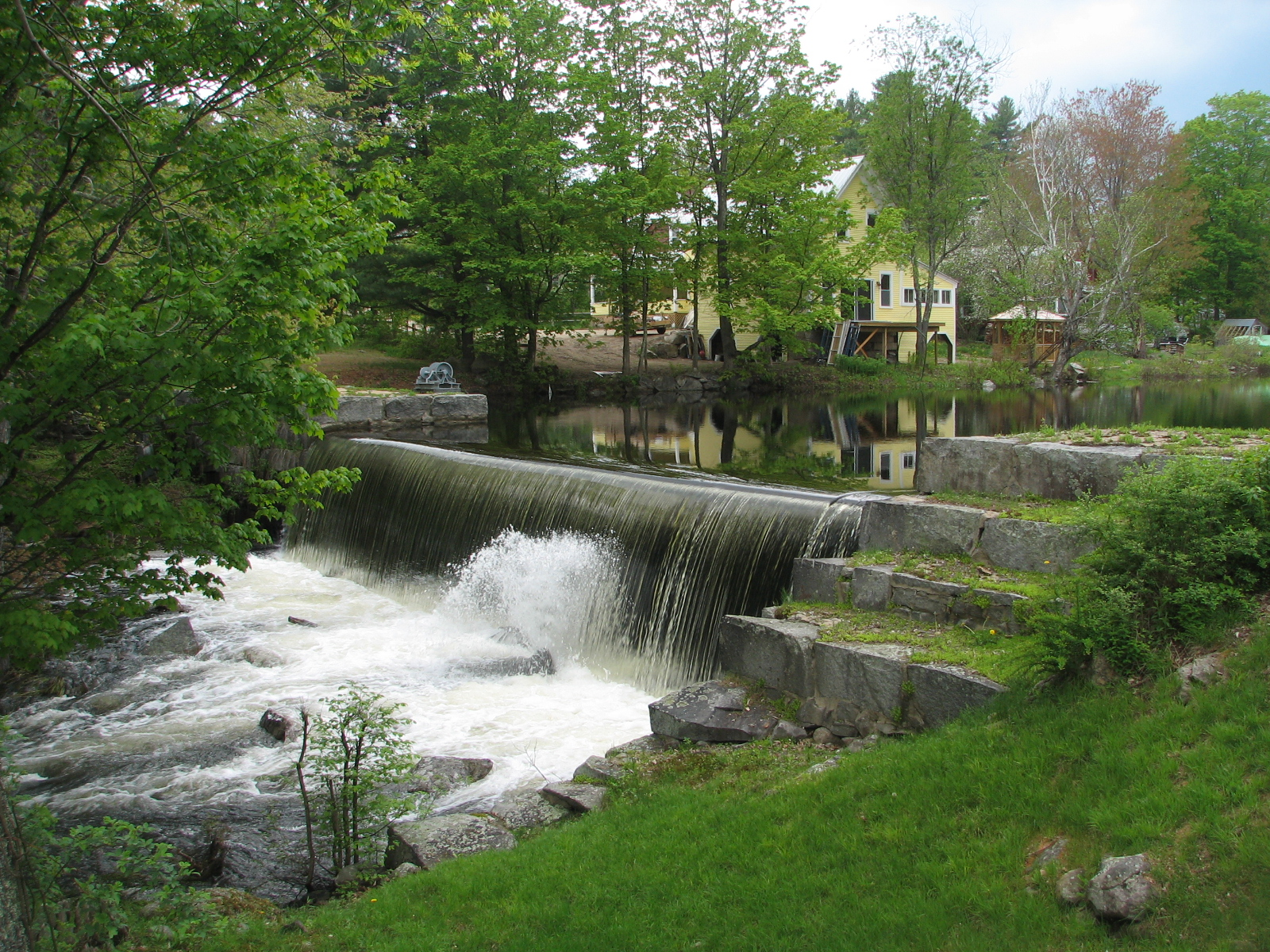
- A small dam on the Chocorua River in the village of Chocorua

- Location within New Hampshire Location within the United States

Location
- Country: United States
- State: New Hampshire
- County: Carroll
- Towns: Albany, Tamworth, Ossipee

Physical characteristics
- Source: Mount Chocorua
  - location: Albany
  - coordinates: 43°57′42″N 71°16′1″W
  - elevation: 2,820 ft (860 m)
- Mouth: Bearcamp River
  - location: West Ossipee
  - coordinates: 43°48′55″N 71°11′56″W
  - elevation: 410 ft (120 m)
- Length: 15.2 mi (24.5 km)

Basin features
- Tributaries
  - left: Deer Brook
  - right: Stony Brook

The Chocorua River is a 15.2-mile (24.5 km) river located in eastern New Hampshire in the United States. It is a tributary of the Bearcamp River, part of the Ossipee Lake / Saco River watershed leading to the Atlantic Ocean.

The Chocorua River rises on the eastern slopes of Mount Chocorua, a prominent rocky knob at the southeast margin of the White Mountains. The river flows south into lowlands at the base of the mountain and arrives at Chocorua Lake, noted for its outstanding view of Mount Chocorua. Beyond the lake, the river flows south to the village of Chocorua with a picturesque mill dam, then continues into the flat, sandy Ossipee Lake region, reaching the Bearcamp River at West Ossipee.

New Hampshire Route 16 parallels the Chocorua River for most of its length.

== Local history ==
In the early 20th century, innkeepers purchased the granite mill dam at the southern end of Moore's Pond on the river in Chocorua village. In 1912, the owners of the Chocorua Inn converted the mill dam into a hydroelectric operation hoping to supply energy to part of the town. A year or so later, the dam was demolished in a flood, never to be reconstructed. As the eastern portion of the dam was breached, the levee broke and released two thirds of the pond in a few hours, causing the water level to drop 15 feet (4.6 m) and allowing former marshlands to thrive again.

== See also ==
- List of rivers of New Hampshire
