= Chinook (dog breed) =

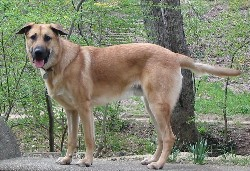
- A male Chinook
- Origin: United States
Kennel club standards
- United Kennel Club: standard
- Notes: State dog of New Hampshire

The Chinook is a breed of sled dog, developed in the state of New Hampshire during the early 20th century. The Chinook is New Hampshire's official state dog.

== Description ==
=== Appearance ===
Standing 21 to 27 inches (53 to 69 cm) in height at the withers and weighing 45 to 90 pounds (20 to 41 kg), the Chinook is balanced and muscular. The United Kennel Club (UKC) breed standard states, "The ideal coloration runs from light honey color to reddish-gold. Black markings on the inside corners of the eyes are preferred. Dark tawny to black markings on the ears and muzzle are preferred. Guard hairs on the tail may be black. No white markings are allowed. Buff markings on the cheeks, muzzle, throat, chest, breeches, toes and underside are acceptable." The UKC standard faults any color other than tawny and disqualifies albinism. Other proposed standards state that the medium-length double coat is "tawny" in color, with darker shadings on muzzle and ears; white dogs are not allowed, nor are other colors. Eyes are brown to amber in color. Ear carriage is variable, but dropped is preferred and the head more strongly rectangular than other sleddog breeds. The tail is a well-furred saber and not the usual brush or plume of Arctic breeds.

=== Temperament ===
The Chinook is an affectionate and playful family companion with a special devotion toward children. It is a willing worker who is eager to please and enthusiastic to learn. The Chinook is highly trainable, adaptable, and versatile in his abilities. Gregarious with other dogs, the Chinook works well in teams and within family packs. The Chinook is a dignified dog; some may be reserved with strangers but should never appear shy or aggressive.

== Health ==
Health issues include normal hereditary problems such as epilepsy, hip dysplasia, and atopy. Also common is cryptorchidism, which occurs in about 10% of all male dogs.

== History ==
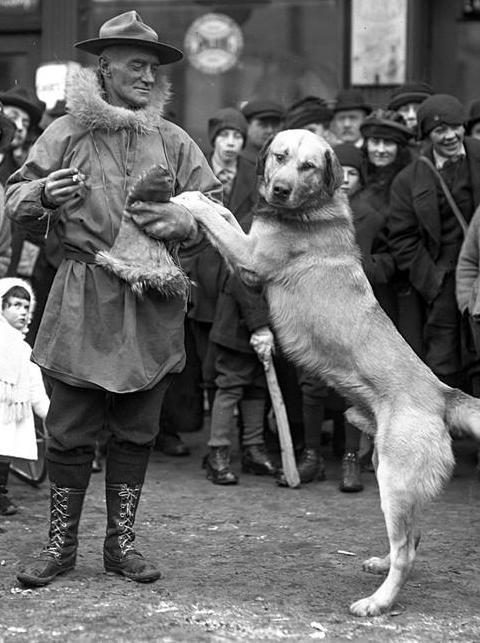
Arthur T. Walden and Chinook, 1922

The Chinook owes its existence to one man: Arthur Treadwell Walden of Wonalancet, New Hampshire. The breed derives principally from one male ancestor born in 1917, named "Chinook", who was Walden's lead dog and stud. Walden began his efforts to create what he believed could be the ideal sled dog after an expedition to the Yukon where he worked alongside a Eskimo guide and his dog named Chinook. Walden, in his effort to create his own Chinook, bred a Greenland Dog directly descended from the lead of the Peary North Pole expedition named Ningo with a large, tawny male Mastiff/St. Bernard mix named Kim. The pair had three pups. Walden's wife, Katherine Sleeper Walden, named them Rikki, Tikki, and Tavi in reference to The Jungle Book. As Rikki grew, he showed the traits which Walden had searched for and was renamed Chinook after his native american companion's dog. "Chinook" derived from crossbreeding of a female. Photos of "Chinook" show a drop-eared dog with a broad Mastiff head and muzzle. Walden's leader was bred to Belgian Sheepdogs, German Shepherd Dogs, Canadian Eskimo Dogs, and perhaps other breeds; the progeny were bred back to him to set the desired type and he was apparently a strong reproducer of his own traits. Arthur Walden was an experienced dog driver with years of experience in the Yukon; he was lead driver and trainer on Byrd's 1929 Antarctic expedition. He is credited with bringing sled dog sports to New England and founding the New England Sled Dog Club in 1924. The 12-year-old "Chinook" went missing on the Byrd expedition while hauling supplies miles overland from ship to shore, and was presumed to have died.

Control of the core breeding stock passed from Walden to Julia Lombard and from her to Perry Greene in the late 1940s. Greene, a noted outdoorsman, bred Chinooks in Waldoboro, Maine, for many years until his death in 1963. Rare and closely held by Greene, who was for many years the only breeder of Chinooks, the population dwindled rapidly after his death. By 1981 only eleven breedable Chinooks survived. Breeders in Maine, Ohio and California divided the remaining stock and managed to save the type from extinction.

The Chinook obtained registered status with the UKC in 1991; the current number of registered animals is around 800. Only about 100 puppies are born annually worldwide. The registry has a cross-breeding program under which Chinooks are bred to individuals of other breeds thought to have contributed to Chinook development; fourth-generation backcross descendants of such crosses may be accepted as UKC purebred Chinooks if they meet the Chinook Owner Association's Cross Breeding Program requirements.

Chinooks joined the American Kennel Club (AKC) Foundation Stock Service in 2001 and were later added to the AKC's Miscellaneous Class in 2010. Finally, in January 2013 the Chinook became the AKC's 176th breed and joined the working group. Chinooks are still working for recognition from other major kennel clubs.

=== Working life ===
Although still used for recreational dog sledding by some owners, Chinooks today appear to be used largely as family pets. Individuals are also used for dog-packing, search and rescue, skijoring, and obedience and dog agility trials.

== See also ==
- List of dog breeds
