= Capt. Enoch Remick House =

Historic house in New Hampshire, United States

- U.S. National Register of Historic Places
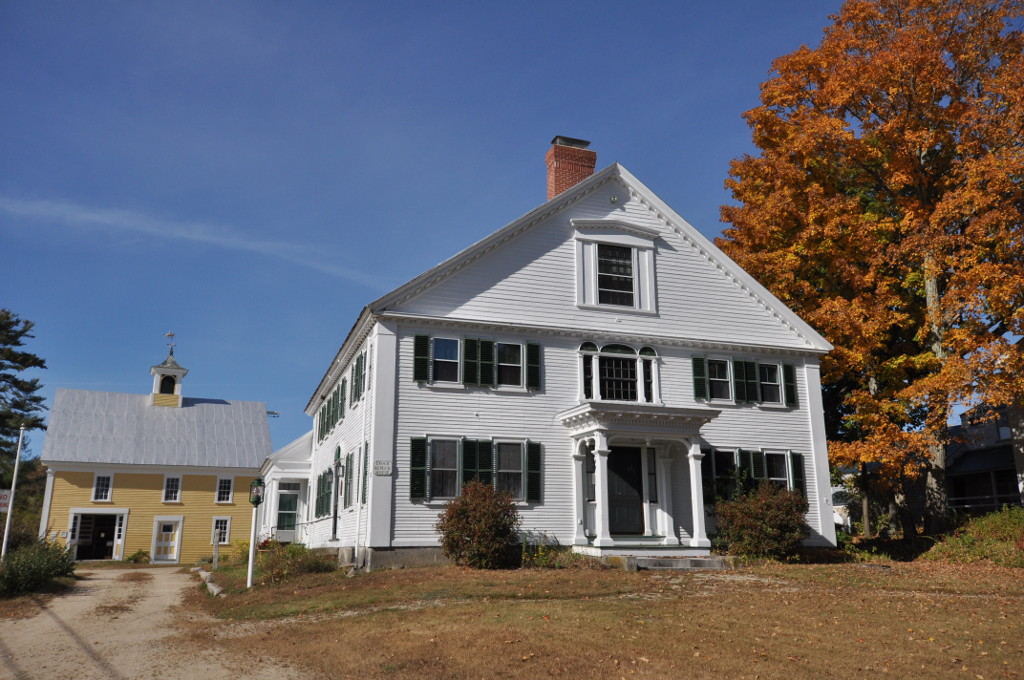

- Location within New Hampshire Location within the United States
- Location: 4 Great Hill Rd., Tamworth, New Hampshire
- Coordinates: 43°51′38″N 71°16′15″W
- Area: 69 acres (28 ha)
- Built: 1808
- Architectural style: Greek Revival, Federal
- NRHP reference No.: 96000616
- Added to NRHP: June 3, 1996

The Captain Enoch Remick House is part of a historic homestead located in the town of Tamworth, New Hampshire, United States. In 1996, the house—along with a complex of five surrounding outbuildings and approximately 69 acres (28 ha) of field, pasture and woodland—was listed on the National Register of Historic Places for its significance in art, architecture, and local agriculture. It now operates under the auspices of the Remick Country Doctor Museum & Farm.

== History of ownership ==
The early history of the home is approximate, as records are sparse. In 1779, a shipwright and resident of Newmarket, New Hampshire, named Enoch Remick (1730-1800) purchased 200 acres (81 ha) of land in Tamworth from David Chapman, also of Newmarket. Enoch's fourth son, John Remick (1763-1849), a shipwright and joiner, purchased 50 acres (20 ha) of this plot from his father in 1794 and another 50 acres from his sisters in 1805. Neither transaction mentions any existing buildings on the property at the time it was purchased. It is plausible—and generally theorized—that John, a skilled carpenter, was responsible for building the original portion of the home circa 1808.

John Remick sold his homestead to Samuel Edgel in 1812, who in turn sold it to William Edgel in 1816. Sometime in the 1820s, the property was transferred to Captain Enoch Remick (1798-1897) (John Remick's son and the house's namesake) and his wife Lucinda Edgel Remick (1795-1879) (William Edgel's daughter or sister). Captain Enoch Remick was a prominent local citizen who served as state representative (1830–31) and selectman (1832). From roughly the 1830s to 1850s, the third floor of the home served as the site of town meetings, before Tamworth had a designated town hall. Captain Enoch also ran an inn out of the house for about three decades, and the house served as a stopover point for horses traveling on the Center Harbor-Conway stagecoach route.

In 1867 Enoch Remick sold his homestead to Nathaniel Hubbard, Jr. (1820-1892). Hubbard would go on to marry Captain Enoch's daughter, Sarah Edgell Remick (1820-1904), the following year. Nathaniel and Sarah lived in the home for more than two decades, and by 1880 their 430-acre (170 ha) farm was the third largest and most valuable in town. After Nathaniel's death in 1892, Sarah remained in the family home until her death twelve years later. Having no children, Sarah left her property to be divided among her three nephews. One of these, Dr. Edwin Remick (1866-1935), bought out his brothers' shares, taking full title to the house and its accompanying land in 1904.

Dr. Remick moved into the home with his wife, Emily Alice Crafts (1861-1911), and infant son, Edwin Crafts Remick (1903-1993). The family lived on the second floor of the home while Dr. Remick, the country doctor for the community in and around Tamworth, ran a medical practice out of the home's first floor. In 1929, his son Edwin Crafts Remick—by now a doctor himself—joined the practice. Edwin Remick Sr. lived in the home until his death in 1935. His son, Edwin Crafts Remick, lived in a nearby farmhouse and continued to operate the medical practice and farm—including Hillsdale Dairy, the first pasteurization facility north of Rochester—until he died in 1993. Edwin Crafts and his wife Marion Ella Miles (1906-1980) had no children. Before his death, Dr. E.C. Remick established the Edwin C. Remick Foundation to continue operating his farm and preserve the historic homestead as a museum.

== Architectural and artistic significance ==
The Captain Enoch Remick House reflects three major building campaigns. It was built circa 1808 in the Federal style and enlarged/renovated circa 1830 and again circa 1850. Architectural details reflect the three periods of major construction and include Federal and Greek Revival doors (many of which are grain-painted); Federal and Greek Revival window and door casings; Federal, Greek Revival, and Italianate (marble) fireplace surrounds; a Federal staircase at the front of the house; and a turned staircase likely dating from the 1870s or 1880s at the west entrance. Tin ceilings, which were probably installed in the late nineteenth century, are found in several of the rooms. Above the home's south entrance is a Palladian window (probably dating to 1808) of somewhat unusual appearance in that each of the sections is topped by a louvered arch. As it now stands, the house is a south-facing, 2½-story, woodframe, "L"-plan building with an offset 1½-story rear addition.

One of the home's most significant interior features is the presence of several wall murals believed to have been painted by the New Hampshire itinerant artist John Avery (1790-1871). While these murals are unsigned, several of their visual elements ("lumpy" hills; trees grouped and placed over doorways; bunches of grapes; "wave-like" rows of shrubs; delicate curlicues) are characteristic of Avery's work. A stagecoach motif appears on a wall in the Remick doctors' pharmacy room and may have been painted as a reference to the home's historic use as a stagecoach stopover.

== Remick Country Doctor Museum & Farm ==
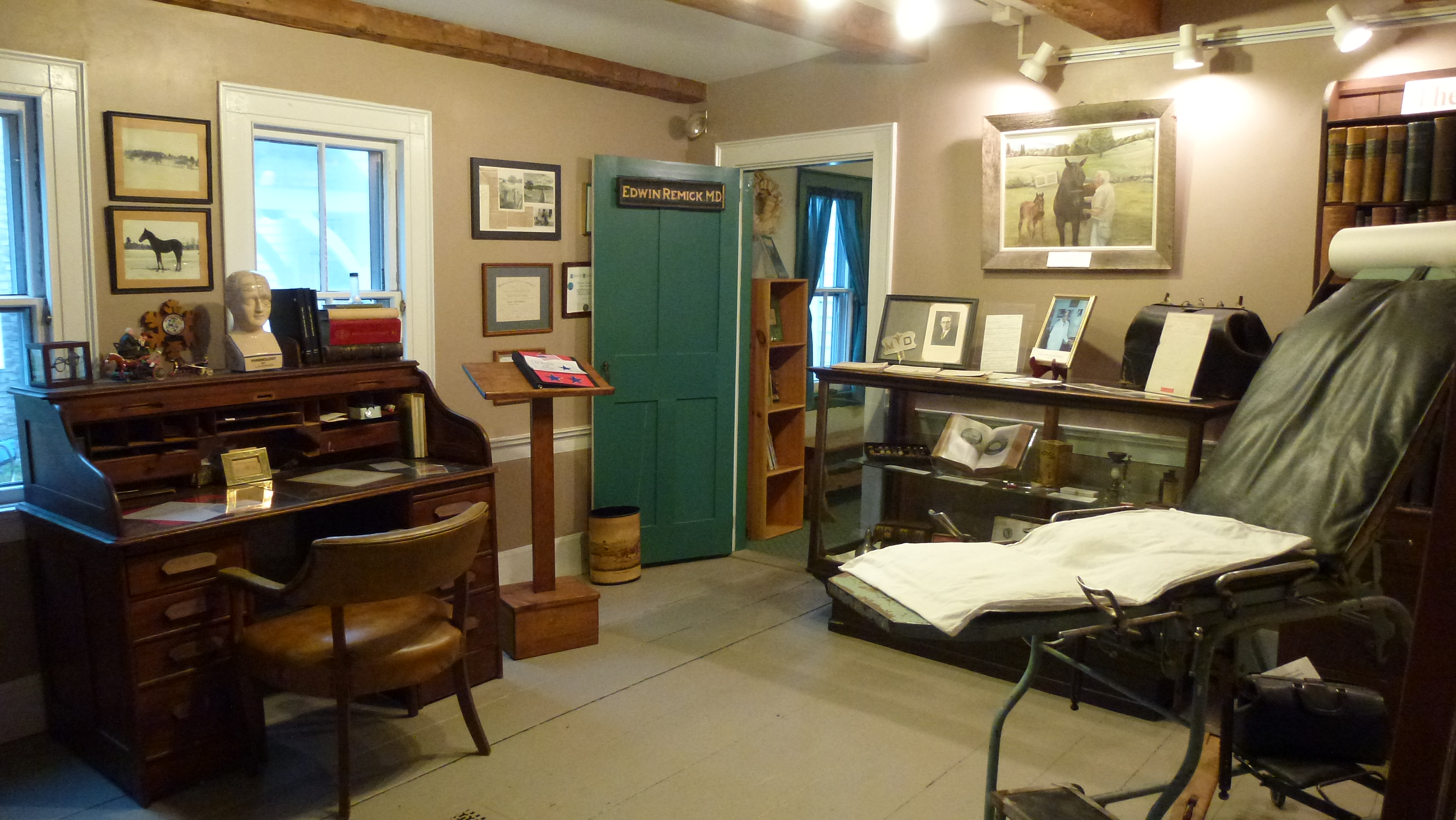
20th-century period country doctor's office

The Captain Enoch Remick House is now operated by the Remick Country Doctor Museum & Farm, a 501(c)(3) nonprofit institution operated by the Edwin C. Remick Foundation that interprets medical history, New England agricultural history, and the rural lifestyle of the country doctor via exhibits, demonstrations, and public programs. The museum complex includes a museum center (located inside a historic connected farmhouse that includes a historic English barn and was previously occupied by Edwin Crafts and Marion Remick and their farmhands); cattle barn; milk house; maple sugar house; ice house; and stable. In addition to a museum, the site operates as a working farm, with chickens, pigs, sheep, goats, beef and dairy cows on-site and assorted hay fields in and around Tamworth.

The interior of the Captain Enoch Remick House has been preserved largely in a late 19th century style and is available to museum visitors for tours. Highlights include the Remick doctors' pharmacy and medical office, a screened-in sleeping porch, and the elder Dr. Remick's second-floor living quarters.

== See also ==
- National Register of Historic Places listings in Carroll County, New Hampshire
