= Tamworth, New Hampshire =

- Town
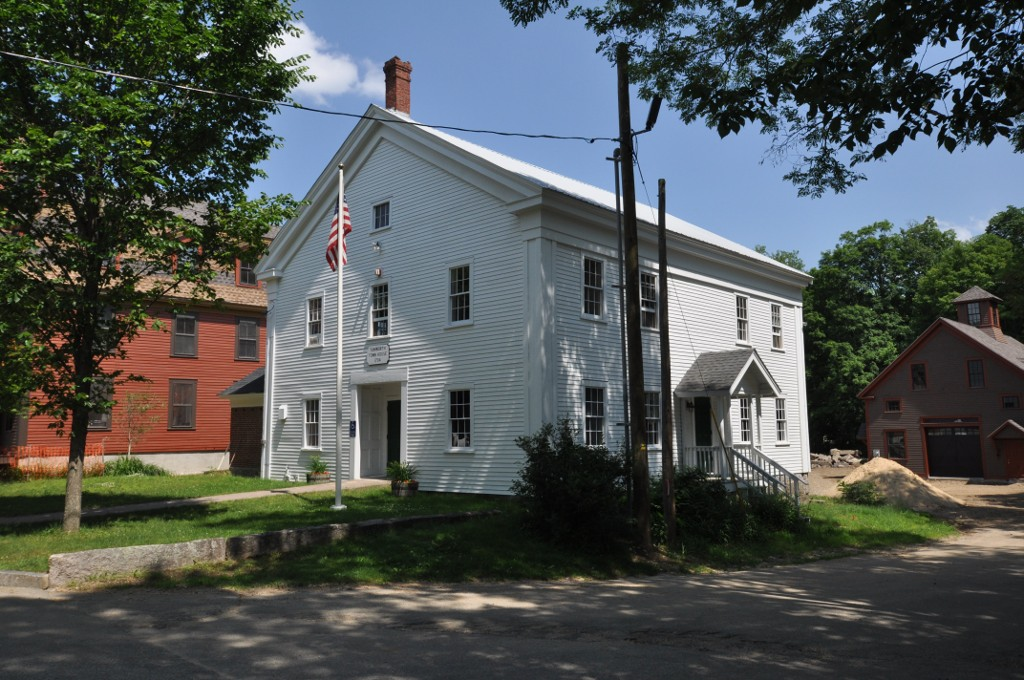
- The Tamworth Town House (1794)

- Seal

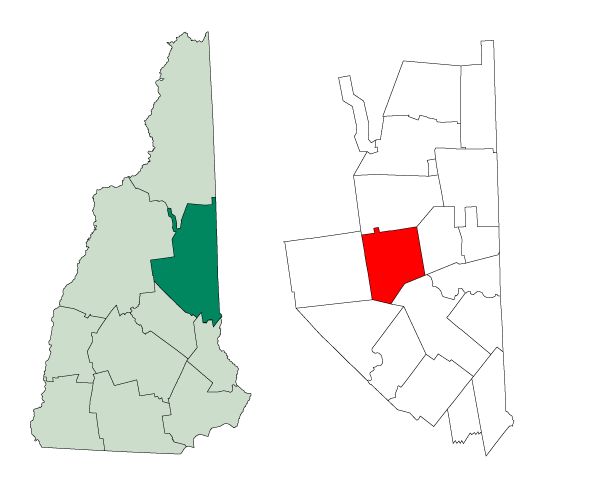
- Location in Carroll County, New Hampshire
- Coordinates: 43°51′35″N 71°15′47″W
- Country: United States
- State: New Hampshire
- County: Carroll
- Incorporated: 1766
- Villages: Tamworth; Chocorua; South Tamworth; Whittier; Wonalancet

Area
  - Total: 60.7 sq mi (157.1 km^{2})
  - Land: 59.5 sq mi (154.2 km^{2})
  - Water: 1.1 sq mi (2.8 km^{2}) 1.81%
- Elevation: 554 ft (169 m)

Population (2020)
  - Total: 2,812
  - Density: 47/sq mi (18.2/km^{2})
- Time zone: UTC-5 (Eastern)
  - Summer (DST): UTC-4 (Eastern)
- ZIP codes: 03886 (Tamworth); 03817 (Chocorua); 03875 (Silver Lake); 03883 (South Tamworth); 03897 (Wonalancet)
- Area code: 603
- FIPS code: 33-76100
- GNIS feature ID: 873736
- Website: www.tamworthnh.gov

Tamworth is a town in Carroll County, New Hampshire, United States. The population was 2,812 at the 2020 census, and an estimated 2,895 in 2025. Tamworth includes the villages of Chocorua, South Tamworth, Wonalancet, and Whittier. The White Mountain National Forest is to the north. The town is home to Hemenway State Forest in the north and White Lake State Park in the southeast.

== History ==
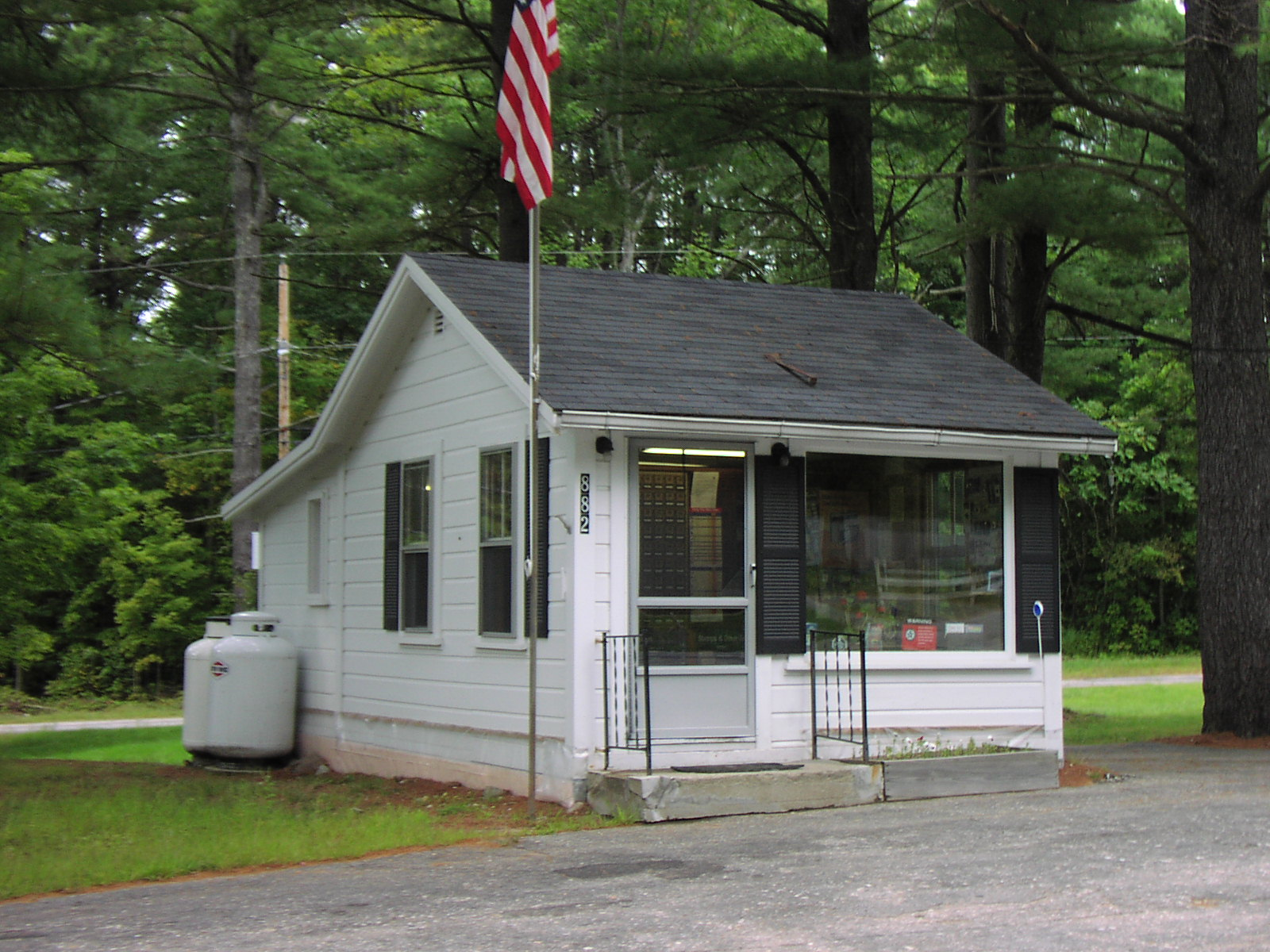
Post office in South Tamworth, NH

Granted in 1766 by colonial Governor Benning Wentworth, this town was named in honor of his close friend, British Vice-Admiral Washington Shirley, Viscount Tamworth. The admiral's daughter, Selina Shirley, was instrumental in the founding of Dartmouth College. The village of Whittier, like Mount Whittier in Ossipee, is named for the poet John Greenleaf Whittier.

Arthur Treadwell Walden's Chinook Kennels raised sled dogs for Rear Admiral Richard E. Byrd's Antarctic expeditions and the Army's search-and-rescue units. The Barnstormers Theatre group was established here in 1931 by Francis Cleveland, son of President Grover Cleveland. He supported the theater until his death in 1995. The group is hailed as the oldest continuously running professional summer theater in the country.

At the turn of the 20th century, many people traveled to the White Mountains of New Hampshire seeking haven from the noise of the cities and the business of urban life. Thinkers, artists and writers such as William and Henry James, E.E. Cummings, friends and descendants of Julia Ward Howe and many others vacationed in the Tamworth area. Inns and resorts, such as the Wonalancet Inn owned by Katherine Sleeper Walden, helped to encourage tourism and vacationing in the Tamworth area.

== Geography ==
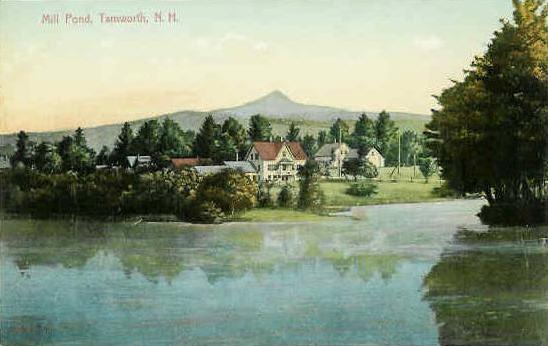
Mill Pond c. 1910, with Mount Chocorua in the distance

According to the United States Census Bureau, the town has a total area of 60.7 square miles (157.1 km^{2}), of which 59.5 square miles (154.2 km^{2}) are land and 1.1 square miles (2.8 km^{2}) are water, comprising 1.81% of the town. Tamworth is drained by the Bearcamp River and its tributaries the Chocorua, Wonalancet, and Swift rivers. Chocorua Lake is to the north. The entire town is part of the Saco River watershed. The highest point in Tamworth is the summit of Black Snout Mountain at 2,689 feet (820 m) above sea level, located precisely at the southwest corner of the town, within the Ossipee Mountain range.

=== Climate ===
Climate data for Tamworth 4, New Hampshire, 1991–2020 normals: 541ft (165m)
Month	Jan	Feb	Mar	Apr	May	Jun	Jul	Aug	Sep	Oct	Nov	Dec	Year
Mean daily maximum °F (°C)	29.1 (−1.6)	31.9 (−0.1)	40.3 (4.6)	53.3 (11.8)	65.6 (18.7)	73.5 (23.1)	78.3 (25.7)	76.9 (24.9)	69.6 (20.9)	56.6 (13.7)	44.7 (7.1)	34.2 (1.2)	54.5 (12.5)
Daily mean °F (°C)	18.4 (−7.6)	20.2 (−6.6)	28.7 (−1.8)	41.0 (5.0)	52.9 (11.6)	61.5 (16.4)	66.5 (19.2)	64.7 (18.2)	56.8 (13.8)	45.2 (7.3)	34.8 (1.6)	24.8 (−4.0)	43.0 (6.1)
Mean daily minimum °F (°C)	7.7 (−13.5)	8.4 (−13.1)	17.1 (−8.3)	28.7 (−1.8)	40.3 (4.6)	49.6 (9.8)	54.7 (12.6)	52.5 (11.4)	44.0 (6.7)	33.8 (1.0)	25.0 (−3.9)	15.3 (−9.3)	31.4 (−0.3)
Average precipitation inches (mm)	3.67 (93)	3.33 (85)	3.99 (101)	4.63 (118)	3.76 (96)	4.64 (118)	4.83 (123)	4.03 (102)	4.33 (110)	5.71 (145)	4.59 (117)	4.86 (123)	52.37 (1,331)
Average snowfall inches (cm)	18.40 (46.7)	22.40 (56.9)	14.00 (35.6)	4.20 (10.7)	0.00 (0.00)	0.00 (0.00)	0.00 (0.00)	0.00 (0.00)	0.00 (0.00)	0.60 (1.5)	5.10 (13.0)	18.30 (46.5)	83 (210.9)
Source: NOAA

== Demographics ==
Historical population
Census	Pop.	Note	%±
1790	266		—
1800	757		184.6%
1810	1,134		49.8%
1820	1,442		27.2%
1830	1,554		7.8%
1840	1,716		10.4%
1850	1,766		2.9%
1860	1,078		−39.0%
1870	1,344		24.7%
1880	1,274		−5.2%
1890	1,025		−19.5%
1900	1,050		2.4%
1910	993		−5.4%
1920	945		−4.8%
1930	955		1.1%
1940	1,056		10.6%
1950	1,025		−2.9%
1960	1,016		−0.9%
1970	1,054		3.7%
1980	1,672		58.6%
1990	2,165		29.5%
2000	2,510		15.9%
2010	2,856		13.8%
2020	2,812		−1.5%
2024 (est.)	2,902		3.2%
U.S. Decennial Census

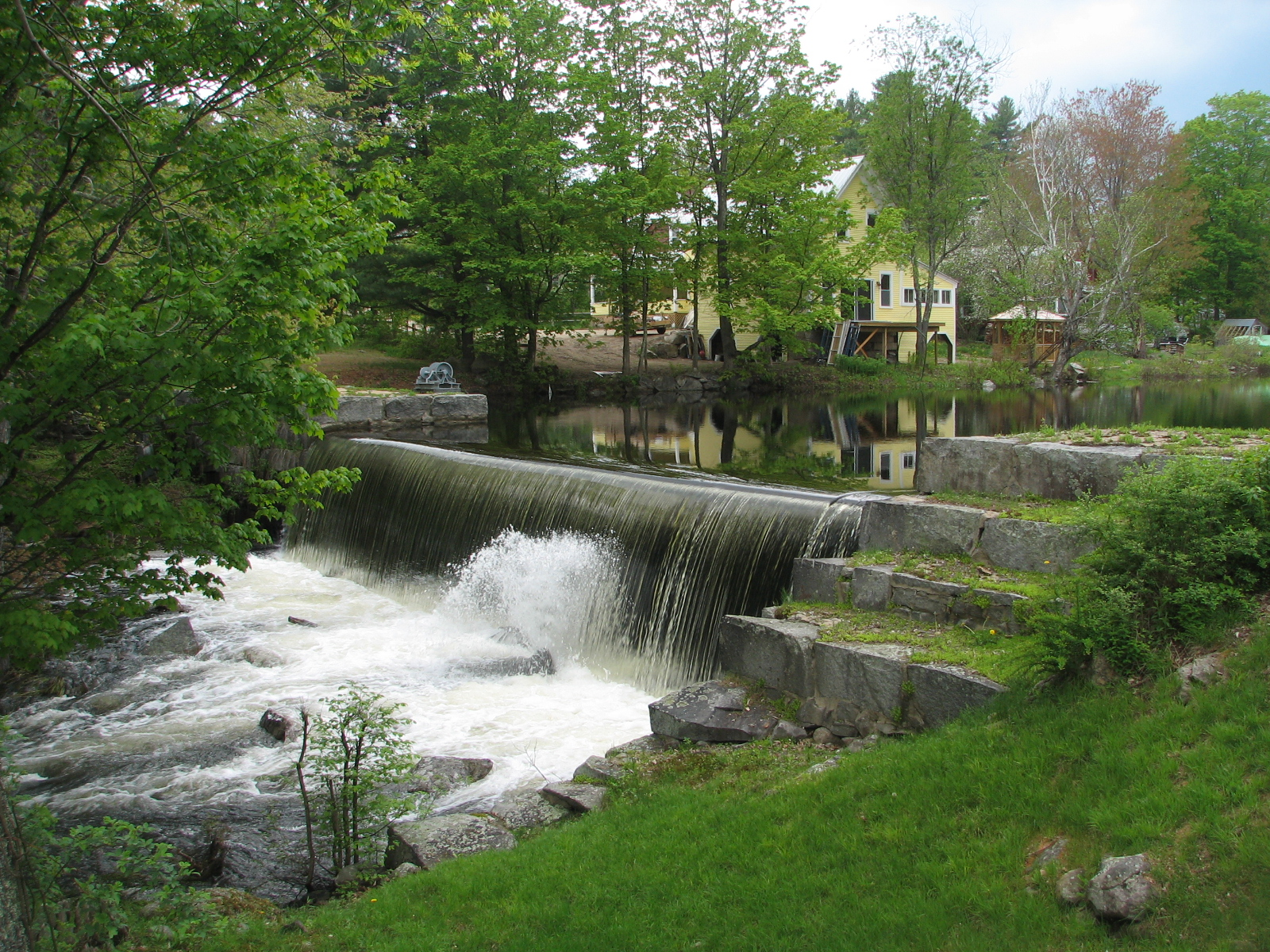
A small dam on the Chocorua River in the village of Chocorua

As of the census of 2000, there were 2,510 people, 1,074 households, and 675 families residing in the town. The population density was 41.9 inhabitants per square mile (16.2/km^{2}). There were 1,662 housing units at an average density of 27.7 per square mile (10.7/km^{2}). The racial makeup of the town was 98.05% White, 0.16% African American, 0.24% Native American, 0.20% Asian, 0.36% from other races, and 1.00% from two or more races. Hispanic or Latino of any race were 0.64% of the population.

There were 1,074 households, out of which 29.1% had children under the age of 18 living with them, 50.7% were married couples living together, 7.6% had a female householder with no husband present, and 37.1% were non-families. 28.7% of all households were made up of individuals, and 11.2% had someone living alone who was 65 years of age or older. The average household size was 2.33 and the average family size was 2.86.

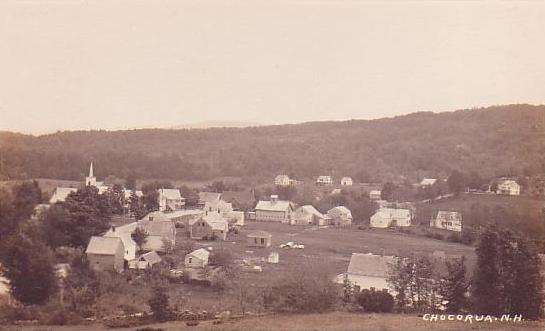
Chocorua Village c. 1912

In the town, the population was spread out, with 23.7% under the age of 18, 6.3% from 18 to 24, 28.4% from 25 to 44, 26.0% from 45 to 64, and 15.7% who were 65 years of age or older. The median age was 41 years. For every 100 females, there were 103.7 males. For every 100 females age 18 and over, there were 97.1 males.

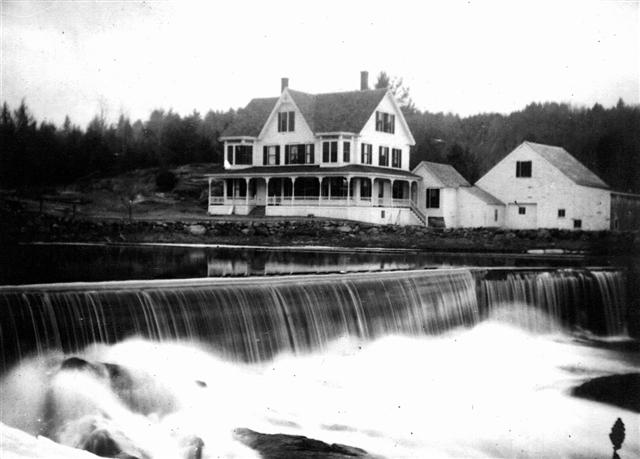
Former dam on Bearcamp River in the village of South Tamworth; Bartlett House in background c. 1906

The median income for a household in the town was $35,200, and the median income for a family was $41,121. Males had a median income of $30,389 versus $23,352 for females. The per capita income for the town was $17,961. About 7.1% of families and 9.5% of the population were below the poverty line, including 8.2% of those under age 18 and 10.1% of those age 65 or over.

== Transportation ==
The Carroll County Transit "Blue Loon" Public Route began operating in January 2012 and new, 16-passenger, wheelchair accessible buses are now rolling through the county.

The Carroll County Transit system includes an all-day flex-route connector service that originates in Wolfeboro (Bus Route # 2), runs north along Route 28 to West Ossipee and continues north along Route 16, traveling to Conway, and North Conway (Bus Route # 1). The service is provided using two buses running in opposite directions (Bus Routes # 1 & 2). Additionally, a fixed-route connector operates twice a day between West Ossipee and Laconia (Route #3). Transfer between the bus routes takes place in West Ossipee.

As of December 2012, the Concord Coach bus stop in West Ossipee is available. This route connects the region with destinations as far south as Boston and as far north as Berlin.

Five New Hampshire State Routes cross Tamworth:

- NH 16, the White Mountain Highway, is the main north–south through route in town, and has many businesses along the heavily traveled route. It follows the eastern border of the town, and connects Ossipee in the south to Albany in the north. It passes White Lake State Park, then meets NH 113 in the village of Chocorua near Chocorua Lake, before entering Albany.
- NH 25 enters from Sandwich in the west along Whittier Highway and joins NH 113 for a concurrency along Bearcamp Highway, closely following the Bearcamp River. In the village of Whittier, NH 113 leaves to the north, and NH 25 continues along the same road, entering Ossipee in the southeast corner of town.
- NH 41 briefly crosses the extreme southeastern corner of town, connecting Ossipee in the south to Madison in the east. It is known locally as Plains Road.
- NH 113 enters from Sandwich in the west in the village of South Tamworth, joins NH 25 in a concurrency along Bearcamp Highway, then leaves the highway in the village of Whittier and crosses the Bearcamp River on Tamworth Road. It meets the eastern terminus of NH 113A in the main village of Tamworth at the geographic center of town, where it turns east along Chocorua Road. It crosses NH 16 in the village of Chocorua, then crosses into Madison along Page Hill Road to the east.
- NH 113A enters from Sandwich and takes a circuitous route through the town's sparsely populated northwestern corner, including the village of Wonalancet. It mostly encircles Hemenway State Forest before meeting its eastern terminus at the main village of Tamworth. It is known as Chinook Trail for its entire route.

== Culture ==
Tamworth has a variety of year round cultural and recreational organizations. The Tamworth Outing Club (TOC), established in 1935, holds events such as a dance on the second Saturday of every month, a Fourth of July road race, and other holiday events.

The Barnstormers Theatre in the town center performs plays and musicals throughout the summer.

== In popular culture ==
The 1942 epic Look to the Mountain, by LeGrand Cannon Jr., takes place in Tamworth as 19-year-old Whit Livingston and his new wife, 16-year-old Melissa Butler, become the first white pioneer family to settle the area.

== Commerce ==
The village of Chocorua in Tamworth is home to the stormwater modeling software company HydroCAD, Inc.

== Notable people ==
- Grover Cleveland (1837–1908), 22nd and 24th President of the United States (summer resident)
- John Davidson, entertainer
- William James (1842–1910), psychologist, philosopher (died in the village of Chocorua, located within Tamworth)
- Florence Luscomb (1887–1985), architect
- Arthur Treadwell Walden (1871–1947), explorer, dog trainer
- Katherine Sleeper Walden (1862–1949), environmental activist

== Sites of interest ==
- The Barnstormers Theatre
- Cook Memorial Library
- Remick Country Doctor Museum & Farm
- Tamworth History Center
- Tamworth Distilling
