= Cook Memorial Library (Tamworth, New Hampshire) =

- U.S. National Register of Historic Places
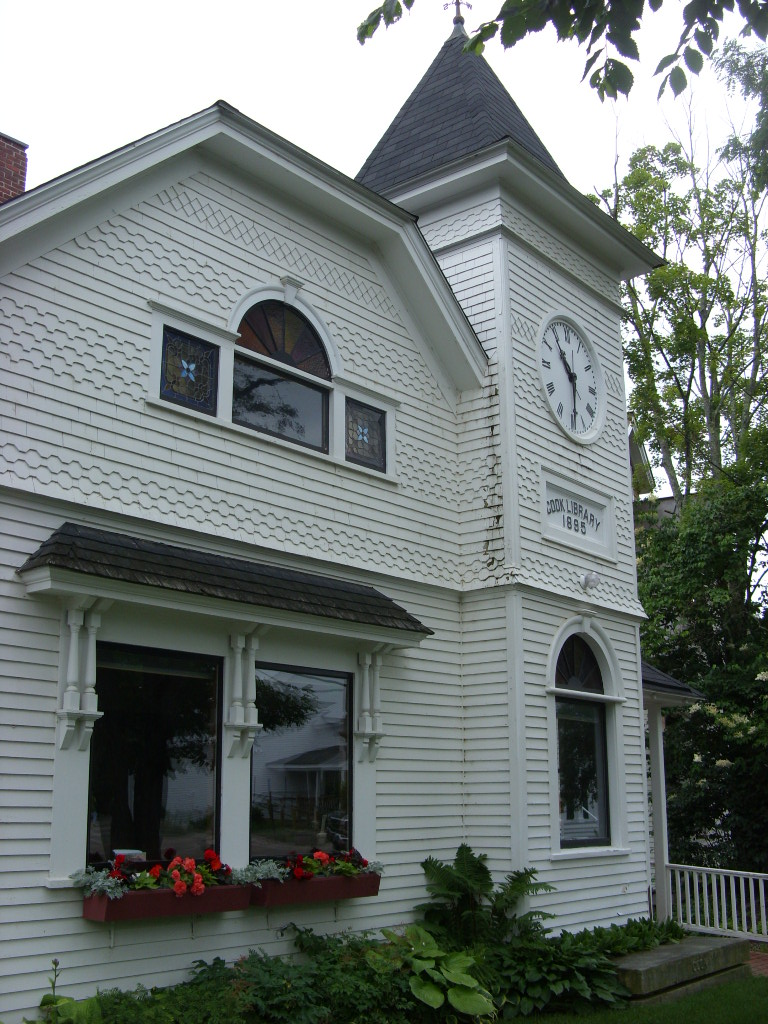

- Location within New Hampshire Location within the United States
- Location: 93 Main St., Tamworth, New Hampshire
- Coordinates: 43°51′34″N 71°15′57″W
- Area: less than one acre
- Built: 1895
- Architectural style: Queen Anne
- NRHP reference No.: 80000269
- Added to NRHP: June 25, 1980

The Cook Memorial Library is the public library of Tamworth, New Hampshire, United States. It is located at 93 Main Street in the center of the town, in an 1895 Queen Anne Victorian building which is listed on the National Register of Historic Places. The library's origins are in a private "social library" established in 1796 by Parson Samuel Hidden; the building was given in memory of Charles Cook, a prominent local businessman and politician.

== Architecture and history ==
The Cook Memorial Library stands in the modest town center of Tamworth, on the south side of Main Street just east of its junction with Great Hill Road. It is a single-story wood-frame structure, with a clipped gable roof, and an exterior finished in a combination of clapboards and decorative cut shingles. The gables extend well beyond the frame, and are supported by paired decorative brackets. A two-story square tower rises at the right front corner, with a round-arch window in the first level, and a clock in the second. It is capped by a pyramidal roof with flared edges. The front facade has a pair of windows set under a pent roof with turned brackets. The library interior retains high-quality period features, with especially fine woodwork in the main reading room.

Tamworth's library history begins in 1796, with the founding of a private subscription library, which is a direct predecessor to the present institution. Subscribers paid $3 per year for access to a collection of 600 volumes. The present library is named for Charles P. Cook a Tamworth native and successful businessman, and was funded by a gift from Cook's widow, Susan Staples Cook.

== See also ==
- National Register of Historic Places listings in Carroll County, New Hampshire
- Tamworth, New Hampshire
