= White Lake State Park =

State park in Carroll County, New Hampshire

- Location within New Hampshire
- Interactive map of White Lake State Park
- Location: Tamworth, New Hampshire, United States
- Coordinates: 43°50′27″N 71°13′20″W
- Area: 902.7 acres (365.3 ha)
- Elevation: 440 feet (130 m)
- Established: 1933
- Administrator: New Hampshire Division of Parks and Recreation
- Website: Official website
- New Hampshire State Parks

White Lake State Park is a 902.7-acre (365.3 ha) public recreation area in Tamworth, New Hampshire, in the United States. The state park surrounds 125-acre (51 ha) White Lake, a typical glacial lake. It is open year-round and offers swimming, hiking, non-motorized boating, picnicking, trout fishing, winter sports, day-use area, group areas, and seasonal camping.

The park's 72-acre (29 ha) stand of pitch pine trees was designated a National Natural Landmark in 1980. It is accessible by a walking trail that also passes a series of kettle bogs.
