= Chocorua, New Hampshire =

Unincorporated community in New Hampshire, United States

- Unincorporated community
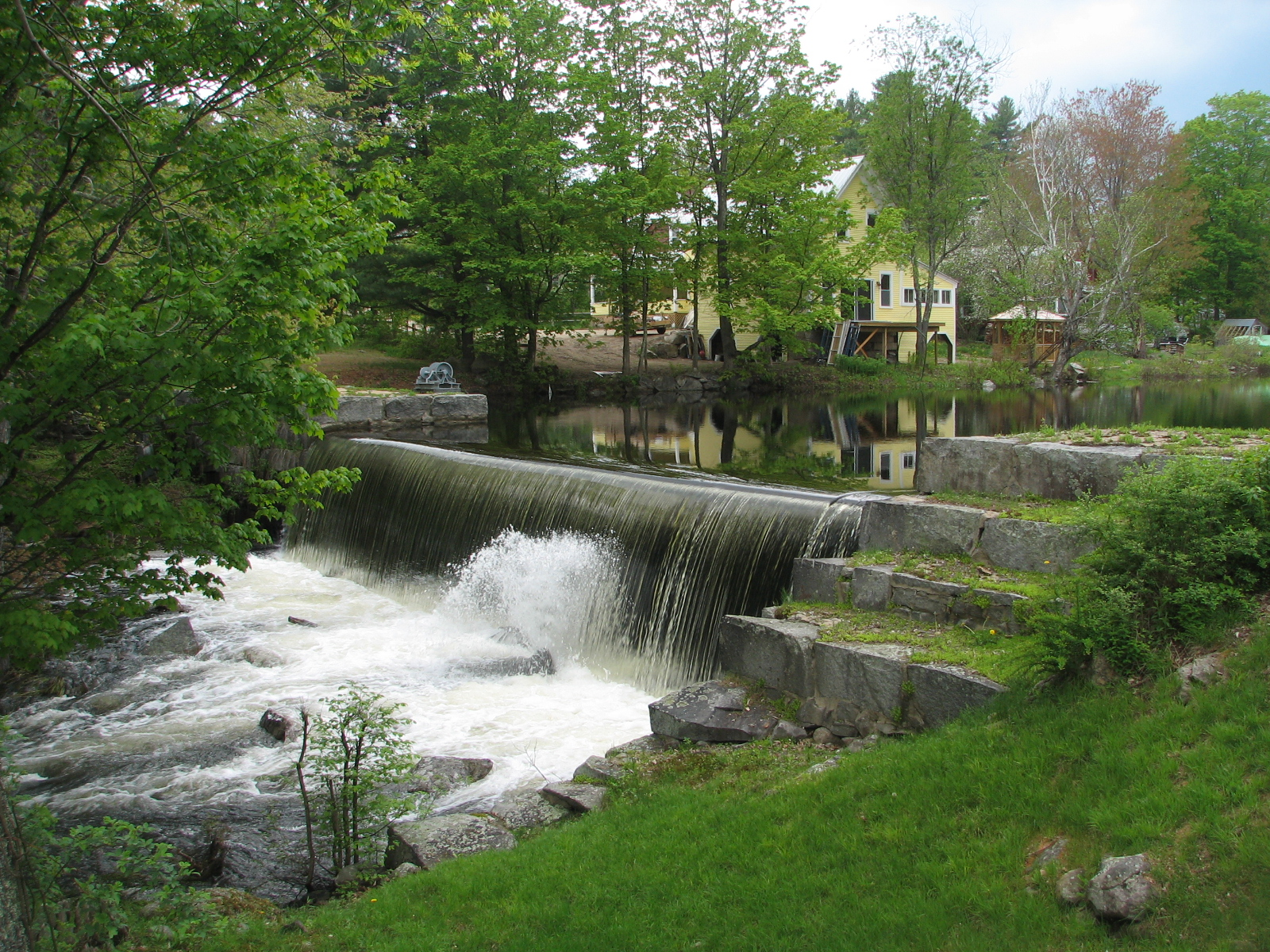
- A dam on the Chocorua River in Chocorua

- Location within New Hampshire Location within the United States
- Coordinates: 43°52′39″N 71°13′13″W
- Country: United States
- State: New Hampshire
- County: Carroll
- Town: Tamworth
- Elevation: 525 ft (160 m)
- Time zone: UTC-5 (Eastern (EST))
  - Summer (DST): UTC-4 (EDT)
- ZIP code: 03817
- Area code: 603
- GNIS feature ID: 871674

Chocorua is an unincorporated community within the town of Tamworth in Carroll County, New Hampshire, United States. It is located in the general area where Routes 16 and 113 meet, south of Mount Chocorua and Chocorua Lake.

== Notable people ==
- Truman Howe Bartlett, sculptor, Abraham Lincoln photography historian (summer resident)
- James Read Chadwick, gynecologist and medical librarian (summer resident)
- William James, philosopher and US founder of experimental psychology; died in Chocorua
- Paul Scott Mowrer, New Hampshire's first Poet Laureate; lived in Chocorua
- Hadley Richardson, the first wife of Ernest Hemingway.
- Robert I. Rotberg, former President of the World Peace Foundation (vacation resident)
