= Chocorua Lake =

Lake in Carroll County, New Hampshire

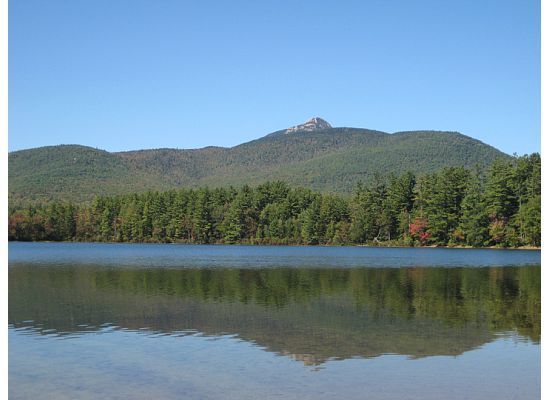
- The lake with the summit of Mount Chocorua casting a reflection

- Location within New Hampshire Location within the United States
- Location: Carroll County, New Hampshire
- Coordinates: 43°54′02″N 71°14′14″W
- Primary inflows: Chocorua River, Stratton Brook
- Primary outflows: Chocorua River
- Catchment area: 13.2 mi^{2} (34 km^{2})
- Basin countries: United States
- Max. length: 1.1 mi (1.8 km)
- Max. width: 3,500 ft (1,100 m)
- Surface area: 222 acres (90 ha)
- Average depth: 12 ft (3.7 m)
- Max. depth: 27 ft (8.2 m)
- Surface elevation: 574 ft (175 m)
- Settlements: Chocorua (town of Tamworth)

Chocorua Lake is a picturesque lake in northeast New Hampshire, United States, with commanding views of the summit of Mount Chocorua. It is approximately 1.1 miles (1.8 km) long (north-south) with a maximum width of 3,500 feet (1.1 km) (east-west), covering 222 acres (90 ha), and a maximum depth of 27 feet (8.2 m).

The lake is most noted for its calm, serene setting. There is little to no development surrounding it, and its views of the bald summit of Mount Chocorua are unblemished by radio antennas.

== Geography ==
Chocorua Lake, also commonly called Lake Chocorua, is located in east-central New Hampshire in the town of Tamworth, New Hampshire. It is located in the Ossipee Lake watershed south of the White Mountains region. The watershed is 13.2 square miles (34 km^{2}) of mostly protected forest under the management of the United States Forest Service. The main inflow into the lake is the Chocorua River from the north, which drains the south side of Mount Chocorua. Stratton Brook flows into the west side of the lake. The lake's outflow is to the south, through Little Chocorua Lake, then through a dam outfall into the Chocorua River. (Though the lake has a dammed outlet, it is a natural lake, not a reservoir, with the dam serving to maintain the water level of the lake at precisely 574 feet (175 m) above sea level.) The water from the Chocorua Lake outfall and the Chocorua River eventually reaches the Bearcamp River and enters Ossipee Lake, then the Saco River and finally the Atlantic Ocean on the coast of Maine.

== Recreation ==
Swimming, canoeing, kayaking, and fishing are popular recreation activities on the lake. Outboard motors of any kind are prohibited from using the lake. In addition, campfires and cooking fires of any kind are prohibited from the shore of the lake. Canoe and kayak access is available from The Grove off of New Hampshire Route 16 on the east side of the lake, and from the road near the bridge on the south end of the lake. There are beaches accessible from Route 16 on the east side of the lake. In addition, there are many hiking trails around the lake; most notable are the trails leading to the summit of Mount Chocorua just north of the lake.

== Wildlife ==
Fish species that live in Chocorua Lake include brook trout, smallmouth bass, black bullhead, yellow perch, rainbow trout and catfish.

Bird species that live in or migrate through the vicinity include the bald eagle, loon, and osprey.

== Water quality and environmental concerns ==
Chocorua Lake is a fragile lake due to how shallow it is. It has an average depth of 12 feet (3.7 m) and a maximum depth of 27 feet (8.2 m). Because of the lake's shallowness, sunlight reaches most of the water column. Therefore, even low concentrations of nutrients can cause plant life and algae to grow quickly, obscuring the sunlight needed for their growth, leading to a loss of oxygen in the water. Due to overdevelopment of the region and runoff from New Hampshire Route 16, phosphorus and other nutrients started showing up in the lake in higher concentrations. Algae, lily pads, and other plant life grew at a rapid rate and caused the clarity of the lake to decline. This can increase the risk of dead zones to occur in the lake. The Chocorua Lake Association (CLA), the Environmental Protection Agency (EPA), the New Hampshire Department of Transportation (NHDOT), and the Town of Tamworth began what was called the "Berms and Swales Project" in September 2000 to build berms, swales, and other filtering devices to control runoff and to filter sediments and nutrients. This critical work with the partnership among the various agencies has caused an 82% percent decline in phosphorus nutrients since 2000. This has been noted on the EPA website as one of its success stories.

== Scenery ==
The lake is surrounded by forests with very little visible human development. This provides a very natural setting that is rare to find around most lakes today due to houses, restaurants, hotels, and docks that surround most lakes. This is mostly due to the conservation easements written into the property deeds of about 60 landowners that preserved the forested buffers that surround the lake.

Visible to the north of the lake is the view of the bald summit of Mount Chocorua, which tops out at an elevation above 3,480 feet (1,060 m).

== See also ==
- List of lakes in New Hampshire
