= Steven Grasse =

American advertising executive

- Born: September 19, 1964 (age 61)
- Occupations: Advertising Executive, Author, Distillery owner
- Years active: 1989-present
- Known for: Quaker City Mercantile; Hendrick's Gin; Sailor Jerry rum; Tamworth Distilling
- Notable work: Backcountry Cocktails; Colonial Spirits; Evil Empire

Steven Grasse (born September 19, 1964) is an American advertising executive, author, distillery owner and the founder of Quaker City Mercantile. Grasse was called the "punk rock prince of small-batch spirits" by Alex Halberstadt. On March 14, 2023, Grasse was recognized as one of the "Drinks Innovators of the Year" by Food & Wine for his work with Tamworth Distilling.

== Early life and career ==
Steven Grasse grew up in Souderton, Pennsylvania, as part of a Pennsylvania Dutch family. As a teenager, he worked for Indian Valley Printing, his father's company, while attending Souderton Area High School. Grasse was inspired by the work of English music promoter Malcolm McLaren, and decided to study marketing and advertising at Syracuse University. He went on to intern at several advertising agencies before being hired by Saatchi & Saatchi.

== Career ==
=== 1989–2006 ===
Grasse founded Quaker City Mercantile (formerly Gyro Worldwide), a Philadelphia-based advertising agency, in 1989. Grasse has said that his approach to advertising was inspired by the way bands promote themselves, which draw in a loyal following by building a sense of community around their brand.

This approach influenced the marketing strategy of Sailor Jerry's Rum, a spirit brand which became the fastest growing rum brand in the United States, and was acquired by William Grant & Sons in 2008. Grasse had previously partnered with William Grant & Sons in 1998 to create Hendrick's Gin. Beginning in 1999, Grasse began producing Bikini Bandits, a series of short films. A feature film based on the franchise was planned to be produced by StudioCanal but was later cancelled.

=== 2007–present ===
In February 2007, Grasse founded the Coalition for British Reparations, and started a petition for the British government to pay US$58 trillion in reparations for damages he alleged the British Empire had done to the world at large. He described the petition as "performance art", stating that "It's very serious, but very cheeky". Grasse authored the controversial book The Evil Empire: 101 Ways That England Ruined the World which was published on April 23, 2007.

In 2009, Gyro Worldwide was renamed as Quaker City Mercantile. During this time, Grasse also began marketing his own brands, and founded Art in the Age of Reproduction, a retail store in Philadelphia. Grasse cited Walter Benjamin's 1935 essay "The Work of Art in the Age of Mechanical Reproduction" with inspiring the idea behind the company.

In 2016, Grasse authored Colonial Spirits: A Toast to Our Drunken History, which explores the history of alcohol in Colonial America. The illustrated book included historical recipes and trivia about the history of alcohol in the United States. In its opening chapter, he compares the United States to a bar, "open to everyone, available to whoever can afford it, and apparently quite difficult to get kicked out of."

Grasse founded Tamworth Distillery, a New Hampshire based craft distillery, in 2015. Inspired by his interest in transcendentalism and a desire to create a lasting legacy, Grasse developed the concept of a "farm-to-table, grain-to-glass" distillery with Jamie Oakes and Matt Powers. The distillery focuses on a wilderness-to-table philosophy, and creates a variety of craft spirits. In 2022, Tamworth produced Crab Trapper, a bourbon distilled with invasive green crabs.

In 2021, he cowrote The Cocktail Workshop with Adam Erace. The book, which includes drink recipes, lessons on mixology, and history, was published by Running Press. In 2022, Grasse co-wrote Brand Mysticism: Cultivate Creativity and Intoxicate Your Audience with journalist Aaron Goldfarb. Part-memoir, part business and marketing guide, Grasse details how he created such booze brands as Hendrick's Gin and Sailor Jerry Rum. Grasse co-wrote Backcountry Cocktails: Civilized Drinks for Wild Places with journalist Adam Erace, published May 9, 2023 by Running Press. The book includes information on cocktails, wilderness survival, wildlife behavior, and foraging.

== Publications ==
- Backcountry Cocktails: Civilized Drinks for Wild Places. (2023) with Adam Erace. Running Press.
- Brand Mysticism. (2022) with Aaron Goldfarb. Running Press.
- The Cocktail Workshop. (2021) with Adam Erace. Running Press. ISBN 9780762472987
- The Good Reverend's Guide to Infused Spirits. (2019) with Sonia Kurtz, Michael Alan. Skyhorse PublishingISBN 9781510739758
- Colonial Spirits: A Toast to Our Drunken History. (2016). Harry N. Abrams. ISBN 978-1-4197-2230-1
- The Evil Empire: 101 Ways That England Ruined the World. (2007). Quirk Books. ISBN 1-59474-173-5
