= Sailor Jerry =

American tattoo artist (1911–1973)

- Born: Norman Keith Collins; January 14, 1911; Reno, Nevada, U.S.
- Died: June 12, 1973 (aged 62); Honolulu, Hawaii, U.S.
- Other names: Norman K. Collins, Norman "Sailor Jerry" Collins, NKC, Sailor Jerry, SJ
- Occupations: Tattoo artist, sailor, musician
- Spouse: Louise Collins

Norman Keith Collins (January 14, 1911 – June 12, 1973), known popularly as Sailor Jerry, was a prominent American tattoo artist in Hawaii who was well known for his tattoo designs and is known as one of the people that started the American Traditional tattoo style.

== Early life ==
Norman Keith Collins was born on January 14, 1911, in Reno but grew up in Northern California. As a teenager he hopped freight trains across the country and learned tattooing from a man named "Big Mike" from Palmer, Alaska, originally using the hand-poke method. In the late 1920s he met Gib "Tatts" Thomas from Chicago who taught him how to use a tattoo machine. He practiced on drunks brought in from Skid Row.

At age 19, Collins enlisted in the United States Navy. During his subsequent travels at sea, he was exposed to the art and imagery of Southeast Asia.

He moved to Hawaii in the 1930s.

== Career ==
Sailor Jerry made significant contributions to the art of tattooing. He expanded the array of tattoo ink colors available by developing his own pigments. He created custom needle formations that embedded pigment with much less trauma to the skin. He became one of the first artists to utilize single-use needles. His tattoo studio was one of the first to use an autoclave to sterilize equipment.

Collins's last studio was at 1033 Smith Street in Honolulu's Chinatown. At the time, it was the only place on the island where tattoo studios were located. His studio became China Sea Tattoo after his death. His earlier studios were at 434 South State Street, 150 North Hotel Street and 13 South Hotel Street.

Collins developed tattoo designs with inspiration from sailor tattoos and Japanese tattoos. He reworked 1920s–1930s designs with influences from Japanese artists, creating American traditional designs that appealed to a wider audience. Among Sailor Jerry's well-known designs were sailing ships, pin-up girls, and dragons. He frequently incorporated snakes, skulls, knives, and roses. His designs also included:

- Bottles of alcohol
- Wildcats
- The "Aloha" monkey
- Eagles, falcons and other birds of prey
- Swallows
- Motor heads and pistons
- Nautical stars
- Classically styled scroll banners
- Dice
- Anchors
- Hawaii themes

In the 1950s he worked as a licensed skipper of a tour ship.

== Legacy ==
Sailor Jerry's influence on the art of modern tattooing is widely recognized.

A documentary film about his life, Hori Smoku Sailor Jerry, was released in 2008. The film is available on DVD or for free via YouTube.

His flash drawings were shown in a museum exhibit at the Musée du quai Branly, Paris, and the Field Museum, Chicago.

Since 2015, an annual independently-produced event has taken place in June, called the "Sailor Jerry Festival", to honor Collins' legacy in Honolulu's Chinatown. The event has included such things as live music, art exhibits, comedy, movie screenings, a fashion show, neighborhood tours, and tattoos available at area shops. The event is Collins family approved, many of whom have attended multiple festival dates and even been part of official meet-and-greet parties. Things expanded to include an annual 'Birthday Bash' edition every January. Both the January and June festivals aim to celebrate and educate. They are not tied to the rum company.

=== Image rights ===
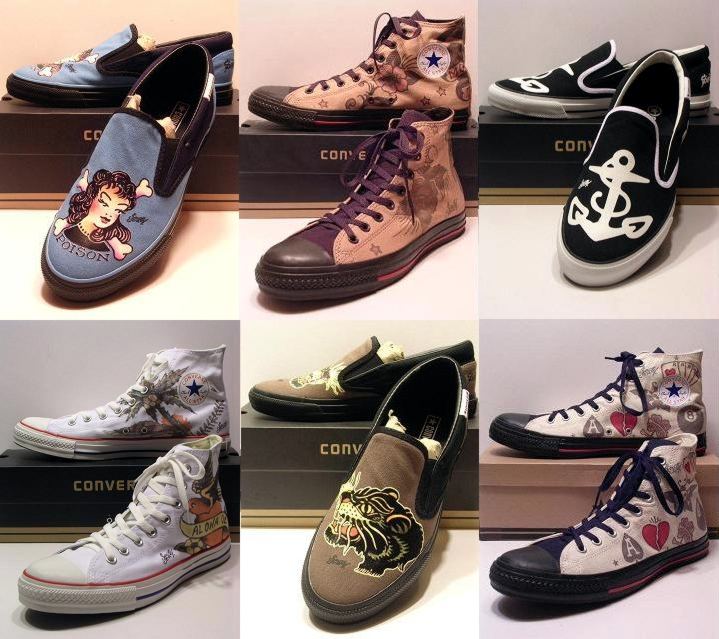
Converse shoes with designs based on Sailor Jerry tattoo artwork

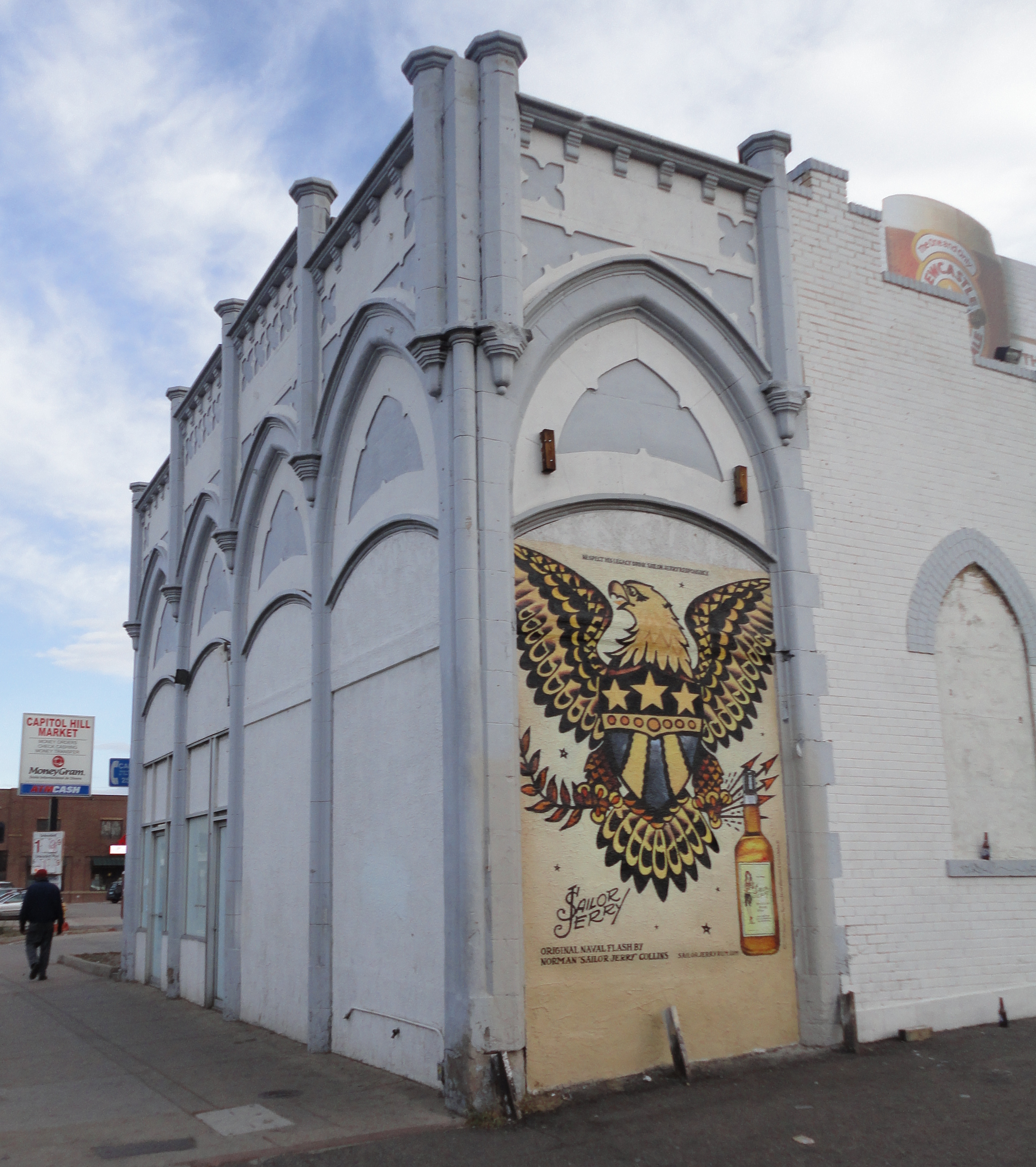
Ad for Sailor Jerry rum in 2010

Sailor Jerry wanted at least one of three protégés/friends – Ed Hardy, Mike Malone, or Zeke Owen – to take over his shop (or else burn it) when he died. Malone purchased the shop and its contents.

In 1999, Ed Hardy and Mike Malone partnered with Steven Grasse from the Philadelphia-based creative agency, Quaker City Mercantile, to establish Sailor Jerry Ltd. The limited company, which owns the commercial rights to Collins' letters, art, and flash, uses his designs on clothing and items such as ash trays, sneakers, playing cards, churchkeys, and shot glasses.

Sailor Jerry Ltd. produced a 92-proof spiced "navy rum" featuring a Sailor Jerry hula girl on the label. As the bottle is emptied, additional pin-up girls designed by Sailor Jerry are visible on the inner side of the label. The rum business was purchased by William Grant & Sons in 2008.

In 2019, widow Louise Collins sued William Grant & Sons for unauthorized use of the Sailor Jerry name and imagery for their rum, claiming that she was not properly paid for the naming rights and that he would not have approved of the sale of alcohol using his name. She was paid $20,000 for his shop and its contents in 1973 but disputed whether this sale included intellectual property or personality rights. The lawsuit was settled in 2020.

== Personal life ==
Collins played the saxophone in a dance band and frequently hosted his own radio show, where he was known as "Old Ironsides".

He was known for being stubborn. He had conservative politics and disagreed with taxes.

Collins died on June 12, 1973, survived by his wife Louise and four children. She was his fifth wife. He is buried in the National Memorial Cemetery of the Pacific, a military cemetery located in Punchbowl Crater in Honolulu.

== See also ==
- August Coleman
- Cliff Raven
- Lyle Tuttle
- Shanghai Kate Hellenbrand
