= List of U.S. state dogs =

Official state dog breeds

A map of the US showing in red which states have a specified dog breed as an official symbol

Sixteen states of the United States have designated an official state dog breed. Maryland was first to name a dog breed as a state symbol, with the Chesapeake Bay Retriever in 1964, and Pennsylvania followed the year after with the Great Dane. Dog breeds are mostly affiliated with the states where they originated. North Carolina chose the Plott Hound as it was the only dog breed indigenous to the state.

Other official state dogs indigenous to their state include the Boston Terrier (Massachusetts) and the Alaskan Malamute (Alaska). Pennsylvania selected the Great Dane not because of its origin, but because it was introduced by early settlers in the state as a hunting and working dog; it was chosen over the Beagle which was also proposed around the same time.

Two successful campaigns to name a state dog have been started by schoolchildren. In 2007, Alaskan kindergarten student Paige Hill's idea created the campaign for the Alaskan Malamute which convinced Representative Berta Gardner to support the bill in 2009, with it becoming law in 2010. Elementary school students from Bedford, New Hampshire won their campaign for the Chinook to be their state dog in 2010.

Georgia's attempt to adopt the Golden Retriever failed a vote in the Georgia State Senate in 1991; an opposing campaign promoted the Bulldog, the mascot of the University of Georgia. The Washington House of Representatives rejected a campaign to adopt the Siberian Husky in 2004. In January 2019, Minnesota partnered with charity Pawsitivity Service Dogs to introduce a bill to make the Labrador Retriever the State Dog.

In 2006, New York State Assembly member Vincent Ignizio suggested that New York adopt a dog as a state symbol; in 2015, the "working dog"—animals trained for service roles—was adopted. During the 2008 campaign to name the western painted turtle as Colorado's state reptile, local press suggested the Labrador Retriever as a suitable symbol, although not native to the state. Kansas residents suggested the Cairn Terrier as state dog in 2006 due to its appearance as Toto in the film The Wizard of Oz. Kansas representative Ed Trimmer tabled a bill proposing the Cairn Terrier in 2012.

South Dakota does not have a state dog but lists the coyote—a canine species related to the dog—as its state wildlife animal. Legislation has been proposed on six occasions in Minnesota to adopt the eastern timber wolf—another canine— as state animal. Arkansas adopted the Labrador Retriever in April 2025.

In 2013, Colorado made rescue dogs and cats as the state pet, as did Tennessee in 2014, California in 2015 (to promote pet adoptions from shelters), Illinois in 2017, Georgia in 2018 ("adoptable dogs"), and Delaware in 2023 (replacing the Golden Retriever).

== State dog breeds ==
State	Dog breed	Image	Year of designation	Ref.
Alaska	Alaskan Malamute	A white and grey husky-like dog faces left. Its tail curves over its back.	2010	
Arkansas	Labrador Retriever	side view of a yellow dog in a grassy field, facing left	2025	
Connecticut	Siberian Husky	A dark grey and white wolf like dog faces left in profile.	2024	
Delaware	Rescue Dogs	A golden fluffy colored medium-size dog faces left in a woodland setting.	2023	
Louisiana	Catahoula Leopard Dog	A mottled brown dog with a white chest faces right. It wears a red collar.	1979	
Maine	Seppala Siberian sleddog	Two dogs in sled harnesses	2025	
Maryland	Chesapeake Bay Retriever	A brown dog faces left.	1964	
Massachusetts	Boston Terrier	A brown and white dog turns to face the camera. Its ear's stand up on top of its head.	1979	
New Hampshire	Chinook	A light brown dog stands in woodland. It faces left but has turned its head to face the camera.	2009	
North Carolina	Plott Hound	A dark colored mottled dog faces right while sniffing the ground.	1989	
Pennsylvania	Great Dane	A large white dog with black patches stands next to a trophy.	1965	
South Carolina	Boykin Spaniel	A brown spaniel faces the camera in the snow.	1985	
Tennessee	Bluetick Coonhound		2019	
Texas	Blue Lacy	A dark grey colored dog faces just to the right, it wears a large tag on its collar.	2005	
Virginia	American Foxhound	A mostly white dog with black and brown markings faces left with its head turned to the camera.	1966	
Wisconsin	American Water Spaniel	A curly coated dark brown colored spaniel stands next to its owner.	1985	

=== Proposed dog breeds ===
The table below shows the dog breeds which have been proposed to each state's relevant State Senate or House of Representatives, but either were not accepted as a state symbol or are still pending nominations.

State	Dog breed	Image	Year proposed	Ref.
Georgia	Golden Retriever	A golden fluffy colored medium-size dog faces left in a woodland setting.	1991	
Georgia	English bulldog	A stocky brown and white dog.	2016	
Kansas	Cairn Terrier	A small mottled brown dog.	2012	
Ohio	Labrador Retriever	A black Labrador Retriever at a confirmation show	2015	
Oregon	Newfoundland	Black Newfoundland	2015	
Washington	Siberian Husky	A dark grey and white wolf like dog faces left in profile.	2004	

== Designations other than breed ==
State	Designation	Image	Year of designation	Ref.
Georgia	"Adoptable dog"	"Dog in animal shelter"	2016	
New Jersey	The Seeing Eye Dog	"A Seeing Eye Dog"	2019	
New York	Working dog	"A labrador retriever in service as a guide dog"	2015	

== See also ==
- List of U.S. state mammals
- Dogs in the United States
