= Quaker City Mercantile =

Coordinates: 39.9499°N 75.1451°W

- Formerly: Gyro Worldwide
- Industry: Alcohol industry, marketing strategy
- Founded: 1989
- Founder: Steven Grasse
- Headquarters: Philadelphia, Pennsylvania
- Services: Art in the Age of Mechanical Reproduction; Quaker City Shrubs; Lo-Fi Aperitifs

Quaker City Mercantile is an independent advertising agency and distiller specializing in strategy, marketing, design, and branding for the alcohol industry. In addition to partnering with other brands, the company also owns its own distilleries and breweries. It was founded in 1989 by Steven Grasse in Philadelphia, Pennsylvania. Over the course of its history, Quaker City Mercantile has partnered with brands such as Guinness, Miller, Narragansett Brewing Company, M&M/Mars, R. J. Reynolds Tobacco Company, Sailor Jerry and Puma.

== History ==
Gyro Worldwide was founded in Society Hill, Philadelphia in 1989 by Steven Grasse. The agency used a marketing strategy inspired by Grasse's belief that successful brands built passion and excitement by promoting their content and creating a sense of identity based around it, rather than pushing a product. After developing a series of controversial advertisements featuring Charles Manson for a Philadelphia clothing store called Zipperhead, the company was dropped by several clients such as Comcast. However, the controversy also helped to increase the company's publicity and led to partnerships with brands such as MTV. The company became known for guerilla marketing and controversial advertising campaigns.

The company moved its headquarters to Washington Square West, Philadelphia into a building owned by Tony Goldman, who was attempting to gentrify the neighborhood. Gyro Worldwide later collaborated with James McManahan to help rebrand the neighborhood, coining the term "Midtown Village" for the area.

Gyro Worldwide was hired by the Scottish brand Hendrick's Gin in 1998. That same year, the company began working with Don Ed Hardy and Mike Malone to create merchandise based on Sailor Jerry's life and work, and Gyro Worldwide acquired the intellectual rights to the brand from Hardy and Malone in 2003. Gyro Worldwide sold the brand to William Grant & Sons in 2008, while continuing to create merchandise and advertising for William Grant & Sons.

As part of a self-promotional campaign in 2008, Gyro Worldwide released Virus: The Outrageous History of Gyro, which was purportedly written by a fictitious French scholar named Harriet Bernard-Levy and published by "Gold Crown Press".

In 2009, Gyro Worldwide rebranded as Quaker City Mercantile, and announced that it would be placing a new focus on creating its own products. The company maintains a workforce that includes distillers, brewers, mixologists, chefs, chemists, botanists and creative teams from various disciplines. After rebranding, Quaker City Mercantile launched Art in the Age of Mechanical Reproduction, a brand of spirits.

In 2014, Diageo engaged Quaker City Mercantile to advertise the Guinness brand. In 2016, Quaker City Mercantile began working with MillerCoors after the latter dropped Leo Burnett Worldwide as its advertising agency. Later that year, Quaker City Mercantile partnered with Diageo to produce a series of hard sodas under the Quaker City Malting Co. brand.

Quaker City Mercantile has launched other alcohol brands of its own, such as Quaker City Shrubs and Lo-Fi Aperitifs.
