= Mount Chocorua =

Mountain in New Hampshire, United States

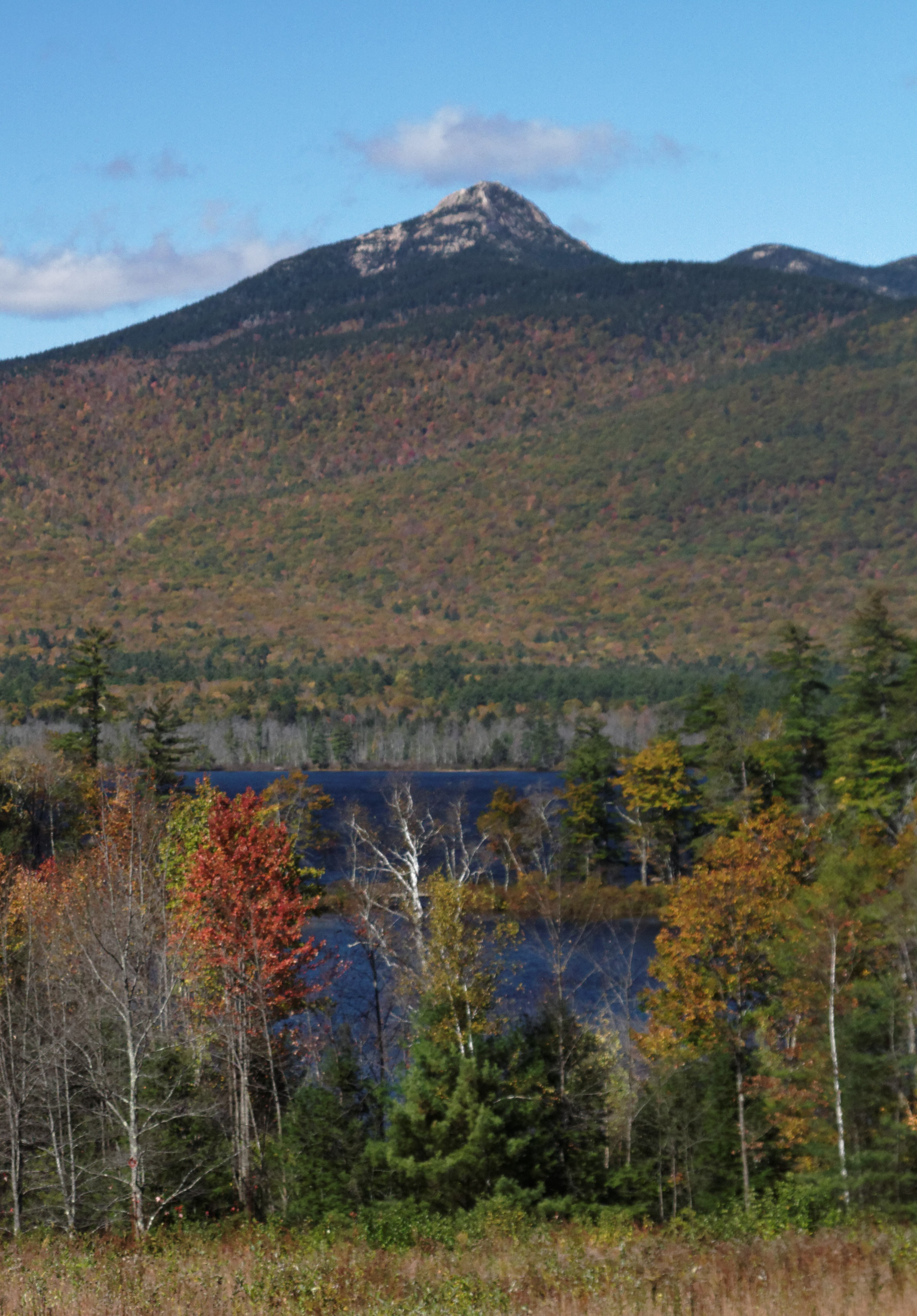
- Mount Chocorua and Chocorua Lake

Highest point
- Elevation: 3,480 ft (1,060 m)
- Prominence: 1,240 ft (380 m)
- Coordinates: 43°57′15″N 71°16′24″W

Geography
- Location within New Hampshire
- Location: Albany, New Hampshire, U.S.
- Parent range: Sandwich Range, White Mountains
- Topo map: USGS Mount Chocorua

Climbing
- Easiest route: Piper Trail; Champney Falls Trail; Liberty Trail

Mount Chocorua (/ʃəˈkɔːrwə/) is a 3,490 ft (1,060 m) mountain in the White Mountains of New Hampshire, the easternmost peak of the Sandwich Range. Although the mountain is not outstanding for its elevation, it is very rugged and has excellent views of the surrounding lakes, mountains, and forests. Being at the end of the range, its bare summit can be seen from almost every direction and identified from many points throughout central New Hampshire and western Maine, and it has been the subject of numerous works of art. Many hiking trails ascend the mountain. Scenic Chocorua Lake lies directly to the south.

== Name ==
Chocorua is probably an Algonquin word that means "Rocky Home of the Water Serpent". Primary sources from the 1760s record the name as "Coruway", with "Chokurua" appearing in maps from 1791.

"Coruway" was a European corruption of the pre-Columbian corua, which was used to refer to a serpent that guards mountain springs. These serpents, which were believed to be messengers from the underworld, lived in crevices in high places.

Choc comes from an Eastern Algonquin word for "heavily eroded rocks" (see Chic-Choc Mountains in Quebec, Canada).

The mountain name combines choc and corua for "rocky home of the water serpent."

== Geography ==
Mount Chocorua is in the town of Albany and is the easternmost peak of the Sandwich Range in New Hampshire's White Mountain National Forest. The Sandwich Range is located north of the Lakes Region and south of the Kancamagus Highway. The range extends about 30 miles (50 km) east-west from Conway on the Saco River to Campton on the Pemigewasset.

Chocorua's summit is a picturesque rocky cone, and the mountain is purported to be one of the most photographed in the world. The view from Chocorua Lake, which often casts a reflection of the mountaintop, was chosen to represent the White Mountain National Forest on the New Hampshire quarter issued by the U.S. Mint in 2013 as part of its America the Beautiful coin series.

The Chocorua Lake basin is protected by the Chocorua Lake Conservancy, previously the Chocorua Lake Association & Chocorua Lake Conservation Foundation.

== Hiking trails ==
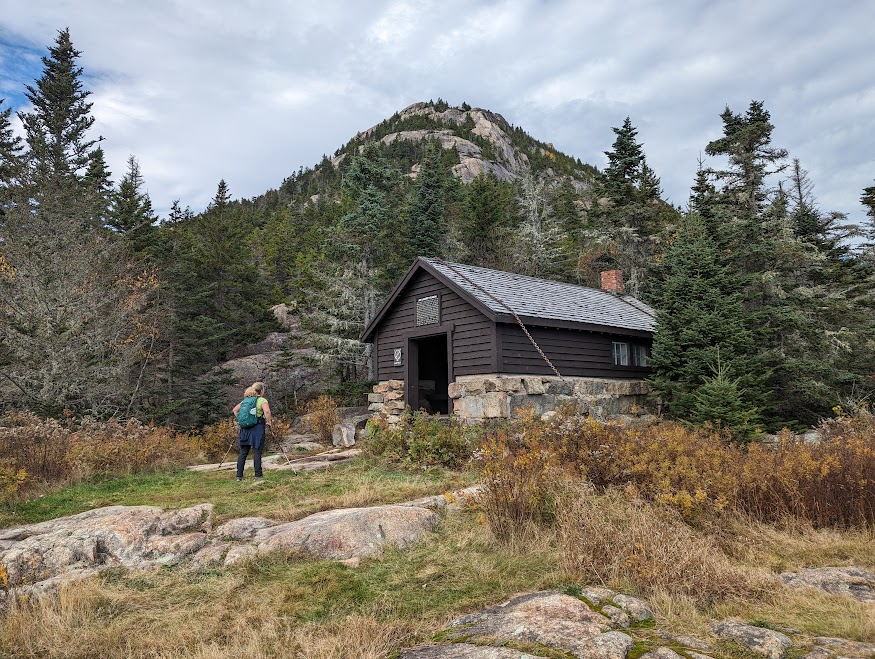
A hiker at Jim Liberty Cabin, with the mountain's peak in the background.

Although Mount Chocorua is under 3,500 feet (1,100 m) in elevation, its bare and rocky summit commands excellent views in all directions. There are many trails up the mountain, and they can be quite crowded during the summer months. Especially popular are the Piper Trail (4.2 miles (6.8 km) each way from the east), the Champney Falls Trail (from the north), and the Liberty Trail (from the southwest). Trails on the southeastern section of the mountain, as well as trails on Mount Paugus immediately to the west of Chocorua, are maintained by the Chocorua Mountain Club, an all-volunteer crew since 1908.

Hiking trails include Liberty Trail, Brook Trail, Bolles Trail, Bee Line Trail, Champney Falls Trail, Middle Sister Trail, Carter Ledge Trail, Nickerson Ledge Trail, Piper Trail, Weetamoo Trail, and Hammond Trail.

== Legends ==
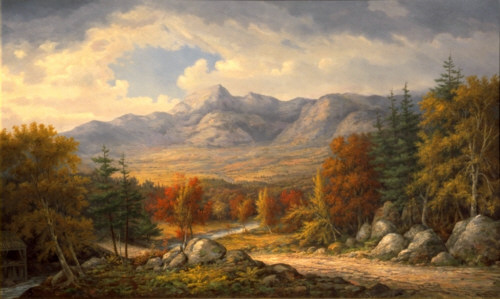
Mount Chocorua, John White Allen Scott (1815–1907)

The Chocorua legend tells of a Native American prophet or chief, Chocorua, who is supposed to have lived near the mountain at the dawn of white settlement, although no authentic records of his life are known to exist. The usual story—much of it drawn from a short work of fiction by Lydia Maria Child—is that in about 1720 Chocorua was on friendly terms with settlers and in particular the Campbell family that had a home in the valley now called Tamworth. Chocorua was called away and left his son in the care of the Campbell family. The boy found and drank a poison that Mr. Campbell had made to eliminate troublesome foxes, and Chocorua returned to find his son had died. Chocorua, distraught with grief, pledged revenge on the family. Shortly thereafter, Mr. Campbell returned home one afternoon to find his wife and children had been slain. Campbell suspected Chocorua and pursued him up the mountain. Chocorua was wounded by a shot from Campbell's rifle and, uttering a curse upon the white settlers, he leaped from the summit to his death.

There are at least three other versions of the legend of Chocorua. One is that Chocorua simply fell from a high rock on the mountain while hunting. A second is the white settlers pursued Chocorua up the mountain after an Indian massacre, and he leaped to his death. The third is that all the white settlers pursued him with guns, pitchforks, and torches. As Chocorua reached the top, the settlers decided to torch the remaining trees and in doing so they burned and exposed the topsoil of the last 1,270 feet (390 m). As the flames drew closer to Chocorua, he cursed the white men and leaped to his death.

=== The curse ===
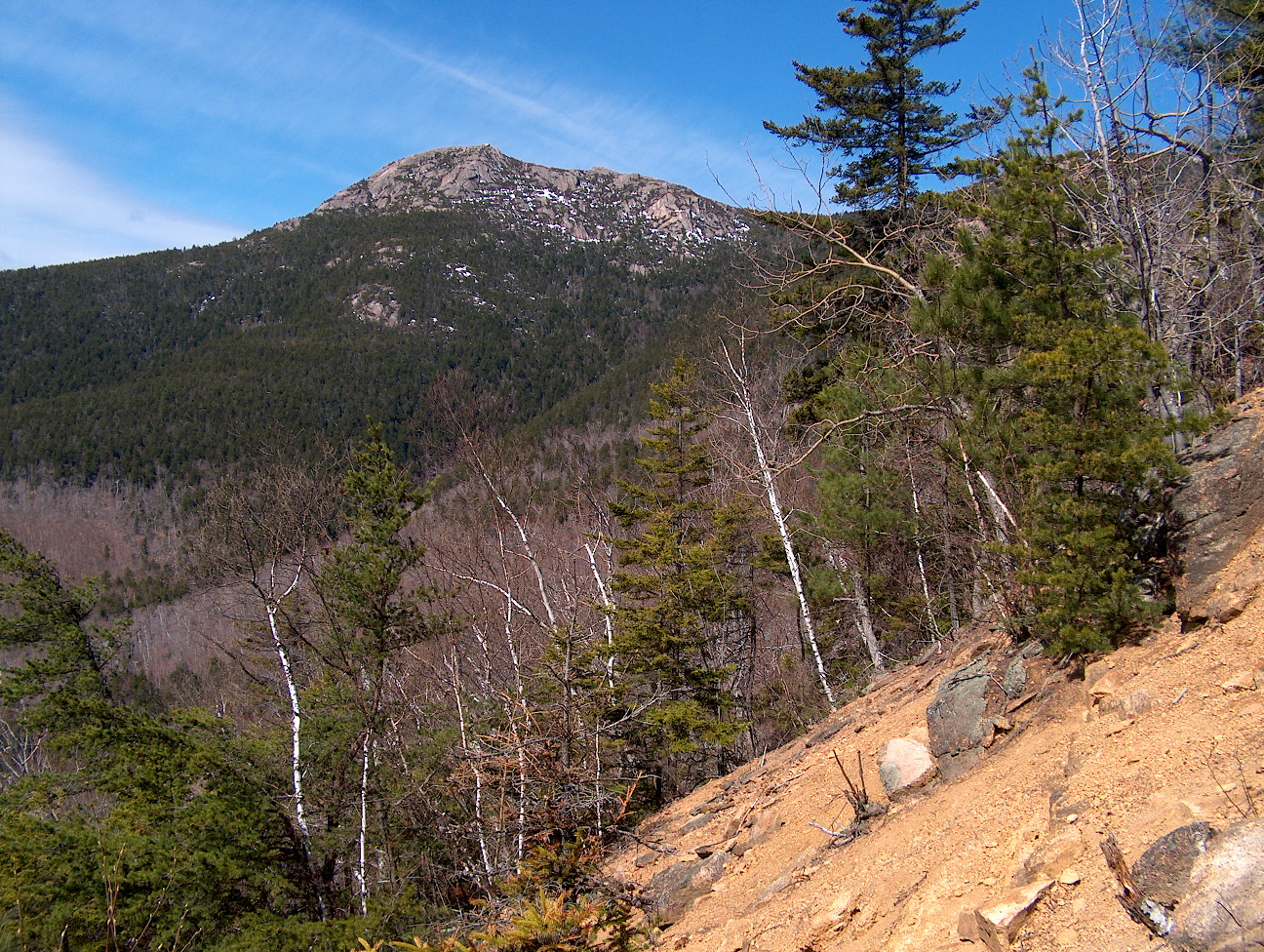
The east face of Mount Chocorua from Carter Ledge

Although the exact words of Chocorua's curse (or even if there was a curse) are not known, it has been reported (Mudge, page 34) to be as follows.

"May the Great Spirit curse you when he speaks in the clouds and his words are fire! Lightning blast your crops! Wind and fire destroy your homes! The Evil One breathe death on your cattle! Panthers howl and wolves fatten on your bones!"

Another version appears in the story "Chocorua's Curse", by Lydia Maria Child, contained in The Token (1830):

"A curse upon ye, white men! May the Great Spirit curse ye when he speaks in the clouds, and his words are fire! Chocorua had a son — and ye killed him while the sky looked bright! Lightning, blast your crops! Wind and fire destroy your dwellings! The Evil Spirit breathe death upon your cattle! Your graves lie in the war path of the Indian! Panthers howl, and wolves fatten over your bones! Chocorua goes to the Great Spirit — his curse stays with the white men!"

The Chocorua legend is featured on a New Hampshire historical marker (number 31) along New Hampshire Route 16 in Tamworth.

== Cultural references ==
=== Paintings ===
Mount Chocorua, with its alpine spur, reflecting lake, wide viewscape, and romantic legend, has long attracted the attention of American artists. Art historian Robert L. McGrath has written:

"In terms of the broader history of American art, no mountain has figured more prominently in the representation of the national landscape. Without exception, Chocorua has been more frequently depicted than any other peak..."

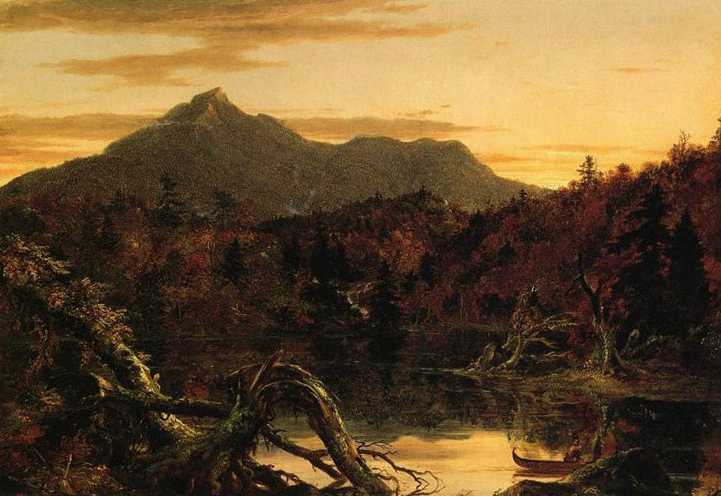
Autumn Twilight, View of Conway Peak (Mount Chocorua), Thomas Cole (1801–1848)

Early 19th century painters of Chocorua included Thomas Cole, who used the mountain again and again in his paintings as his vision of America and the human experience evolved. Cole is considered a founder of the Hudson River School of American artists, which to a considerable extent overlapped with the "White Mountain School" of painters.

Among the hundreds of artists who have painted Chocorua are Asher Brown Durand, Benjamin Champney, Thomas Doughty, Aaron Draper Shattuck, David Johnson, Albert Bierstadt, Sanford Gifford, Alfred Thompson Bricher, John Marin, E. E. Cummings, and Frank Stella. Among the most notable artists who have painted in the White Mountains was John Frederick Kensett (1816–1872). A painter of the Hudson River School, his Mount Chocorua (1864–1866) typifies American Luminism.

The Hartwell Memorial Window depicting Mount Chocorua, designed by Tiffany Studios as a commission in honor of Frederick Hartwell, is installed in the Art Institute of Chicago. Originally housed in the Central Baptist Church of Providence, Rhode Island, it was relocated in 2018. The window was inspired by the view from the Hartwell family home.

=== Literature ===
Wallace Stevens (1879–1955) mentions Mount Chocorua in stanza XXI of his poem "The Man with the Blue Guitar". It is also the subject of his poem "Chocorua To Its Neighbor".

Ezra Pound mentions Chocorua at least twice in the Pisan Cantos: "...For the purity of the air on Chocorua / in a land of maple..."

Cedric H. Whitman (1916–1979), Elliot Professor of Greek Literature at Harvard University, wrote a narrative poem, "Chocorua", published posthumously in 1983.

Most of the events in John Bellairs' novel The Mummy, the Will, and the Crypt happen near this mountain.

=== Music ===
The American composer Alan Hovhaness (1911–2000), who often climbed the White Mountains during his childhood, composed a piano sonata named "Mt. Chocorua" (Op. 335) in 1982.

Mount Chocorua features prominently in songs by New Hampshire native rock band Scissorfight, including "Mount Chocorua Woman" from the 1996 album Guaranteed Kill.

== Panorama ==
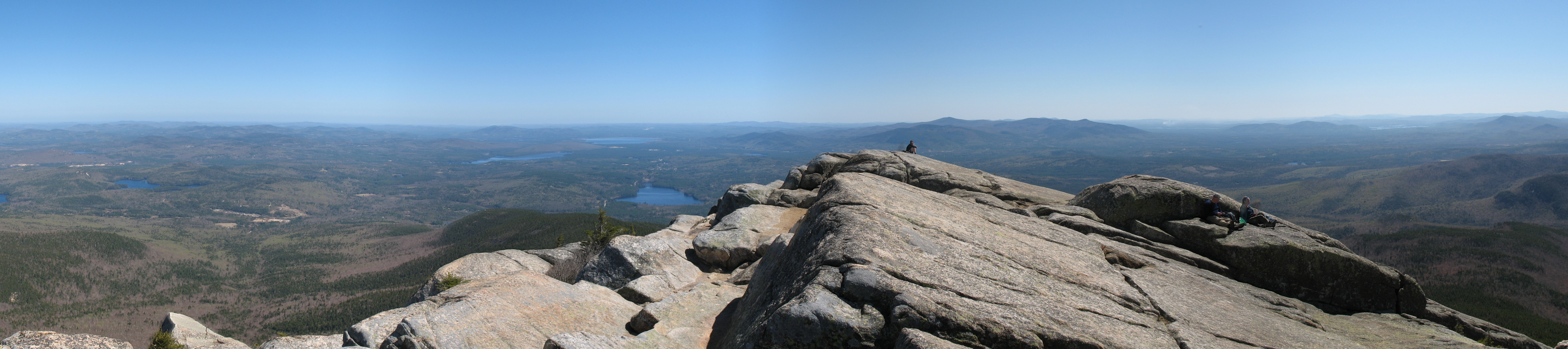
Looking south from the summit, 2013
