= Ferncroft, New Hampshire =

Unincorporated community in New Hampshire, United States

- Unincorporated community
- Mount Whiteface (L) and Mount Wonalancet rising over Ferncroft (April 2024)

- Location within New Hampshire Location within the United States
- Coordinates: 43°54′44″N 71°21′35″W
- Country: United States
- State: New Hampshire
- County: Carroll
- Towns: Albany, Sandwich
- Elevation: 1,148 ft (350 m)
- Time zone: UTC-5 (Eastern (EST))
  - Summer (DST): UTC-4 (EDT)
- Area code: 603
- GNIS feature ID: 871878

Ferncroft is an unincorporated community lying mostly in the town of Albany in Carroll County, New Hampshire, United States. Some of the roads and houses in Ferncroft stretch into the towns of Sandwich and Waterville Valley. The hamlet is a widely spaced cluster of houses centered on several fields lying along the Wonalancet River on Ferncroft Road.

Ferncroft has about 50 seasonal residents and a few full-time residents residing in 11 houses and multiple barns and outbuildings.

Ferncroft was named for the Ferncroft Family Inn which once stood in the area. The area became known as Ferncroft to differentiate it from nearby Wonalancet.

== Location ==
Ferncroft lies 7 miles (11 km) northeast of North Sandwich and 7 miles (11 km) northwest of Tamworth, off New Hampshire Route 113A. Ferncroft is located in a glen, dale, or dell, known as Birch Intervale. It lies south of a cirque known as "The Bowl". Mountains surround the hamlet on three sides, and Ferncroft Road is the only way in or out, aside from hiking trails. This makes the village rather inaccessible. In fact, the closest town center by road is Tamworth, seven miles away. The center of Albany, Ferncroft's main parent town, is 18.5 miles (29.8 km) away. Some of the houses in Ferncroft lie within the Waterville Valley town limits; however, the center of Waterville Valley is 47 miles (76 km) and 1.5 hours away by car.

== Recreation ==
Ferncroft is a popular hiking center in summer, with several major trails beginning from a parking lot on the east side of Ferncroft Road. The trails travel into the Sandwich Range Wilderness and are maintained by the Wonalancet Out-Door Club and United States Forest Service. Mount Whiteface, Mount Passaconaway, Mount Wonalancet and Mount Paugus are just a few of the peaks easily accessible from Ferncroft.

In winter many shorter trails in the area are maintained and groomed by the Tamworth Outing Club for Nordic skiing. Historically, every February a 10-kilometer (6.2 mi) classic style Nordic ski race was held in Ferncroft on these trails, known as the Wonalancet Wander.

== Confusion with Wonalancet ==
Ferncroft can often be confused with the neighboring village of Wonalancet in the town of Tamworth. During the time when the Ferncroft Inn was operating, Ferncroft was considered a part of Wonalancet village. The general distinction today is that the area within Tamworth is known as Wonalancet, while the area in the remaining three towns of Albany, Sandwich and Waterville Valley is known as Ferncroft. The Wonalancet Chapel and former post office (now a private residence) are located at the beginning of Ferncroft Road.

== Hiking trails in the Ferncroft area ==
- Blueberry Ledge Trail – Mt. Whiteface
- Rollins Trail – Mt. Whiteface & Mt. Passaconaway
- Tom Wiggin Trail – Mt. Whiteface
- Dicey Mill Trail – Mt Passaconaway
- Wonalancet Range Trail – Mt. Wonalancet & Mt Passaconaway
- McCrillis Path – Whiteface Intervale Rd.
- Mt. Katherine Trail – Mt. Katherine
- Gordon Path
- Kelly Trail – Carrigain Col (between Mt. Passaconaway and Mt. Paugus)
- Old Mast Rd. Trail – Carrigain Col
- Walden Trail – Mt. Passaconaway & Mt. Paugus

Many other trails begin in nearby Whiteface village, Wonalancet and Fowler's Mill, leading to other peaks such as Mount Chocorua, Sandwich Dome and Mount Tripyramid.
