= Wonalancet River =

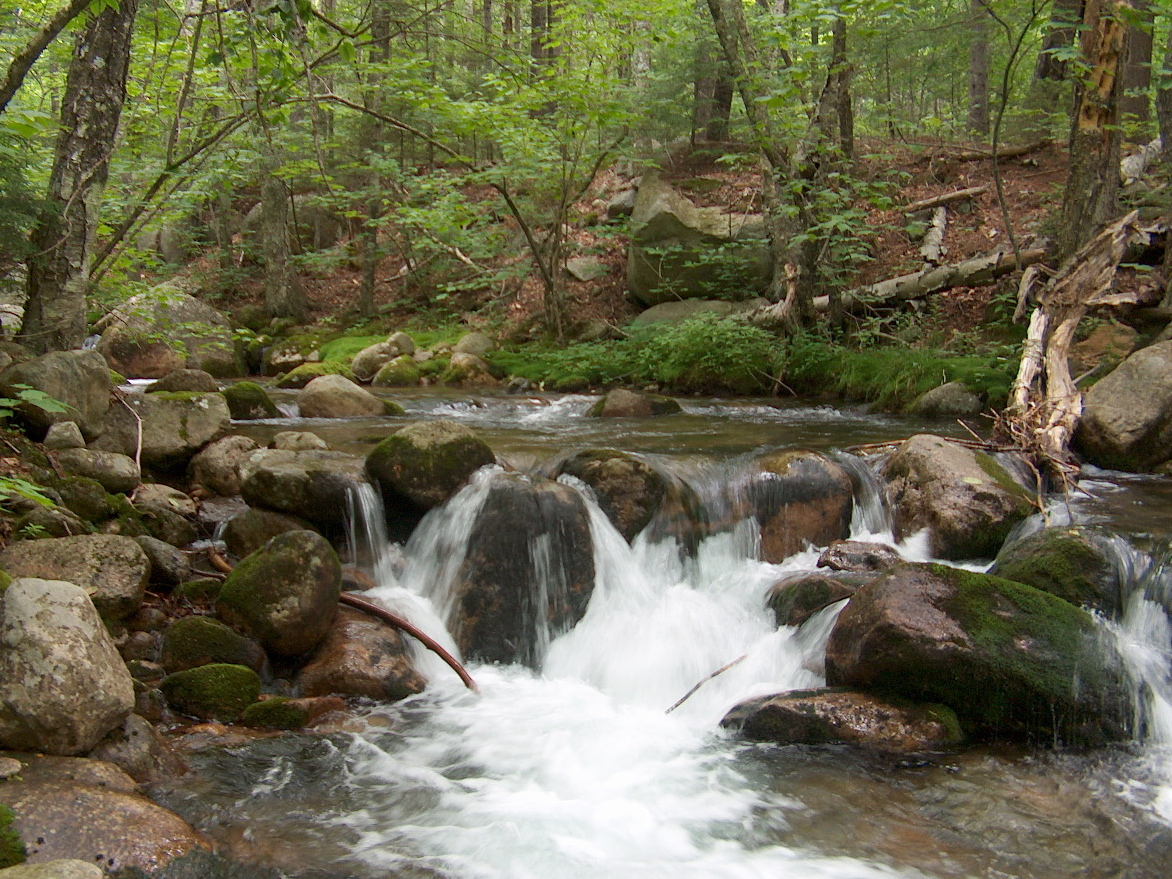
- The Wonalancet River near its source in the Sandwich Range

- Location within New Hampshire Location within the United States

Location
- Country: United States
- State: New Hampshire
- Counties: Grafton, Carroll
- Towns: Waterville Valley, Sandwich, Albany, Tamworth

Physical characteristics
- Source: Sandwich Range
  - location: White Mountain National Forest
  - coordinates: 42°56′34″N 71°23′38″W
  - elevation: 2,320 ft (710 m)
- Mouth: Swift River
  - location: Tamworth
  - coordinates: 43°53′39″N 71°17′47″W
  - elevation: 740 ft (230 m)
- Length: 7.6 mi (12.2 km)

Basin features
- Tributaries
  - left: Spring Brook
  - right: Sanborn Brook

The Wonalancet River is a 7.6-mile-long (12.2 km) river in the White Mountains of New Hampshire in the United States. Named after the 17th-century Pennacook sachem Wonalancet, it is a tributary of the southern Swift River, part of the Bearcamp River / Ossipee Lake / Saco River watershed leading to the Atlantic Ocean.

The Wonalancet River rises in the heart of the Sandwich Range, in "The Bowl", a forested glacial cirque lying between Mount Whiteface to the west, Mount Passaconaway to the north, and Mount Wonalancet to the east. The river flows south, paralleled by the Dicey Mill Trail, out of the mountains into the communities of Ferncroft, in the southwest corner of the town of Albany, and Wonalancet, in the northwest corner of the town of Tamworth. The river continues east into a forested valley and joins the Swift River 3 miles (5 km) northwest of Tamworth village.

== See also ==
- List of rivers of New Hampshire
