= The Sleepers (New Hampshire) =

Two mountain peaks in the United States of America

East Sleeper
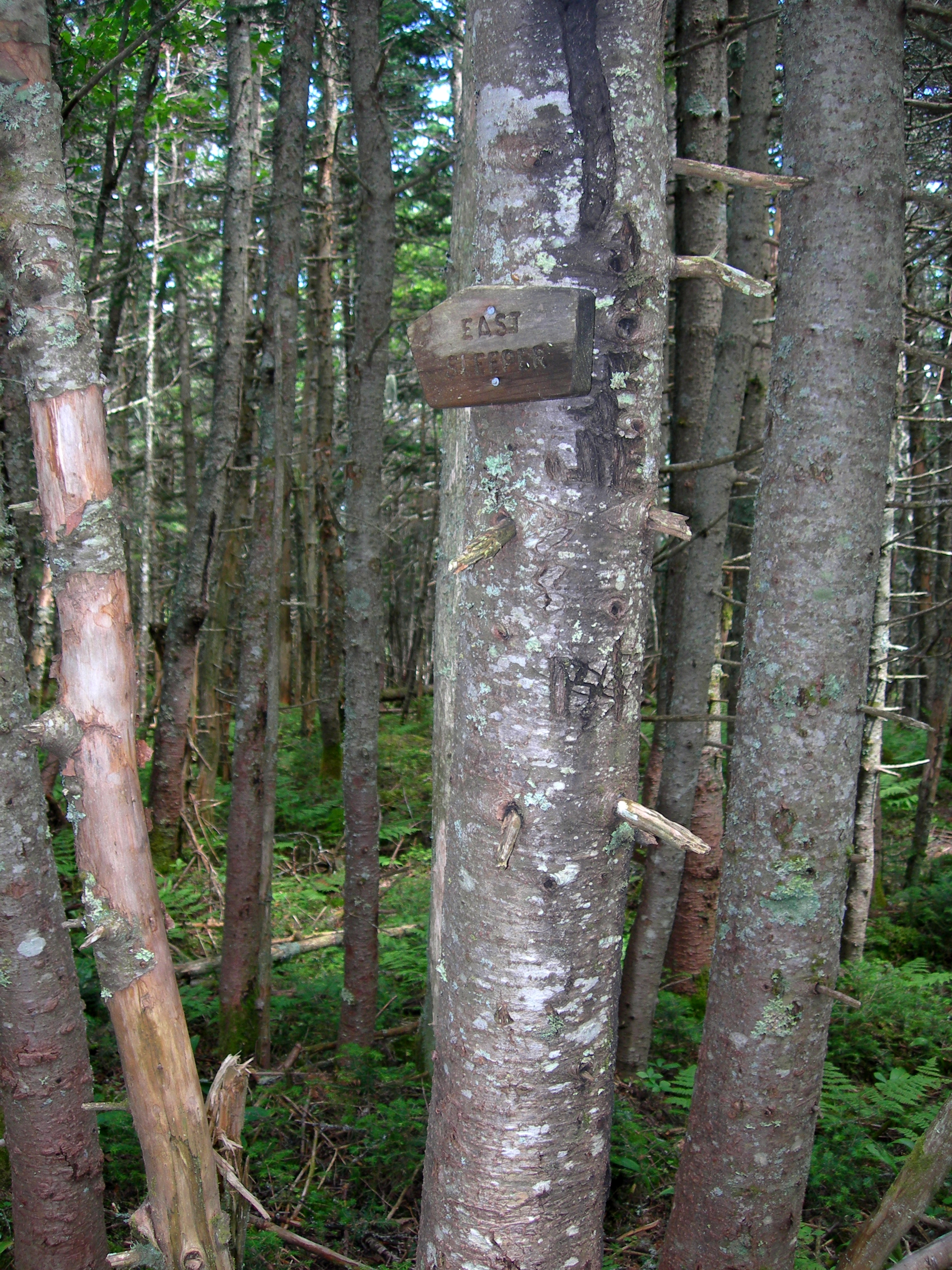
- Summit sign on East Sleeper

Highest point
- Elevation: 3,855 ft (1,175 m)
- Prominence: 344 ft (105 m)
- Listing: #86 New England 100 Highest
- Coordinates: 43°56′47″N 71°25′32″W

Geography

Climbing
- Easiest route: unofficial path

West Sleeper
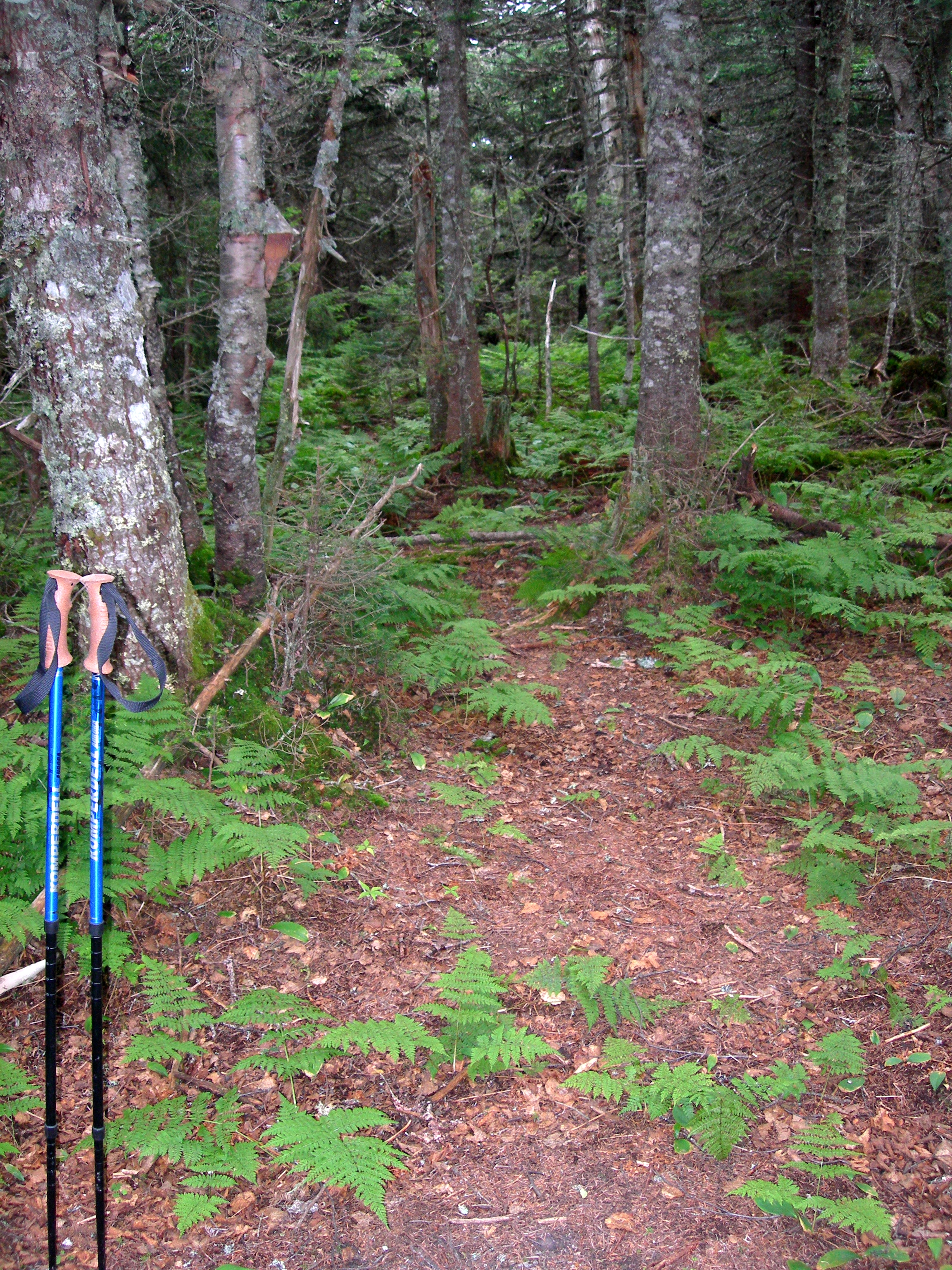
- Summit of West Sleeper

Highest point
- Elevation: 3,881 ft (1,183 m)
- Prominence: 180 ft (55 m)
- Coordinates: 43°57′16″N 71°26′07″W

Geography
- Location: Grafton County, New Hampshire
- Parent range: Sandwich Range
- Topo map: USGS Mount Tripyramid

Climbing
- Easiest route: bushwhack

The Sleepers are two mountain peaks, East Sleeper 3,855 ft (1,175 m) and West Sleeper 3,881 ft (1,183 m), located within the Sandwich Range Wilderness in Grafton County, New Hampshire. Part of the Sandwich Range of the White Mountains, they are flanked to the northwest by Mount Tripyramid, to the northeast by Mount Passaconaway, and to the southeast by Mount Whiteface. The Kate Sleeper Trail passes close by both peaks.

== Drainage ==
The southwest side of the Sleepers drains into Slide Brook and Cascade Brook, both of which drain into Avalanche Brook, thence into the Mad River, Pemigewasset River, Merrimack River, and into the Gulf of Maine at Newburyport, Massachusetts. The northeast side of the Sleepers drains into Sabbaday Brook and Downes Brook, which both drain into the Swift River, thence into the Saco River, and into the Gulf of Maine at Saco, Maine. The south end of East Sleeper drains into the Whiteface River, thence into the Cold River, Bearcamp River, Ossipee River, and the Saco River.

== Hundred Highest ==
East Sleeper is on the Appalachian Mountain Club's list of the "Hundred Highest" peaks in New England. West Sleeper is actually higher, but the ridge connecting it to the peaks of Mount Tripyramid is high enough to deny it the 200 feet (61 m) of topographic prominence to qualify for the list. A maintained trail passes close by the summit, from which an obvious spur path leads to the top.

== Kate Sleeper ==
The peaks are named in honor of Katherine "Kate" Sleeper (1862–1949), a local innkeeper who was heavily involved in trail development in the area:

Kate Sleeper Walden, born in 1862. In 1890, as a single woman, she purchased the old Caleb Brown farm, which she renovated and then opened to the public as the Wonalancet Farm in 1892 to immediate success. Married Arthur Walden. Initiated the Wonalancet Chapel restoration, the forming of the Wonalancet Out Door Club, the introduction of the telephone to the area, served as the first postmaster of the Wonalancet Post Office. Advocated the preservation of great tracts of land that became part of the White Mountain National Forest. She died in 1949.

There is more on Sleeper in the book on the White Mountains "Forest and Crag" by Laura and Guy Waterman.

== See also ==
- Katherine Sleeper Walden
- List of mountains in New Hampshire
- White Mountain National Forest

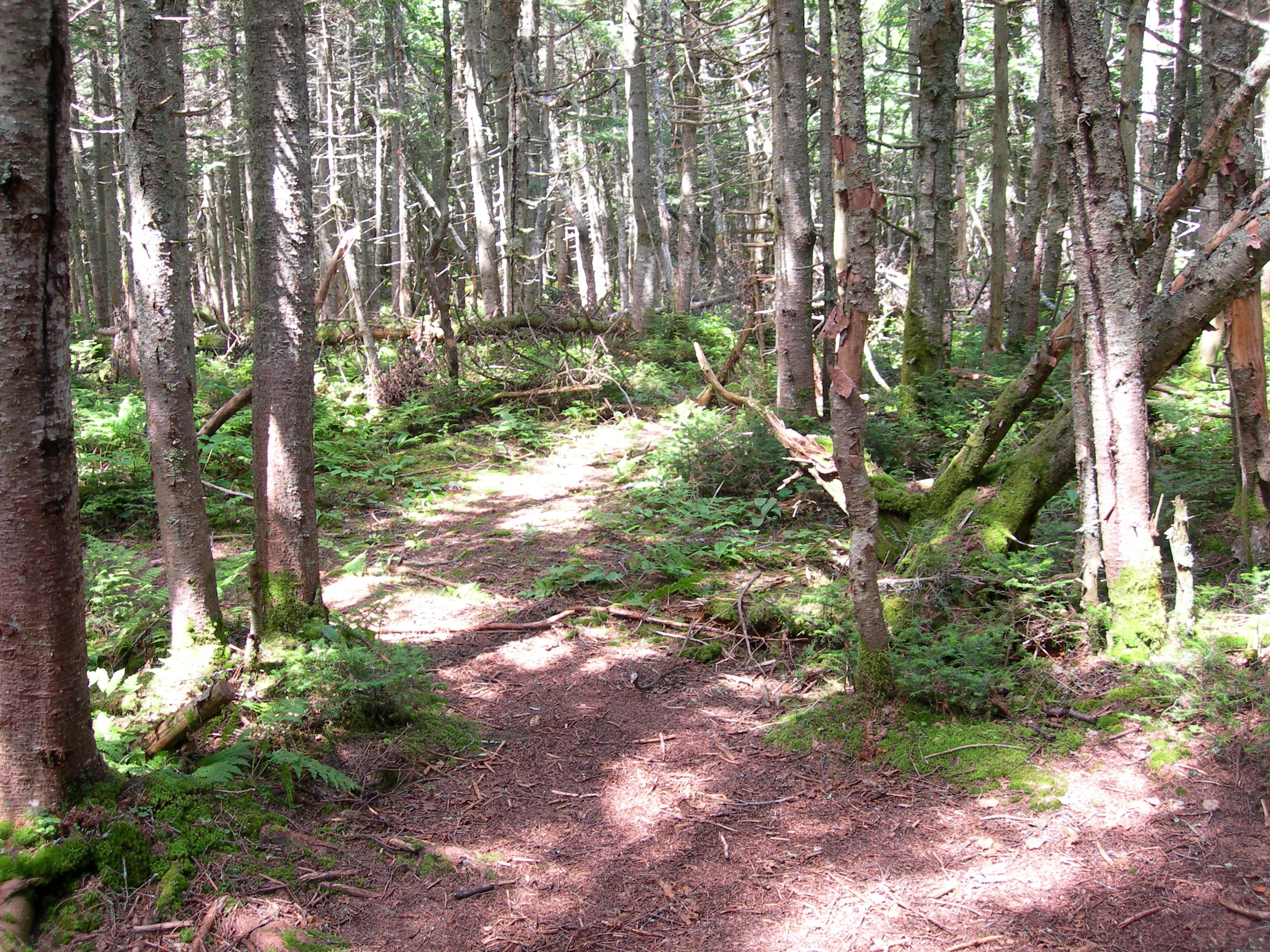
Summit area and unofficial path on East Sleeper
