= Wonalancet =

Wonalancet, or variant spellings, may refer to:

- Wonalancet (sachem), a 17th-century Native American chief of the Penacook people
- Wonalancet, New Hampshire, a community in the United States
- Wonalancet River, in New Hampshire, US
- Mount Wonalancet, in New Hampshire, US
- USS Wanaloset (1865), a cancelled Contoocook-class sloop
- USS Wannalancet, a United States Navy harbor tug 1944–1946

== See also ==
- Wannalancit Mills, in Lowell, Massachusetts, US
- Wannalancit Street Historic District, in Lowell, Massachusetts, US
