= East Branch Whiteface River =

- The East Branch

- Location within New Hampshire Location within the United States

Location
- Country: United States
- State: New Hampshire
- Counties: Grafton, Carroll
- Towns: Waterville Valley, Sandwich

Physical characteristics
- Source: Mount Whiteface
  - location: White Mountain National Forest
  - coordinates: 43°55′45″N 71°24′54″W
  - elevation: 2,840 ft (870 m)
- Mouth: Whiteface River
  - location: Sandwich
  - coordinates: 43°54′16″N 71°24′53″W
  - elevation: 1,300 ft (400 m)
- Length: 1.9 mi (3.1 km)

The East Branch of the Whiteface River is a 1.9-mile-long (3.1 km) stream in the White Mountains of New Hampshire in the United States. It is a tributary of the Whiteface River, part of the Saco River watershed.

The East Branch, never larger than a brook, drains the southwestern slopes of Mount Whiteface, a 4,020-foot-high (1,230 m) summit in the Sandwich Range of the White Mountains. The stream begins within the town limits of Waterville Valley and flows south into Sandwich, where it joins the Whiteface River.

== See also ==
- List of rivers of New Hampshire
