= Defunct placenames of New Hampshire =

Defunct placenames are those no longer used officially.

Many populated places in the U.S. state of New Hampshire once prospered and are now gone, subsumed by adjacent cities or renamed. Similarly, many geophysical features have had their names changed over time. This is an alphabetized list of the names of such places that once appeared on the maps, along with references to their present names, if any. Although no longer officially recognized, some of these may yet have local significance.

- Adams: Original 1800 name of Jackson until 1829.
- Ammortoosack: Early alternative spelling for Ammonoosuc.
- Amoriscoggan River: Early alternate spelling for Androscoggin River.
- Appleton Island: Early name of Star Island, also called Gosport.
- Arlington: Now Winchester, then part of Massachusetts.
- Atworth: Early alternative spelling of Acworth.
- Barker's Location: Triangular portion now of Lancaster north of Jefferson bounded to east by Kilkenny.
- Bellows Town: Also Great Falls, now Walpole.
- Berlin Falls: Portion of Berlin east of Androscoggin River (1893 topo).
- Blake's Pond: Now Mirror Lake in Whitefield, then known as Whitefields
- Bloody Point: Portion of Dover (and scene of early settler boundary disputes), which became Newington in 1764
- Boyle: Original name of Gilsum (in 1752) before being re-granted in 1763
- Bretton Woods or Britton Woods: Original 1772 name of Carroll, also shown as Breton Woods. See also: Bretton Woods, now an area of Carroll.
- Briton's Farm: Early name of Litchfield also Natticutt.
- Burton: Early name of Albany until 1833. Included present town of Madison.
- Camden: 1768 name of Washington, prior to 1776.
- Campbell's Gore: Until 1798, now Windsor.
- Cardigan: 1769 name of Orange.
- Carlisle (also Carlisle No. 1): Now SE portion of Pittsburg, east of Connecticut River, included portion of earlier Clarksville.
- Charmingfare: The 1748 name of Candia, part of Chester until 1763.
- Chester: Early name of Bristol, also part of Bridgewater.
- Chiswick: Early (1764) name of Apthorp, which split in 1784 to become Littleton and Dalton. Also shown as Cheswick.
- Cochecho: Early name of Dover, specifically its mill town district.
- Cockburne: 1770 name of Columbia until 1811.
- Cockermouth Grant: Early name of portion of present Hebron that was not part of Plymouth, which became Groton
- Colebrook Academy Grant: Now part of Pittsburg between Indian Stream and Halls Stream, approximately 15 sq. mi, shown on 1854 and 1892 maps.
- Coleburne: Early name of Colebrook until 1795.
- Concord: 1763 name of Gunthwaite (1768), now Lisbon, included Sugar Hill and Streeter Pond.
- Contoocook: Early name of Boscawen until 1760.
- Coventry: 1764 name of Benton, until 1840.
- Dantzic (or Dantzick): Early name of Newbury until renamed Fishersfield in 1778 until renamed in 1837; also part of New London.
- Dartmouth: 1765 name for Jefferson until 1796.
- Derryfield: Name under which Manchester was incorporated in 1757, including a part called Harrytown, until the name changed in 1810.
- Dresden: Early name of Hanover Plains, portion of Hanover.
- Dryden: Early name of Colebrook before it was re-granted in 1770.
- Dunstable: Early name for Nashua in 1733 until 1837.
- Durand: An early name for the town of Randolph until 1824.
- Duxbury School Farm: Portion of early Milford.
- East Town: Now Wakefield.
- Fairfield: 1804 name of Woodstock, also Peeling. May have included Benton.
- Fifteen Mile Falls: Portion of Connecticut River from mouth of Passumpsic River in Monroe to Johns River in Dalton, now forming several reservoirs behind hydro-electric dams.
- First Grant to Dartmouth College: Now part of Clarksville.
- Fishersfield: Early name of Newbury, also called Dantzic. Incorporated in 1778. Moved from Hillsborough County to Merrimack County in 1823.
- Fort Dummer: Early name of Hinsdale. Also shown as Hensdale.
- Fort Wentworth: Early name of Groveton. Also shown as Stonington.
- Frank Mountain: Early name of Cannon Mountain in Franconia.
- Freetown: 1762 name for Raymond until 1764, part of Chester.
- Gerrish: Early name of Boscawen.
- Gillis and Foss Grant: Early name of Waterville Valley, also known historically as Waterville.
- Gonic Village: Portion of early Rochester, short for Squamanogonic.
- Gosport: Early name of village on Star Island in the Isles of Shoals, also called Appleton Island.
- Gunthwaite: Early name of Lisbon until 1824.
- Great Bay: Early name of Lake Winnisquam.
- Great Falls: Early name of Somersworth, specifically its mill town district.
- Great Falls: Now Walpole, also Bellows Town.
- Great Haystack Mountain: Now called Mount Lafayette.
- Great Island: Early name of New Castle until 1693.
- Great Meadow (or Great Meadows): Now Westmoreland, Number Two (Massachusetts).
- Halestown: 1740 name of Weare.
- Hawke: Original name of Danville, when it was split off from Kingston in 1760, changed in 1836.
- Hilton's Purchase: Also known as part of Swampscott Patent, now Stratham.
- Hubbard (also Hubbards No. 3): Now SE portion of Pittsburg, north of Webster No. 2 and east of Connecticut River.
- Hurd's Location: 1769 name of what is now Monroe.
- Indian Stream: Temporarily independent republic annexed and incorporated as Pittsburg in 1840.
- Ipswich Canada: 1749 name of New Ipswich until 1762.
- Island Pond: Now Hazens Pond, in Whitefield (1892 map).
- Johnson: Extinct logging town, in Lincoln near Indian Head (Mount Pemigewasset) in lower Franconia Notch.
- Kearsarge: The 1775 name of Wilmot.
- Kohafser: Early name of area near Lancaster.
- Kusumpe Pond: Early name of Squam Lake.
- Lane's New-Boston: 1736 name of New Boston until 1763.
- Leavitt's Town: Early name of Effingham.
- Lime: Early spelling of Lyme.
- Limerick: Now Stoddard.
- Lloyd Hills: 1774 name of Bethlehem. Also shown as simply Lloyd.. Shown as Bethlehem by 1817.
- Long Bay: Now known as Paugus Bay in Laconia.
- Long Pond: Now known as Forest Lake in Whitefield.
- Long Meadows: Part of Chester until separately incorporated in 1845.
- Lower Ashuelot: 1733 name of Swanzey until 1753 grant by New Hampshire.
- Lower Cohos: Original name of Haverhill.
- Margallaway River: Historical name of Magalloway River.
- Maynesborough (or Maynesborough Plantation): Name of Berlin until 1829. Also shown as Mainsburg.
- Middle Monadnock: Early name of Jaffrey, also known as Number Two.
- Mile Slip: Early name of portion of Milford.
- Monadnock No. 1: Name of Rindge until 1768, also known as Rowley Canada.
- Monadnock No. 3: 1749 name of Dublin.
- Monadnock No. 4: 1760 name of Fitzwilliam.
- Monadnock No. 5: Early name of Marlborough from 1754.
- Monadnock No. 6: Early name of Nelson before it was renamed Packersfield in 1774, and then Nelson in 1814.
- Monson: Defunct town on what is now the border of Hollis and Milford.
- Mooselock Mountain: Early alternate of Moosilauke.
- Morristown: 1764 name of Franconia.
- Moultonborough Addition: Portion of Moultonborough Gore that became New Hampton in 1763.
- Narragansett Number Five: See Souhegan East, now Bedford.
- Narragansett Number Three: Amherst, also known as Souhegan West.
- Nash & Sawyer Location: Portion of Crawford Notch annexed to Carroll.
- Nashville: Northern portion of present-day Nashua, divided off in 1842.
- Natticutt: Early name of Litchfield, also Briton's Farm.
- New Amesbury: Now Warner, also called Number One in 1735.
- New Boston Addition: 1760 name of Francestown.
- New Chester: Early name of Hill until 1837.
- New Garden: Early name of Ossipee.
- New Grantham: Temporary name (1786 to 1818) of Grantham.
- New Durham Gore: Alton.
- New Holderness: Early name for what is now Ashland.
- New Hopkinton: Early name of Hopkinton.
- New-Salem: Early name of Meredith. Included Laconia.
- New Stratford: Early name of North Stratford. Also shown as Woodbury.
- Newtown: Name of Alstead in 1763.
- Nisitisset: Early name of Hollis, later becoming West Parish of Dunstable, Massachusetts.
- North Effingham: Early name of Freedom including part of Ossipee Gore.
- Northam: Early name of Dover.
- North Hill: Parish of Hampton, which became North Hampton in 1742.
- North Whiteface: renamed Mount Passaconaway in the 1870s.
- Norway Plains: Portion of early Rochester forming the principal village.
- Notch Mountain: Now called Mount Webster.
- Nottingham West: Part of early Hudson and Nashua, east of the Merrimack and west of Pelham.
- Number One: Original name of Mason. Also the name of Warner in 1735, later New Amesbury. Also 1752 name of Chesterfield.
- Number Two: 1741 name of Jaffrey, also called Middle Monadnock. Also name of Westmoreland, then part of Massachusetts, later called Great Meadow.
- Number Four: Granted in 1735, now called Charlestown.
- Number Five: 1735 name of Hopkinton, which later became New Hopkinton.
- Number Six: Early name of Henniker.
- Number Seven: Early name of Hillsborough.
- Number Eleven: Early name of grant for Lyman, including Monroe.
- Nutfield: Original name of Londonderry from 1718 to 1722. At the time, Nutfield was the second largest town in colonial New Hampshire, and present-day Londonderry, as well as Derry, Windham, and portions of Manchester were formed from it.
- Ossipee Gore: Portion of Ossipee taken to form Freedom, north and east of Ossipee Lake.
- Oyster River: Early name of Durham until 1716, before which it was part of Dover.
- Packersfield: Name of Nelson until 1814.
- Passaconaway: A small village in the Albany Intervale of Albany, shown on maps at least until 1958.
- Pattenville: In north Littleton. One of several villages inundated by the Moore Reservoir when the Moore Dam was built in 1956. Had bridge to old Waterford, Vermont, another hamlet now under water.
- Paulsburg: 1771 name of Milan until 1824 (although both shown on map of 1817.
- Peeling: 1763 name of Woodstock, then Fairfield until 1804. Shown as Peeling on 1817 map.
- Penney Cook: Name of early settlement of Concord until it became Rumford in 1733, as a part of Massachusetts. See also: Pennacook (tribe).
- Perrystown: 1749 name of Sutton.
- Peterborough Slip: Now Sharon, except for the easterly portion, which became Temple.
- Picked Mountain or Peaked Hill: Now Mount Agassiz in Bethlehem.
- Piercey: Original name, in 1795, for Stark. Also shown as Percy, which survives in NE corner of Stark today.
- Pine Mountain: A summit, now called Currier Mountain, in the Dartmouth Range once having a fire lookout tower; located northwest of Mount Dartmouth; not to be confused with the Pine Mountain northeast of Mount Madison.
- Piscataqua: Early name of Portsmouth.
- Pliny Major and Pliny Minor: Two peaks of the Pilot Range now known as Mount Waumbek (with Mount Starr King) and Pliny Mountain. Also shown as Mt. Plinny.
- Pondicherry Pond: Early name of Cherry Pond. Also Pondicherry Mountain became Cherry Mountain, part of Mount Martha.
- Poplin: Early name of Fremont when it was taken from Brentwood portion of Exeter, until 1854.
- Roby: The 1769 name of Brookline, changed by legislative act in 1778.
- Rowley Canada: An early name of Rindge, Monadnock No. 1.
- Rumford: Early name of Concord, formerly a part of Bow, until 1765.
- Salem Canada: Early name of Lyndeborough until 1753.
- Salmon Falls, Early name of Rollinsford, specifically its mill town district. (See also Sligo, below)
- Sanborn: 1748 name of Sanbornton. Also shown as Sandbornton.
- Sanbornton Bridge: Part of Sanbornton disannexed and later called Tilton.
- Sandy Beach: Early name of Rye when it was a part of New Castle.
- Sandwich Addition: Portion of Sandwich added in 1764.
- Seville: 1768 name of Sunapee, first incorporated as Wendell in 1781. Also shown as Saville.
- Shelburne Addition: Early name of Gorham until 1836.
- Sligo: Early name of Rollinsford when a part of Dover. (See also Salmon Falls, above)
- Smith's Isles: Early name for the Isles of Shoals.
- South Newmarket: Portion of Newmarket separated in 1849, also called Newfield Village in 1621, now known as Newfields.
- Souhegan East: Early name of Bedford, also known as Narragansett Number Five.
- Souhegan West: 1733 name of Amherst, also known as Narragansett Number Three.
- Squam Falls: Early name of Ashland.
- Stark's Town: 1751 name of Dunbarton until 1765.
- Stevenstown: 1749 name of Salisbury until 1768.
- Stewart: Now Stewartstown, since 1799. Also shown as Stuarttown.
- Stonington: Early name of Groveton. Also called Fort Wentworth.
- Strawberry Bank: Early name of Portsmouth until 1653. The name is preserved in the Strawbery Banke museum area.
- Summersworth: Early name for both Rollinsford and Somersworth when they were a single parish of Dover.
- Suncook: Early name of Pembroke in 1727, now a Census-designated place.
- Swampscott Patent: Also known as part of Hilton’s Purchase, now Stratham.
- Trecothick: 1769 name of Ellsworth until it was incorporated in 1802.
- Tulford: Early name for western end of New Hampton.
- Upper Ashuelot: Early name of Keene until 1753.
- Upper Belmont: 1859 name of Belmont after separation from Gilmanton.
- Upper Coos: Early name of environs later incorporated as "Lancaster".
- Warren's Ferry: Route between Pattenville (now under water in north Littleton to Waterford, Vermont.
- Waterville: Early name of Waterville Valley, formerly Gillis and Foss Grant.
- Webster (also Websters No. 2): Now eastern portion of Pittsburg, north of Carlisle, east of Connecticut River. Not same as present-day Webster.
- Wendell: Early name of Sunapee, also known as Seville until 1781.
- West Lyman: Now Monroe.
- Whipples Dale: Portion of Jefferson SE of Whipples Mills (now Riverton).
- Whitefield Landing Field: Now Mount Washington Regional Airport, in Whitefield.
- Windslow's Location: Early eastern end of Stark, New Hampshire, with western edge just east of South Pond, then known as Percy Pond.
- Willard's Mountain: Early name of Mount Waumbek.
- Winnacunnet: 1639 name of Hampton.
- Winnipisiogee: Early spelling of Winnipesaukee, as in Winnipesaukee River and Lake. Also shown as Winipisseokket Pond.
- Woodbury: Early name of North Stratford.

== See also ==
- Category:Fictional populated places in New Hampshire
- List of ghost towns in New Hampshire
- List of New Hampshire places
