= Whiteface River (New Hampshire) =

River in United States of America

- The river along the Flat Mountain Pond Trail

- Location within New Hampshire Location within the United States

Location
- Country: United States
- State: New Hampshire
- Counties: Grafton, Carroll
- Towns: Waterville Valley, Sandwich

Physical characteristics
- Source: Mount Whiteface
  - location: White Mountain National Forest
  - coordinates: 43°55′57″N 71°25′50″W
  - elevation: 2,700 ft (820 m)
- Mouth: Cold River
  - location: Sandwich (Whiteface)
  - coordinates: 43°51′49″N 71°23′19″W
  - elevation: 670 ft (200 m)
- Length: 5.9 mi (9.5 km)

Basin features
- Tributaries
  - left: East Branch, White Brook

The Whiteface River is a 5.9-mile-long (9.5 km) river rising in the White Mountains of New Hampshire in the United States. Its waters flow by way of the Cold River, Bearcamp River, Ossipee Lake, the Ossipee River and the Saco River into the Gulf of Maine, an arm of the Atlantic Ocean.

The Whiteface River, sharing a name with the 4,020-foot-high (1,230 m) Mount Whiteface, rises on the southern slopes of the Sandwich Range in the town of Waterville Valley. The headwaters collect tributaries from the area between Mt. Whiteface and Flat Mountain, as well as from The Sleepers, some broad peaks extending north towards Mount Tripyramid. Flowing south, the river enters the town of Sandwich and the Whiteface Intervale, a broad, flat valley at the base of the Sandwich Range. In the river's last mile, it leaves the Intervale and drops 200 feet (60 m) to end at the Cold River, just east of the village of Whiteface.

== See also ==
- List of rivers of New Hampshire
