= Sandwich Mountain =

Mountain in New Hampshire, United States

Sandwich Dome
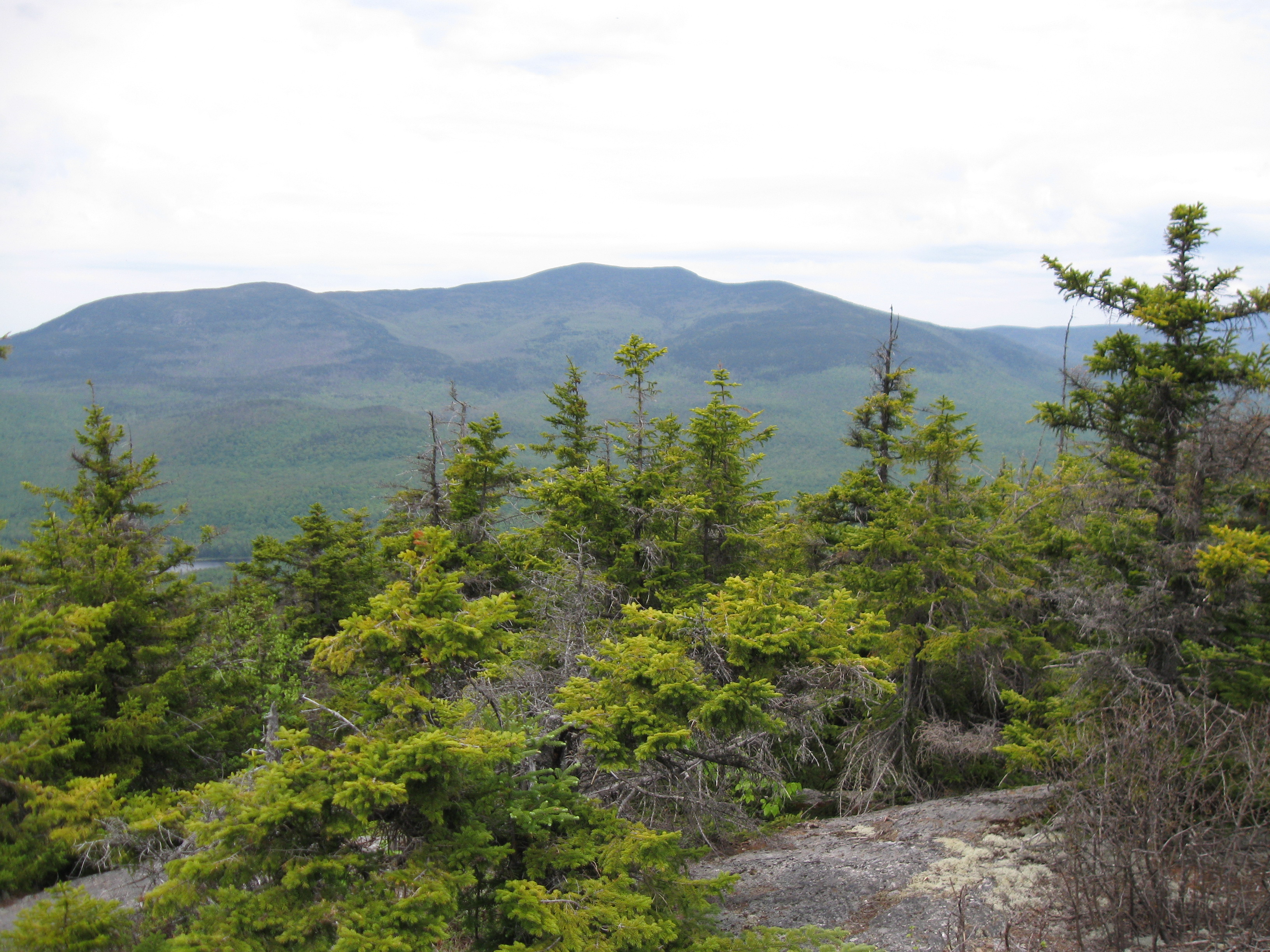
- View from Mount Israel

Highest point
- Elevation: 3,983 ft (1,214 m)
- Prominence: 1,200 ft (370 m)
- Listing: #68 New England 100 Highest
- Coordinates: 43°54.02′N 71°29.89′W

Geography
- Location: Carroll / Grafton counties, New Hampshire, U.S.
- Parent range: Sandwich Range
- Topo map: USGS Mount Tripyramid

Climbing
- Easiest route: maintained hiking trail

Sandwich Mountain (or Sandwich Dome) is a 3,983 ft (1,214 m) mountain located on the border between Carroll and Grafton counties, New Hampshire spanning parts of the towns of Sandwich and Waterville Valley, respectively. The mountain is part of the Sandwich Range of the White Mountains.

Sandwich Mountain is flanked to the northeast by Mount Tripyramid, and to the southwest by Mount Weetamoo across Sandwich Notch. Several maintained hiking trails pass over the summit.

The north side of Sandwich Mountain drains into Drakes Brook, thence into the Mad River, Pemigewasset River, Merrimack River, and thence into the Gulf of Maine at Newburyport, Massachusetts. The west side of Sandwich Mountain drains into Smarts Brook, thence into the Mad River. The southwest flank of Sandwich Mountain drains into the Beebe River, thence into the Pemigewasset River. The south side of Sandwich Mountain drains into the Cold River, Bearcamp River, Ossipee River, and the Saco River, which reaches the Gulf of Maine at Saco, Maine. The east side of Sandwich Mountain drains into Pond Brook, thence into the Cold River.

== See also ==
- List of mountains in New Hampshire
- White Mountain National Forest
