= Mill Brook (Swift River tributary) =

Stream in New Hampshire, USA

- Location within New Hampshire Location within the United States

Location
- Country: United States
- State: New Hampshire
- County: Carroll
- Towns: Sandwich, Tamworth

Physical characteristics
- Source
  - location: White Mountain National Forest
  - coordinates: 43°54′15″N 71°23′28″W
  - elevation: 1,560 ft (480 m)
- Mouth: Swift River
  - location: Tamworth
  - coordinates: 43°50′4″N 71°14′53″W
  - elevation: 438 ft (134 m)
- Length: 10.7 mi (17.2 km)

Basin features
- Tributaries
  - right: Hoag Brook

Mill Brook is a 10.7-mile-long (17.2 km) stream in the White Mountains of New Hampshire in the United States. It is a tributary of the southern Swift River, part of the Bearcamp River / Ossipee Lake / Saco River watershed leading to the Atlantic Ocean.

Mill Brook rises on the southern slopes of Mount Whiteface in the town of Sandwich and flows southeast into Tamworth. The brook reaches the Swift River just east of the village of Whittier.

== See also ==
- List of rivers of New Hampshire
