= Whiteface River =

Whiteface River may refer to a waterway in the United States:

- Whiteface River (Minnesota)
- Whiteface River (New Hampshire)
