= Russell-Colbath House =

Historic house in New Hampshire, United States

- Russell/Colbath House
- U.S. National Register of Historic Places
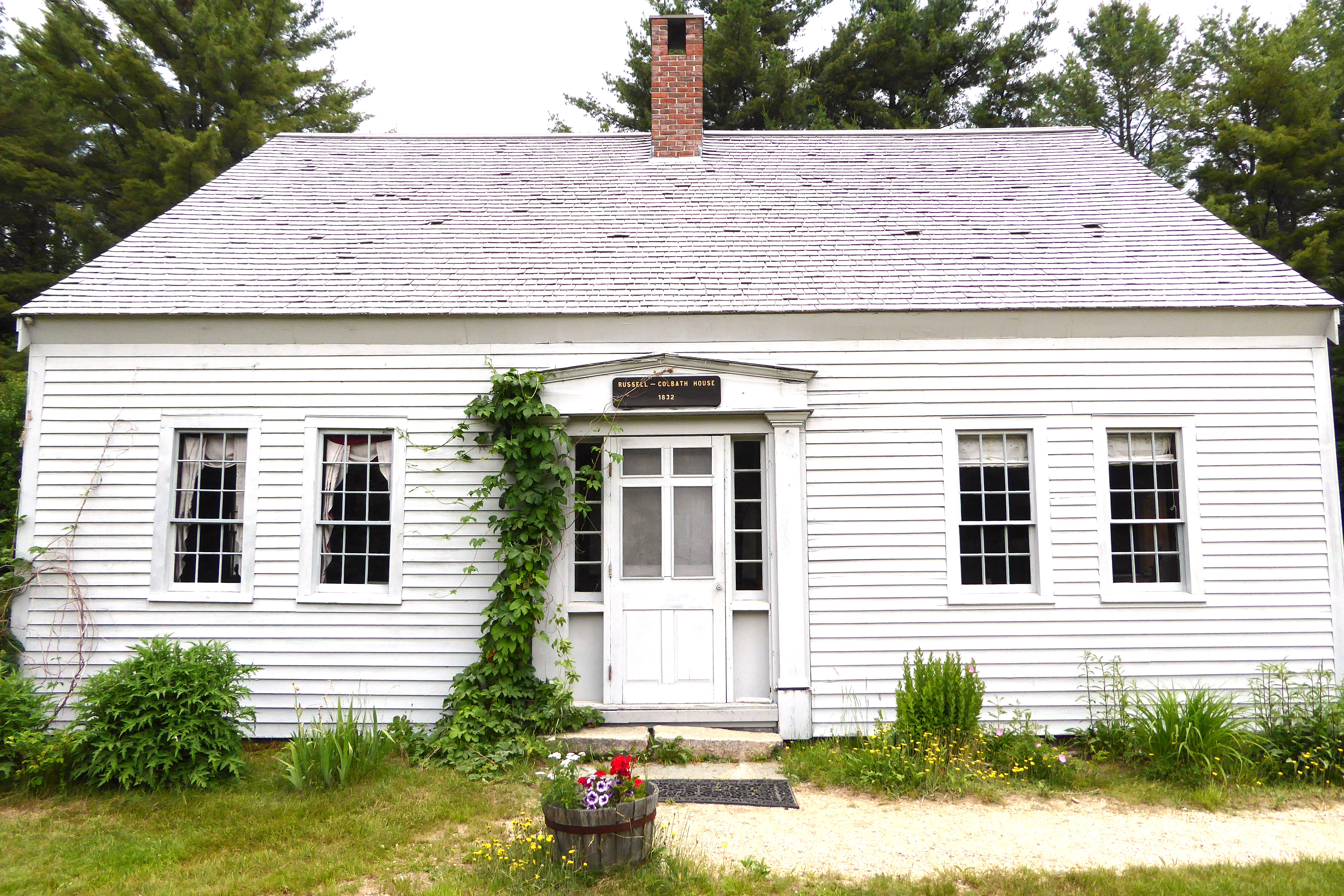

- Location within New Hampshire Location within the United States
- Location: Kancamagus Hwy., White Mountain National Forest, Albany, New Hampshire
- Coordinates: 43°59′47″N 71°20′25″W
- Area: 1 acre (0.40 ha)
- Built: 1831
- Built by: Russell, Amzi; Russell, Thomas
- NRHP reference No.: 86003416
- Added to NRHP: April 23, 1987

The Russell/Colbath House is a historic house on the Kancamagus Highway in Albany, New Hampshire. It is located in the White Mountain National Forest, and is operated as a museum by the United States Forest Service. Built about 1831, it is the only surviving early homestead in the Swift River valley. It was listed on the National Register of Historic Places in 1987.

== Description and history ==
The Russell-Colbath House stands on the north side of the Kancamagus Highway, between the Jigger Johnson Campground and Oliverian Brook Road. It is a 1 1/2-story wood-frame structure, with a gable roof, central chimney, and clapboarded exterior. It has a symmetrical five-bay facade, with a center entrance flanked by sidelight windows and pilasters, and topped by a simple peaked entablature. The interior follows a center-chimney plan, with a small entrance vestibule, parlor spaces flanking the chimney, and a bedroom behind the chimney. A narrow space in the northeast corner includes both a kitchen space and stairs to bedrooms in the upper level.

The house was built in 1831-32 by Thomas and Amzi Russell, and is the only surviving 19th-century homestead in the Swift River valley. The Russells were among the early permanent settlers, arriving in the 1820s (failed settlements took place in 1805 and 1815). The Russells operated a sawmill on Oliverian Brook, and were part of a small farming and logging community in the immediate area, which constituted the best farmland in the valley. The house was owned by Russell descendants until 1930, after which it was used for a time as a summer residence. It was acquired by the Forest Service in 1961, which uses it as a museum and information center.

== See also ==
- National Register of Historic Places listings in Carroll County, New Hampshire
