= Mount Wonalancet =

Mountain in New Hampshire, United States

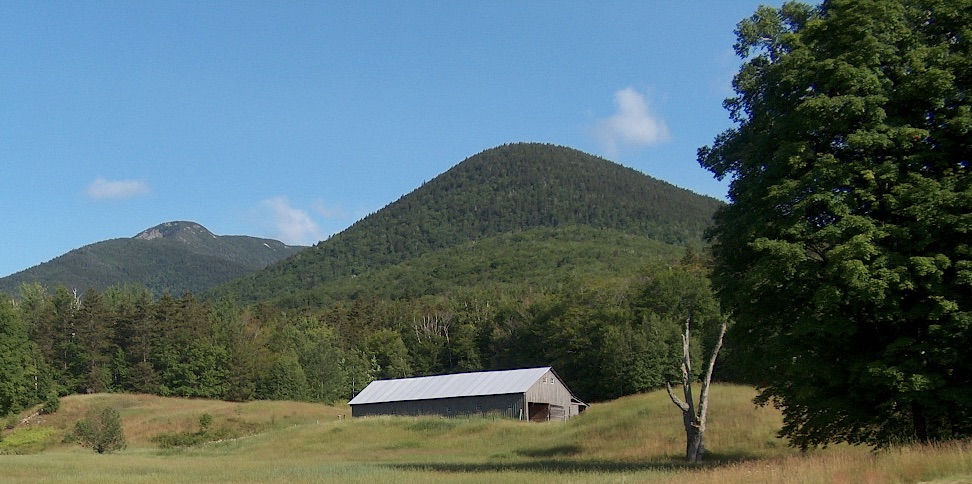
- Mt. Wonalancet as seen from Ferncroft. Mount Whiteface is to the left.

Highest point
- Elevation: 2,760 ft (840 m)
- Prominence: 160 ft (49 m)
- Coordinates: 43°55′38″N 71°22′36″W

Geography
- Location: Grafton County, New Hampshire, U.S.
- Parent range: Sandwich Range, White Mountains
- Topo map: USGS Mount Tripyramid O43071h4 1:24,000

Mount Wonalancet is a 2,760 ft (840 m) mountain in the town of Waterville Valley, New Hampshire, overlooking the unincorporated communities of Wonalancet and Ferncroft. It is named after Wonalancet, a 17th-century sachem of the Pennacook, a Native American people. Mount Wonalancet lies in Grafton County, immediately west of the Carroll County border, the county in which Ferncroft and Wonalancet are located.

To its immediate north and sharing the same massif is Hibbard Mountain. The pair lie between popular Mount Chocorua to the east, 4,000-foot (1,200 m) Mount Passaconaway to the north, and Mount Whiteface to the west. Along with Mount Paugus, due east, the group makes up the easternmost mountains of the Sandwich Range, the southernmost of the White Mountains. To the south, the Sandwich Range is bordered by the Ossipee Mountains immediately north of Lake Winnipesaukee.

The most popular access is via the Mast Trail out of the Ferncroft parking area.

== See also ==
- List of mountains of New Hampshire
