= Mount Whiteface =

Mountain in the American state of New Hampshire

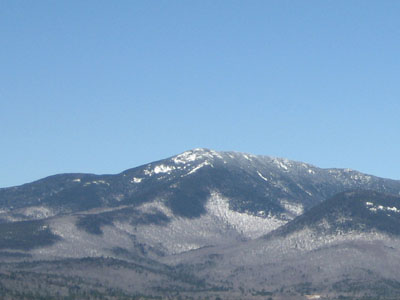

Highest point
- Elevation: 4,019 ft (1,225 m)
- Prominence: 590 ft (180 m)
- Listing: White Mountain 4000-Footers
- Coordinates: 43°56′02″N 71°24′21″W

Geography
- Location within New Hampshire
- Location: Grafton County, New Hampshire, U.S.
- Parent range: Sandwich Range
- Topo map: USGS Mount Tripyramid

Mount Whiteface is a 4,019 ft (1,225 m) mountain located in Grafton County, New Hampshire. The mountain is part of the Sandwich Range of the White Mountains. Whiteface is flanked to the northwest by Mount Tripyramid, and to the northeast by Mount Passaconaway. Whiteface is on the eastern border of the Sandwich Range Wilderness. To the east, between Whiteface, Passaconaway, and Mt. Wonalancet, lies The Bowl natural area, an unlogged cirque.

Mt. Whiteface lies within the watershed of the Saco River, which reaches the Gulf of Maine at Saco, Maine. The south side of Whiteface is drained by the Whiteface River, thence into the Cold River, Bearcamp River, Ossipee River, and the Saco River. The east side is drained by the Wonalancet River, thence into Swift River, and Bearcamp River. The north side is drained by Downes Brook, thence into another Swift River, and the Saco River.

The summit of Mt. Whiteface is in a wooded area along the Rollins Trail, approximately .3 miles (0.5 km) north of the top of the massive granite cliff for which the mountain is named. Many hikers reach the open area at the top of the cliff and do not realize the true summit is farther to the north.

The summit is popular among winter climbers, favoring the Blueberry Ledge trail for ascent.

== History ==
In the 1850s, the first official trail to the summit is built, the McCrillis trail.

In 1871, the United States Coast Survey erected a signal station on the summit.

In 1875, the poet Lucy Larcom visited the summit, and wrote a sonnet about it.

In 1895, Thomas S. Wiggin cuts the Wiggin trail to the summit, branching from Dicey's Mill Trail.

In 1899, Gordon H. Taylor blazes the Blueberry Ledge Trail, useful for snowshoeing.

In 1914, The Bowl is added to the WMNF.

In 1931, The bowl is designated as a Research Natural Area.

In 1984, Congress creates the Sandwich Range Wilderness, including Mount Whiteface.

In 2002, Camp Shehadi and Camp Heermance are removed due to deterioration.

== Climate ==
Climate data for Mount Whiteface 43.9356 N, 71.4081 W, Elevation: 3,727 ft (1,136 m) (1991–2020 normals)
Month	Jan	Feb	Mar	Apr	May	Jun	Jul	Aug	Sep	Oct	Nov	Dec	Year
Mean daily maximum °F (°C)	19.7 (−6.8)	22.0 (−5.6)	29.1 (−1.6)	44.3 (6.8)	56.6 (13.7)	65.0 (18.3)	69.5 (20.8)	68.2 (20.1)	61.7 (16.5)	49.3 (9.6)	35.3 (1.8)	25.2 (−3.8)	45.5 (7.5)
Daily mean °F (°C)	11.8 (−11.2)	13.5 (−10.3)	20.2 (−6.6)	33.9 (1.1)	46.3 (7.9)	55.2 (12.9)	59.9 (15.5)	58.9 (14.9)	52.5 (11.4)	40.7 (4.8)	28.9 (−1.7)	18.8 (−7.3)	36.7 (2.6)
Mean daily minimum °F (°C)	4.0 (−15.6)	5.0 (−15.0)	11.3 (−11.5)	23.5 (−4.7)	36.0 (2.2)	45.4 (7.4)	50.4 (10.2)	49.5 (9.7)	43.2 (6.2)	32.2 (0.1)	22.4 (−5.3)	12.3 (−10.9)	27.9 (−2.3)
Average precipitation inches (mm)	5.69 (145)	4.49 (114)	5.56 (141)	5.37 (136)	6.31 (160)	7.00 (178)	6.90 (175)	7.08 (180)	4.94 (125)	7.05 (179)	5.88 (149)	6.66 (169)	72.93 (1,851)
Source: PRISM Climate Group

== See also ==
- List of mountains in New Hampshire
- White Mountain National Forest
