= South Tamworth, New Hampshire =

Unincorporated community in New Hampshire, United States

- Unincorporated community
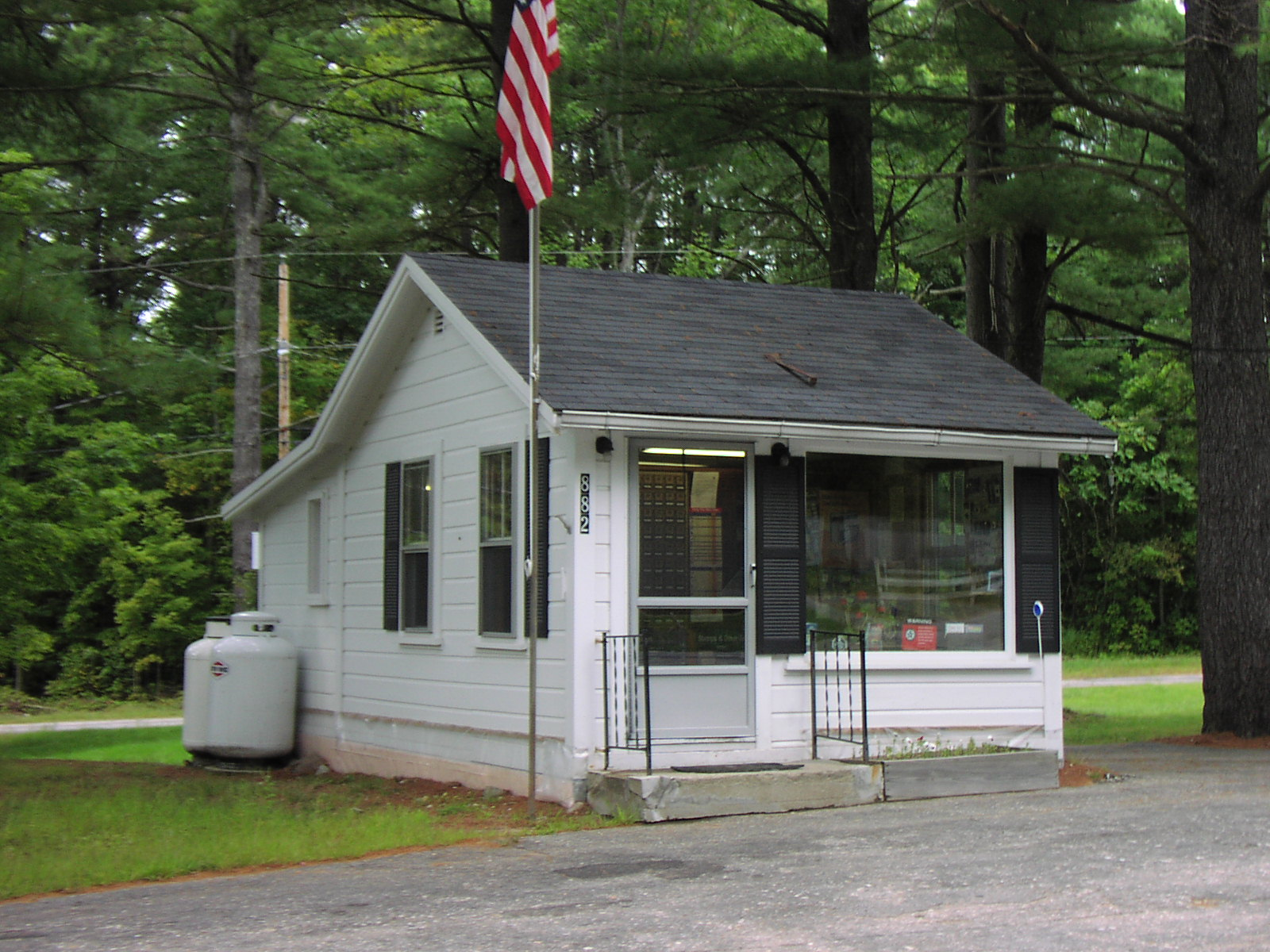
- South Tamworth Post Office

- Location within New Hampshire Location within the United States
- Coordinates: 43°49′29″N 71°18′11″W
- Country: United States
- State: New Hampshire
- County: Carroll
- Town: Tamworth
- Elevation: 577 ft (176 m)
- Time zone: UTC-5 (Eastern (EST))
  - Summer (DST): UTC-4 (EDT)
- ZIP code: 03883
- Area code: 603
- GNIS feature ID: 870062

South Tamworth is an unincorporated community in the town of Tamworth in Carroll County, New Hampshire, United States. It is located along New Hampshire Route 25, next to the Bearcamp River. Route 25 continues east past the village of Whittier to West Ossipee, where it intersects New Hampshire Route 16. To the west, Route 25 leads to Moultonborough, Center Harbor, and Meredith.

South Tamworth has a separate ZIP code (03883) from the rest of Tamworth.
