= Swift River (Bearcamp River tributary) =

- The Swift River near NH 113A in Tamworth, NH

- Location within New Hampshire Location within the United States

Location
- Country: United States
- State: New Hampshire
- County: Carroll
- Town: Tamworth

Physical characteristics
- Source: Confluence of Wonalancet River and Paugus Brook
  - location: Tamworth
  - coordinates: 43°53′39″N 71°17′47″W
  - elevation: 740 ft (230 m)
- Mouth: Bearcamp River
  - location: Tamworth
  - coordinates: 43°49′54″N 71°14′47″W
  - elevation: 435 ft (133 m)
- Length: 8.3 mi (13.4 km)

Basin features
- Tributaries
  - left: Bryant Brook
  - right: Blasde Brook, Mill Brook

The Swift River is an 8.3-mile-long (13.4 km) river located in eastern New Hampshire in the United States. It is a tributary of the Bearcamp River, part of the Ossipee Lake / Saco River watershed leading to the Atlantic Ocean. The Swift River is located only four miles south of the larger and longer Swift River which parallels the Kancamagus Highway in the White Mountain National Forest.

The Swift River begins at the confluence of Paugus Brook and the Wonalancet River in the northern part of Tamworth, New Hampshire, south of Mount Chocorua. The river flows southeast through a narrow valley, which opens up as it reaches Tamworth village. The Swift River slows before joining the Bearcamp River between the villages of Whittier and West Ossipee. Mill Brook joins near the Swift River's mouth.

== See also ==
- List of rivers of New Hampshire
