= Wonalancet (sachem) =

17th-century Native American leader in New England

Wonalancet (c.1619—1697) — also spelled Wannalancet and Wannalancit and probably Wanaloset and Wanalosett — was a sachem or sagamore of the Penacook Indians. He was the son of Passaconaway.

== Biography ==
Wonalancet was born c.1619 after one of the worst epidemics in human history killed 75-90% of the populations of the indigenous peoples of New England. He was supposedly born near Pawtucket Falls in what is now Lowell, Massachusetts, where his father was politically active trying to bring political stability among allies. He was most likely the second son of his father, Passaconaway, whose Penacook or Pennacook confederation of Upper Merrimack bands was at the time closely allied with the Pawtucket confederation of bands along the lower Merrimack (as well as the coastal tribes from the North Shore to the Saco in Maine). The previous "bashaba," or "chief of chiefs" of the alliance had been Nanepashemet, the sachem of the Pawtucket, who was killed on the north bank of the Mystic River at what now is Malden in 1619. These allied, "central Abenakian" peoples, were under repeated attacks at the time from the "Tarrantines," or Mi'kmaq of Maine, going back to possibly as early as 1607. Wonalancet's father, Passaconaway, would rise from sachem of the Pennacook to bashaba well before the time John Eliot hears the phrase when meeting with him at Pawtucket Falls in 1647.

While Wonalancet's other siblings were married to the children of other elite sagamores and sachems of allied tribes, it is unclear who Wonalancet's wife was, although much evidence points toward her coming from allied tribes of the Abenaki to the north of Pennacook and possibly as far as the St. Francis River. Throughout the epidemics of the 17th century, especially the deadly outbreak of smallpox in 1633, Wonalancet preferred to stay in the vicinity of Pawtucket Falls and had a particular love for Wickasauke Island, which was his preferred residence. But in 1637, the British massacred the Pequot in what is now Connecticut, ending the early period of harmonious relations. Fearing reprisals from the friendly Pawtucket and Pennacook, the English set out to arrest Passaconaway at Pawtucket Falls. Finding only his son, Wonalancet, they arrested him along with his wife and children. Wonalancet would escape, but the English would not return his family until Passaconaway and Wonalancet had ensured the English that the Pennacook had turned in all their firearms.

In 1653, missionary John Eliot was allowed to create a "praying town" for the local Pawtucket and Pennacook at nearby Wamesit, what is now Chelmsford (and had also been at times the home site of the Wamesit band of the Pawtucket). Wonalancet would become good friends with Daniel Gookin, chief administrator of English missions, which is much of why we know so much about Wonalancet, his family, and their betrayal by the English. By 1660, Passaconaway had become very old and was petitioning for land to settle on a farm of his own near the Souhegan (not in Pennacook itself, as David Stewart-Smith 1998 has argued quite successfully). It was in 1660 that Passaconaway abdicated his authority over the Pennacook to Wonalancet, who continued to maintain diplomatic relations with the English. In 1662 and 1663, Passaconaway and his sons Nanamocumuck and Wonalancet successfully petitioned for and were given lands between what is now Groton and Nashua in attempt to create a southern barrier between English settlement and the Pennacook heartland, which stretched to the north as far as the New Hampshire Lakes Region. The English had previously taken an allied sagamore hostage, and Wickasauke island had been traded to the English for the elder's release. In the 1660s, Wonalancet and several of his family members signed petitions to have Wickasauke Island returned to them, and Wonalancet would eventually relinquish his land grant near Groton for the return of the island near Pawtucket Falls, which clearly held great value to him and his dwindling people.

While Wonalancet would finally be baptized in 1674 as a sign that he and his people were not taking sides during King Philip's War, harassment from the local English would force him to remove his people to Pennacook in the north in 1675 (to what is now Concord, NH). Captain Mosely from Massachusetts followed Wonalancet and his followers to Pennacook, where they stood aside as Mosely burned the village and all their winter stores, leaving them to starve and freeze. Mosely was deemed a hero. When increasing harassment from Massachusetts colonists led the rest of the Christian Wamesit "praying town" people to flee north, their sagamore, Nobhow (who had married one of Wonalancet's sisters, Bess) left a note for the English, "We go towards the French, we go where Wanalansit is." Because Mosely had destroyed Pennacook in the late fall, Nobhow, Mystic George (a Pawtucket powwow), and many of the party died during the trip. Those who survived returned through the snow in January having not found Wonalancet, who had ostensibly fled to his wife's people (the Abenaki) to the north after the destruction of Pennacook by Mosely.

Wonalancet would emerge again the next year, in 1676, as an important peacemaker, gathering the northern and coastal tribes who had taken refuge from the war to show their faith to the English. Along with 400 of the most important leaders of his alliance, he met with Captain Richard Waldron in Cocheco. Waldron, however, broke their peace deal and took them all prisoner. While Waldron would eventually agree to let Wonalancet and half of his party free, to send a message, 200 of the party were enslaved for life and sent to Barbados to die on plantations. This party that was sent to slavery by Waldron included Wenepaweekin, Wonalancet's brother in law, the old sagamore of Naumkeg (Salem), who was the last living son of the Pawtucket Bashaba Nanepeshamet (who had died in 1619).

Facing more direct harassment at Wickasaukee Island in 1677 from his English neighbors and their Mohawk allies from New York, Wonalancet moved north to the protection of Pennacook with the last 50 survivors of the Wamesit mission. In 1685 he would sell Wickasauke Island to Jonathan Tyng. By this time he had abdicated his authority over what was left of his people to his older brother's son, Kankamagus, who would briefly be known as the Pennacook war chief while avenging the savagery and immorality of Captain Waldron and the English under his protection. In 1689, Kankamagus would gather the Pennacook and their allies to a great war council to target Waldron for his repeated broken promises and treaties. On June 27, 1689, they attacked Cocheco, killing 23 people who resisted and taking 29 others captive, including Waldron's daughter. Waldron himself, who had bragged the night before that if attacked he could immediately rally 100 men to his defense, was ritually executed by multiple people he had wronged throughout his life. The war would last into the 18th century, but in 1690 Benjamin Church would capture Kankamagus's wife and children, forcing him to capitulate. This led Kankamagus to sign a peace treaty on the Kennebec delta that year, and he would finally remove his people to the protection of the French and Abenakian allies to the north.

In March 1692, two old sagamores from Pennacook, Wonalancet and Wattanummon, traveled down the Merrimack to Dunstable (now Nashua) to seek peaceful coexistence with the English. In return for their good will, they were both immediately arrested by the English. Jonathan Tyng would step in and sponsor Wonalancet, essentially taking care of him in his old age while he waited out his death under "house arrest" rather than being sent into enslavement in Barbados. Tyng would personally support Wonalancet, who must have been a friend, and bury Wonalancet himself in 1697, probably on his land or on Wonalancet's beloved Wickasauke Island. David Stewart-Smith (1994, 1998) provides good evidence that many of Wonalancet's descendants joined others in migrating to the protection of the White Mountains and eventually the French.

Rarely was a group of indigenous Americans so pacifist toward the English so early in the colonial period as the Pennacook and Pawtucket under Passaconaway and Wonalancet. Such betrayals as they suffered would continue from New England to California until it would be impossible for America's first people to be able to claim their rightful land (or get current residents to accept they are living on stolen land). Wonalancet's legacy, however, is not one of defeat. As David Stewart-Smith writes (1998: 464) “If it is strategy to see one’s community survive, the northern tribes of New England succeeded under fatal odds .... Small Indian communities still survive in New England and the old blood flows hidden in many Yankee and French Canadian families, bearing some quiet testimony to the land and lasting portent for the future.”

== Misinformation ==
As is true of the early colonial period in New England and the history of indigenous Americans in general, there is a great deal of misinformation about Passaconaway and Wonalancet, including a lack of consensus about the meanings of their names. While town histories such as Coburn's History of Dracut and Potter's History of Manchester portend to be "histories," they often contain more misinformation than fact. They are storytelling, and are interesting as oral history, but not for explaining historical events and people. Unfortunately, they are repeatedly cited, and misinformation about this period and the people abounds and is continually spread. English writers liked the fables they told of Passaconaway and Wonalancet because they were the "pacifist" chiefs who never actually double-crossed the English nor fought them. The real story of their betrayal and repeated arrest and enslavement at the hands of the English is almost never told. Further, the perpetuation of the story that Wonalancet's sister Bess, wife of Nobhow, simply foolishly sold what became Lowell and Chelmsford to the English for the sum of four yards of Duffill and one pound of tobacco is shameful. Yet the fact that story still remains from the colonial era and is retold in the 21st century as a means to forget crimes of the past should give us pause for reflection.

== Legacy ==
The name "Wonalancet" translates to "Pleasant Breathing". His name is or has been preserved by:

- Wonalancet, New Hampshire, an unincorporated village within the town of Tamworth
- The Wonalancet River, which flows through the village
- Mount Wonalancet, elevation 2,780 feet (850 m), in the Sandwich Range, overlooking the village

As well as a mill, street, lodge, and pair of U.S. Navy vessels, all listed here.

== Sources ==
- Stewart-Smith, David (1998). The Pennacook Indians and the New England frontier, circa 1604-1733 (Thesis). ProQuest 304504354.
- Stewart-Smith, David (December 1994). "Pennacook-Pawtucket Relations: The Cycles of Family Alliance on the Merrimack River in the 17th Century". Algonquian Papers. 25: 445–468.
- (ship namesake paragraph)
- (ship namesake paragraph)
