= Mount Passaconaway =

Mountain in New Hampshire, United States

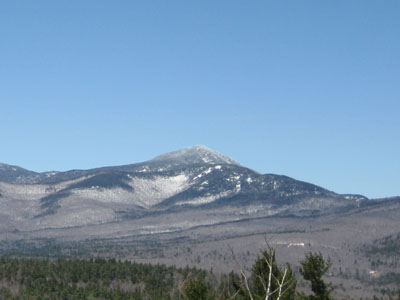
- Mt. Passaconaway as seen from Great Hill

Highest point
- Elevation: 4,043 ft (1,232 m)
- Prominence: 803 ft (245 m)
- Coordinates: 43°57′17″N 71°22′53″W

Geography
- Location: Grafton County, New Hampshire, U.S.
- Parent range: Sandwich Range, White Mountains
- Topo map: USGS Mount Tripyramid

Climbing
- Easiest route: Hike

Mount Passaconaway is a 4,043 ft (1,232 m) mountain in the Sandwich Range Wilderness of the White Mountain National Forest in Grafton County, New Hampshire, near Waterville Valley. It is named after Passaconaway, a 16th-century sachem of the Pennacook tribe, whose name was also attached to a small village in Albany, where the northern trailhead is now located.

It is ranked 42nd in elevation on the list of 48 White Mountains four-thousand footers. On the original 1931 list of 4000-footers, it was ranked 26th, with an elevation of 4,116 feet (1,255 m), although the 1931 topographic map shows it as 4,060 feet (1,240 m). The 1987 USGS topographic map indicates it is 4,043 feet, while the elevation recorded in the USGS Geographic Names Information System is 4,019 feet (1,225 m).

The thickly wooded, unmarked summit may be approached from trailheads to the north (on the Kancamagus Highway) or from Wonalancet to the south.

Passaconaway was originally named "North Whiteface" by Arnold Guyot, who probably was the first white person to ascend it. State geologist Charles Henry Hitchcock gave it its present name in honor of Passaconaway, a Pennacook chieftain. Passaconaway's children, Wonalancet and Nanomocomuck, have their names memorialized by the spurs of the mountain.

== History ==
In the 1700s, Old Mast Road was cut to haul white pine trees for the Royal Navy.

In 1890, a landslide scarred much of the northwest face of the mountain. This was converted to the Downes Brook Slide Trail.

In 1891, Kate Sleeper opened an inn near the base, and the region grew in popularity. Local residents carved out Dicey's Mill Trail. The "Passaconaway Lodge" was built on the southeast aspect of the mountain.

In 1899, the Appalachian Mountain Club cut the Passaconaway Loop, making possible a loop over the summit.

In 1914, the forest in the glacial valley below the mountain, named The Bowl, was added to the WMNF to prevent logging.

In 1948, Passaconaway Lodge was renamed Camp Rich. The structure was rebuilt in 1925 and 1953.

In 1984, the Sandwich Range Wilderness was established, including most of Passaconaway.

In 2000, Camp Rich collapsed and was removed, consistent with Wilderness regulations.

In 2006, the Sandwich Range Wilderness was expanded to include all of Passaconaway.

== See also ==
- Defunct placenames of New Hampshire
