= Cold River (Bearcamp River tributary) =

- The Cold River at the village of Whiteface in Sandwich, NH

- Location within New Hampshire Location within the United States

Location
- Country: United States
- State: New Hampshire
- County: Carroll
- Town: Sandwich

Physical characteristics
- Source: Sandwich Mountain
  - location: Sandwich
  - coordinates: 43°53′31″N 71°30′27″W
  - elevation: 3,100 ft (940 m)
- Mouth: Bearcamp River
  - location: Sandwich
  - coordinates: 43°49′42″N 71°20′30″W
  - elevation: 585 ft (178 m)
- Length: 11.9 mi (19.2 km)

Basin features
- Tributaries
  - left: Pond Brook, Whiteface River
  - right: Tilton Brook

The Cold River is an 11.9-mile-long (19.2 km) river in the White Mountains of New Hampshire in the United States. It is a tributary of the Bearcamp River, part of the Ossipee River and Saco River watersheds. The river lies entirely in the town of Sandwich.

The Cold River begins on the southern slopes of Sandwich Mountain, within the Sandwich Wilderness of the White Mountain National Forest. The river flows generally east and then southeast, leaving the national forest, passing New Hampshire Route 113A in the village of Whiteface, and reaching the Bearcamp River close to the Sandwich/Tamworth town line.

== See also ==
- List of rivers of New Hampshire
