= Waterville Valley, New Hampshire =

- Town
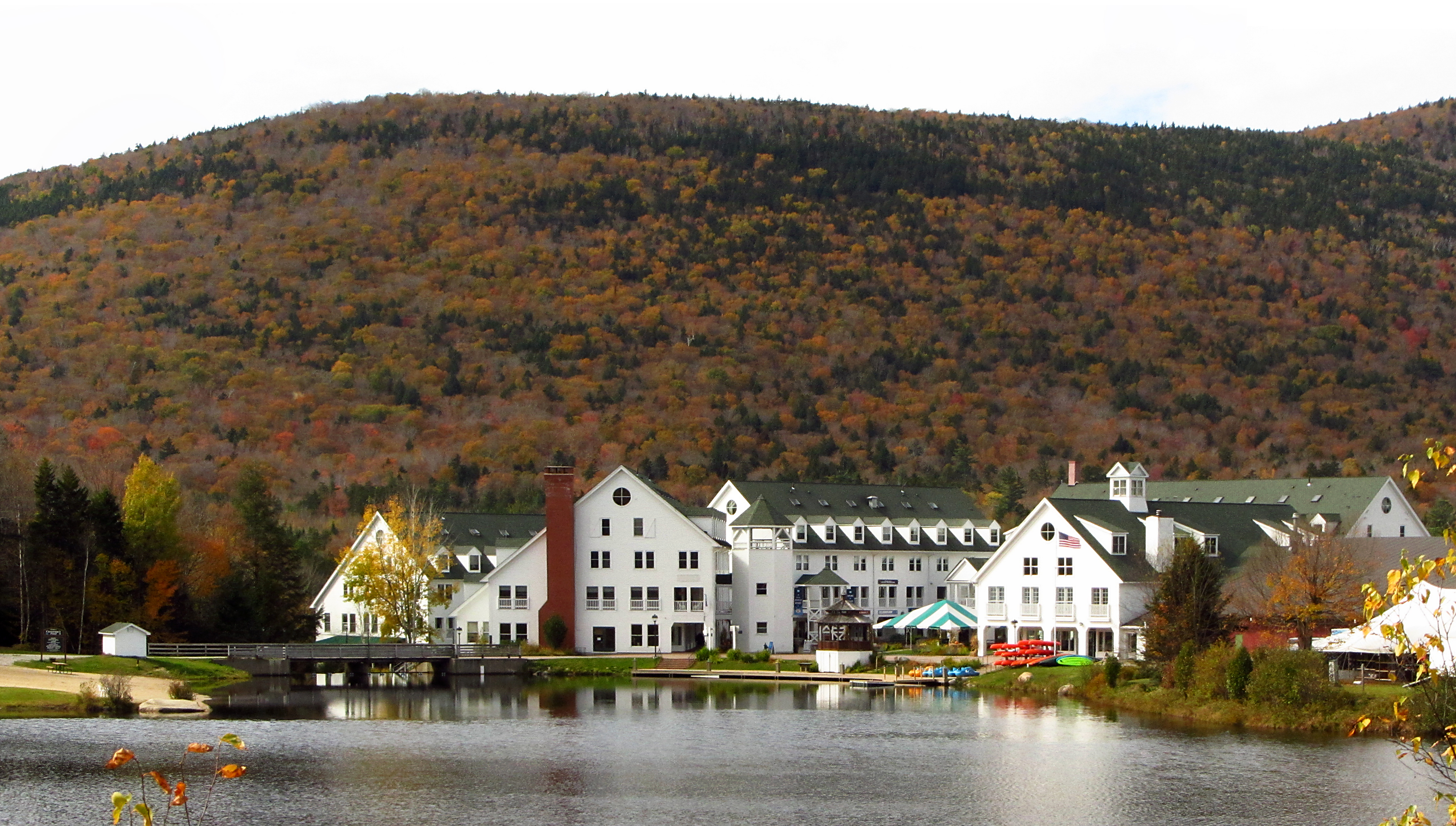
- Waterville Valley Town Square

- Logo
- Motto: "The Town at the End of the Road"
- Location in Grafton County, New Hampshire
- Coordinates: 43°56′48″N 71°28′43″W
- Country: United States
- State: New Hampshire
- County: Grafton
- Incorporated: 1829

Area
  - Total: 64.4 sq mi (166.9 km^{2})
  - Land: 64.3 sq mi (166.6 km^{2})
  - Water: 0.12 sq mi (0.3 km^{2}) 0.20%
- Elevation: 2,356 ft (718 m)

Population (2020)
  - Total: 508
  - Density: 7.8/sq mi (3/km^{2})
- Time zone: UTC−5 (Eastern)
  - Summer (DST): UTC−4 (Eastern)
- ZIP Code: 03215
- Area code: 603
- FIPS code: 33-79380
- GNIS feature ID: 873748
- Website: www.watervillevalleynh.gov

Waterville Valley is a New England town in Grafton County, New Hampshire, United States. The population was 508 at the 2020 census, up from 247 at the 2010 census.

It is a resort town which attracts many visitors in the winter months with alpine skiing at Waterville Valley Resort and many miles of trails for cross-country skiing. During the summer, attractions include a golf course, tennis courts, and a variety of hiking options. The Mad River flows through the town, providing great views all year round.

== History ==
The area was first settled in the 1760s, and incorporated as "Waterville" in 1829. The name "Waterville Valley" was adopted in 1967.

== Geography ==
According to the United States Census Bureau, the town has a total area of 64.4 square miles (166.9 km^{2}), of which 64.3 square miles (166.6 km^{2}) are land and 0.1 square miles (0.3 km^{2}) are water, comprising 0.20% of the town. The central part of the town is drained by the Mad River, which flows southwest toward the Pemigewasset River, part of the Merrimack River watershed. The southeastern section of town is drained by the Whiteface and Wonalancet rivers, southward-flowing tributaries of the Bearcamp River and part of the Saco River watershed. The northeastern part of the town is drained by the Swift River, another tributary of the Saco.

The highest point in Waterville Valley is the North Peak of Mount Tripyramid, at 4,180 feet (1,270 m) above sea level. Other 4000-footers in the town include Mount Tecumseh in the west (formerly listed as 4,003 feet (1,220 m) but recently revised to 3,997 feet (1,218 m)), and Mounts Whiteface (4,019 feet/1,225 m) and Passaconaway (4,043 feet/1,232 m) in the east. 3,983-foot (1,214 m) Sandwich Mountain is on the southern border.

== Climate ==
According to the Köppen Climate Classification system, Waterville Valley has a warm-summer humid continental climate, abbreviated "Dfb" on climate maps.

Climate data for Waterville Valley, New Hampshire, 1991–2020 normals
Month	Jan	Feb	Mar	Apr	May	Jun	Jul	Aug	Sep	Oct	Nov	Dec	Year
Mean daily maximum °F (°C)	27.7 (−2.4)	30.1 (−1.1)	37.6 (3.1)	50.4 (10.2)	63.1 (17.3)	71.7 (22.1)	77.2 (25.1)	75.9 (24.4)	69.4 (20.8)	55.7 (13.2)	43.3 (6.3)	33.3 (0.7)	53.0 (11.6)
Daily mean °F (°C)	16.7 (−8.5)	18.1 (−7.7)	26.5 (−3.1)	39.5 (4.2)	51.4 (10.8)	60.6 (15.9)	65.6 (18.7)	64.0 (17.8)	57.0 (13.9)	45.1 (7.3)	34.2 (1.2)	23.8 (−4.6)	41.9 (5.5)
Mean daily minimum °F (°C)	5.7 (−14.6)	6.1 (−14.4)	15.4 (−9.2)	28.5 (−1.9)	39.6 (4.2)	49.4 (9.7)	54.1 (12.3)	52.0 (11.1)	44.6 (7.0)	34.4 (1.3)	25.1 (−3.8)	14.4 (−9.8)	30.8 (−0.7)
Average precipitation inches (mm)	3.91 (99)	3.25 (83)	4.30 (109)	4.64 (118)	4.16 (106)	5.16 (131)	4.79 (122)	4.35 (110)	4.18 (106)	5.62 (143)	4.48 (114)	4.98 (126)	53.82 (1,367)
Source: NOAA

== Demographics ==
Historical population
Census	Pop.	Note	%±
1830	96		—
1840	63		−34.4%
1850	42		−33.3%
1860	48		14.3%
1870	33		−31.2%
1880	54		63.6%
1890	39		−27.8%
1900	50		28.2%
1910	16		−68.0%
1920	95		493.8%
1930	23		−75.8%
1940	26		13.0%
1950	11		−57.7%
1960	14		27.3%
1970	109		678.6%
1980	180		65.1%
1990	151		−16.1%
2000	257		70.2%
2010	247		−3.9%
2020	508		105.7%
U.S. Decennial Census

As of the census of 2000, there were 257 people, 121 households, and 75 families residing in the town. The population density was 4.0 people per square mile (1.5/km^{2}). There were 1,097 housing units at an average density of 16.9 per square mile (6.5/km^{2}). The racial makeup of the town was 97.28% White, 1.95% Asian, 0.78% from other races. Hispanic or Latino of any race were 1.56% of the population.

There were 121 households, out of which 27.3% had children under the age of 18 living with them, 45.5% were married couples living together, 9.1% had a female householder with no husband present, and 38.0% were non-families. 34.7% of all households were made up of individuals, and 6.6% had someone living alone who was 65 years of age or older. The average household size was 2.12 and the average family size was 2.72.

In the town, the population was spread out, with 22.2% under the age of 18, 6.6% from 18 to 24, 20.6% from 25 to 44, 37.0% from 45 to 64, and 13.6% who were 65 years of age or older. The median age was 45 years. For every 100 females, there were 104.0 males. For every 100 females age 18 and over, there were 108.3 males.

The median income for a household in the town was $40,417, and the median income for a family was $55,625. Males had a median income of $34,167 versus $34,063 for females. The per capita income for the town was $26,400. About 6.8% of families and 6.2% of the population were below the poverty line, including 6.7% of those under the age of eighteen and none of those 65 or over.

== Education ==
The Waterville Valley Elementary School is also known as the "Little Red School" and had 41 students enrolled in kindergarten through 8th grade for the 2011–2012 school year. The children at the school are able to bike, swim, ski, skate, and play tennis in Waterville Valley. There is a recreation department attached to the "Little Red School".

The Waterville Valley Academy (WVA) is a ski academy, founded in 1972. The campus is located at 88 Boulder Path Rd, at the foot of Snow's Mountain. It has around 160 students and is part of the WVBBTS ski club, the oldest ski club in America. In 2013, the school expanded its academic programming and began to offer a full-year program known as the Pinnacle Program.

== Culture ==
Since 1994, Waterville Valley has hosted the Russell Sage Foundation Summer Institute in Behavioral Economics (BE). 2016 Economics Nobel Laureate Richard Thaler describes the institute as an important driver of the early growth of behavioral economics.

== Notable people ==
- Gene Conley (1930–2017), NBA player and MLB All-Star pitcher
- Tom Corcoran (1931–2017), resort founder, Olympic skier
- John E. Sununu (born 1964), US congressman, senator
