= Albany, New Hampshire =

- Town
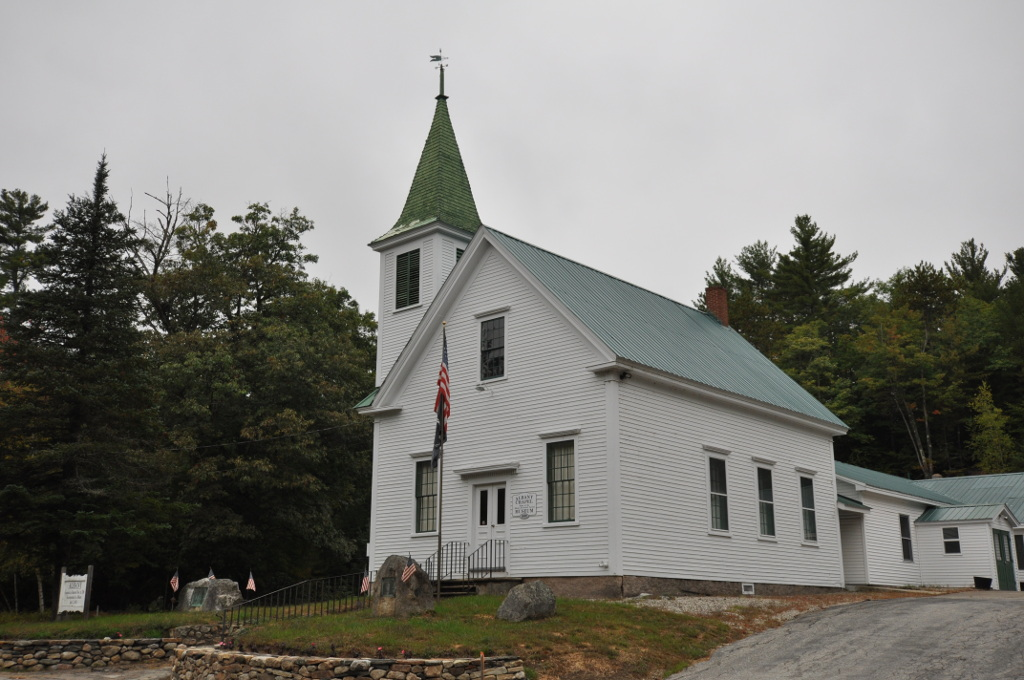
- Albany Chapel, Museum, and Town Offices

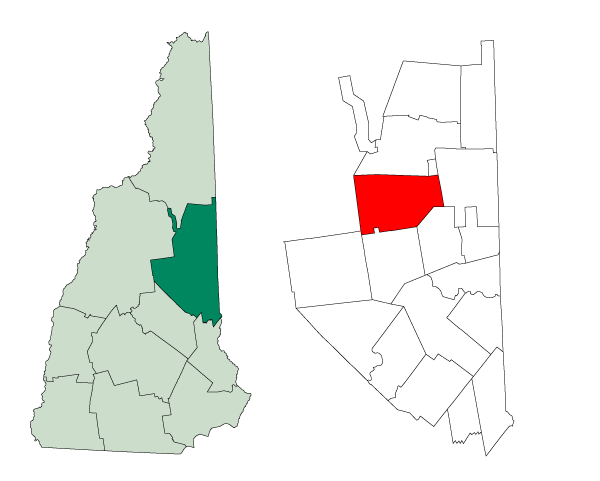
- Location in Carroll County, New Hampshire
- Coordinates: 43°59′36″N 71°16′13″W
- Country: United States
- State: New Hampshire
- County: Carroll
- Incorporated: 1833
- Villages: Albany; Ferncroft

Government
  - Board of Selectmen: Rick Hiland; Kelly Robitaille; James Drouin

Area
  - Total: 75.8 sq mi (196.2 km^{2})
  - Land: 75.1 sq mi (194.6 km^{2})
  - Water: 0.58 sq mi (1.5 km^{2}) 0.79%
- Elevation: 2,221 ft (677 m)

Population (2020)
  - Total: 759
  - Density: 10/sq mi (3.9/km^{2})
- Time zone: UTC-5 (Eastern)
  - Summer (DST): UTC-4 (Eastern)
- ZIP code: 03818
- Area code: 603
- FIPS code: 33-00420
- GNIS feature ID: 873526
- Website: www.albanynh.org

Albany is a town in Carroll County, New Hampshire, United States. The population was 759 at the 2020 census, and an estimated 781 in 2025.

Most of Albany is within the southeastern corner of the White Mountain National Forest, including Mount Chocorua and Mount Paugus. Albany is the entrance to the Mount Washington Valley, and features a 120-foot (37 m) covered bridge that spans the Swift River just north of the Kancamagus Highway. Albany is also home to the World Fellowship Center, an intergenerational camp and conference retreat center founded in 1941 by and for peace activists.

== History ==
The community was first chartered in 1766 by colonial Governor Benning Wentworth as "Burton", for General Jonathan Burton of Wilton, New Hampshire. The town was incorporated and renamed "Albany" in 1833, when the New York Central Railroad from New York City to Albany, New York, was chartered.

== Geography ==
According to the United States Census Bureau, the town has a total area of 75.8 square miles (196.2 km^{2}), of which 75.1 square miles (194.6 km^{2}) are land and 0.58 square miles (1.5 km^{2}) are water, comprising 0.79% of the town. It is drained by the Swift River in the north and the Chocorua River in the south. The town lies fully within the Saco River watershed. Mount Chocorua, the highest point in Albany, has an elevation of 3,474 feet (1,059 m), and Mount Paugus has an elevation of 3,201 ft (976 m).

Eighty-five percent of the area in the town is part of the White Mountain National Forest. Most residential development occurs in the southeastern portion of the town, along New Hampshire Route 16. Route 112, the Kancamagus Highway, runs east–west along the Swift River and is nearly entirely within the national forest. The former village of Passaconaway occupies a broad valley along the Kancamagus Highway in the northwestern part of the town. The area is now a national forest visitor attraction. Other place names within the town limits include Ferncroft, in the extreme southwest corner of town, and the former site of Paugus Mill, along the town's southern boundary.

=== Adjacent municipalities ===
- Bartlett (north)
- Hale's Location (northeast)
- Conway (east)
- Madison (southeast)
- Tamworth (south)
- Sandwich (southwest)
- Waterville Valley (west)
- Livermore (northwest)

== Demographics ==
Historical population
Census	Pop.	Note	%±
1840	406		—
1850	455		12.1%
1860	430		−5.5%
1870	339		−21.2%
1880	361		6.5%
1890	377		4.4%
1900	210		−44.3%
1910	289		37.6%
1920	170		−41.2%
1930	96		−43.5%
1940	131		36.5%
1950	154		17.6%
1960	146		−5.2%
1970	259		77.4%
1980	383		47.9%
1990	536		39.9%
2000	654		22.0%
2010	735		12.4%
2020	759		3.3%
2024 (est.)	784		3.3%
U.S. Decennial Census

As of the census of 2000, there were 654 people, 262 households, and 182 families residing in the town. The population density was 8.7 people per square mile (3.4/km^{2}). There were 506 housing units at an average density of 6.8 per square mile (2.6/km^{2}). The racial makeup of the town was 98.47% White, 0.15% African American, 0.31% Native American, 0.15% Asian, 0.31% Pacific Islander, and 0.61% from two or more races. Hispanic or Latino of any race were 0.76% of the population.

There were 262 households, out of which 34.7% had children under the age of 18 living with them, 51.5% were married couples living together, 10.7% had a female householder with no husband present, and 30.2% were non-families. 23.3% of all households were made up of individuals, and 7.3% had someone living alone who was 65 years of age or older. The average household size was 2.48 and the average family size was 2.85.

In the town, the population was spread out, with 26.5% under the age of 18, 6.1% from 18 to 24, 36.7% from 25 to 44, 22.8% from 45 to 64, and 8.0% who were 65 years of age or older. The median age was 37 years. For every 100 females, there were 100.6 males. For every 100 females age 18 and over, there were 102.1 males.

The median income for a household in the town was $36,635, and the median income for a family was $39,250. Males had a median income of $29,821 versus $20,250 for females. The per capita income for the town was $20,690. About 10.8% of families and 15.7% of the population were below the poverty line, including 23.9% of those under age 18 and 4.3% of those age 65 or over.

== Transportation ==
Three New Hampshire State Routes cross Albany:

- NH 16 is the main route through the town's main village, and is known locally as the Chocorua Mountain Highway. It crosses the southeast corner of town, entering from Tamworth in the south, crossing briefly into Madison, reentering Albany again along a short concurrency with NH 113, and then leaving to the east into Conway.
- NH 112, the Kancamagus Highway, is a popular scenic drive that connects Waterville Valley in the west to Conway in the east. It closely follows the Swift River from Kancamagus Pass.
- NH 113 enters the town from Madison in the south, and immediately after crossing the town border, begins a concurrency with NH 16, before leaving into Conway in the east.
