= Wonalancet, New Hampshire =

Unincorporated community in New Hampshire, United States

- Unincorporated community
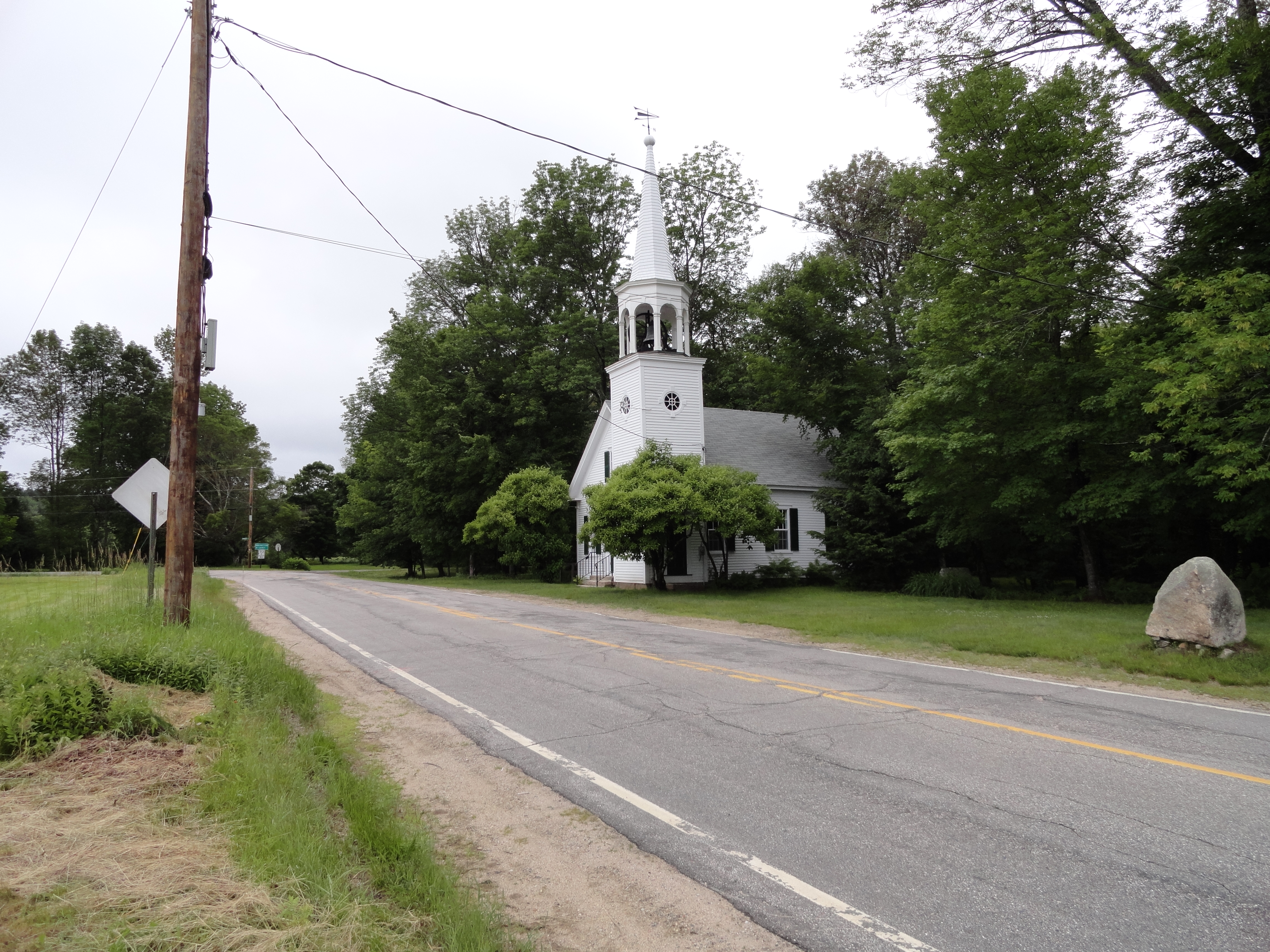
- Wonalancet Union Chapel in the center of the village

- Location within New Hampshire Location within the United States
- Coordinates: 43°54′26″N 71°21′2″W
- Country: United States
- State: New Hampshire
- County: Carroll
- Town: Tamworth
- Elevation: 1,099 ft (335 m)
- Time zone: UTC-5 (Eastern (EST))
  - Summer (DST): UTC-4 (EDT)
- ZIP code: 03897
- Area code: 603
- GNIS feature ID: 872963

Wonalancet is an unincorporated community in the northwestern corner of the town of Tamworth in Carroll County, New Hampshire, United States. Many popular hiking trails into the Sandwich Range of the White Mountains have trailheads in the area, particularly in the locale known as Ferncroft, up a short spur road from Wonalancet.

The village is named for the 17th century Pennacook sachem Wonalancet.

Wonalancet has a separate ZIP code (03897) from the rest of Tamworth.

== See also ==
- Katherine Sleeper Walden
- Arthur Treadwell Walden
- Chinook (dog breed)
