= Mount Tripyramid (New Hampshire) =

Mountain in the state of New Hampshire

North Tripyramid
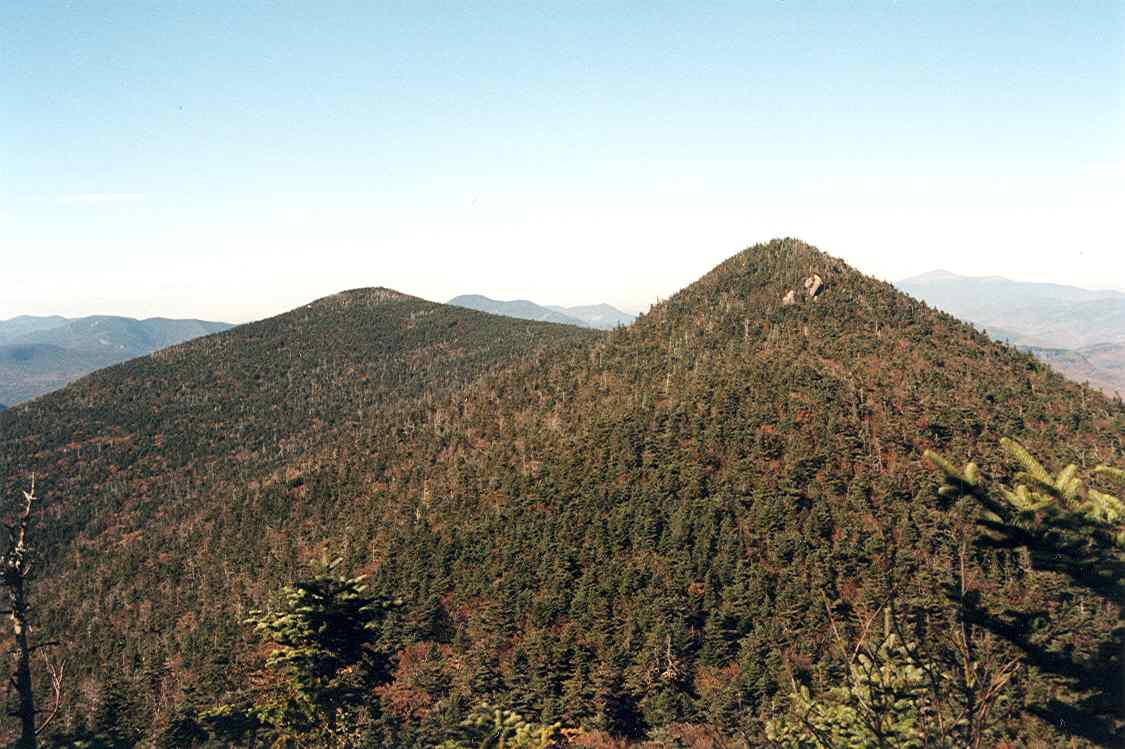
- North and Middle Peaks, Mount Tripyramid

Highest point
- Elevation: 4,160 ft (1,270 m)
- Prominence: 1,320 ft (400 m)
- Listing: New Hampshire 4000-footers
- Coordinates: 43°58′24″N 71°26′34″W

Geography
- Location: Grafton County, New Hampshire, U.S.
- Parent range: Sandwich Range
- Topo map: USGS Mount Tripyramid

Middle Tripyramid

Highest point
- Elevation: 4,120 ft (1,260 m)
- Prominence: 240 ft (73 m)
- Listing: New Hampshire 4000-footers
- Coordinates: 43°57′53″N 71°26′24″W

South Tripyramid

Highest point
- Elevation: 4,080 ft (1,240 m)
- Prominence: 80 ft (24 m)
- Coordinates: 43°57′37″N 71°26′29″W

Mount Tripyramid is a mountain located in Grafton County, New Hampshire. Part of the Sandwich Range of the White Mountains, it has three distinct peaks – North, Middle, and South – along its mile-long summit ridge. North, at 4,160 ft (1,270 m), is the highest. Scaur Peak and The Fool Killer are subsidiary peaks to the northwest and northeast. To the southeast, Tripyramid is flanked by The Sleepers.

Mt. Tripyramid is drained on the west side by Slide Brook and Avalanche Brook, thence into the Mad River, Pemigewasset River, Merrimack River, and into the Gulf of Maine at Newburyport, Massachusetts. Tripyramid is drained on the east side by Sabbaday Brook, thence into the Swift River, Saco River, and into the Gulf of Maine at Saco, Maine. Tripyramid is drained on the north side by Pine Bend Brook, another tributary of the Swift River.

Both North and Middle Tripyramid are included in the Appalachian Mountain Club's list of New England "four-thousand footers". Although over 4,000 feet in height, South Tripyramid is not, because it lacks topographic prominence, being less than 200 ft above the col on the ridge from Middle Tripyramid.

== See also ==
- List of mountains in New Hampshire
- White Mountain National Forest
