= Swift River (Saco River tributary) =

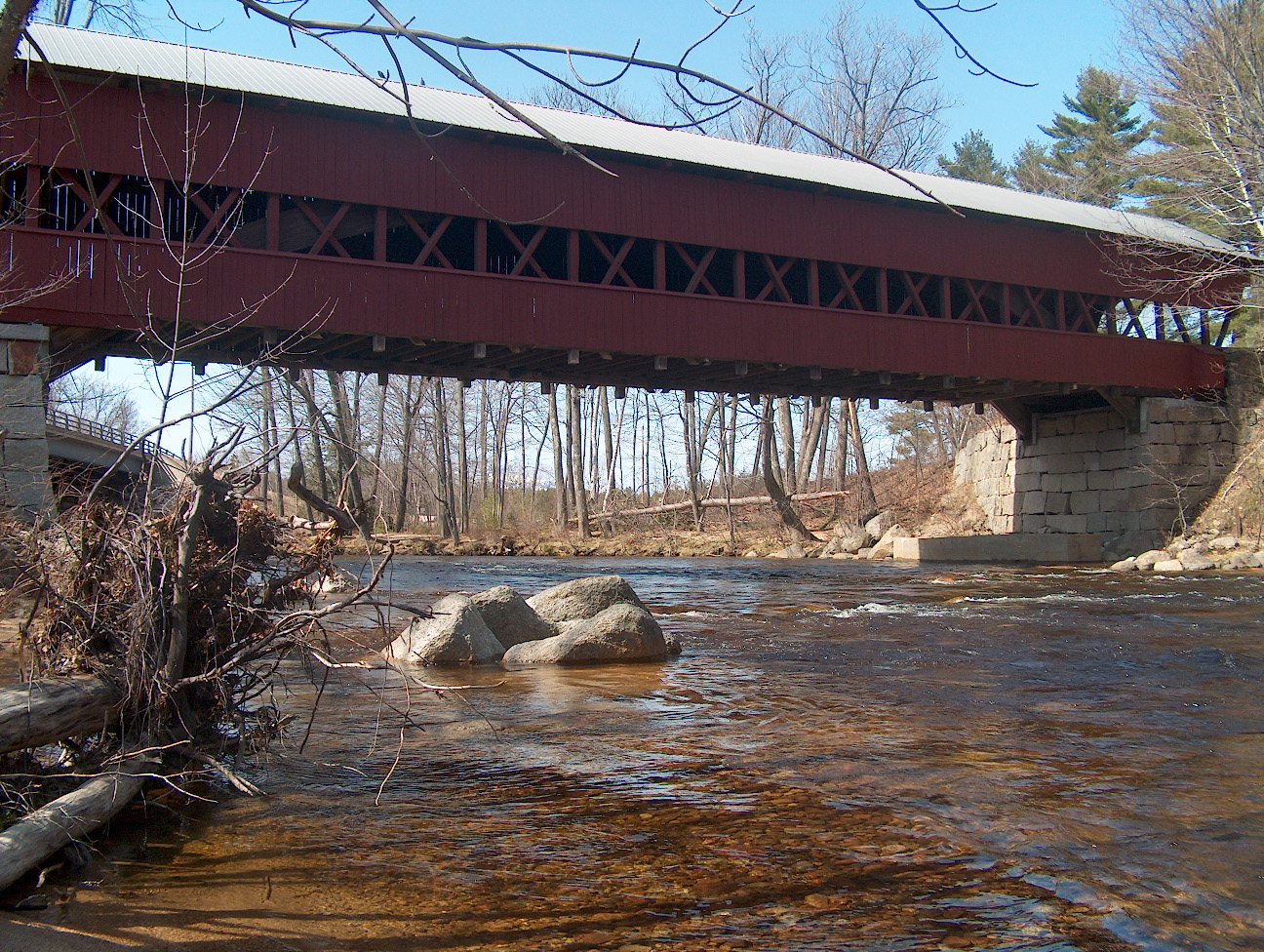
- Covered bridge over the Swift River at Conway, NH

Location
- Country: United States
- State: New Hampshire
- Region: White Mountains
- Towns: Livermore, Waterville Valley, Albany, Conway

Physical characteristics
- Source: Kancamagus Pass
  - location: Livermore
  - coordinates: 44°1′14″N 71°29′31″W
  - elevation: 2,780 ft (850 m)
- Mouth: Saco River
  - location: Conway
  - coordinates: 43°59′1″N 71°7′3″W
  - elevation: 435 ft (133 m)
- Length: 25.6 mi (41.2 km)

Basin features
- Tributaries
  - left: Pond Brook, Rob Brook, Douglas Brook, Red Eagle Brook
  - right: Pine Bend Brook, Sabbaday Brook, Downes Brook, Oliverian Brook, Champney Brook, Pequawket Brook

The Swift River is a 25.6-mile-long (41.2 km) river in the White Mountains of New Hampshire in the United States. It is a tributary of the Saco River, which flows to the Atlantic Ocean in Maine.

The Swift River rises in the township of Livermore, New Hampshire, on the eastern side of Kancamagus Pass, and flows east into a broad valley, surrounded by mountains, known as the Albany Intervale. Leaving the intervale, the river enters a narrow gorge, passing over two sets of small waterfalls, and continues east through the town of Albany to the Saco River at Conway.

The river is paralleled for its entire length by New Hampshire Route 112, the scenic Kancamagus Highway.

== See also ==
- List of rivers of New Hampshire
