= Bearcamp River =

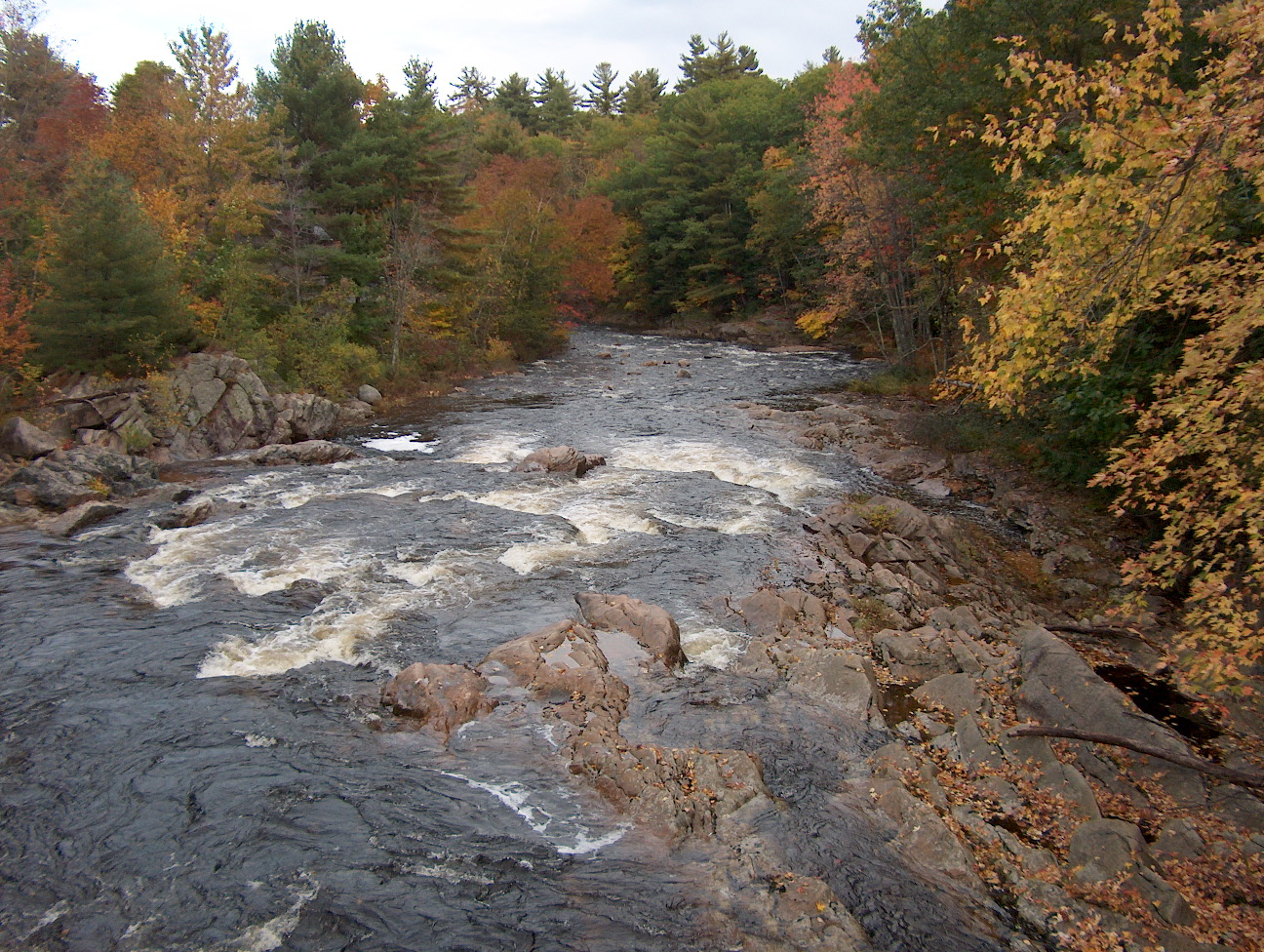
- The Bearcamp River in South Tamworth, New Hampshire

- Location within New Hampshire Location within the United States

Location
- Country: United States
- State: New Hampshire
- County: Carroll
- Towns: Sandwich, Tamworth, Ossipee

Physical characteristics
- Source: Sandwich Notch
  - location: Sandwich
  - coordinates: 43°50′13″N 71°30′44″W
  - elevation: 1,420 ft (430 m)
- Mouth: Ossipee Lake
  - location: Ossipee
  - coordinates: 43°47′51″N 71°9′27″W
  - elevation: 407 ft (124 m)
- Length: 26.3 mi (42.3 km)

Basin features
- Tributaries
  - left: Cold River, Swift River, Chocorua River

The Bearcamp River is a 26.3-mile-long (42.3 km) river at the southern edge of the White Mountains in New Hampshire, the United States. It is the largest tributary of Ossipee Lake, part of the Saco River watershed leading to the Atlantic Ocean.

The Bearcamp River rises in Sandwich Notch, at the northeast end of the Squam Mountain Range and the western end of the Sandwich Range, in the town of Sandwich, New Hampshire. It flows to the southeast, dropping over Beede Falls, and quickly reaches the lowlands at the base of the White Mountains. The river flows east through Sandwich, entering Tamworth at the juncture of the Cold River. Passing the villages of South Tamworth and Whittier, the river nears the base of the Ossipee Mountains to the south. It passes the village of West Ossipee and enters Ossipee Lake after flowing through a small delta.

New Hampshire Route 25 follows the river through Tamworth to West Ossipee.

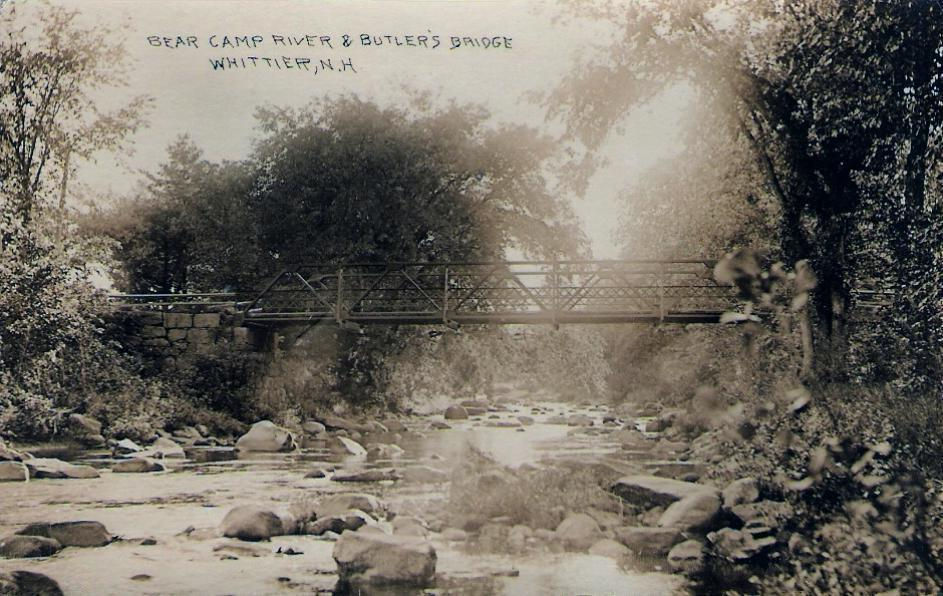
Bearcamp River in 1912

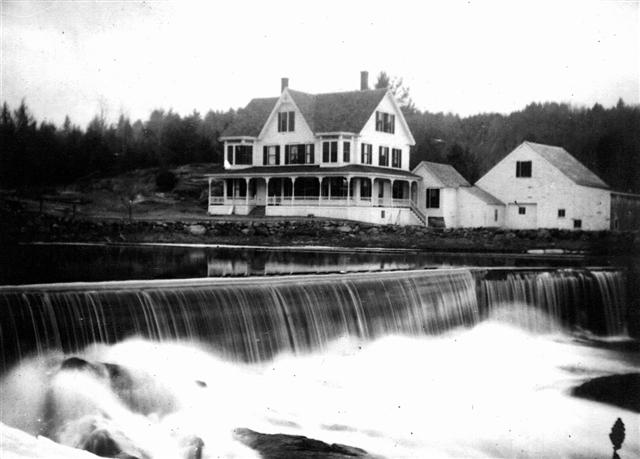
Former dam on the Bearcamp River at Bartlett Mill Road in South Tamworth, New Hampshire, in 1906; Bartlett House in background

== See also ==
- List of rivers of New Hampshire
