= Sandwich Range =

Mountain range in the American state of New Hampshire

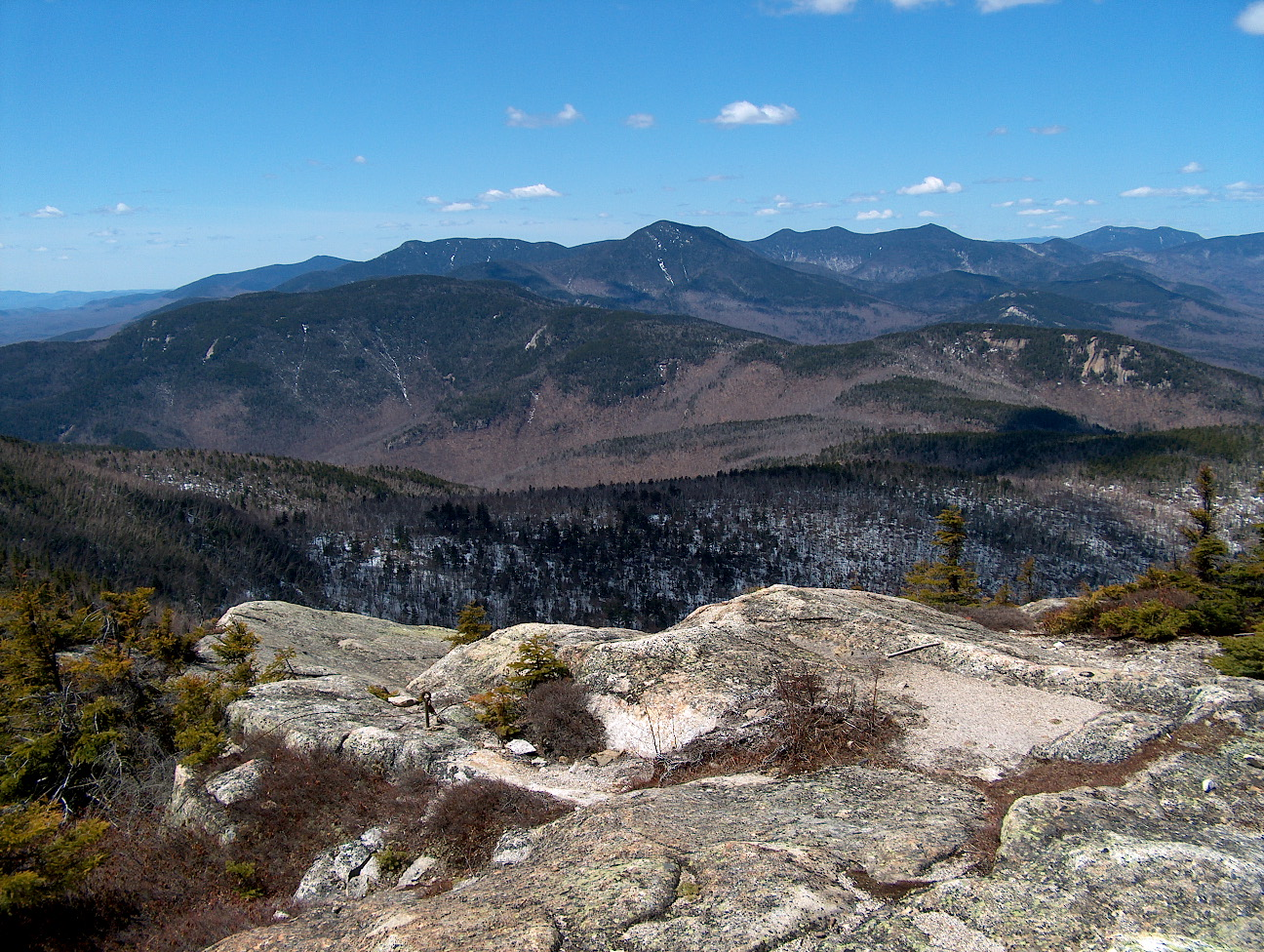
- The Sandwich Range as seen looking west from Mount Chocorua. Summits include Mount Paugus (mid-foreground), Mount Whiteface (horizon mid-left), Mount Passaconaway (horizon center), and Mount Tripyramid (horizon mid-right).

Highest point
- Peak: Mount Tripyramid
- Elevation: 4,170 ft (1,270 m)
- Coordinates: 43°58.40′N 71°26.57′W

Geography
- Country: United States
- State: New Hampshire
- Parent range: White Mountains, Appalachian Mountains

The Sandwich Range is located in the White Mountains of New Hampshire in the United States, north of the Lakes Region and south of the Kancamagus Highway. Although the range is not outstanding for its elevation, it is very rugged and has excellent views of the surrounding lakes, mountains, and forests.

The Sandwich Range extends east–west about 30 miles (48 km) from Conway, New Hampshire on the Saco River to Campton on the Pemigewasset River. The Kancamagus Highway runs along the north side of the mountains, from Conway to North Woodstock. The highest peak in the range is Mount Tripyramid, with an elevation of 4,170 feet (1,270 m).

The east part of the range drains by various streams into the Saco River and thence into the Atlantic Ocean at Saco, Maine. The west part drains into the East Branch Pemigewasset River and Mad River, thence into the Pemigewasset, Merrimack and into the sea at Newburyport, Massachusetts.

The range shares its name with the town of Sandwich, situated at the range's western end. To the south are the Ossipee Mountains, and the ancient volcanic ring dike of the Mt. Shaw massif.

== Summits ==
The range's summits include, among others:

- Mount Chocorua 3,490 ft (1,060 m)
- Mount Kancamagus 3,763 ft (1,147 m)
- Mount Passaconaway 4,043 ft (1,232 m) *
- Mount Paugus 3,198 ft (975 m)
- Mount Tripyramid 4,170 ft (1,270 m) *
- Mount Whiteface 4,020 ft (1,230 m) *
- Mount Wonalancet 2,760 ft (840 m)
- Sandwich Mountain 3,993 ft (1,217 m)
- The Sleepers 3,880 ft (1,180 m)

The summits marked with an asterisk (*) are included on the Appalachian Mountain Club's peak-bagging list of "Four-thousand footers" in New Hampshire.

== Wilderness ==
The Sandwich Range Wilderness was established in 1984 to protect the rugged southeastern portion of the White Mountains as part of the National Wilderness Preservation System. The 35,303-acre (142.87 km^{2}) wilderness area is all within the White Mountain National Forest and managed by the U.S. Forest Service. The wilderness area covers (from west to east) Sandwich Mountain, Mount Tripyramid, The Sleepers, Mount Whiteface, Mount Passaconaway, and Mount Paugus. Mount Kancamagus falls outside the wilderness area to the west, and Mount Chocorua is outside it to the east.

== See also ==
- List of mountains in New Hampshire
- Mount Shaw
- White Mountain National Forest
