= Swallow Boathouse =

- U.S. National Register of Historic Places
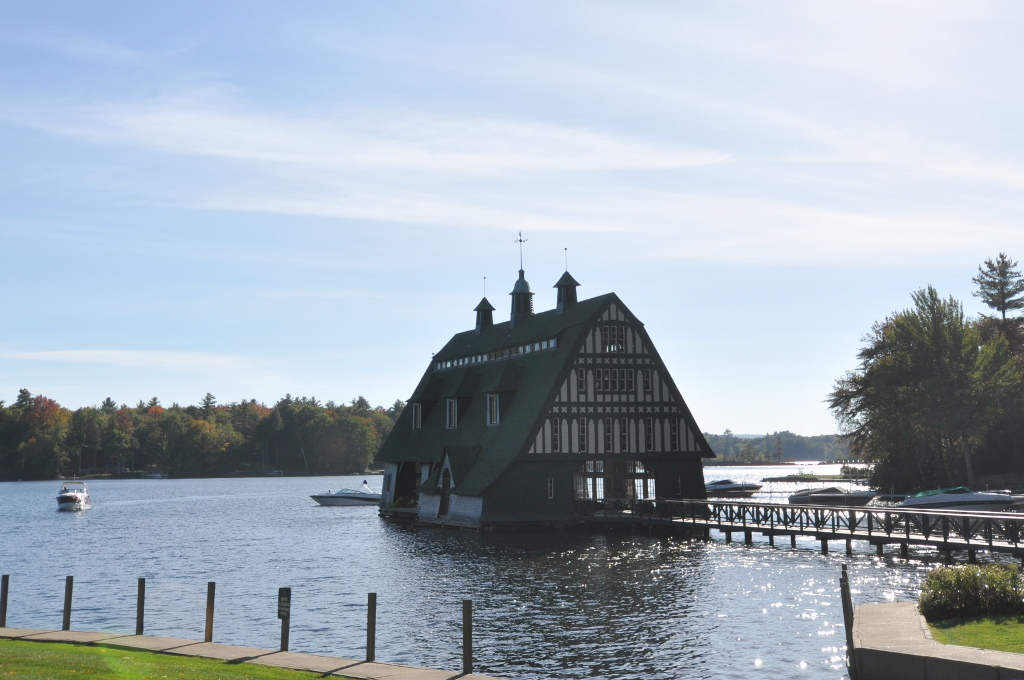

- Location within New Hampshire Location within the United States
- Nearest city: Moultonborough, New Hampshire
- Coordinates: 43°41′44″N 71°24′23″W
- Area: 2 acres (0.81 ha)
- Built: 1908
- Architect: Carlson, Harry J.
- Architectural style: Tudor Revival, Shingle Style
- NRHP reference No.: 80000272
- Added to NRHP: August 26, 1980

The Swallow Boathouse is a historic boathouse on Lake Winnipesaukee in central New Hampshire, United States. It is located in a cove on the west side of Moultonborough Neck, in the town of Moultonborough. Built in 1908-10, it is one of the state's most architecturally elaborate boathouses, exhibiting elements of the Tudor Revival and Shingle style. Now used exclusively by the association owners, it was listed on the National Register of Historic Places in 1980.

== Description and history ==
The Swallow boathouse is located on the west side of Moultonborough Neck, a long finger of land extending into Lake Winnipesaukee, New Hampshire's largest lake. It is set in Kona Bay, an inlet bounded on the north by Swallow Point and the south by Wallace Island. Land access to the boathouse is private via Kona Farm Avenue and Windward Avenue. The structure and neighborhood surrounding it is owned by a private association and is only accessible by water to the general public for viewing. It is a wooden structure 80 feet (24 m) long and 37 feet (11 m) wide, and is mounted on eight stone piers set in about 10 feet (3.0 m) of water. The boathouse is set back from the shore, and is accessed by a wooden walkway 138 feet (42 m) long. A crib of heavy timbers forms its base, with three structural bays topped by an expansive gambrel roof, with cupolas on each section. A portion of the interior, originally open to the water, has been floored over.

The boathouse was designed by Harry J. Carlson and built in 1908-10. The walkway was originally sheltered by a roof; that covering and a matching land pavilion have been removed due to storm damage. The boathouse was built to house the Swallow, a large seagoing yacht that was transported to the lake by rail by Herbert Dumaresque, owner of the Kona Farm estate on which the boathouse was located. Its size is more reminiscent of boathouses used for commercial operations, and Carlson appears to have based its design on an 1830s boathouse at the Portsmouth Naval Shipyard, elaborating it architecturally with Shingle and Tudor features.

== See also ==
- National Register of Historic Places listings in Carroll County, New Hampshire
