= Green Pastures (Sandwich, New Hampshire) =

Historic house in New Hampshire, United States

- U.S. National Register of Historic Places
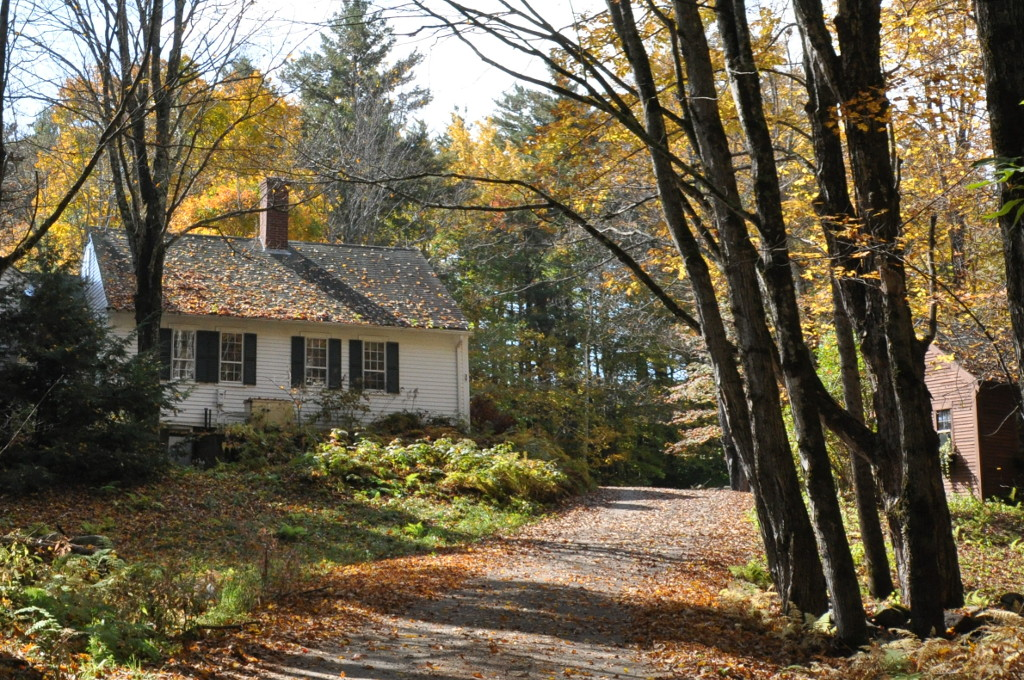
- Location: Address restricted Sandwich, New Hampshire
- Area: 38 acres (15 ha)
- Built: 1934
- NRHP reference No.: 16000145
- Added to NRHP: April 5, 2016

Green Pastures is a historic private summer estate near Squam Lake in Sandwich, New Hampshire. The 38-acre (15 ha) property includes a main house, several 19th-century barns, a former district schoolhouse, and a small sap house converted to a writing cabin. The property belonged to the locally prominent Coolidge family until 1934, when they sold it to Rev. T. Guthrie Speers Sr., the first minister to preach at the Chocorua Island Chapel, for his use as a summer residence.

The property was listed on the National Register of Historic Places in 2016.

== See also ==
- National Register of Historic Places listings in Carroll County, New Hampshire
