= Pratt Family Camps =

- U.S. National Register of Historic Places
- U.S. Historic district
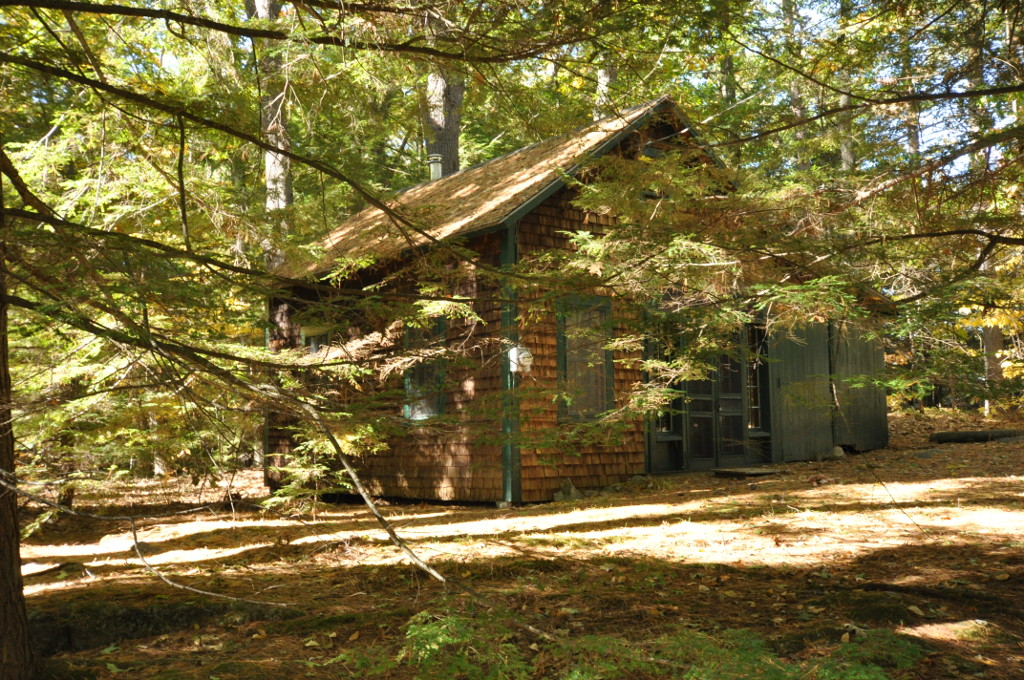
- Location: Address restricted near Squam Lake, Moultonborough, New Hampshire
- Area: 80 acres (32 ha)
- NRHP reference No.: 12000503
- Added to NRHP: August 15, 2012

The Pratt Family Camps are a related collection of historic summer camps in Moultonborough, New Hampshire. The camps consist of three primary camp houses and a collection of outbuildings constructed by the Pratt family over an 85-year period on more than 80 acres (32 ha) of lakefront property on Squam Lake.

The camps were listed on the National Register of Historic Places in 2012.

== See also ==
- National Register of Historic Places listings in Carroll County, New Hampshire
