= Hansen's Annex =

Historic house in New Hampshire, United States

- U.S. National Register of Historic Places
- U.S. Historic district – Contributing property
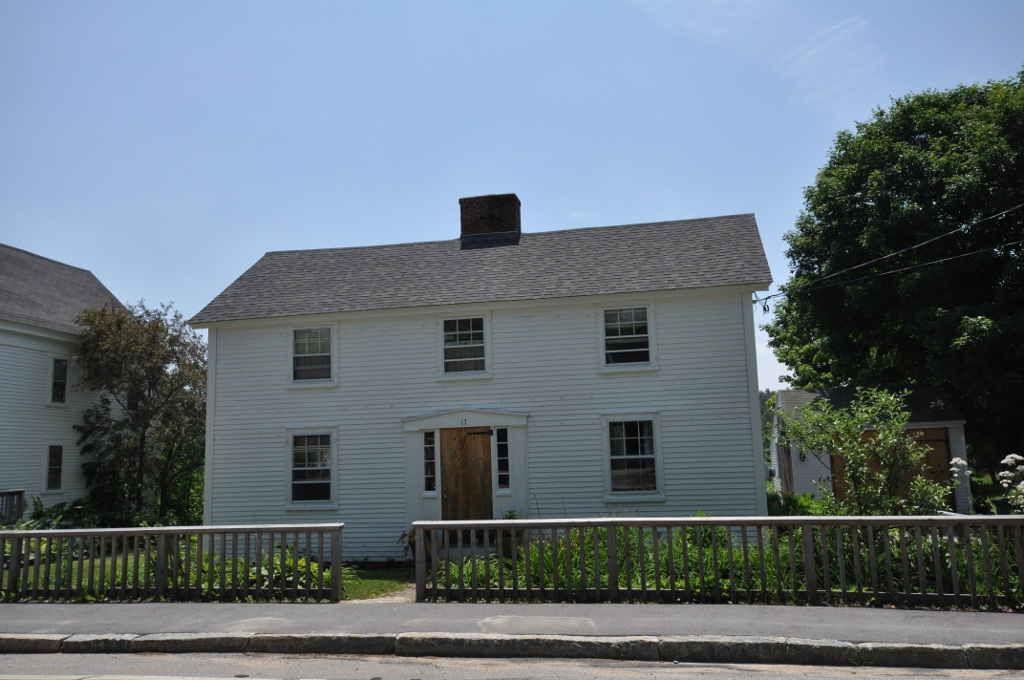

- Location within New Hampshire Location within the United States
- Location: Main St., Center Sandwich, New Hampshire
- Coordinates: 43°48′26″N 71°26′21″W
- Area: 0.2 acres (0.081 ha)
- Built: 1839
- Architectural style: Greek Revival
- Part of: Center Sandwich Historic District (ID83003997)
- NRHP reference No.: 83001131

Significant dates
- Added to NRHP: September 22, 1983
- Designated CP: December 22, 1983

Hansen's Annex is a historic house on Main Street in Center Sandwich, New Hampshire, United States. Built about 1839, it is one of a small number of Greek Revival buildings to survive, out of many that once graced the town. It has seen use as a single-family residence, tavern, and boarding house. It was listed on the National Register of Historic Places, and included in the Center Sandwich Historic District, in 1983.

== Description and history ==
Hansen's Annex stands in the village of Center Sandwich, on the south side of Main Street (New Hampshire Route 113) just west of its junction with New Hampshire Route 109. It is a two-story wood-frame house, three bays wide and a single room deep, with a side-gable roof. The front facade has a centered entry, with flanking sidelight windows and a slightly peaked entablature. A single-story ell extends behind the building, joining it to a 20th-century garage. The interior of the house is sparely finished, with beaded vertical planking on the walls.

The village of Center Sandwich experienced a significant flowering of architecture between 1830 and 1860, with a significant number of temple-fronted Greek Revival buildings constructed, including commercial and residential buildings. This assemblage was one of the finest such collections in New Hampshire's Lakes Region, but was largely lost in the late 19th and early 20th centuries to fire and demolition. This house is one of the few remaining buildings with Greek Revival features.

The house was built sometime before 1839, when its sale from Ezra Gould to John Folsom was recorded, and apparently served as a private residence at that time. By 1868 it was owned by George Hansen, who used the house and an attached barn (no longer extant) as a tavern and livery stable. Hansen's son Frank bought a house across the street, which he converted for use as a tenement, making this smaller house a functional annex to that property. In 1965 it was converted back to single-family use.

== See also ==
- National Register of Historic Places listings in Carroll County, New Hampshire
