= Chocorua Lake Basin Historic District =

Historic district in New Hampshire, United States

- U.S. National Register of Historic Places
- U.S. Historic district
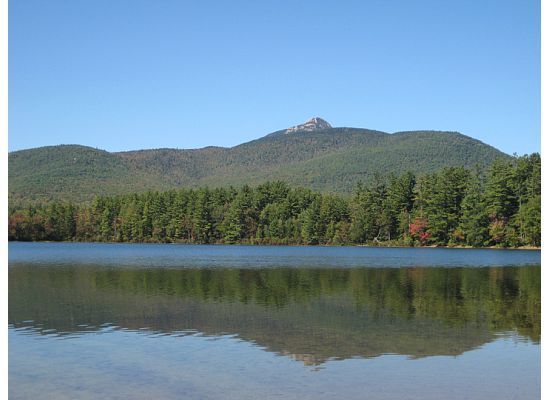
- Chocorua Lake

- Location within New Hampshire Location within the United States
- Location: Parts of NH 16, Chocorua Lake Rd., Philbrick Neighborhood, Fowles, Washington Hill Rds & Loring, MacGregor & Bolles Rd, Tamworth, New Hampshire
- Coordinates: 43°54′1″N 71°14′13″W
- Area: 6,130 acres (24.8 km^{2})
- Built: 1867
- Architect: multiple
- Architectural style: Shingle Style, Classical Revival, et al
- NRHP reference No.: 05000569
- Added to NRHP: June 9, 2005

The Chocorua Lake Basin Historic District is a large historic district surrounding Chocorua Lake in the town of Tamworth in New Hampshire, United States. It includes more than 6,000 acres (2,400 ha), with the lake roughly at its center, extending from Washington Hill Road in the east to Fowles Mill Road and Philbrick Neighborhood Road in the west, and from the town line with Albany in the north to Heavenly Hill Road in the south. The district's significance derives from a large cluster of late 19th and early 20th century summer resort houses built around and near the lake, and the role the area's landowners have played in the conservation of the lake and viewsheds associated with it and nearby Mount Chocorua. The district was listed on the National Register of Historic Places in 2005.

== Description and history ==
The area around Chocorua Lake in northeastern Tamworth was used primarily for agriculture in the first half of the 19th century, although some of the streams through the area had small mills sited on them. The first sign of interest in the region as a tourist area was in 1867. The Chocorua House, a local inn located on what is now New Hampshire Route 16 (and since lost to fire), was an early draw for tourists drawn to the scenic views of the lake and Mount Chocorua. Development of private properties as summer estates began in 1874, and was from an early date infused with a strong conservation ethic, dedicated mainly to the preservation of the lake. Charles Pickering Bowditch, a Harvard-educated Boston financier, purchased an old farmstead in 1879, and was instrumental in the acquisition for conservation of most of the lakeshore. Development was of a generally modest pace, first in the purchase and rehabilitation of old farm properties, and then in the construction of architect-designed summer houses. The community that arose was tightly knit, growing by word of mouth among friends and family, a trend that continued well into the 20th century.

Much of the land that is within the basin surrounding Chocorua Lake is protected either as conservation land, or by protective covenants controlling the future use of the property. Most of the properties are set well back on isolated lots, and now afford views primarily of Mount Chocorua. Views of the lake, which would have been possible due to the cleared nature of the landscape in the 19th century, have generally been lost due to natural reforestation of the area. There are about seventy residences in the historic district, of which fifty have historic character. Fifteen are based on farmsteads from the first half of the 19th century, which have in some cases been well-maintained to retain historic character. Later buildings are mostly in styles popular in the early 20th century: the Shingle style, Craftsman, and Colonial Revival. Architects who designed buildings in the district include Peabody and Stearns, Charles Adams Platt, and Charles Howard Walker; the latter was one of the area's summer residents.

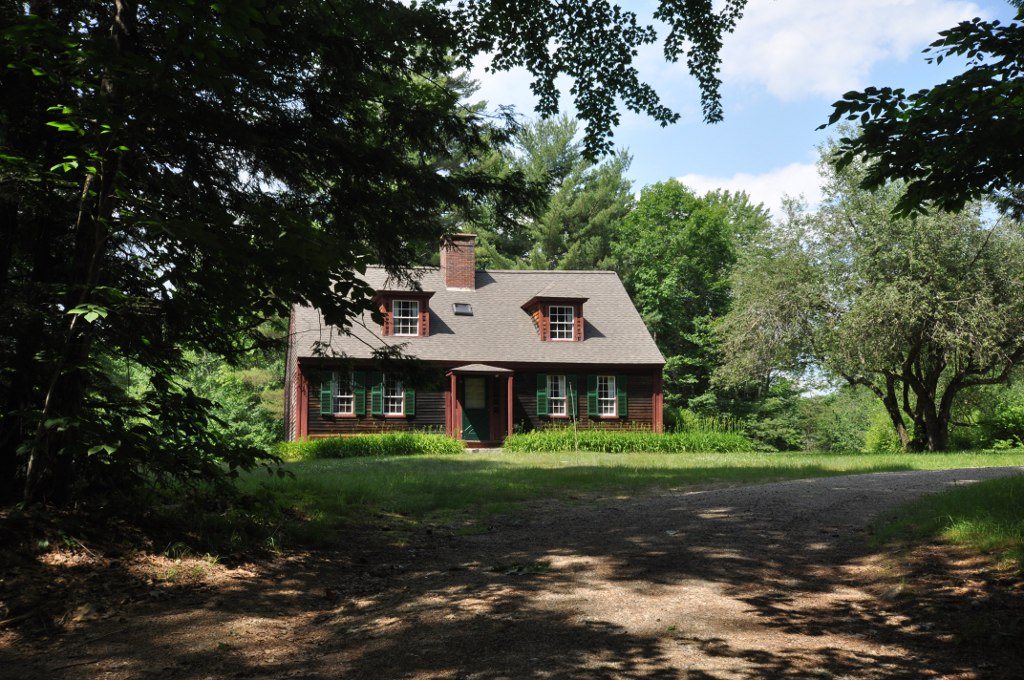
420 Chocorua Lake Road, c. 1791 house

== See also ==
- National Register of Historic Places listings in Carroll County, New Hampshire
