= Pointfield =

Historic house in New Hampshire, United States

- U.S. National Register of Historic Places
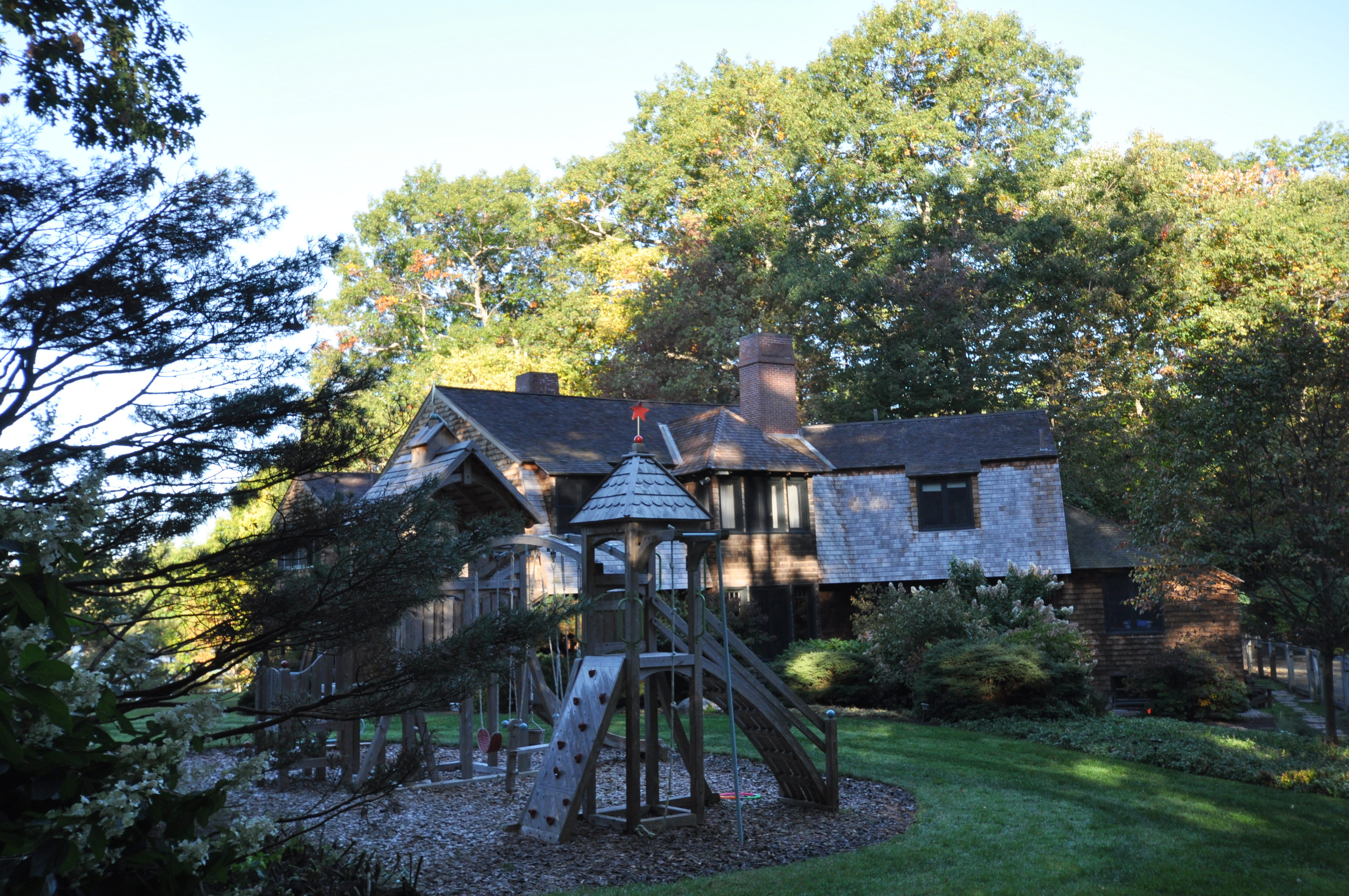

- Location within New Hampshire Location within the United States
- Location: 14 Sabine Point Road, Sandwich, New Hampshire
- Coordinates: 43°46′41″N 71°28′41″W
- Built: 1911
- Architect: J. Randolph Coolidge Jr.
- NRHP reference No.: 14000842
- Added to NRHP: October 8, 2014

Pointfield is a historic summer estate at 14 Sabine Point Road in Sandwich, New Hampshire. The main house was designed by J. Randolph Coolidge Jr. and built in 1911 for Natalie Whitwell, who was from a prominent Boston merchant family. The building has a V-shape with porches at the ends, affording all rooms views of Squam Lake, on whose shores it is located.

The property was listed on the National Register of Historic Places in 2014.

== See also ==
- National Register of Historic Places listings in Carroll County, New Hampshire
