= Tuftonboro United Methodist Church =

Historic church in New Hampshire, United States

- U.S. National Register of Historic Places
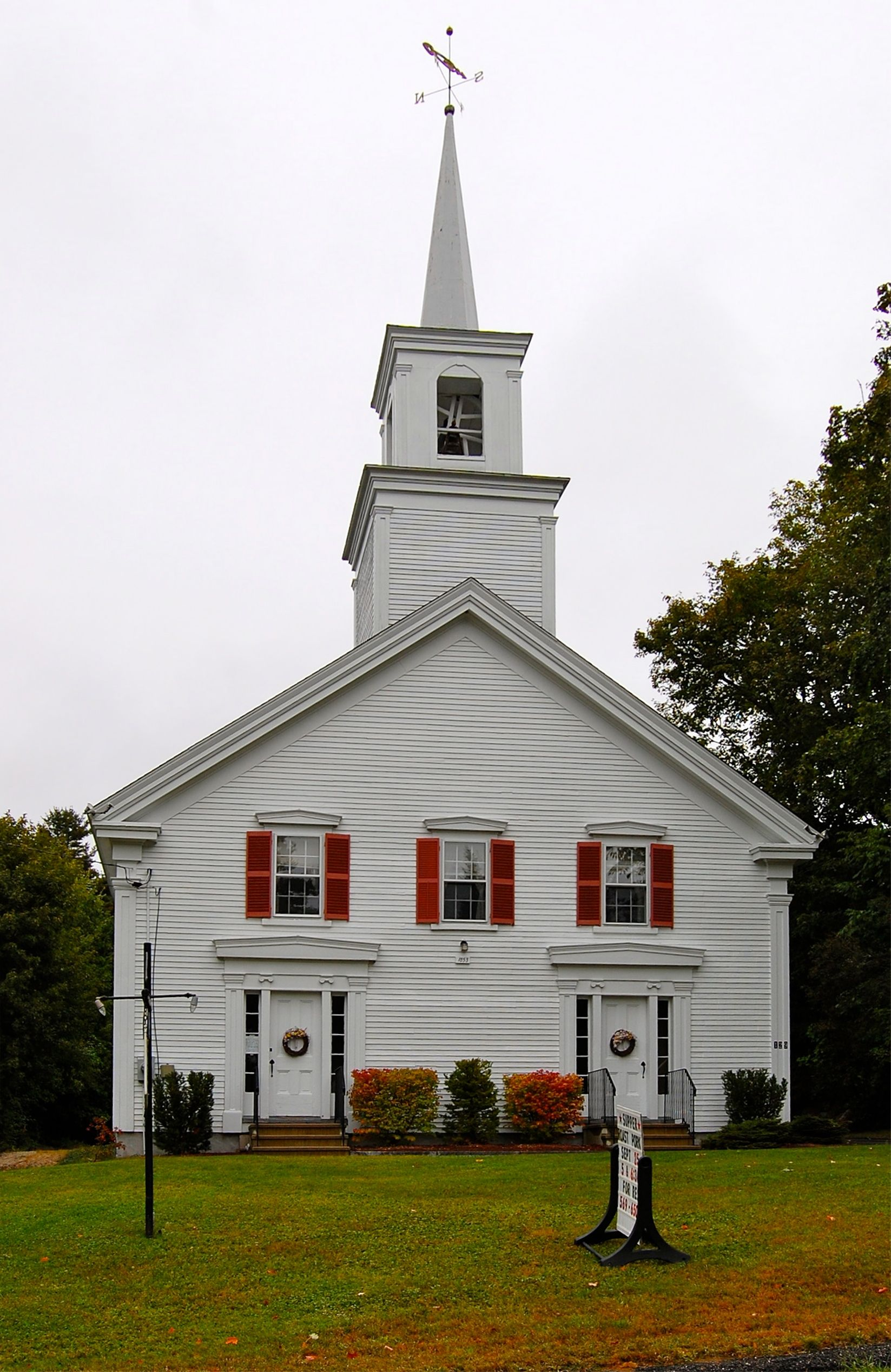
- Tuftonboro United Methodist Church

- Location within New Hampshire Location within the United States
- Location: N side of New Hampshire 171, E of jct. with Durgin Rd., Tuftonboro, New Hampshire
- Coordinates: 43°41′45″N 71°13′16″W
- Area: 0.8 acres (0.32 ha)
- Built: c.1853
- Architectural style: Greek Revival
- NRHP reference No.: 97000505
- Added to NRHP: June 16, 1997

Tuftonboro United Methodist Church is a historic Methodist church on New Hampshire Route 171 in Tuftonboro, New Hampshire, United States. Built about 1853, it is one of the finest examples of ecclesiastical Greek Revival architecture in New Hampshire's Lakes Region. It was added to the National Register of Historic Places in 1997.

== Description and history ==
The Tuftonboro United Methodist Church is located in the rural village center of Tuftonboro, on the north side of New Hampshire 171 a short way east of its junction with Durgin Road. It is a 2 1/2-story wood-frame structure, with a gabled roof and clapboarded exterior. A two-stage square tower rises from the roof ridge, with a plain first stage and a belfry stage topped by an octagonal spire. Both stages have pilastered corners and a corniced entablature; the belfry has rectangular openings topped by blind half round panels. The main facade is symmetrical, with a pair of entrances, each flanked by pilasters, sidelight windows, and outer pilasters, and topped by entablatures and peaked cornices. Windows on the second level also have peaked cornices.

Tuftonboro's Methodist congregation first met in 1804, and its first church building was constructed in 1820. The present building was erected sometime between 1849 and 1854; the congregation ascribes its construction to 1853. The church is more architecturally elaborate than other churches built in the Lakes Region in the mid-19th century.

== See also ==
- National Register of Historic Places listings in Carroll County, New Hampshire
