= First Free Will Baptist Church (Ossipee, New Hampshire) =

Historic church in New Hampshire, United States

- U.S. National Register of Historic Places
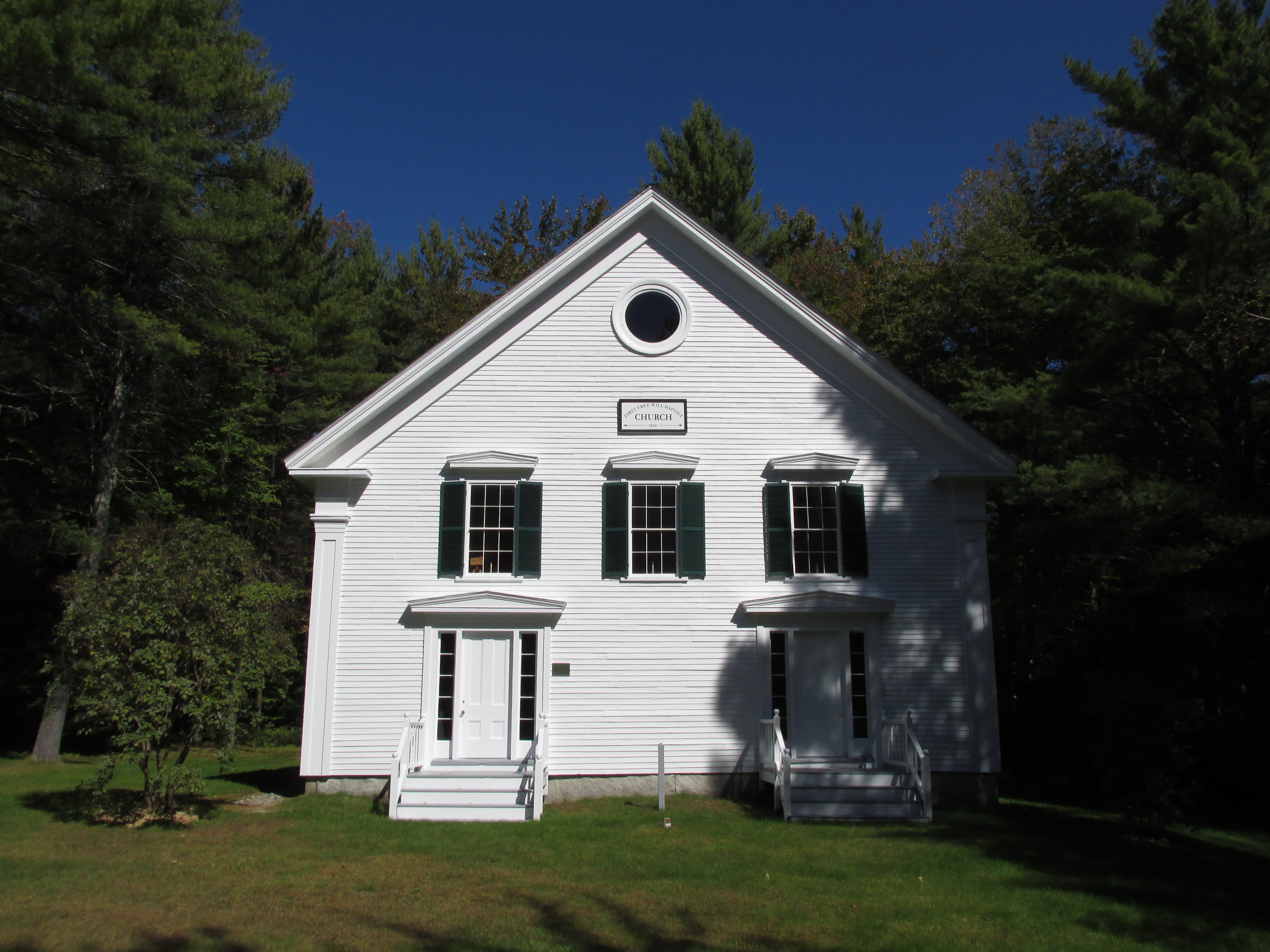
- First Free Will Baptist Church

- Location within New Hampshire Location within the United States
- Location: Granite Rd., Ossipee, New Hampshire
- Coordinates: 43°40′27″N 71°1′15″W
- Area: 0.3 acres (0.12 ha)
- Built: 1856
- Architect: Nutter, Joseph
- Architectural style: Greek Revival
- NRHP reference No.: 84002518
- Added to NRHP: March 15, 1984

The First Free Will Baptist Church is a historic church on Granite Road in Ossipee, New Hampshire. The wood-frame white clapboarded building was built in 1856–57, and is a fine little-altered local example of a vernacular Greek Revival country church. The building was listed on the National Register of Historic Places in 1984.

== Description and history ==
The First Free Will Baptist Church is located in far southeastern Ossipee, on the north side of Granite Road not far from the town line with Wakefield. It is a 2 1/2-story wood-frame structure, with a gabled roof and clapboarded exterior. It has simple but well-executed Greek Revival elements, including paneled corner pilasters and peaked lintels over the doors and windows. The main facade is symmetrical, with a pair of entrances on the ground floor and three windows in the gallery level above. The interior has separate vestibules for the two entrances, and stairs to a gallery level. Most of the building is filled by the main auditorium, which has slip pews and a raised platform at the far end.

The church was built in 1856-57 for a congregation of the Free Will Baptists that split from the town's first congregation, which met in the Early Settlers Meeting House at Leightons Corner. Construction of this building was supervised by Joseph Nutter, one of the parishioners. The building was actively used for services until about 1920. The building remains in the hands of the society originally established for its upkeep, and has seen only modest alterations, such as the introduction of electric lighting.

== See also ==
- National Register of Historic Places listings in Carroll County, New Hampshire
