= Early Settlers Meeting House =

Historic church in New Hampshire, United States

- U.S. National Register of Historic Places
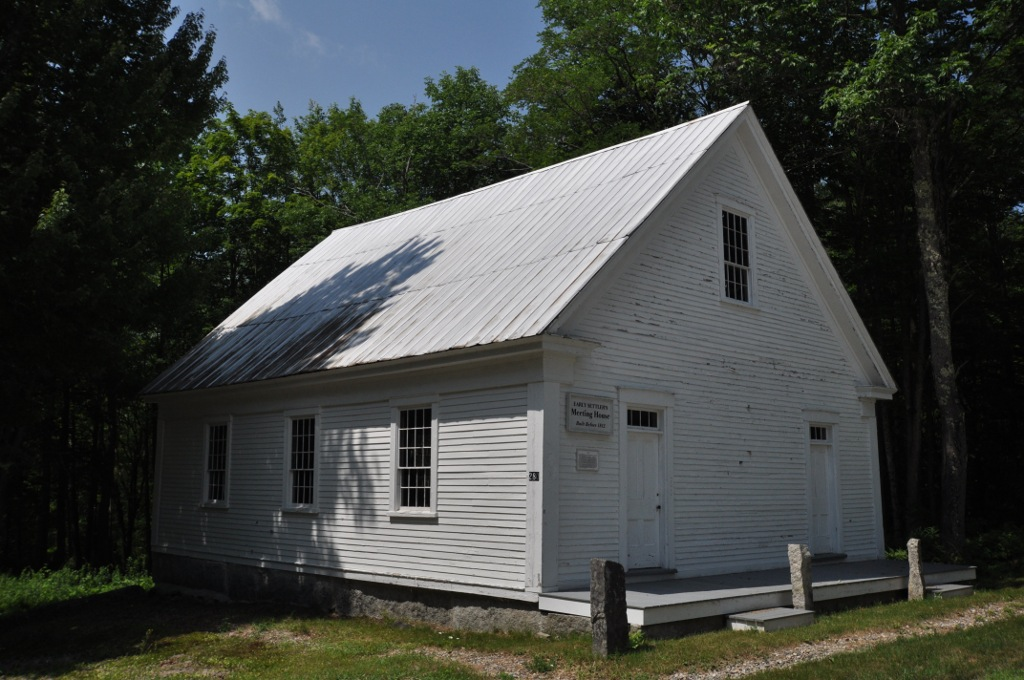

- Location within New Hampshire Location within the United States
- Location: Jct. of Granite and Foggs Ridge Rds., Leighton Corners, Town of Ossipee, New Hampshire
- Coordinates: 43°40′44″N 71°1′44″W
- Area: less than one acre
- Built: 1856
- Architectural style: Greek Revival
- NRHP reference No.: 95000680
- Added to NRHP: June 12, 1995

The Early Settlers Meeting House is a historic church building at the junction of Granite and Foggs Ridge roads at Leighton Corners in the town of Ossipee, New Hampshire, United States. Built in the 1810s for a Free Will Baptist congregation and remodeled in 1856, it is a well-preserved example of a vernacular mid-19th century church. Now owned by the Ossipee Historical Society, the building was listed on the National Register of Historic Places in 1995.

== Description and history ==
The Early Settlers Meeting House is located in a rural area of southeastern Ossipee, at the southwest corner of Foggs Ridge Road and Granite Road. It is a vernacular, 1 1/2-story clapboarded wood-frame building set on a fieldstone foundation. The main facade, facing Granite Road, is symmetrical, with a pair of entrances on the main floor and a window in the gable above. The entrances are each framed by simple surrounds and topped by transom windows. An open platform extends across the width of the building in front of that facade, set on granite blocks and fronted by a series of granite posts. The building corners have wide corner boards, rising to frieze boards extending along the sides. Each side has three sash windows.

The church was built sometime between 1809 and 1812, and was the first Free Will Baptist church in the town. Its entrance was originally at the center of the east facade (facing Fogg Ridge Road), and its interior was filled with box pews. Doctrinal disagreements led to a split in the congregation in the 1850s, with one branch departing to a new church elsewhere on Granite Road. The other group remained here, and undertook a restyling of this building, which was then in need of maintenance. The interior was updated with bench pews and a new pulpit area, and the exterior was altered, replacing the entrance with a window and building the present entrances. By the early 20th century the congregation had declined, and the building was sold to the Ossipee Historical Society in 1928.

== See also ==
- National Register of Historic Places listings in Carroll County, New Hampshire
