= Union Hotel (Wakefield, New Hampshire) =

- U.S. National Register of Historic Places
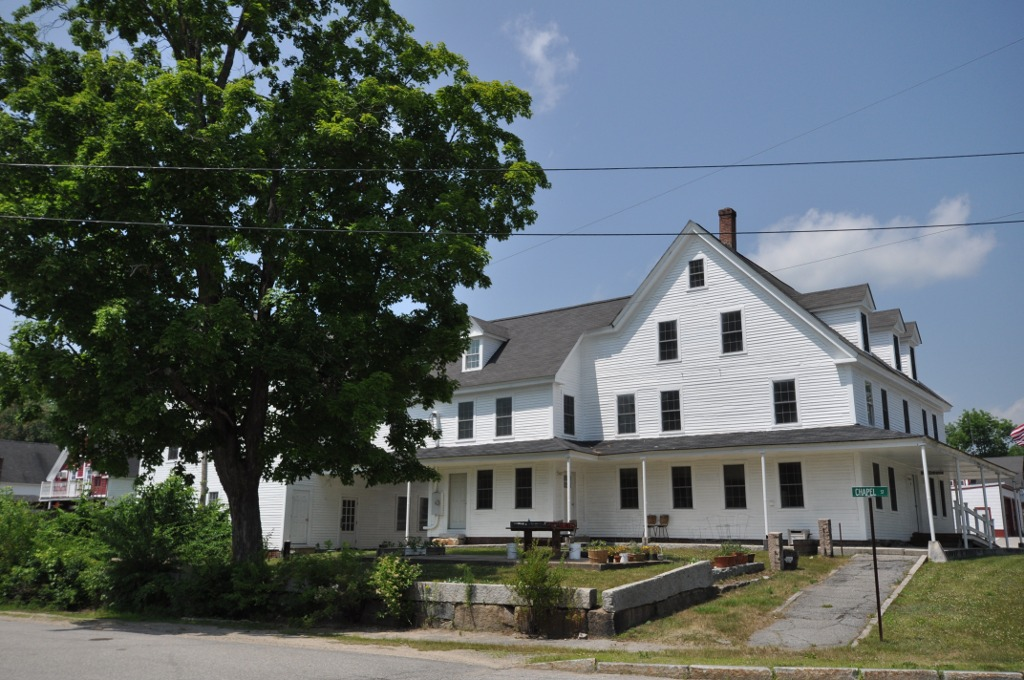

- Location within New Hampshire Location within the United States
- Location: 254 Main St., Wakefield, New Hampshire
- Coordinates: 43°29′32″N 71°1′29″W
- Area: 0.7 acres (0.28 ha)
- Built: 1855
- NRHP reference No.: 89002055
- Added to NRHP: December 1, 1989

The Union Hotel is a historic hotel building at 254 Main Street in the Union village of Wakefield, New Hampshire. Built in 1855 and repeatedly enlarged, it is one of only two surviving 19th-century railroad hotels in the town. It was operated until 1960, and for many years housed the local VFW post. The building was listed on the National Register of Historic Places in 1989. It is now home to the Greater Wakefield Resource Center.

== Description and history ==
The Union Hotel is located in southernmost Wakefield, in the village of Union at the northwest corner of Main and Church streets. It is a complex of connected wood-frame structures, most 2 1/2 stories in height and covered in wooden clapboards. It consists of a main block and several wings, which primarily housed hotel rooms.

Rooms are arranged around a central courtyard and connected by covered passages. An open single-story porch extends across the front and around to both sides, with a hip roof supported by round metal posts. The interior of the public spaces have a mix of old and modern finishes, from original marble parquet flooring to linoleum.

The 2 1/2-story wood-frame building was built in 1855 by Robert Pike, who operated the hotel until his death in 1916. It was then operated by other owners until financial reverses led to a bank foreclosure in 1961. The local VFW post purchased the building in 1966. Most recently, the building has been acquired and restored by the Greater Wakefield Resource Center, a non-profit umbrella organization.

The building is one of only three hotel buildings that were purpose-built after the arrival of the railroad in the area, at a time when the Union village in southern Wakefield was its northern terminus. For seventeen years, Union had the only railroad station in all of Carroll County, making it a key transportation junction for the region.

== See also ==
- National Register of Historic Places listings in Carroll County, New Hampshire
