= Bradbury Jewell House =

Historic house in New Hampshire, United States

- U.S. National Register of Historic Places
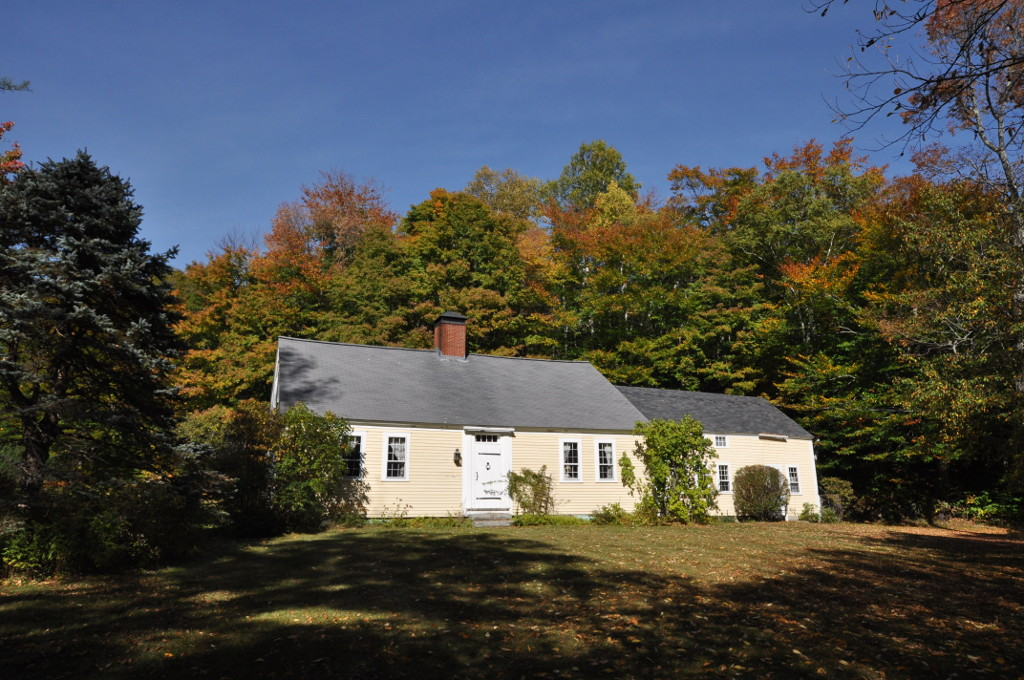

- Location within New Hampshire Location within the United States
- Location: 154 Ferncroft Rd., Sandwich, New Hampshire
- Coordinates: 43°54′51″N 71°21′45″W
- Area: 10 acres (4.0 ha)
- Built: 1802
- Built by: Jewell, Bradbury
- NRHP reference No.: 86002792
- Added to NRHP: August 27, 1986

The Bradbury Jewell House is a historic house at 154 Ferncroft Road in Sandwich, New Hampshire. Built about 1802 by an early surveyor of the region, it is a well-preserved example of high-quality second-generation frontier architecture. It was listed on the National Register of Historic Places in 1986.

== Description and history ==
The Bradbury Jewell House stands near the end of Ferncroft Road in the remote northeastern corner of Sandwich; this area is only accessible via Tamworth, and is bordered on the north by the White Mountain National Forest. The house stands in a clearing on the north side of the road, opposite Squirrel Bridge Road, a private lane. The house is fairly small (30' by 40'), five bays wide, 1 1/2 stories in height, with a central chimney. There is a small gable-roofed ell attached to the east side of the house. Its central entry is flanked by sidelight windows; the house otherwise has vernacular styling, but is remarkably little changed since its construction. The property includes a barn built in 1805, and a garden shed built c. 1975.

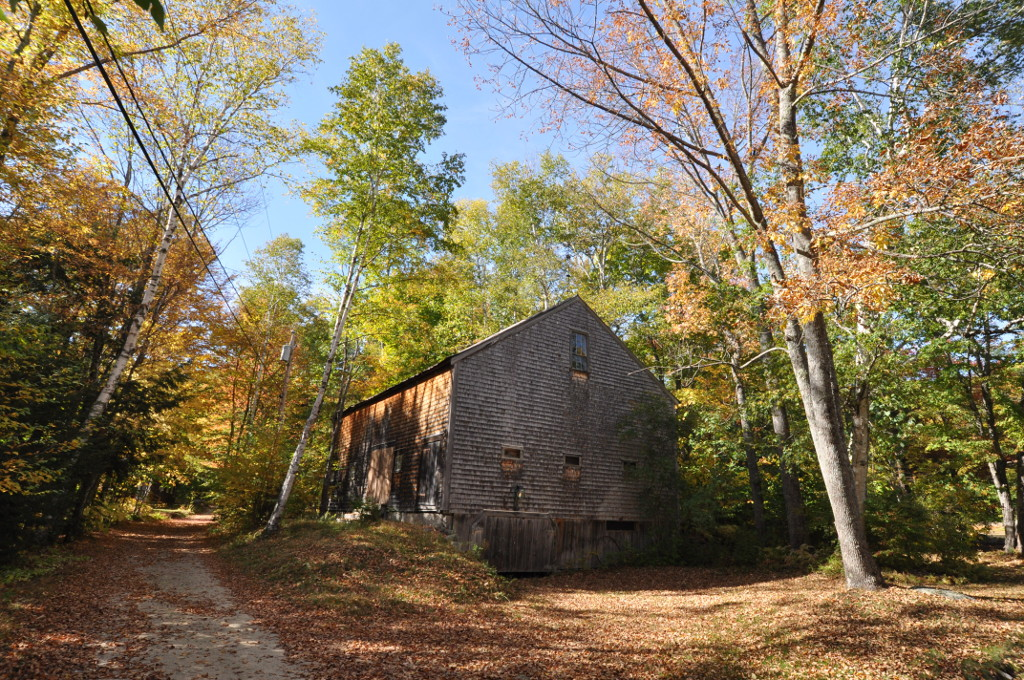
The barn

Bradbury Jewell was a surveyor hired by a Sandwich landowner in 1768 to survey the Ferncroft area. In 1780 he settled in what is now Tamworth, where he built the first frame house, but moved to the New Hampshire coast a few years later. He returned to Sandwich in 1802, and had by the following year built this house. Its relatively modest styling is reflective of the frontier nature of the property, but also shows evidence in its interior features of more sophisticated architectural knowledge Jewell would have acquired during his years on the coast. Jewell is known to have business dealings with John Langdon, whose 1786 house is one of the most sophisticated houses of the period in Portsmouth.

== See also ==
- National Register of Historic Places listings in Carroll County, New Hampshire
