= Cotton Mountain Community Church =

Historic church in New Hampshire, United States

- U.S. National Register of Historic Places
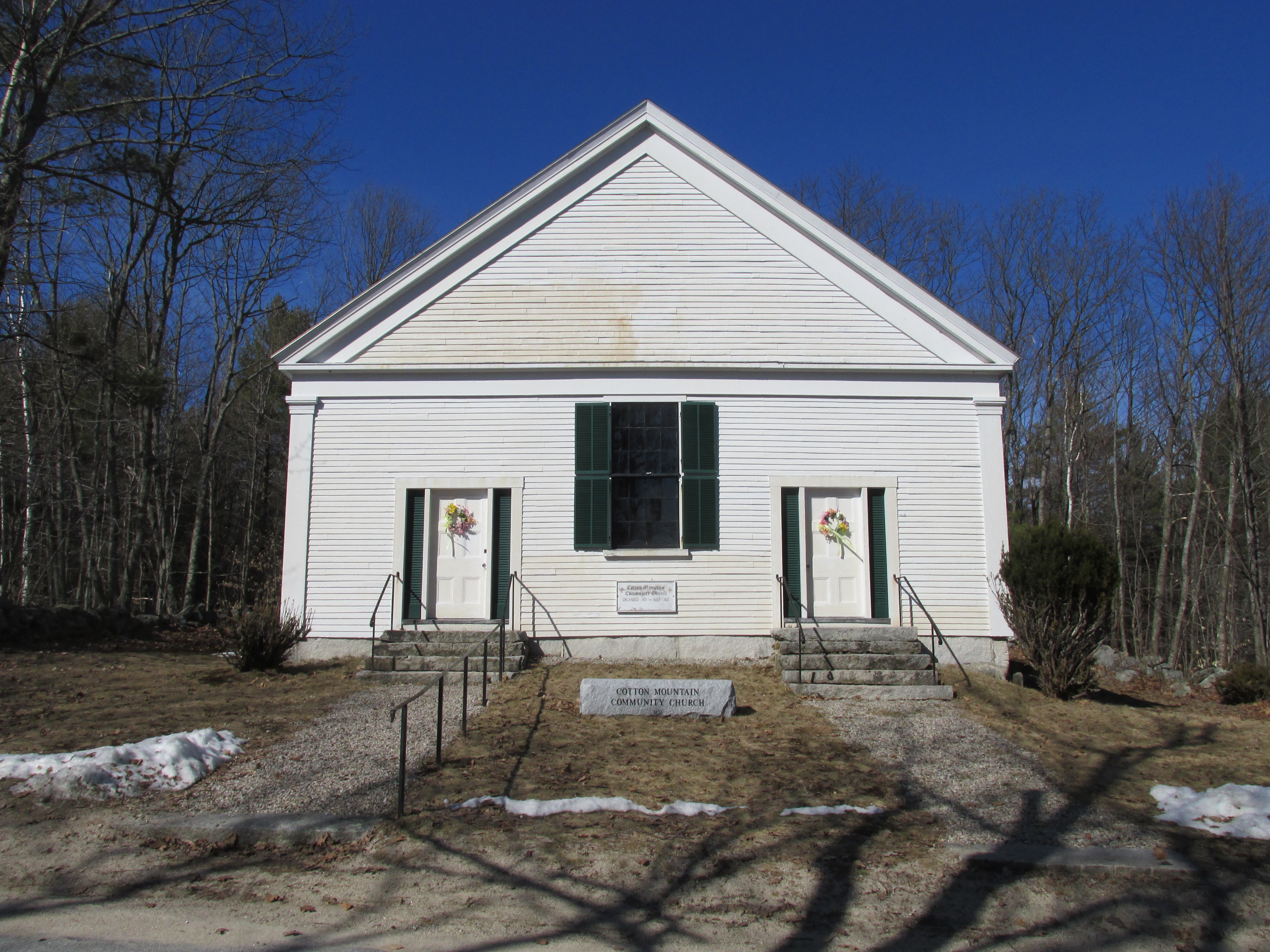
- Cotton Mountain Community Church

- Location within New Hampshire Location within the United States
- Location: Stoneham Rd., Wolfeboro, New Hampshire
- Coordinates: 43°36′52″N 71°5′11″W
- Area: 0.1 acres (0.040 ha)
- Built: 1852
- Architectural style: Greek Revival, Vernacular Greek Revival
- NRHP reference No.: 85000475
- Added to NRHP: March 07, 1985

The Cotton Mountain Community Church, also known as the Wolfeborough, Brookfield and Wakefield Meetinghouse, is a historic church on Stoneham Road in Wolfeboro, New Hampshire, near the town line with Brookfield. Built about 1852, it is a well-preserved example of a rural New England meeting house with vernacular Greek Revival style. The building was listed on the National Register of Historic Places in 1985. Since 1957, when it stopped being used for services, it has been cared for by a local nonprofit group.

== Description and history ==
The Cotton Mountain Community Church stands alone in a rural wooded area in far eastern Wolfeboro, on the north side of Stoneham Road a short way west of the town border with Brookfield. It is a single-story wood-frame structure, with a gabled roof, clapboarded exterior, and granite foundation. The building corners are pilastered, which rise to a simple entablature. The front gable is fully pedimented. The front facade is symmetrical, with a pair of entrances flanking a central window. Each entrance is flanked by sidelight windows and framed by plain trim. The entrances lead into separate small vestibules, which give way to a single large chamber. Interior lighting is provided by kerosene lamps and chandelier, and the space is lined with bench pews facing a raised pulpit area.

The church was built about 1852 to serve local Methodist and Free Will Baptist congregations. It escaped major renovations in part because enrollments declined over the next 100 years; its only major alterations have been the replacement of a high pulpit with the present low platform, and the addition of the kerosene chandelier, both in 1901. Its congregations continued to decline, and were eventually absorbed into other area churches. The building was sold in 1957 to the Cotton Mountain Community Church Association, dedicated to its preservation.

== See also ==
- National Register of Historic Places listings in Carroll County, New Hampshire
