= North Sandwich Meeting House =

Historic church in New Hampshire, United States

- U.S. National Register of Historic Places
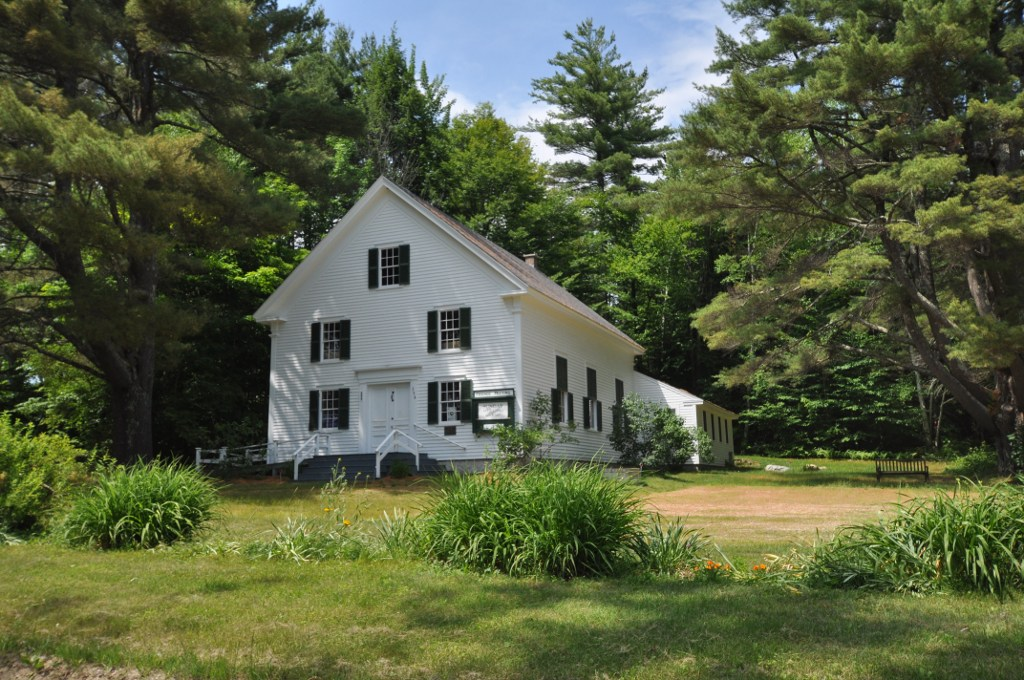

- Location within New Hampshire Location within the United States
- Nearest city: Quaker-Whiteface and Brown Hill Rds., Sandwich, New Hampshire
- Coordinates: 43°51′41″N 71°21′58″W
- Area: 0.5 acres (0.20 ha)
- Built: 1881
- Built by: Quinby, William F.
- Architectural style: Quaker plain style
- NRHP reference No.: 86001230
- Added to NRHP: June 5, 1986

The North Sandwich Meeting House is a historic Quaker meeting house at the northwest junction of Quaker-Whiteface Road and Brown Hill Road in Sandwich, New Hampshire. Built in 1881, it is the best-preserved 19th-century Quaker meeting house in the county. The building was listed on the National Register of Historic Places in 1986, at which time it was the only active Quaker meeting house in Carroll County.

The North Sandwich Society of Friends has a silent (unprogrammed) meeting for worship each Sunday from 10 a.m. to 11 a.m. at the meeting house.

== Description and history ==
The North Sandwich Meeting House is located in a rural area of northeastern Sandwich, at the northwest corner of Quaker-Whiteface and Brown Hill Roads. It is a single-story wood-frame building, with a gable roof and simple pilastered cornerboards. The interior consists of a vestibule area, which leads into the main hall and has stairs leading up to a balcony. The only significant exterior changes are the addition of a bulletin board, and the granite front steps and platform, which appear to date to the 1920s. Interior changes are also modest: two pews have been removed, one to provide space for an organ, and another for a more modern heating system. The auditorium was also carpeted at some point.

The Sandwich Society of Friends (i.e. Quakers) was organized in 1783. In 1802, this society was made a monthly meeting, with separate meetings for southern and northern Sandwich. The first meetinghouse for the north meeting was built on this site in 1814. Both congregations declined in the mid-19th century, with the southern one disbanding in 1884. The north meeting was revitalized in 1876, and the present building was built to replace the deteriorating first building. Unlike the two other surviving Quaker meeting houses in the county, it is very little changed.

== See also ==
- National Register of Historic Places listings in Carroll County, New Hampshire
