= White Meetinghouse =

Historic church in New Hampshire, United States

- U.S. National Register of Historic Places
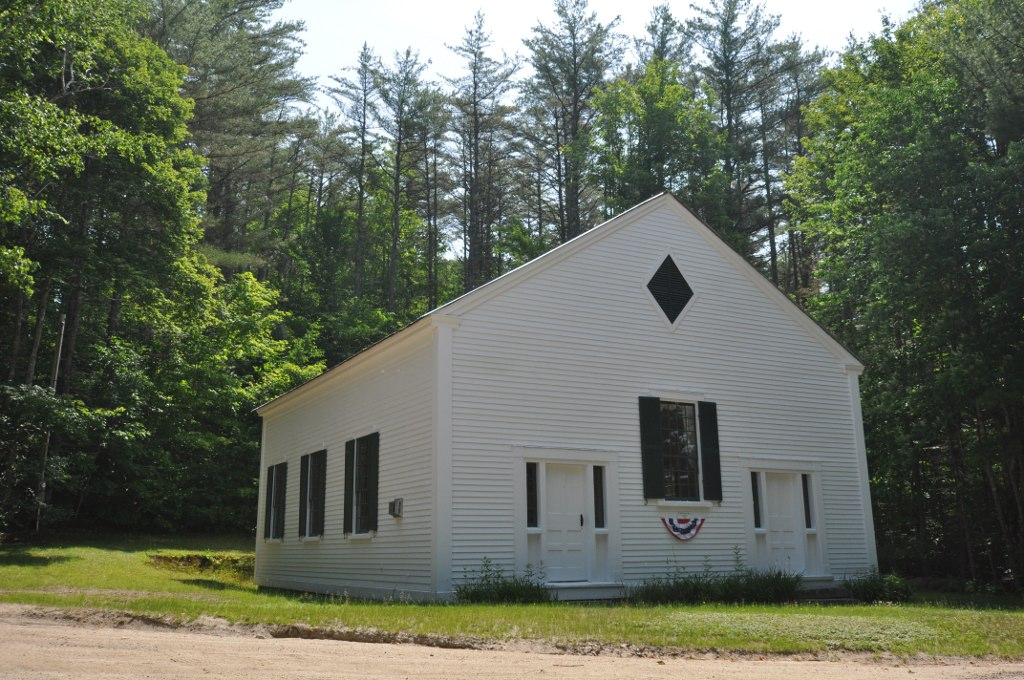

- Location within New Hampshire Location within the United States
- Location: Towle Hill Rd., Eaton, New Hampshire
- Coordinates: 43°51′31″N 71°4′30″W
- Area: 0.4 acres (0.16 ha)
- Built: 1844
- Architect: Allard, Stephen
- Architectural style: Greek Revival
- NRHP reference No.: 80000274
- Added to NRHP: May 15, 1980

The White Meetinghouse, also known as the First Freewill Baptist Society Meetinghouse, is a historic meeting house on Towle Hill Road, south of Eaton Center, New Hampshire. Built in 1844, it is a well-preserved and little-altered example of a vernacular Greek Revival meeting house. The building was listed on the National Register of Historic Places in 1980. The building is now maintained by a local community organization, and is used for community events and occasional services.

== Description and history ==
The White Meetinghouse stands in an isolated rural setting in southwestern Eaton, at the southeast corner of Towle Corner Road and Burnham Road. It is a single story wood-frame building, with a gable roof and clapboarded exterior. The main facade is relatively plain in decoration, with a pair of entry doors framed by sidelights and unmoulded casings. The doorways lead into separate small vestibules, which provide entry to the main chamber. The auditorium is oriented with slip pews facing the front of the building, with two tiers of raised pews in the rear for the choir. The pews are original, and bear the numbers of the subscribers who funded the building's construction. The building has never been wired for electricity, and is heated by a wood stove with a winding funnel pipe leading to the chimney.

The meetinghouse was erected in 1844 for a congregation of Free Will Baptists. It was built by Stephen Allard, a local builder who is credited with a number of surviving buildings in the community. The congregation peaked in size around the time of the American Civil War, and declined thereafter. The congregation was disbanded in the 1930s.

== See also ==
- National Register of Historic Places listings in Carroll County, New Hampshire
