= Conway Public Library =

- U.S. National Register of Historic Places
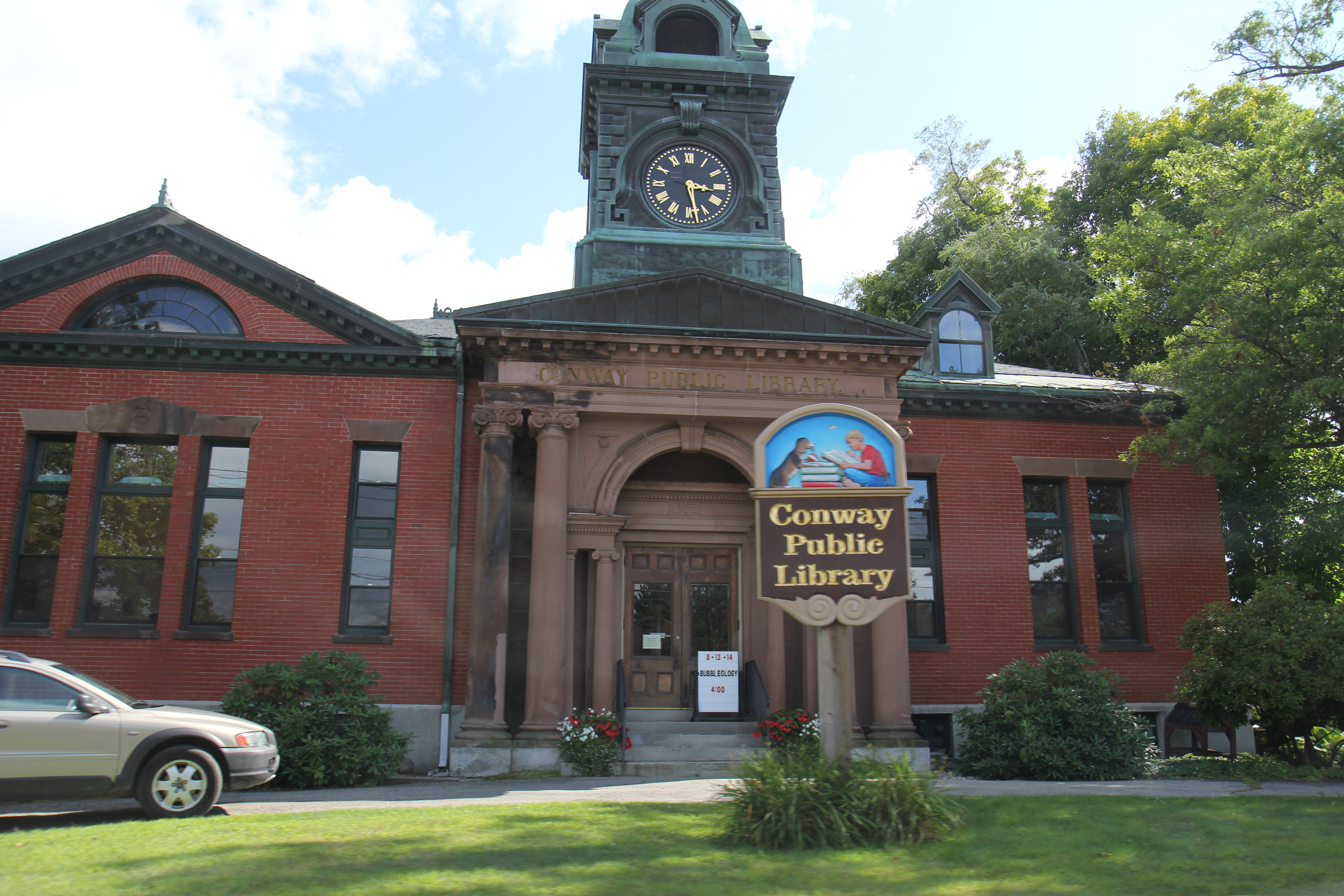

- Location within New Hampshire Location within the United States
- Location: 15 Greenwood Ave., Conway, New Hampshire
- Coordinates: 43°58′43″N 71°7′2″W
- Area: less than one acre
- Built: 1900
- Architect: Thomas Silloway
- Architectural style: Classical Revival
- NRHP reference No.: 100001317
- Added to NRHP: September 8, 1983

The Conway Public Library serves the town of Conway, New Hampshire. It is located at 15 Greenwood Avenue in Conway village, in an architecturally distinguished Classical Revival building built in 1900 as a gift to the town from Sarah and Lydia Jenks. The building was listed on the National Register of Historic Places in 2017.

== Services ==
The Conway Public Library offers a collection of books and other media for lending to residents of Conway and Albany, as well as educators and students at area schools. It provides a community meeting space for small organizations, and offers access to the internet and select online databases. It has special collections on local history.

== Architecture and history ==
The Conway Public Library occupies a prominent position in Conway's central village, facing north toward Main Street (New Hampshire Route 113) at its junction with New Hampshire Route 16. It is a two-story structure, built out of brick and stone, with Classical Revival features. The traditional main entrance is sheltered by a projecting brownstone portico, and a clocktower with a four-face clock and a copper dome. A modern addition extends east of the original building. The interior of the original building retains many period features, including quarter-sawn oak wainscoting and stained glass windows.

The library was founded in 1895 by the Conway Women's Club, and the present building was constructed in 1900. It was designed by Thomas Silloway, better known for his many churches and the Vermont State House, and may be his only library design. The clock in the tower was provided by George M. Stevens. The building was a gift of Lydia and Sarah Jenks, in honor of Lydia's late husband Thomas, a prominent local doctor who bequeathed funds for its establishment.

== See also ==
- National Register of Historic Places listings in Carroll County, New Hampshire
