= Eagle Mountain House =

- U.S. National Register of Historic Places
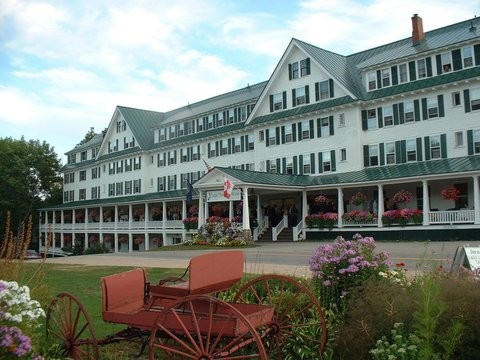

- Location within New Hampshire Location within the United States
- Location: 179 Carter Notch Rd., N of jct. with NH 16A, Jackson, New Hampshire
- Coordinates: 44°9′23″N 71°11′10″W
- Area: 10 acres (4.0 ha)
- Built: 1916
- Built by: Roswell Ward
- Architect: Arthur Pinkham Gale
- Architectural style: Colonial Revival
- NRHP reference No.: 90001848
- Added to NRHP: December 6, 1990

Eagle Mountain House is a historic resort hotel at 179 Carter Notch Road in Jackson, New Hampshire. Built in 1916 and enlarged in 1929, it is one of the few surviving grand mountain resort hotels in the White Mountains of New Hampshire. The hotel is currently a member of Historic Hotels of America, the official program of the National Trust for Historic Preservation. It was listed on the National Register of Historic Places in 1990.

== Description and history ==
Eagle Mountain House stands close to the west side of Carter Notch Road (New Hampshire Route 16B), north of Jackson Village. It is set on the west side of a valley, with Eagle Mountain behind it and Black Mountain across the valley to the east. It is a large 3 1/2-story wood-frame structure, with a basically U-shaped plan, with the base of the U parallel to the road and its legs extending to the west. It is covered by a gabled roof studded with both pedimented gable dormers and shed-roof dormers. Some of the upper-level windows have original diamond-pane sashes. A single-story porch, 220 feet (67 m) long, extends across the front, becoming two stories at the left end where the ground slopes away. The interior public spaces retain original finishes and features, including a working 1926 elevator.

The town of Jackson had by the 1840s developed a reputation as an artists colony, for the rugged scenery of the area. Tourism in the area expanded significantly with the arrival in the 1850s of the railroad at nearby Glen. By the 1880s Jackson had five large hotels, one of which was Eagle Mountain House. It was established in 1849 by Cyrus and Marcia Pinkham Gale, on land first settled by her ancestor, Captain Joseph Pinkham. Originally little more than a farmhouse, it was expanded to house as many as 125 guests before it was destroyed by fire in 1915.

The oldest portion of the present building was built in 1916 at the direction of the Gales' son, Arthur Pinkham Gale, who also drew the preliminary plans for the building. Construction was by Intervale contractor Roswell Ward. It is one of five remaining large-scale resort hotels built in the late 19th and early 20th century in New Hampshire, and the only one of five such hotels that was built in Jackson. It was doubled in size by an addition in 1929, and was fitted with the latest in modern amenities, including steam heat and an elevator. The hotel remained in the Gale family until 1973.

== See also ==
- National Register of Historic Places listings in Carroll County, New Hampshire
