= Fore Point =

Historic house in New Hampshire, United States

- U.S. National Register of Historic Places
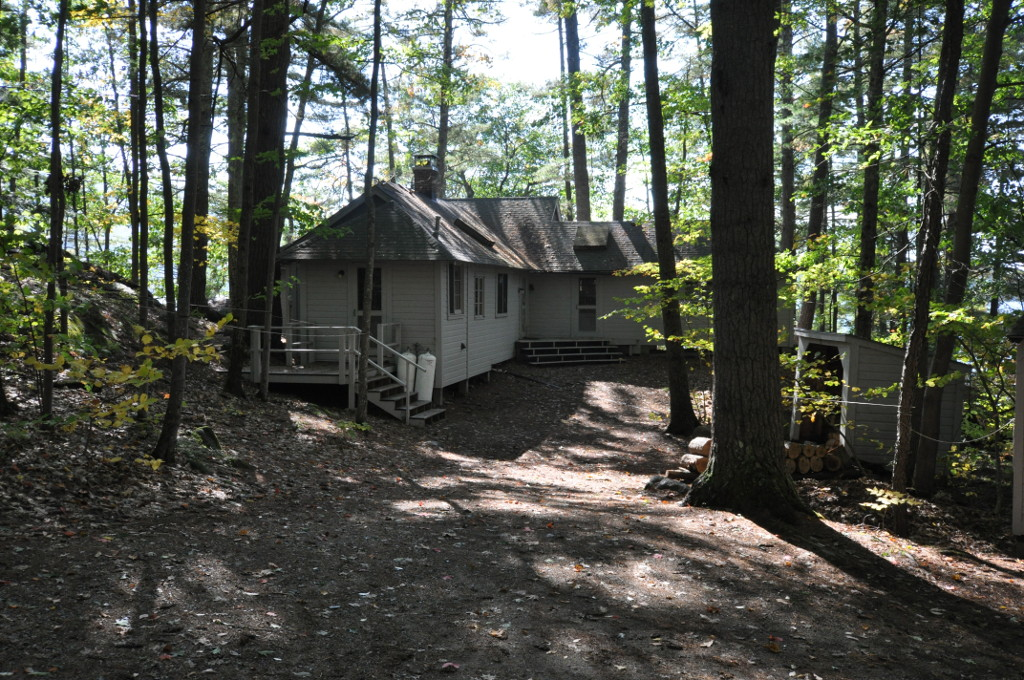
- Location: Address restricted Sandwich, New Hampshire
- Area: 17 acres (6.9 ha)
- Built: 1953
- Architectural style: Mid-Century Modern
- NRHP reference No.: 100000475
- Added to NRHP: January 17, 2017

Fore Point is a historic private summer lakefront estate on the shore of Squam Lake in Sandwich, New Hampshire. The 17-acre (6.9 ha) property includes a main house, guest house, bunkhouse, and boathouse, designed and built by Julius Smith, a local builder, in 1953. They camp was built for Victoria Tytus, widow of a member of the locally prominent Coolidge family, who own other summer properties in the vicinity. Despite its Mid-Century Modern styling, it bears a strong organizational resemblance to much older camps on Squam Lake.

The property was listed on the National Register of Historic Places in 2017.

== See also ==
- National Register of Historic Places listings in Carroll County, New Hampshire
