= Lower Corner Historic District =

Historic district in New Hampshire, United States

- U.S. National Register of Historic Places
- U.S. Historic district
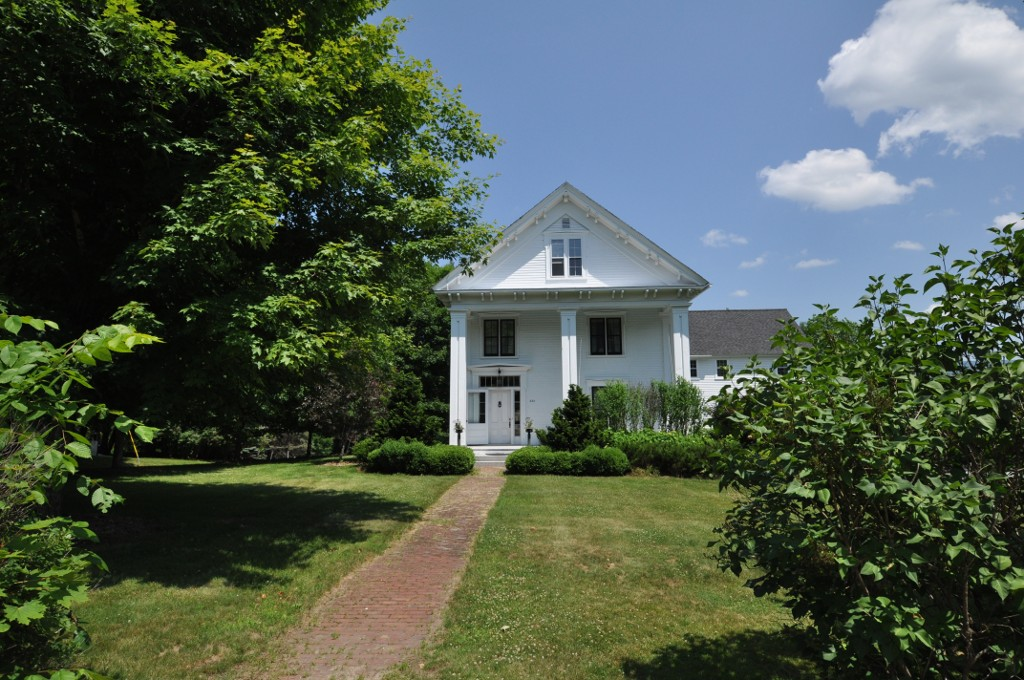
- William Weed House

- Location within New Hampshire Location within the United States
- Location: NH 109, Sandwich, New Hampshire
- Coordinates: 43°47′32″N 71°24′49″W
- Area: 41 acres (17 ha)
- Architectural style: Greek Revival
- NRHP reference No.: 86003380
- Added to NRHP: December 1, 1986

The Lower Corner Historic District encompasses a small village center in the town of Sandwich, New Hampshire. Lower Corner is a rural village that is strung along New Hampshire Route 109 on either side of its junction with School House Road, about one mile from the main village of Center Sandwich. The village was developed relatively early in Sandwich's history, although its oldest buildings now date to the early 19th century. There are 25 contributing structures, mostly residences. There are two buildings built as stores, including one of brick; all the other buildings are wood frame. The district was listed on the National Register of Historic Places in 1986.

The town of Sandwich was first settled by Daniel Beede in the early 1770s, when he built a log cabin near Lower Corner. The village grew quickly, and was the site of Sandwich's first town meeting in 1772. By 1812 it was a prosperous country village, and was given the town's first post office. It was also the site of the town's first academy and congregational church, neither of which survive. The oldest buildings that survive date to the 1810s, and include a former tavern and a modest Cape style house. The Brick Store was built in 1845, and features ornate Italianate detailing, while the Wentworth Store, built in the 1830s, boasts more modest Greek Revival styling.

The Greek Revival is the most common form of architectural expression in the district. Two house have full high-style Greek temple fronts, with two-story columns supporting a full-pedimented gable. One of these, the William Weed house, was probably one of the fanciest houses in town at the time of its construction c. 1850. It was eclipsed, however, by Chestnut Manor, located at the top of the hill. Built by Isaac Adams, a local who made a fortune in Boston, Massachusetts, it stands out because of its prominent location and its three-story tower, which is topped by a pyramidal slate roof and globe finial.

== See also ==
- National Register of Historic Places listings in Carroll County, New Hampshire
