= National Register of Historic Places listings in Carroll County, New Hampshire =

Location of Carroll County in New Hampshire

This is a list of the National Register of Historic Places listings in Carroll County, New Hampshire.

This is intended to be a complete list of the properties and districts on the National Register of Historic Places in Carroll County, New Hampshire, United States. Latitude and longitude coordinates are provided for many National Register properties and districts; these locations may be seen together in a map.

There are 61 properties and districts listed on the National Register in the county, including two National Historic Landmarks.

Contents: Counties in New Hampshire
Belknap - Carroll - Cheshire - Coös - Grafton - Hillsborough - Merrimack - Rockingham - Strafford - Sullivan

This National Park Service list is complete through NPS recent listings posted September 25, 2026.

== Current listings ==
	Name on the Register	Image	Date listed	Location	City or town	Description
1	Abenaki Indian Shop and Camp	Abenaki Indian Shop and Camp	February 28, 1991 (#91000218)	Intervale Crossroad, 1 mi (1.6 km) east of NH 16; 44°04′28″N 71°08′11″W	Conway	Now a town park.
2	Bald Peak Colony Club		December 8, 2023 (#100009636)	180 Bald Peak Drive; 43°41′49″N 71°19′39″W	Moultonborough	
3	Bartlett Roundhouse	Bartlett Roundhouse	September 29, 2015 (#15000664)	S. of US 302 between Pine St. & Albany Ave. 44°04′36″N 71°17′15″W	Bartlett	
4	Beede Farm	Beede Farm	August 15, 2012 (#12000502)	178 Mill Bridge Rd. 43°47′38″N 71°28′40″W	Sandwich	Part of the Squam MPS (Note: For additional properties that are part of the Squam MPS see National Register of Historic Places listings in Grafton County, New Hampshire.)
5	Bolduc Block	Bolduc Block	September 20, 2016 (#16000642)	36 Main St. 43°58′44″N 71°07′12″W	Conway	
6	Brewster Memorial Hall	Brewster Memorial Hall	September 8, 1983 (#83001129)	S. Main and Union Sts. 43°35′05″N 71°12′37″W	Wolfeboro	
7	Brookfield Town Hall	Brookfield Town Hall	June 6, 1985 (#85001189)	NH 109; 43°33′37″N 71°04′04″W	Brookfield	
8	Carroll County Court House	Carroll County Court House	September 12, 2007 (#07000949)	20 Courthouse Square; 43°41′06″N 71°07′04″W	Ossipee	
9	Center Sandwich Historic District	Center Sandwich Historic District	December 22, 1983 (#83003997)	Roughly bounded by Skinner, Grove, Church, Maple and Main Sts., and Creamery Brook and Quimby Field Rds. 43°48′29″N 71°26′22″W	Sandwich	
10	Chocorua Lake Basin Historic District	Chocorua Lake Basin Historic District	June 9, 2005 (#05000569)	Parts of NH 16, Chocorua Lake Rd., Philbrick Neighborhood, Fowles, and Washington Hill Roads and Loring, MacGregor, and Bolles Rd; 43°54′01″N 71°14′13″W	Tamworth	
11	Conway Public Library	Conway Public Library	July 17, 2017 (#100001317)	15 Greenwood Ave. 43°58′43″N 71°07′02″W	Conway	
12	Cook Memorial Library	Cook Memorial Library	June 25, 1980 (#80000269)	Main St. 43°51′34″N 71°15′57″W	Tamworth	
13	Cotton Mountain Community Church	Cotton Mountain Community Church	March 7, 1985 (#85000475)	Stoneham Rd. 43°36′52″N 71°05′11″W	Wolfeboro	
14	District No. 2 Schoolhouse	District No. 2 Schoolhouse	October 3, 1980 (#80000270)	2851 Wakefield Rd. 43°34′23″N 71°01′58″W	Wakefield	
15	Durgin Bridge	Durgin Bridge	September 22, 1983 (#83001130)	Durgin Bridge Rd. 43°51′21″N 71°21′53″W	Sandwich	Over Cold River
16	Eagle Cliff		July 5, 2018 (#100002640)	Address Restricted	Sandwich	Part of the Squam MPS
17	Eagle Mountain House	Eagle Mountain House	December 6, 1990 (#90001848)	Carter Notch Rd. north of its junction with NH 16A; 44°09′23″N 71°11′10″W	Jackson	
18	Early Settlers Meeting House	Early Settlers Meeting House	June 12, 1995 (#95000680)	Junction of Granite and Foggs Ridge Rds. 43°40′44″N 71°01′44″W	Leighton Corner	
19	Eastern Slope Inn	Eastern Slope Inn	August 10, 1982 (#82004994)	Main St. 44°03′16″N 71°07′49″W	North Conway	
20	William K. Eastman House	William K. Eastman House	June 6, 2001 (#01000629)	100 Main St. 43°58′43″N 71°07′23″W	Conway	
21	Eaton Center Free Will Baptist Church		September 29, 2026 (#100013457)	2371 Eaton Road; 43°54′32″N 71°04′50″W	Eaton	
22	First Free Will Baptist Church	First Free Will Baptist Church	March 15, 1984 (#84002518)	Granite Rd. 43°40′27″N 71°01′15″W	Ossipee	
23	Fore Point	Fore Point	January 17, 2017 (#100000475)	Address Restricted	Sandwich	Part of the Squam MPS
24	Freese's Tavern	Freese's Tavern	April 29, 1982 (#82001668)	Main St. 43°45′17″N 71°23′50″W	Moultonborough	Now known as the Old Country Store
25	Great Falls Manufacturing Company Newichawannock Canal Historic District	Great Falls Manufacturing Company Newichawannock Canal Historic District	August 6, 2014 (#14000460)	Between Great East Lake and Horn Pond; 43°34′10″N 70°58′16″W	Wakefield	Extends into Acton in York County, Maine
26	Green Pastures	Green Pastures	April 5, 2016 (#16000145)	Address restricted	Sandwich	
27	Hansen's Annex	Hansen's Annex	September 22, 1983 (#83001131)	Main St. 43°48′26″N 71°26′21″W	Center Sandwich	
28	Jackson Falls National Register Historic District	Jackson Falls National Register Historic District	March 12, 2003 (#03000110)	Approximately parts of Jackson Village Rd. and Five Mile Circuit Rd. 44°08′52″N 71°10′51″W	Jackson	
29	Bradbury Jewell House	Bradbury Jewell House	August 27, 1986 (#86002792)	154 Ferncroft Rd. 43°54′51″N 71°21′45″W	Sandwich	
30	Jimmy Point Camp	Jimmy Point Camp	July 5, 2018 (#100002641)	Address Restricted	Sandwich	Part of the Squam MPS
31	Joy Farm	Joy Farm	November 11, 1971 (#71000048)	Salter Hill Rd. 43°54′56″N 71°11′01″W	Madison	Home of poet E. E. Cummings
32	Libby Museum	Libby Museum	June 29, 1998 (#98000690)	Junction of NH 109 and Lang Pond Rd. 43°36′51″N 71°15′32″W	Wolfeboro	
33	Lord's Hill Historic District	Lord's Hill Historic District	September 12, 1985 (#85002162)	NH 153; 43°45′49″N 70°59′51″W	Effingham	
34	Lower Corner Historic District	Lower Corner Historic District	December 1, 1986 (#86003380)	NH 109; 43°47′32″N 71°24′49″W	Sandwich	
35	Lucknow	Lucknow	July 5, 2018 (#100002642)	455 Old Mountain Rd. 43°43′42″N 71°19′19″W	Moultonborough	Better known as Castle in the Clouds; designated a National Historic Landmark in 2024.
36	Madison School, District No. 1	Madison School, District No. 1	December 11, 1980 (#80000271)	NH 113; 43°53′47″N 71°09′12″W	Madison	
37	Moultonborough Town House	Moultonborough Town House	December 1, 1989 (#89002057)	NH 25, 0.3 miles (0.48 km) southwest of NH 109; 43°45′07″N 71°24′01″W	Moultonborough	Now a local history museum
38	New England Masonic Charitable Institute	New England Masonic Charitable Institute	September 19, 2019 (#100004415)	30 Town House Rd. 43°44′21″N 71°00′42″W	Effingham	
39	North Conway 5 and 10 Cent Store	North Conway 5 and 10 Cent Store	January 5, 2004 (#03001282)	2683 Main St. 44°03′10″N 71°07′40″W	North Conway	
40	North Conway Depot and Railroad Yard	North Conway Depot and Railroad Yard	August 10, 1979 (#79003792)	Norcross Circle; 44°03′06″N 71°07′44″W	North Conway	
41	North Sandwich Meeting House	North Sandwich Meeting House	June 5, 1986 (#86001230)	Quaker-Whiteface Rd. 43°51′41″N 71°21′58″W	Sandwich	
42	Pickering House	Pickering House	April 16, 2019 (#100003596)	116 S. Main St. 43°35′04″N 71°12′32″W	Wolfeboro	
43	Pointfield	Pointfield	October 8, 2014 (#14000842)	14 Sabine Point Road; 43°46′42″N 71°28′42″W	Sandwich	Part of the Squam MPS
44	Pratt Family Camps	Pratt Family Camps	August 15, 2012 (#12000503)	Address Restricted	Moultonborough	Part of the Squam MPS
45	Capt. Enoch Remick House	Capt. Enoch Remick House	June 3, 1996 (#96000616)	4 Great Hill Rd. 43°51′38″N 71°16′15″W	Tamworth	Now a local farm museum
46	Russell-Colbath House	Russell-Colbath House	April 23, 1987 (#86003416)	Kancamagus Highway; 43°59′47″N 71°20′25″W	Albany	
47	St. John's Church, Rectory, and Parish Hall	St. John's Church, Rectory, and Parish Hall	June 7, 1984 (#84002519)	High St. 43°33′27″N 71°01′45″W	Wakefield	
48	Swallow Boathouse	Swallow Boathouse	August 26, 1980 (#80000272)	South of Moultonborough; 43°41′44″N 71°24′23″W	Moultonborough	
49	Town Hall	Town Hall	May 15, 1980 (#80000273)	Maple St. 43°48′27″N 71°26′18″W	Center Sandwich	
50	Tuftonboro United Methodist Church	Tuftonboro United Methodist Church	June 16, 1997 (#97000505)	Northern side of NH 171, east of its junction with Durgan Rd. 43°41′45″N 71°13′16″W	Tuftonboro	
51	Union Church	Union Church	April 29, 1982 (#82001669)	S. Main St. 43°33′47″N 71°10′38″W	South Wolfeboro	
52	Union Hotel	Union Hotel	December 1, 1989 (#89002055)	Main St. at Chapel St. 43°29′32″N 71°01′29″W	Wakefield	
53	Union Railroad Station and Freight Shed		January 11, 2022 (#100007349)	1 Chapel St. 43°29′30″N 71°01′25″W	Wakefield	
54	Wakefield House	Wakefield House	June 23, 1983 (#83001133)	NH 153 at Wakefield Rd. 43°34′05″N 71°01′44″W	Wakefield	
55	Wakefield Public Library	Wakefield Public Library	September 8, 1983 (#83001132)	2699 Wakefield Rd. 43°34′09″N 71°01′48″W	Wakefield	
56	Wakefield Town Hall and Opera House	Wakefield Town Hall and Opera House	June 12, 2007 (#07000550)	2 High St. 43°33′14″N 71°01′50″W	Wakefield	
57	Wakefield Village Historic District	Wakefield Village Historic District	March 15, 1984 (#84002521)	Off NH 153; 43°34′07″N 71°01′46″W	Wakefield	
58	White Meetinghouse	White Meetinghouse	May 15, 1980 (#80000274)	South of Eaton Center on Towle Hill Rd. 43°51′31″N 71°04′30″W	Eaton	
59	Whittier Bridge	Whittier Bridge	March 15, 1984 (#84002558)	Old NH 25; 43°49′20″N 71°12′43″W	West Ossipee	Over Bearcamp River
60	Windermere	Windermere	November 14, 1979 (#79000195)	Southwest of Moultonborough on Long Island; 43°38′04″N 71°20′36″W	Moultonborough	
61	Wolfeboro Centre Community Church	Wolfeboro Centre Community Church	March 15, 1984 (#84002564)	NH 109; 43°37′09″N 71°10′15″W	Wolfeboro Center	

== See also ==
- List of National Historic Landmarks in New Hampshire
- National Register of Historic Places listings in New Hampshire
