= North Conway 5 and 10 Cent Store =

- U.S. National Register of Historic Places
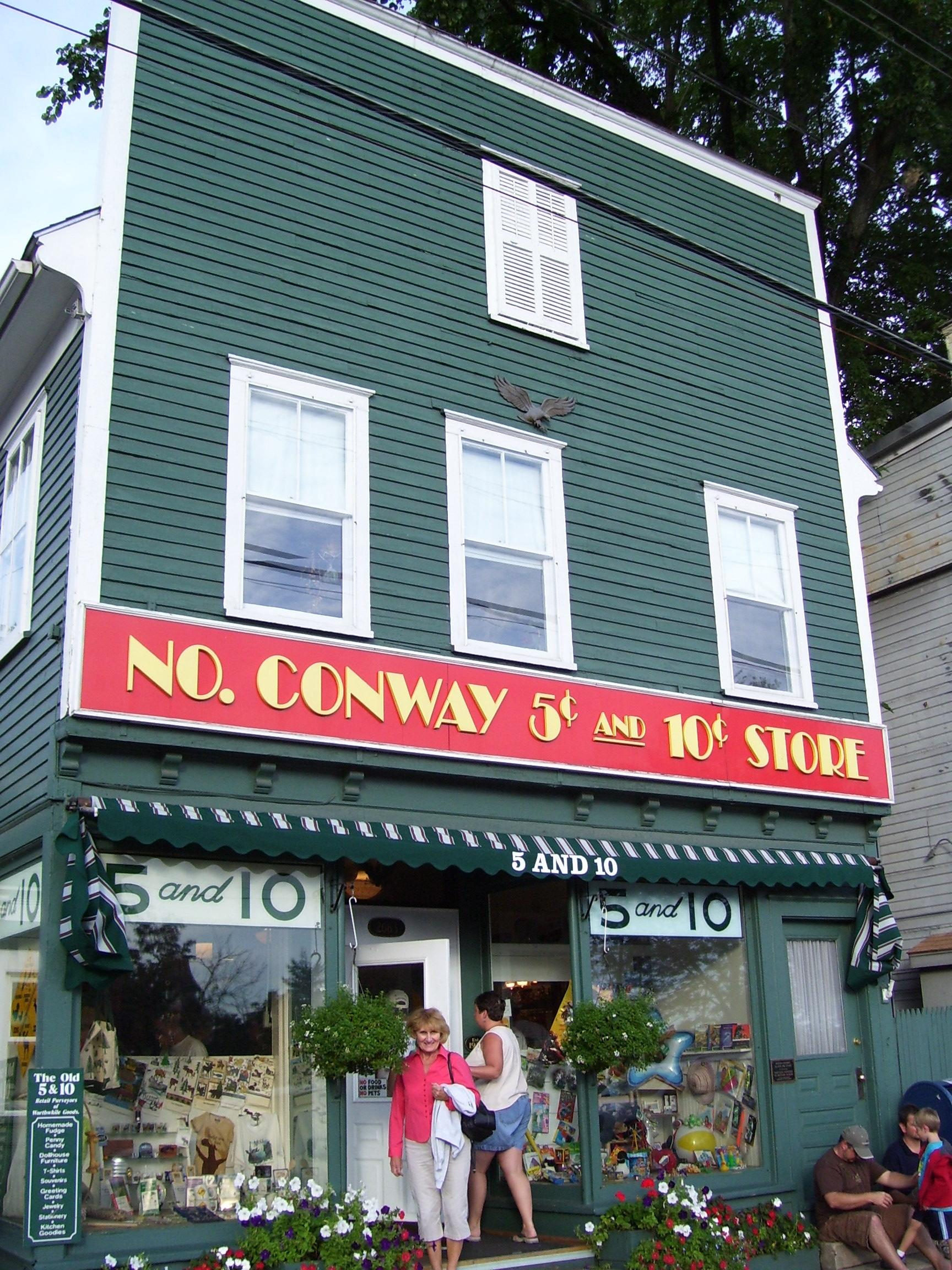

- Location within New Hampshire Location within the United States
- Location: 2683 Main St., North Conway, New Hampshire
- Coordinates: 44°3′10″N 71°7′40″W
- Area: less than one acre
- Built: 1900
- Architectural style: Early Commercial
- NRHP reference No.: 03001282
- Added to NRHP: January 5, 2004

The North Conway 5 and 10 Cent Store is a historic general store at 2683 Main Street in North Conway, New Hampshire. Built about 1840 and significantly modified in 1900, it is one of a small number of surviving dime stores in New Hampshire, and is architecturally unusual in the state for its "boom town" false front facade. The building was listed on the National Register of Historic Places in 2004.

== Description ==
The North Conway 5 and 10 Cent Store occupies a prominent position on the east side of Main Street in downtown North Conway, at its junction with Kearsarge Street. It is a 2 1/2-story wood-frame building, with a gabled roof that is obscured by the western-style false front, which extends a full three stories. The ground floor has a single storefront, with plate glass windows flanking a recessed entrance, and a secondary entrance at the far right. Three sash windows are irregularly spaced on the second floor, and a single sash window appears at the center of the third floor. The interior's appearance dates to the turn of the 20th century, with a tin ceiling and plaster walls with vertical board wainscoting, counter displays of glass and wood, and maple floors. An ell at the rear of the store has linoleum flooring and acoustic paneling on the walls, with a dropped ceiling above.

== History ==
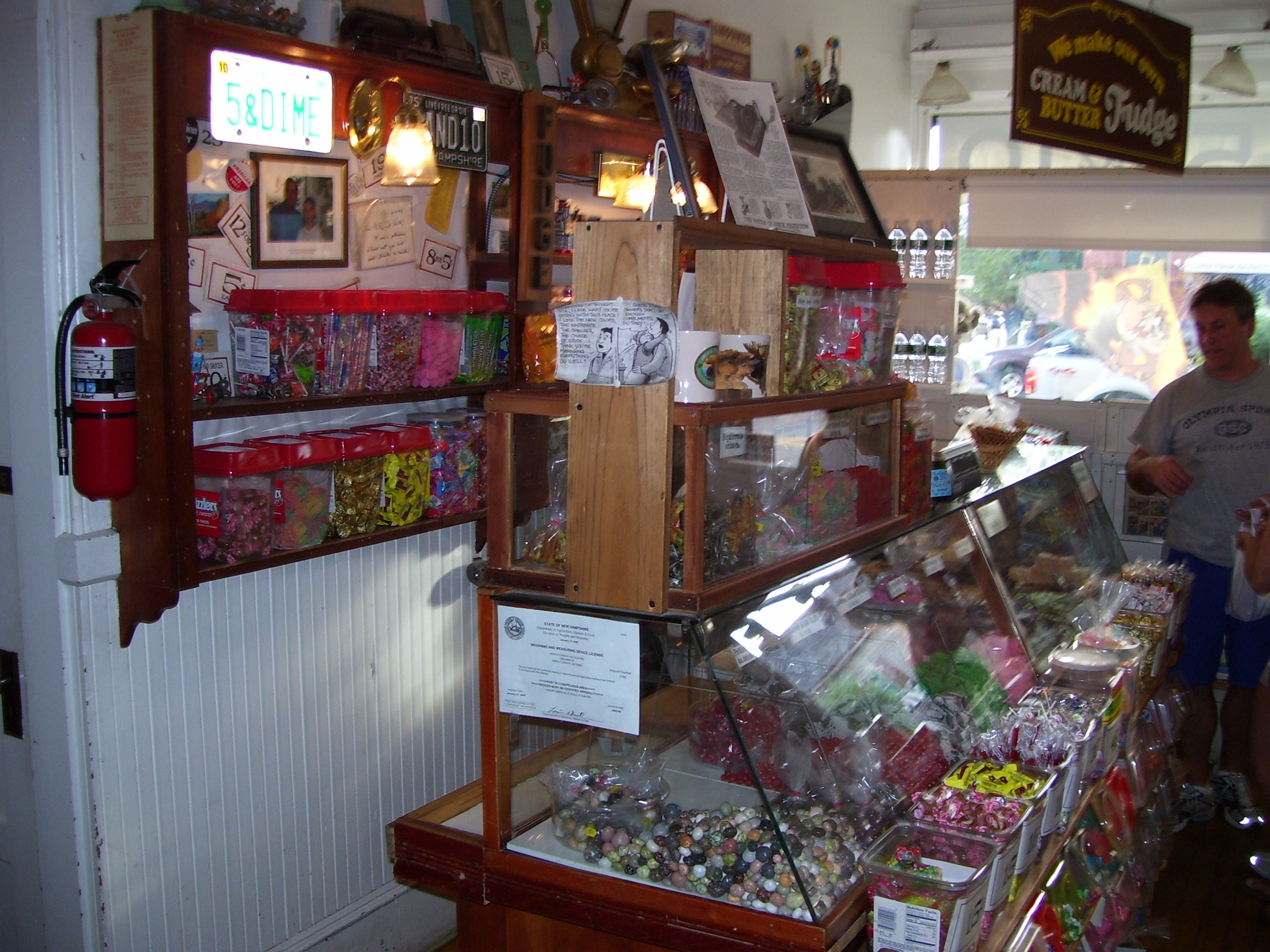
Interior view

The building's original construction date is estimated to be about 1840, but its present appearance dates to a major renovation c. 1900. The rear ell was added about 1940. The false front is the only one of its type in North Conway. The store has been in continuous operation since 1939, under several different owners. At the time of its listing on the National Register in 2004, it was one of only two known 5 and 10 stores in the state.

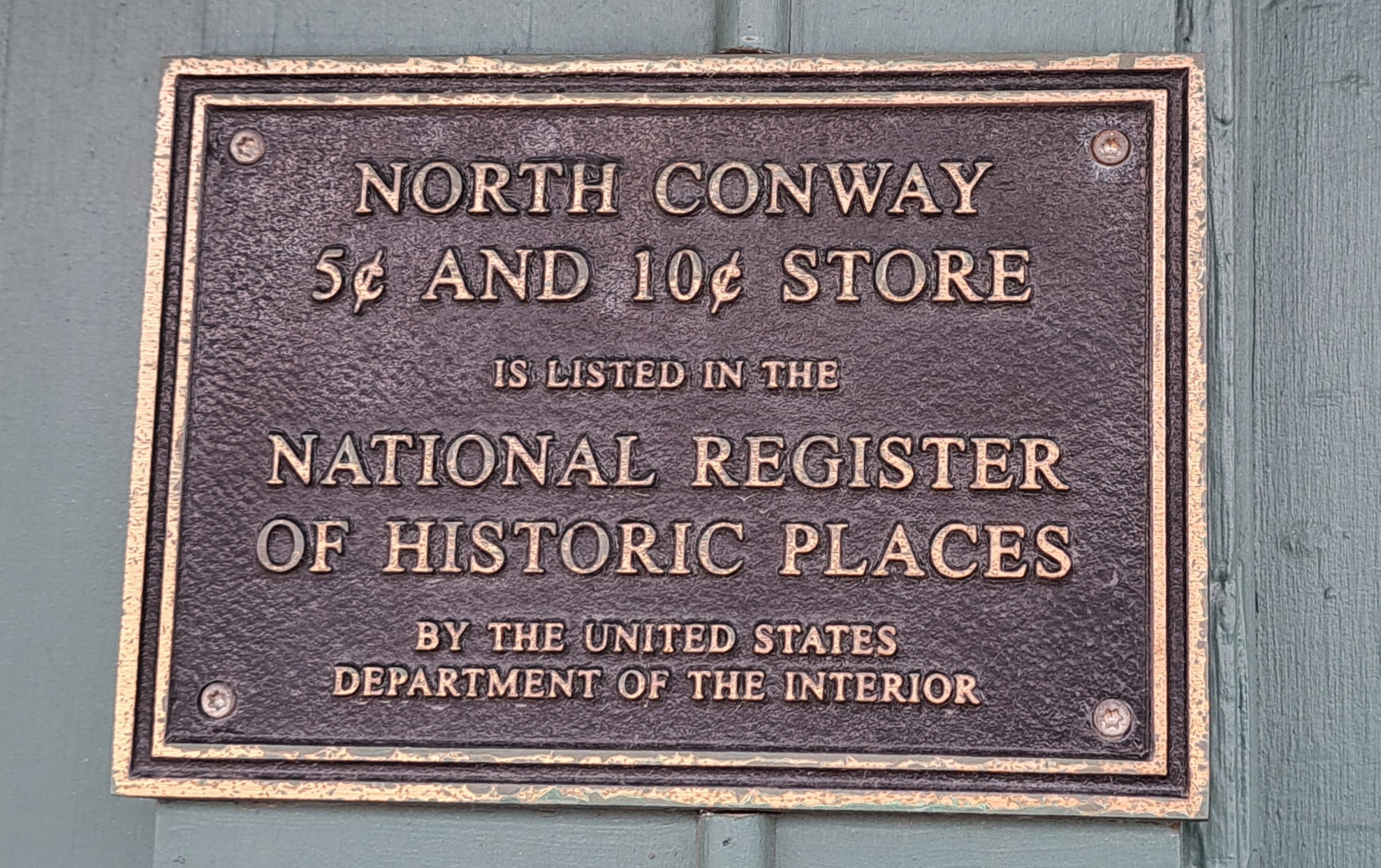
NRHP plaque

== See also ==
- National Register of Historic Places listings in Carroll County, New Hampshire
