= Freese's Tavern =

- U.S. National Register of Historic Places
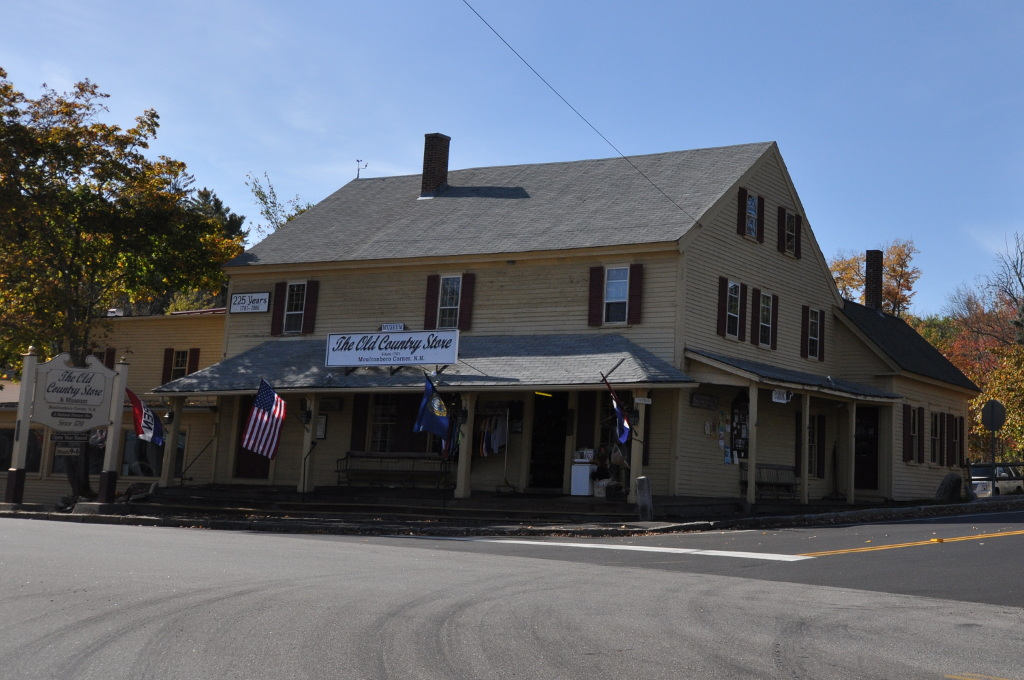

- Location within New Hampshire Location within the United States
- Location: 1011 Whittier Hwy., Moultonborough, New Hampshire
- Coordinates: 43°45′17″N 71°23′50″W
- Area: 0.8 acres (0.32 ha)
- Built: 1780
- NRHP reference No.: 82001668
- Added to NRHP: April 29, 1982

Freese's Tavern is a historic tavern and general store at 1011 Whittier Highway, the northwest corner of the junction of New Hampshire Routes 109 and 25 in Moultonborough, New Hampshire. With a building history dating to about 1780, and a continuous history of operation as a tavern, general store, post office, library, and town hall, it is one of the oldest establishments of its type in the United States. It is presently known as The Old Country Store, and includes museum displays on its history. The building was listed on the National Register of Historic Places in 1982.

== Description and history ==
The Old Country Store is located in the village center of Moultonborough, at the northwest corner of Whittier Highway (NH 25) and Holland Street (NH 109). The 2-1/2 story building is built out of rough-hewn timbers and sheathed in clapboards. Single-story porches shelter both street-facing facades. A shed-roofed ell, originally a stable, is attached to the south side, and a small 1-1/2 story gabled addition was added to the north side in 1870, and two additional wings were added in the 1950s.

The oldest portion of the building, now an ell, was built c. 1780 by George Freese. Freese played a leading role in local politics, and it was during his ownership that town meetings began to be held here. David Bean, the next proprietor, also served as postmaster for the town. In the late 19th century an upstairs space housed the town library. The building ceased to house the post office in 1967.

== See also ==
- National Register of Historic Places listings in Carroll County, New Hampshire
