= Wolfeboro Centre Community Church =

Historic church in New Hampshire, United States

- U.S. National Register of Historic Places
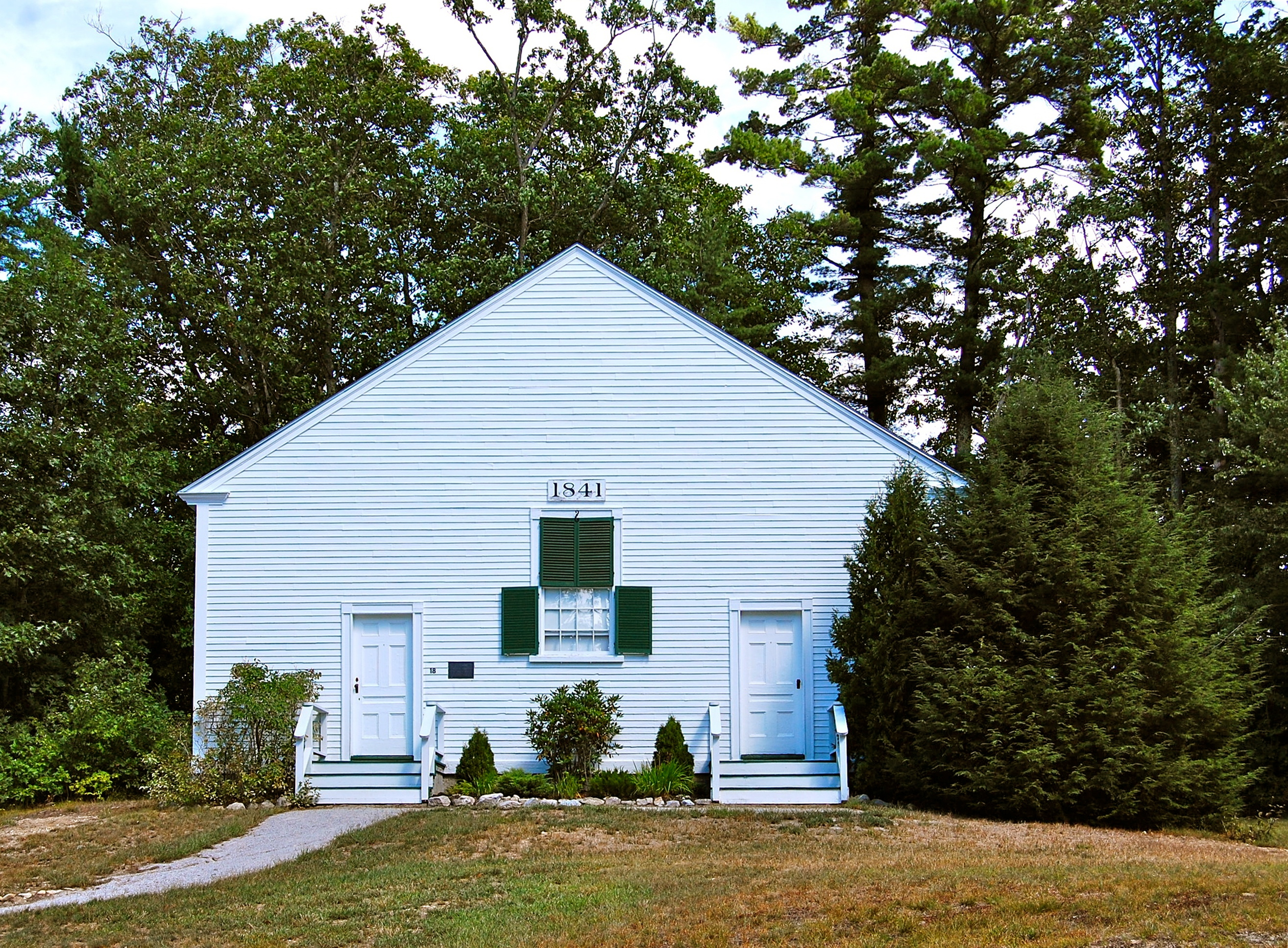
- Wolfeboro Centre Community Church

- Location within New Hampshire Location within the United States
- Location: NH 109, Wolfeboro Center, New Hampshire
- Coordinates: 43°37′9″N 71°10′15″W
- Area: 0.3 acres (0.12 ha)
- Built: 1841
- Architectural style: Vernacular Federal/Greek Revival
- NRHP reference No.: 84002564
- Added to NRHP: March 15, 1984

The Wolfeboro Centre Community Church (also known as the Union Meeting House, First Christian Society, and Second Christian Church) is a historic church on New Hampshire Route 109 in Wolfeboro Center, New Hampshire. Built in 1841 for two separate congregations, it is a well-preserved example of a rural mid-19th century church. The building was listed on the National Register of Historic Places in 1984.

== Description and history ==
The Wolfeboro Centre Community Church stands in a geographically central rural setting northeast of Wolfeboro village, on the north side of NH 109 a short way east of its junction with New Hampshire Route 28. It is a single-story wood-frame structure, with a gabled roof, clapboarded exterior, and granite foundation. There is no tower. The main facade is symmetrical, with a pair of entrances flanking a raised sash window. Trim consists of simple corner boards at the building corners, a modest Greek Revival entablature and cornice on the side eaves, and simple trim with corner blocks around the doors and windows. Its interior consists of a single auditorium, with a dais at the front (between the two front doors), and angled rows of slip pews with doors facing it.

The church was built in 1841 to house the religious activities of two congregations. One was a Free Will Baptist congregation established in 1780 in nearby New Durham, the other was an independent Congregationalist group established in 1803 in Portsmouth. The building is one of the least-altered 19th-century community churches in eastern New Hampshire. The inverted interior floor plan (with the dais at the front rather than the back) is an unusual but not uncommon layout for churches of the period in northern New England.

== See also ==
- National Register of Historic Places listings in Carroll County, New Hampshire
