= Union Church (South Wolfeboro, New Hampshire) =

Historic church in New Hampshire, United States

- U.S. National Register of Historic Places
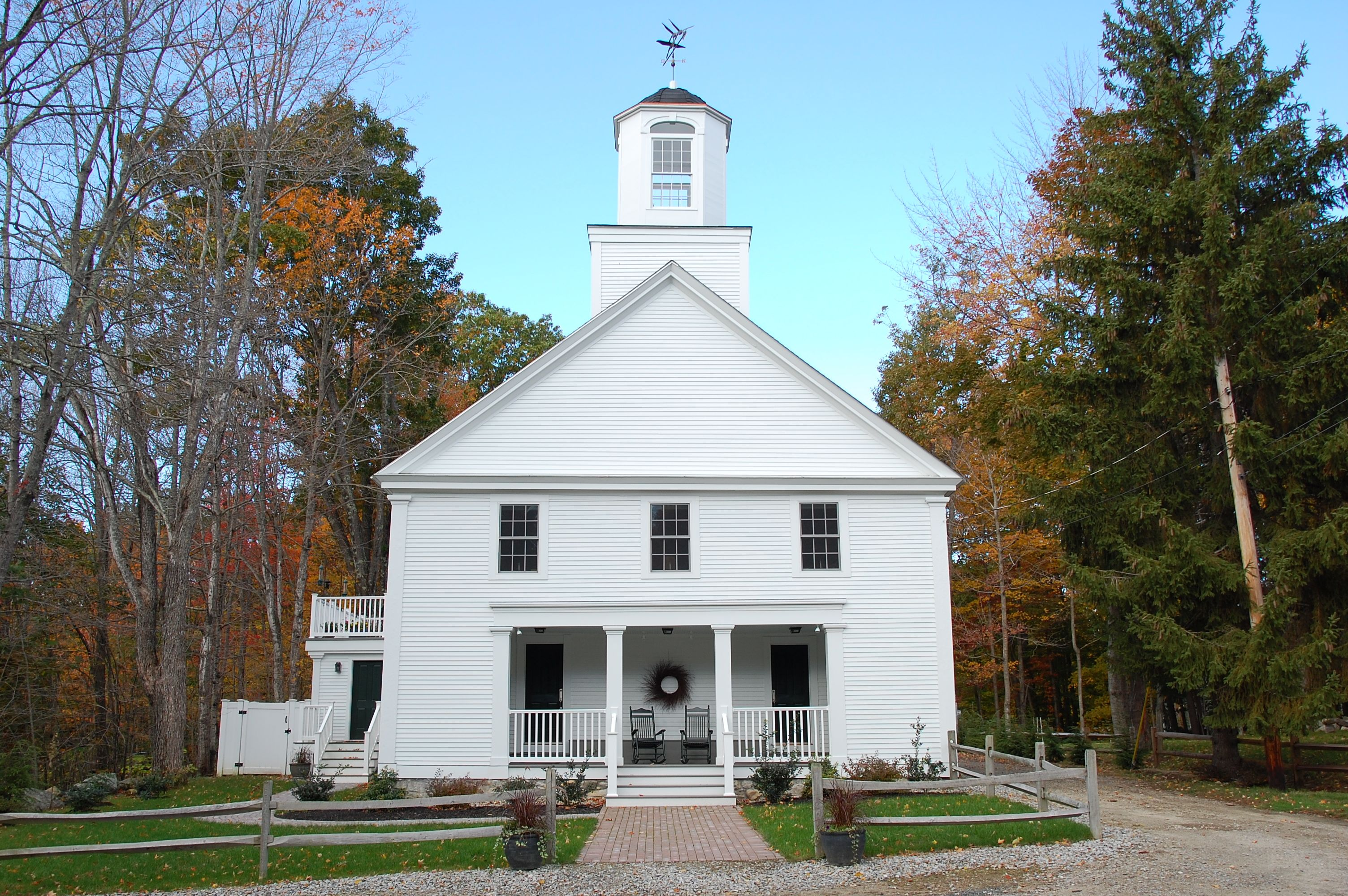
- Union Church of South Wolfeboro, but now called the South Wolfeboro Meetinghouse

- Location within New Hampshire Location within the United States
- Location: S. Main St., South Wolfeboro, New Hampshire
- Coordinates: 43°33′47″N 71°10′38″W
- Area: 1 acre (0.40 ha)
- Built: 1845
- Architectural style: Greek Revival
- NRHP reference No.: 82001669
- Added to NRHP: April 29, 1982

The Union Church is a historic church on South Main Street in South Wolfeboro, New Hampshire, United States. Built in 1845 for the use of several small religious congregations, it is a well-preserved example of mid-19th century vernacular Greek Revival architecture. The building was listed on the National Register of Historic Places in 1982.

== Description and history ==
The Union Church is located south of the main village of Wolfeboro, on the west side of South Main Street (New Hampshire Route 28) a short way north of its junction with Middleton Road. It is a 2 1/2-story wood-frame structure, with a gabled roof and clapboarded exterior. A two-stage tower rises from the roof ridge, with a plain square first stage and an octagonal second stage with windows on four sides. The windows are topped by semi-oval fanlights, and the tower is crowned by a cupola. The building's front facade has pilasters at the corners, which rise to a pedimented gable. The facade is symmetrical, with a central recess housing a pair of entrances. The recess is defined by corner pilasters and matching square columns, and is topped by a corniced entablature.

The earliest church organizations in Wolfeboro were either Free Will Baptists, a teaching founded in neighboring New Durham in 1780, or derivatives of that group. Religious ferment in the community resulted in the construction of no less than sixteen church buildings in the 19th century. This one was built in 1845 by a coalition of congregations that were either Universalist in outlook, or derived from the Free Will Baptists. Although the Universalists were the largest group involved in its construction, the rotating ministers in the pulpit were drawn from a wide array of teachings.

== See also ==
- National Register of Historic Places listings in Carroll County, New Hampshire
