= Libby Museum =

- U.S. National Register of Historic Places
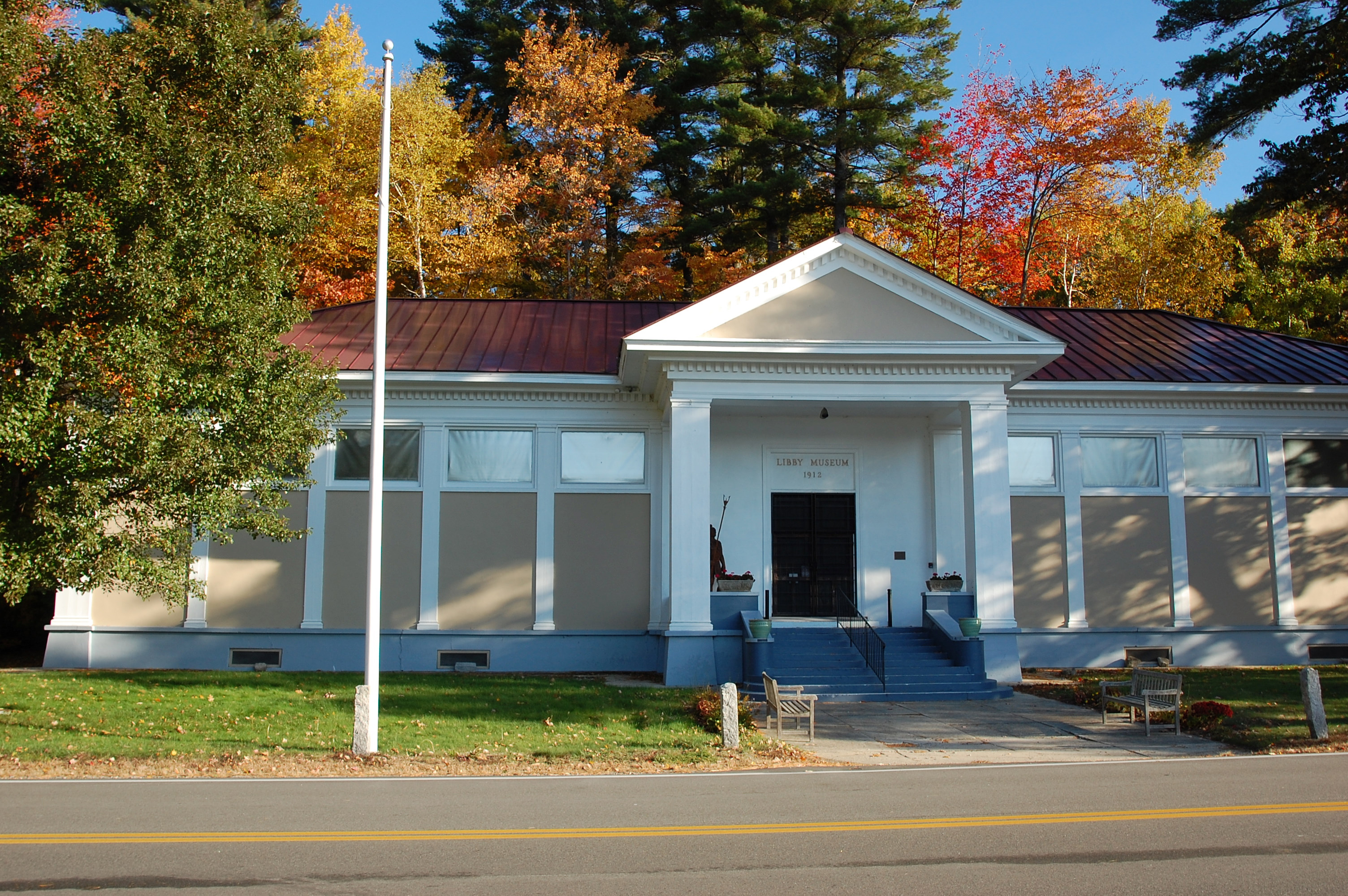

- Location within New Hampshire Location within the United States
- Location: Jct. of 109N and Lang Pond Rd., Wolfeboro, New Hampshire
- Coordinates: 43°36′51″N 71°15′32″W
- Area: 1.42 acres (0.57 ha)
- Built: 1912
- Architect: C. Howard Walker
- NRHP reference No.: 98000690
- Added to NRHP: June 29, 1998

The Libby Museum is a natural history museum at 755 North Main Street (New Hampshire Route 109 at Lang Pond Road) in Wolfeboro, New Hampshire. The museum was founded by Dr. Henry Libby in 1912, and was the first museum in the state dedicated solely to its natural history. It is owned by the town of Wolfeboro, and is open seasonally between June and October. The museum's building was listed on the National Register of Historic Places in 1998.

== Setting ==
The museum is located in northwestern Wolfeboro, on the north side of NH 109 overlooking the Winter Harbor inlet of Lake Winnipesaukee. It was built between 1908 and 1912 by Dr. Henry Forest Libby and constructed by local workmen from timber felled from nearby Rattlesnake Island. It is a basically rectangular building, covered by a hip roof and set on a concrete foundation. Its exterior walls are finished in stucco, and are divided into bays articulated by pilasters. At the top of most bays, just below the roofline, is a large single-pane window. One bay at the center of the main facade houses the museum entrance, sheltered by a gabled portico. The interior of the museum is a single large chamber, with plaster walls and hardwood floors. An unusual air circulation pattern facilitates natural cooling of the building, with air vents to the outside at the base of some of the bays.

== Collection and history ==
The museum was the brainchild of Dr. Henry Libby, who had amassed a large collection of natural specimens, and began planning for the museum's construction in 1890. The museum building was designed by Dr. Libby in consultation with C. Howard Walker of Boston, Massachusetts, and was completed in 1912. Dr. Libby died in 1933, leaving the museum in trust to his children, or the town if they did not want to manage it. In 1956, the town formally exercised its authority to assume management of the museum. Of New Hampshire's early museums, it is the first to be exclusively dedicated to the state's natural history.

The museum collection includes specimens of plants, animals, birds, and fish, as well as minerals. It is open seasonally between the beginning of June and the Columbus Day weekend in October; admission is charged.

== See also ==
- National Register of Historic Places listings in Carroll County, New Hampshire
