= Pickering House (Wolfeboro, New Hampshire) =

Historic house in New Hampshire, United States

- U.S. National Register of Historic Places
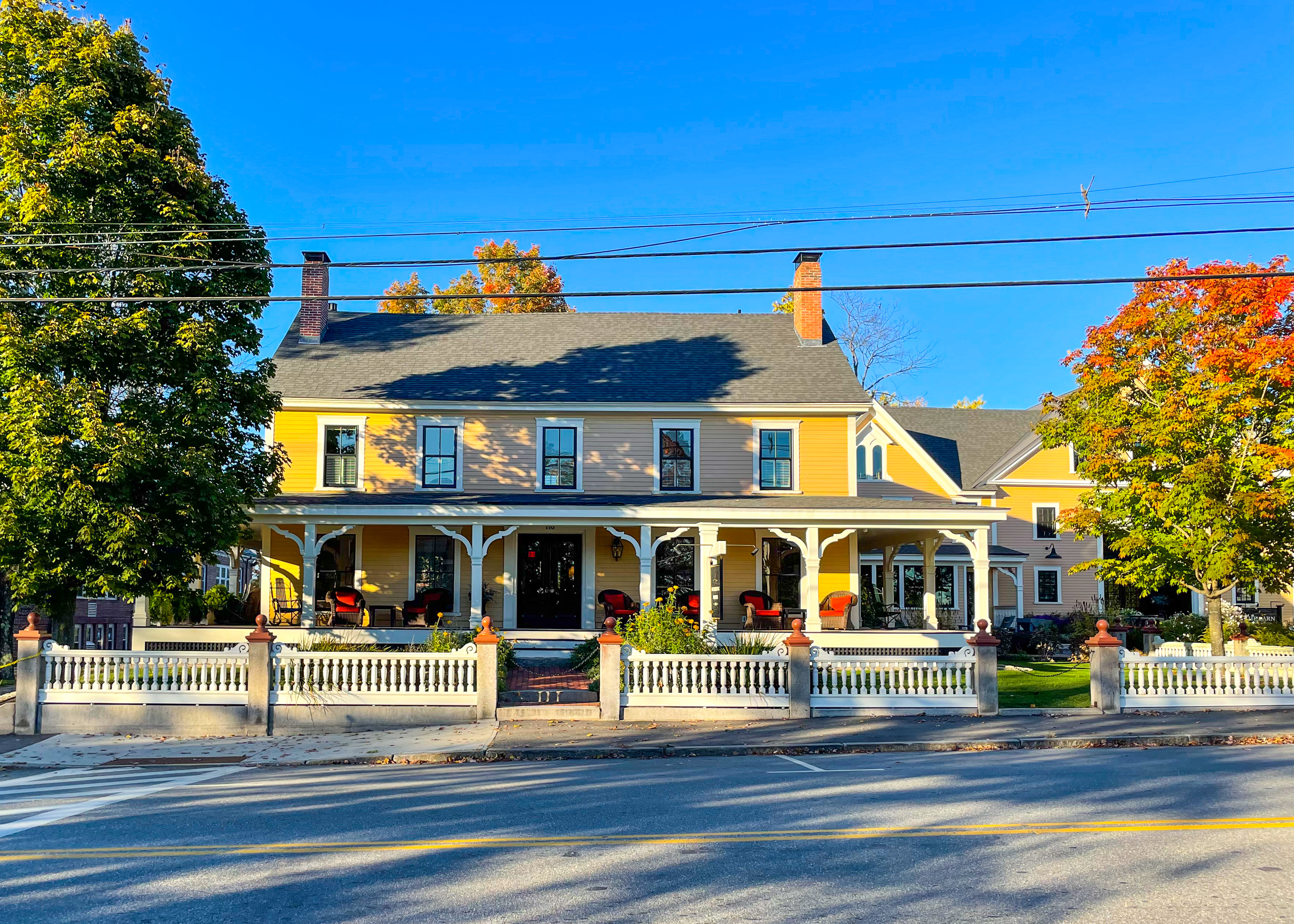
- Pickering House in October 2021

- Location within New Hampshire Location within the United States
- Location: 116 South Main St., Wolfeboro, New Hampshire
- Coordinates: 43.5844°N 71.2090°W
- Built: 1813
- Architectural style: Greek Revival with Italianate features
- NRHP reference No.: 100003596
- Added to NRHP: April 16, 2019

Pickering House is an historic house in the town of Wolfeboro, New Hampshire. It is located on South Main Street (New Hampshire Route 109) in the town center. The property was listed on the National Register of Historic Places (NRHP) in 2019. Pickering House is located approximately 300 feet (91 m) east of Brewster Memorial Hall, which is also listed on the NRHP.

The main house and a barn date to 1813; ells were added circa 1843 and 1870. The house was built by Daniel Pickering, who owned multiple businesses in Wolfeboro and was the town's first postmaster.

In 2016, after the property had fallen into disrepair, it was sold to new owners. They made significant improvements to the property, turning it into a boutique hotel, which opened in 2018.

== See also ==
- National Register of Historic Places listings in Carroll County, New Hampshire
