= Wakefield House =

Historic house in New Hampshire, United States

- U.S. National Register of Historic Places
- U.S. Historic district – Contributing property
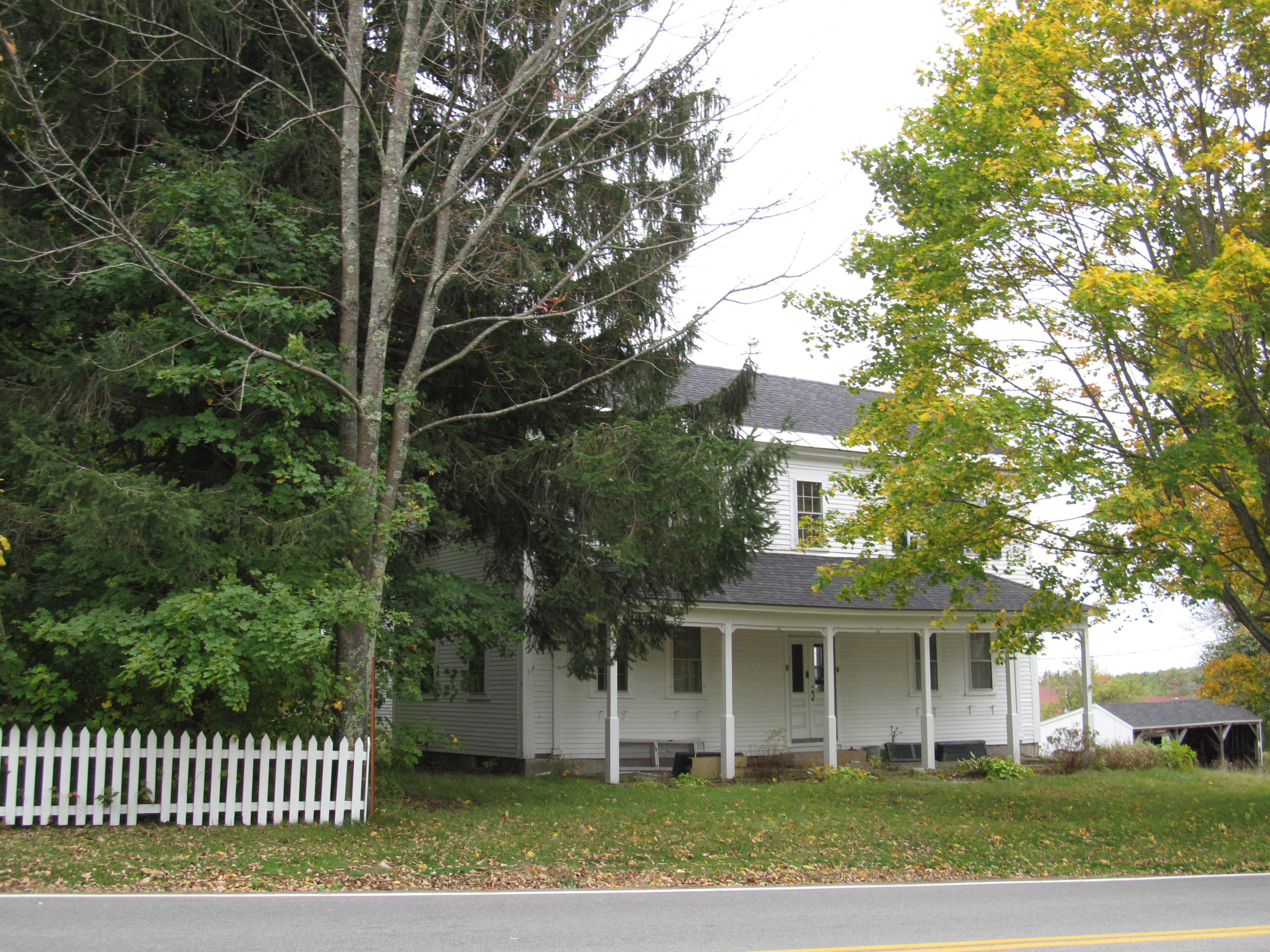
- The house in 2012

- Location within New Hampshire Location within the United States
- Location: NH 153 at Wakefield Rd., Wakefield, New Hampshire
- Coordinates: 43°34′5″N 71°1′44″W
- Area: 2.2 acres (0.89 ha)
- Built: 1820
- Architectural style: Federal
- Part of: Wakefield Village Historic District (ID84002521)
- NRHP reference No.: 83001133

Significant dates
- Added to NRHP: June 23, 1983
- Designated CP: March 15, 1984

The Wakefield House is a historic house on New Hampshire Route 153 in the Wakefield Corner area of Wakefield, New Hampshire. The 2 1/2-story wood-frame house is believed to have been built c. 1785, but its exterior styling is mainly Federal in character, dating to the 1820s or later. It was used as an inn on the busy stagecoach route through town in the 19th century. It was listed on the National Register of Historic Places in 1983.

== Description and history ==
The Wakefield House is located in the central village of Wakefield Corner, on the east side of the triangular junction of New Hampshire Route 153 and Wakefield Road. It is a 2 1/2-story wood-frame structure, with a side-gable roof, end chimneys, and clapboarded exterior. It has a five-bay facade, with a double center door that is a mid-19th century alteration, probably made when the building was converted for use as an inn in 1853. The single-story front porch, which extends the full width of the facade, also dates to this time. The property also includes a barn, carriage barn, and toolshed.

The village of Wakefield Corner is one of the older villages of the town, having become well established by 1800 as a center of commerce and transportation. It was home to the town offices, shops, and taverns and inns serving the stagecoach route. The village was bypassed by the railroad, which stopped at Sanbornville, a mile to the north, but has retained some of its civic importance. The Wakefield House, constructed in the late 19th century as a private residence, was converted into an inn in 1853 to serve this business. It continued in this use into the 1879s, and remains a well-preserved example of a mid-19th century traveler accommodation.

== See also ==
- National Register of Historic Places listings in Carroll County, New Hampshire
