= William K. Eastman House =

Historic house in New Hampshire, United States

- U.S. National Register of Historic Places
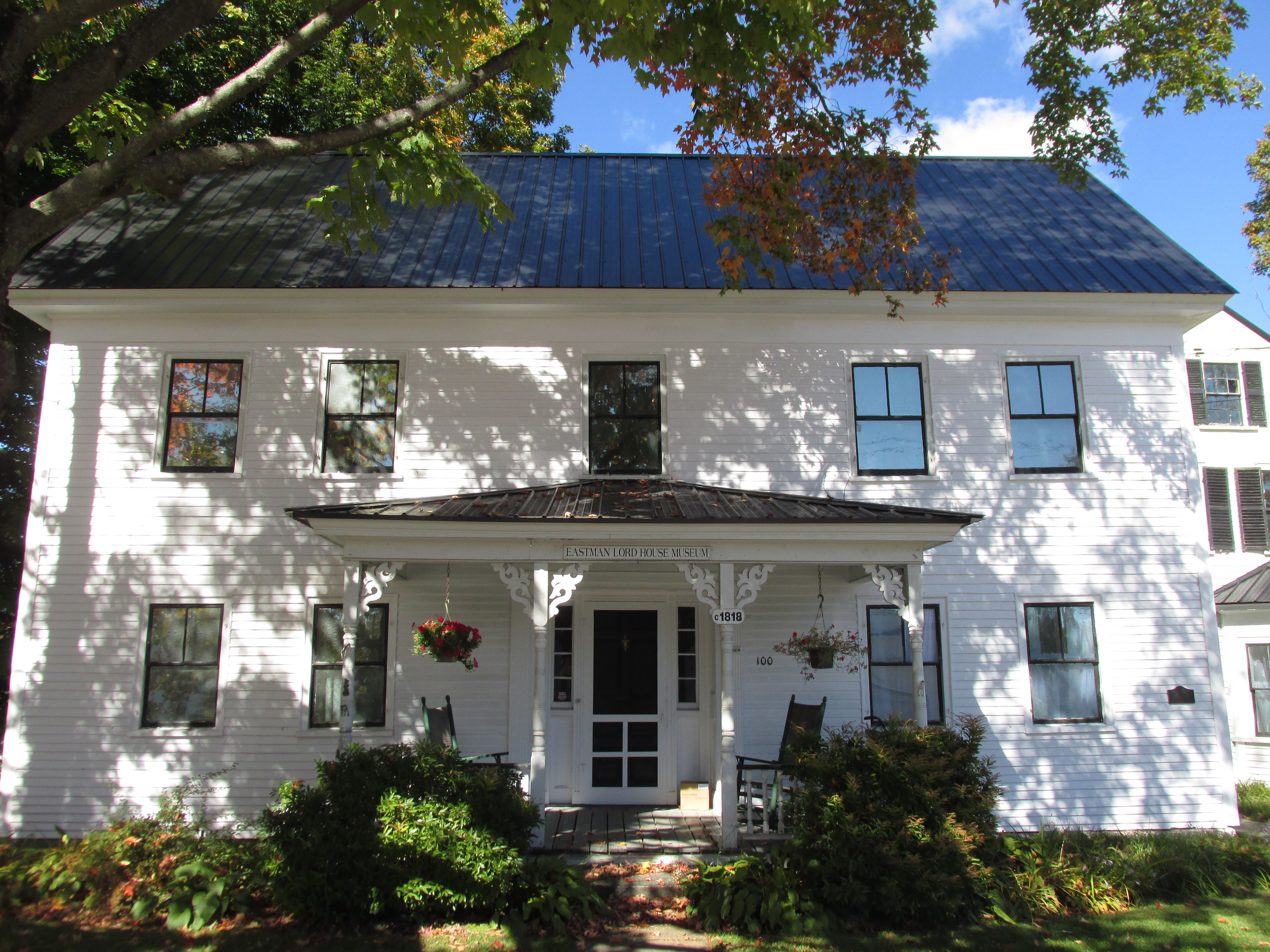

- Location within New Hampshire Location within the United States
- Location: 100 Main St., Conway, New Hampshire
- Coordinates: 43°58′43″N 71°7′23″W
- Area: 0.4 acres (0.16 ha)
- Built: 1818
- Architectural style: Federal, Greek Revival
- NRHP reference No.: 01000629
- Added to NRHP: June 6, 2001

The William K. Eastman House, also known as the Eastman-Lord House, is a historic house museum at 100 Main Street in Conway, New Hampshire. Built in 1818, it was the home of William K. Eastman, a prominent local businessman, politician, and civic leader until his death in 1879. Now home to the Conway Historical Society, it was listed on the National Register of Historic Places in 2001.

== Description and history ==
The William K. Eastman House stands in near the center of Conway Village, on the north side of Main Street (New Hampshire Route 16), a short way west of its crossing of the outlet of Pequawket Pond. It is a 2 1/2-story wood-frame structure, with a side-gable roof and clapboarded exterior. It has a symmetrical five-bay front facade, with a center entrance framed by sidelight windows, pilasters, and an entablature. It is sheltered by a Victorian hip-roof porch three bays wide, with turned posts and decorative jigsawn brackets.

The house was built in 1818 by William K. Eastman, who made it his home until his death in 1879. Eastman was a major economic force in Conway, operating a tannery, general store, and mill. His mill and tannery operations were located just to the east, using Pequawket Pond as a power source; none of these industrial properties have survived. He was also prominent in local politics, serving as sheriff, town selectman, and in the state legislature. He was wealthy enough to afford a four-wheel chaise coach, one of fifteen men to do so in the town's 1840 census. He sold the house in 1879 and moved to Minnesota, where he died. The house was donated by Raymond Lord to the Conway Historical Society in 1962. It is headquartered there and operates it as a house museum.

== See also ==
- National Register of Historic Places listings in Carroll County, New Hampshire
