= Brookfield Town Hall =

- U.S. National Register of Historic Places
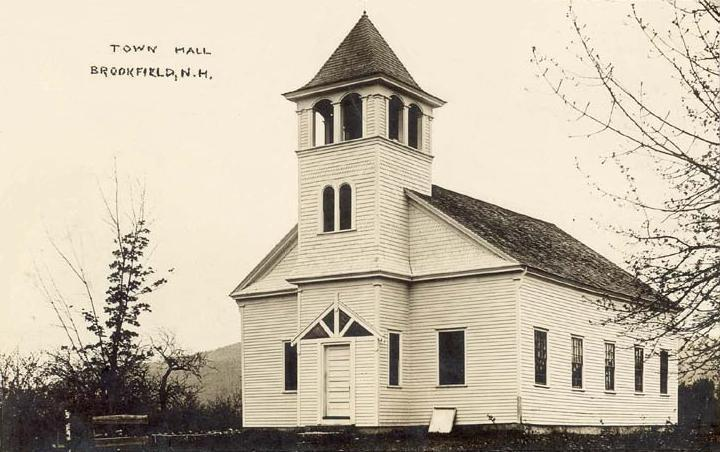
- Postcard view, c. 1915

- Location within New Hampshire Location within the United States
- Location: NH 109, Brookfield, New Hampshire
- Coordinates: 43°33′37″N 71°4′4″W
- Area: 0.5 acres (0.20 ha)
- Architect: Multiple
- Architectural style: Late Victorian
- NRHP reference No.: 85001189
- Added to NRHP: June 6, 1985

The Brookfield Town Hall is located on New Hampshire Route 109 in the center of Brookfield, New Hampshire. It has served as the rural community's town hall since its construction in 1822–23, and is its only major public meeting space. It underwent a stylistic renovation in 1907–08, giving it a distinctive blend of styles. The building was listed on the National Register of Historic Places in 1985.

== Description and history ==
Brookfield Town Hall is located in the modest rural village center of Brookfield, on the south side of New Hampshire 109 west of its junction with Lyford Road. It is a 1 1/2-story wood-frame structure with a gabled roof and clapboarded exterior. A single-story addition, originally a one-room schoolhouse, extends to the rear. Its main facade is three bays wide, dominated by a projecting central tower, which rises to an open belfry and a flared pyramidal roof. The second stage of the tower is finished decorative cut shingles, and the belfry stage has corner pilasters and paired segmented-arch openings. The main building entrance is in the base of the tower, topped by a simple jigsawn pediment.

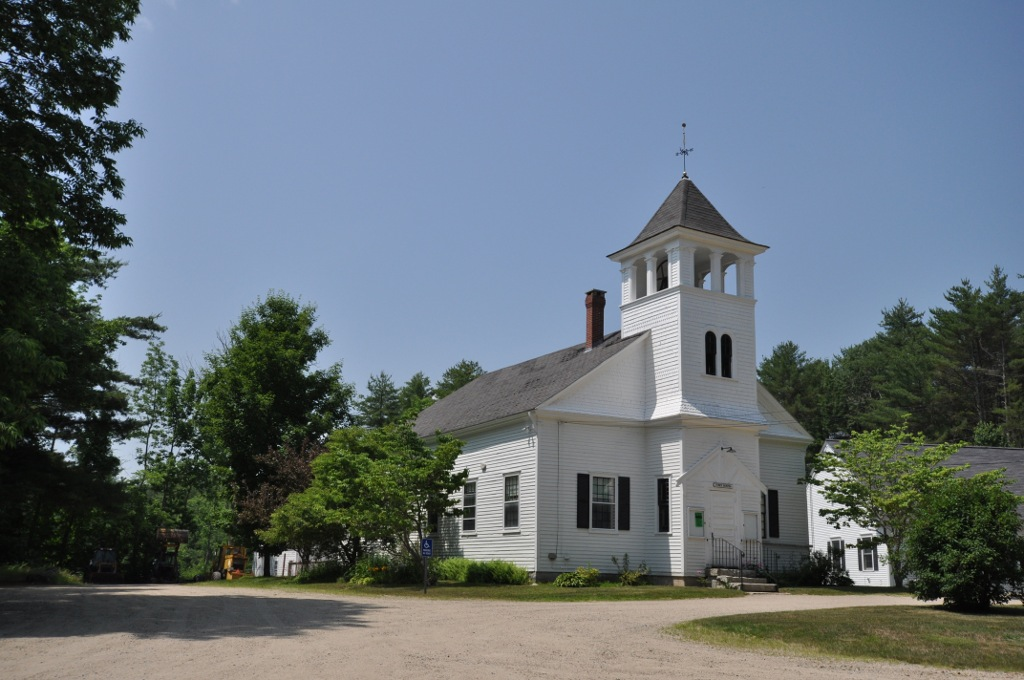
The town hall in 2014

The town hall was completed in 1823 after its construction was authorized the previous year. Although the building was also originally used for religious services, these now rarely take place. The building underwent two major renovations: In the 1870s and 1880s the box pews were removed, replaced by settees, and the pulpit was replaced by a platform. Quarters were built for the selectmen to meet, and for a space that housed first the library, and then a kitchen. In the early 19th century, a bell was donated to the town, resulting in the construction of a Victorian tower and belfry, and a gradual restyling of the interior to Victorian styles. This readaption of an older town hall is distinctive in the region, where most towns built new town halls. Alterations since that time have been modest.

== See also ==
- National Register of Historic Places listings in Carroll County, New Hampshire
