= Vanderbilt University Divinity School =

School of religion in Tennessee, US

Vanderbilt Divinity School and Graduate Department of Religion
- Type: Private
- Established: 1875
- Dean: Yolanda Pierce
- Postgraduates: 230
- Location: 411 21st Avenue South, Nashville, Tennessee, United States; 36.1467°N 86.8008°W

The Vanderbilt Divinity School and Graduate Department of Religion (usually Vanderbilt Divinity School) is an interdenominational divinity school at Vanderbilt University, a major research university located in Nashville, Tennessee. It is one of only six university-based schools of religion in the United States without a denominational affiliation that service primarily mainline Protestantism (University of Chicago Divinity School, Harvard Divinity School, Wake Forest University School of Divinity, Yale Divinity School, and Howard University School of Divinity are the others).

== Early history ==
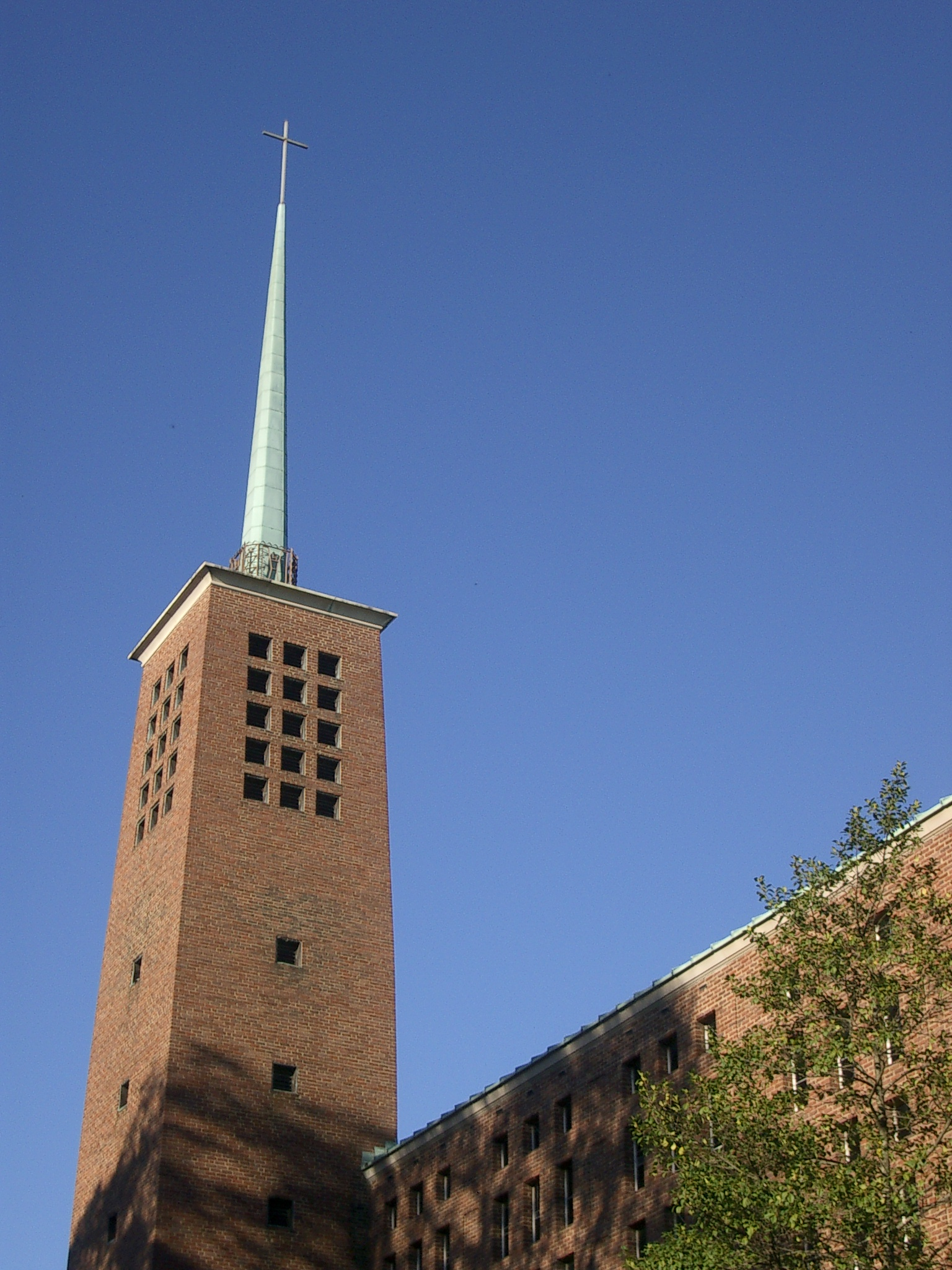
The spire of Benton Chapel

Vanderbilt Divinity School was founded in 1875 as the Biblical Department and was under the auspices of the Methodist Episcopal Church, South, one predecessor of the present-day United Methodist Church. In 1914, in concert with the university's severance of its ties with the MECS, the school became interdenominational and ecumenical, and in 1915, the school's name was changed from the Biblical Department of Vanderbilt University to the Vanderbilt School of Religion; it adopted its present name in 1956. The present physical plant of the school, known colloquially as the "quadrangle" or "quad," was completed in 1960; the Benton Chapel that abuts the quad is named for a mid-20th-century dean, John Keith Benton. In 1966 the Graduate School of Theology of Oberlin College in Ohio merged with that of Vanderbilt, increasing the faculty resources of both the Divinity School and the Graduate Department of Religion, as well as the holdings of the school's portion of the University Library.

== Civil Rights era ==
In 1960, African-American Divinity student James Lawson was expelled from the university for his Civil Rights activism by Chancellor Harvie Branscomb. One of Vanderbilt's trustees, James Geddes Stahlman, published misleading stories in a newspaper he owned, The Nashville Banner, which suggested Lawson had incited others to "violate the law" and led to his expulsion. The Divinity School dean, J. Robert Nelson, who initially believed the stories, eventually resigned in protest. Moreover, with three of his colleagues, Nelson "paid Lawson's $500 bail when he was arrested on charges of conspiracy to violate state laws the day after his expulsion." The school was placed on probation for a year by the American Association of Theological Schools, and the power of trustees was curtailed.

== Denominations served ==
Despite having ended formal association with Methodism nearly a century ago, the United Methodist Church is the largest beneficiary of graduates from the Divinity School, with sizable numbers ordained in denominations such as the Christian Church (Disciples of Christ) (which operates a seminarian apartment nearby the campus), the Presbyterian Church (USA), and African-American Baptist, Methodist, and Pentecostal groups. VDS, through the merger with Oberlin and an earlier absorption of Atlanta Theological Seminary, a Congregationalist seminary in Atlanta, Georgia, in 1929, maintains a historical relationship (although no legal ties) with the United Church of Christ as well.

Students come from throughout the United States, representing numerous denominations and traditions.

== Leadership ==
Yolanda Pierce, former dean of Howard University School of Divinity serves as the current dean of Vanderbilt Divinity School. Other recent deans of the Divinity School include Emilie M. Townes, Joseph C. Hough, Jr., Sallie McFague, Walter Harrelson, and H. Jackson Forstman.

Vanderbilt Divinity School is a member of the Association of Theological Schools in the United States and Canada.

== Notable faculty ==
- George Arthur Buttrick – English preacher, Minister of the Madison Avenue Presbyterian Church
- David G. Buttrick – Drucilla Moore Buffington Professor of Homiletics and Liturgies
- Collins Denny – Professor of Mental and Moral Philosophy, Bishop of the Methodist Episcopal Church, South
- Jean Bethke Elshtain – Centennial Professor, ethicist, political philosopher, public intellectual
- Nels F. S. Ferré – Swedish-born theologian, Professor of Philosophical & Systematic Theology
- Stacey M. Floyd-Thomas – Associate Professor of Ethics and Society, Executive Director of the Society of Christian Ethics
- Langdon Brown Gilkey – Professor, Protestant ecumenical theologian, Guggenheim Fellow
- Elijah Embree Hoss – Chair of Ecclesiastical History, Church Polity and Pastoral Theology
- Gordon D. Kaufman – Associate Professor of Theology, President of the American Academy of Religion and American Theological Society
- Amy-Jill Levine – E. Rhodes and Leona B. Carpenter Professor of New Testament Studies
- Paul C.H. Lim – Associate Professor of the History of Christianity
- Sallie McFague – Carpenter Professor of Theology
- Wilhelm Pauck – Distinguished Professor of Church History
- Joerg Rieger – German liberation theologian, Distinguished Professor of Theology
- Jack M. Sasson – Mary Jane Werthan Professor of Jewish Studies and Hebrew Bible
- Choon-Leong Seow – Vanderbilt, Buffington, Cupples Chair in Divinity, Distinguished Professor of Hebrew Bible
- Kelly Miller Smith – former Assistant Dean, civil rights movement activist
- The Rt. Rev. Eugene Sutton – 14th Episcopal Bishop of Maryland
- Fernando Segovia – Oberlin Graduate Professor of New Testament and Early Christianity, Society of Biblical Literature President
- Thomas Osmond Summers – Methodist theologian, Professor of Systematic Theology, former Dean
- Emilie Townes – Dean and E. Rhodes and Leona B. Carpenter Professor of Womanist Ethics and Society
- Willard Uphaus – theologian and pacifist, Director of the World Fellowship Center
- Renita J. Weems – Professor of the Hebrew Bible, writer on religion and race at The Huffington Post

== Notable alumni ==
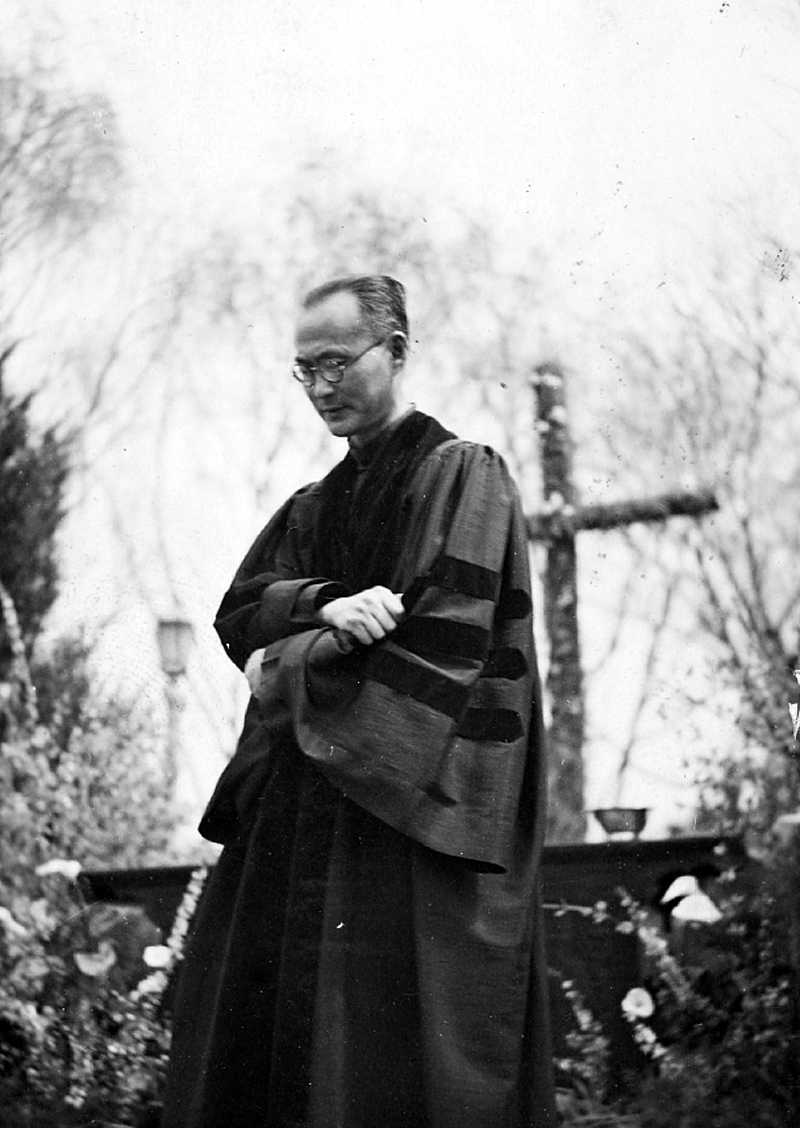
Chinese theologian T. C. Chao (B.D. 1916, M.A. 1917)

Vice President of the United States Al Gore (Rockefeller Scholar 1971-1972)

- Arto Antturi – Finnish Lutheran priest, vicar for the parish of Pitäjänmäki
- Will W. Alexander (B.Th 1912) – Methodist pastor and founder of the Commission on Interracial Cooperation
- Kenneth Lee Carder (D.M. 1980) – United Methodist bishop
- T. C. Chao (M.A., B.D.) – one of the leading Christian theological thinkers in China in the early twentieth century
- Yun Chi-ho (1888-1891) – political activist and thinker during the late 1800s and early 1900s in Joseon Korea
- James L. Crenshaw (Ph.D 1964) – Robert L. Flowers Professor of the Old Testament at Duke University, leading scholar in Old Testament Wisdom literature, Guggenheim Fellow
- Musa Dube (Ph.D 1997) – Botswana feminist theologian, 2011 Humboldt Prize winner
- The Rt. Rev. Robert W. Estill (D.Min 1980) – 9th Bishop of the Episcopal Diocese of North Carolina
- Robert W. Funk (Ph.D 1953) – American biblical scholar, founder of the Jesus Seminar and the nonprofit Westar Institute, Guggenheim Fellow, Fulbright Scholar
- Al Gore (1971–72) – yearlong Rockefeller Foundation scholarship for people planning secular careers
- William M. Greathouse – minister and emeritus general superintendent in the Church of the Nazarene
- William J. Hadden (M.Div 1946) – Episcopal university chaplain, U.S. Army chaplain, U.S. Navy chaplain; desegregationist, World War II's V-12 Navy College Training Program at Vanderbilt
- John Wesley Hardt – Bishop of the United Methodist Church, author, and biographer
- The Rt. Rev. Susan Bunton Haynes (M.Div 1993) – 11th bishop of the Episcopal Diocese of Southern Virginia
- Roy Herron (M.Div 1980) – former chairman of the Tennessee Democratic Party
- William G. Johnsson (Ph.D) – Seventh-day Adventist author, former editor of the Adventist Review
- Howard Kester (B.D. 1931) – clergyman and social reformer, organized the Southern Tenant Farmers Union designed by President Franklin D. Roosevelt
- Yung Suk Kim (Ph.D 2006) – Korean-American biblical scholar and author, editor of peer-reviewed journal, Journal of Bible and Human Transformation and the Journal of Race, Ethnicity, and Religion
- James Lawson (M.Div 1960) – civil rights pioneer
- Mark Noll (Ph.D 1975) – historian, Research Professor of History at Regent College, previously Francis A. McAnaney Professor of History at the University of Notre Dame
- Tat-Siong Benny Liew (Ph.D 1997) – 1956 Chair of New Testament Studies at the College of the Holy Cross
- Carroll D. Osburn (D.Div 1970) – American scholar recognized as one of North America’s leading New Testament textual critics and a prominent Christian egalitarian
- Mitch Pacwa SJ (Ph.D) – bi-ritual American Jesuit priest celebrating liturgy in both the Roman and Maronite rites, president and founder of Ignatius Productions, accomplished linguist
- William Powlas Peery (M.A. 1959) – Pastor of the Andhra Evangelical Lutheran Church in Andhra Pradesh, India, significant figure in South Indian Christianity in the 20th century
- David Penchansky (Ph.D 1988) – scholar of the Hebrew Bible, literary critic to the Old Testament, particularly its Wisdom Literature
- Clare Purcell (B.D. 1916) – Methodist bishop
- Laurel C. Schneider (Ph.D 1997) – Professor of Religious Studies, Religion and Culture at the Vanderbilt Divinity School
- Timothy F. Sedgwick (M.A., Ph.D) – American Episcopal ethicist
- Robert Hitchcock Spain (M.Div.) – United Methodist bishop
- Brock Speer (M.Div) – bass singer for the Speer Family Southern Gospel group
- Ken Stone (M.A. 1992, Ph.D 1995) – author, Chairman of the Reading, Theory and the Bible Section of the Society of Biblical Literature, Lambda Literary Award winner
- Amy Welborn (M.A. in Church History) – Roman Catholic author, columnist, activist, academic and public speaker
- B. Michael Watson (D.M) – bishop of The United Methodist Church
- Sharon D. Welch (Ph.D 1982) – social ethicist and author; Affiliate Faculty, Meadville Lombard Theological School; former Associate Professor, Harvard Divinity School
- Don West (D.Div 1932) – civil rights activist, labor organizer, poet, educator
- Shelli Yoder (M.Div.) – Miss Indiana 1992, former Democratic Party nominee for U.S. Congress (IN-9)

== Student awards and prizes ==
Vanderbilt Divinity School presents annual awards in recognition of the outstanding achievements of its students. These include the Founder’s Medal, awarded to the top-graduating student from each undergraduate and professional school, the Academic Achievement Award, conferred upon a student that has achieved excellence in the pursuit of a master of divinity degree, and the Umphrey Lee Dean’s Award, presented to a student that represents the vision and mission of the school. Also presented are the Florence Conwell Prize, awarded to a degree candidate who has distinguished themselves by outstanding work in the discipline of preaching, the St. James Academy Award who has composed the most outstanding sermon, the W. Kendrick Grobel Award for outstanding achievement in Biblical studies, and the J.D. Owen Prize, awarded for outstanding course work in a Biblical field.

Additionally, the School recognizes students who have upheld its values and commitments to the Wesleyan ideals of servant leadership, student service, and services to the Divinity School community, with the conferral of the McTyeire, Bettye R. Ford Graduate Student Service, and Divinity Student Government Association Service awards, respectively. The School also confers two annual awards in honor of American theologian and writer, Frederick Buechner: one for Excellence in Writing and one for the best master’s thesis in Theological Studies.

Furthermore, the school awards the Robert Lewis Butler Award for service and ministry in the African-American Church, the Disciples Divinity House Scholar award for academic distinction, the Liston O. Mills award for a student who has achieved distinction in the study of pastoral theology, religion, psychology, and culture. Additional awards include the William A. Newcomb Prize, the Nella May Overby Memorial Prize, the Wilbur F. Tillett Prize, the Elliott F. Shepard Prize, and the John Olin Knott Award.

== See also ==
- Wilbur Fisk Tillett (1854-1936), early Dean
