= Jack M. Sasson =

American professor (born 1941)

- Born: October 1, 1941 (age 85); Aleppo, Syria
- Occupations: Mary Jane Werthan Professor of Jewish Studies and Hebrew Bible at Vanderbilt Divinity School
- Board member of: president of the American Oriental Society , president of the International Association for Assyriology

Academic background
- Education: Abraham Lincoln High School, Brooklyn College
- Alma mater: Brandeis University (Ph.D.)
- Thesis: (1966)
- Doctoral advisor: Cyrus Gordon

Academic work
- Discipline: Jewish studies Biblical studies Middle Eastern studies
- Institutions: University of North Carolina at Chapel Hill; Vanderbilt University
- Main interests: Assyriology, Hebrew Scriptures
- Notable works: Judges 1-12 (AYB); Jonah (AYB)

Jack M. Sasson (born October 1, 1941) is the Mary Jane Werthan Professor of Jewish Studies and Hebrew Bible at Vanderbilt Divinity School, Emeritus and previously Professor of Classics at Vanderbilt University. From 1977 to 1999, he was a professor at the University of North Carolina, Chapel Hill. His research focuses primarily on Assyriology and Hebrew Scriptures, writing on the archives from eighteenth century BC found at Mari, Syria, by the Euphrates, near the modern-day Syria-Iraq border as well as on biblical studies.

== Biography ==
Born in Aleppo, Syria, on October 1, 1941, Sasson immigrated to the United States in 1955 after a significant stay in Lebanon where he attended the Alliance Israélite Universelle schools. In the United States, Sasson enrolled in Abraham Lincoln High School in Brooklyn, New York, and then Brooklyn College, which later became a constituent school of the City University of New York college system. He received his B.A. in history in 1962 from Brooklyn College.

Immediately after completing his undergraduate education, Sasson accepted a scholarship to pursue his graduate studies at Brandeis University. At Brandeis, he focused first on Islamic Studies, earning an M.A. in Mediterranean Studies in 1963. He went on to earn his doctorate in Ancient Near Eastern Studies in 1966, writing his dissertation under Cyrus Gordon.

Sasson taught at the University of North Carolina at Chapel Hill, moving up the rank and becoming a full professor of Religious Studies in 1977. In 1991, Sasson was appointed to the prestigious William R. Kenan Chair in Religious Studies where he remained until joining the faculty of Vanderbilt University in 1999. He served as president of the American Oriental Society from 1996 to 1997 and of the International Association for Assyriology from 2005 to 2009. He also established and directed the Jewish Studies program at Vanderbilt University from 2002 to 2005.

== Selected works ==
=== Books ===
- Sasson, Jack M. (1979). Ruth: A New Translation. With a Philological Commentary and a Folkloristic-Formalist Interpretation. Baltimore: The Johns Hopkins University Press.
- ——— (1989). Ruth: A New Translation. With a Philological Commentary and a Folkloristic-Formalist Interpretation. (Revised Edition, with Comments.). Sheffield: Almond Press.
- ——— (1990). Jonah: A New Translation with Introduction and Commentary. Anchor Yale Bible. Yale University Press. ISBN 978-0-300-13970-9.
- ——— (2014). Judges 1-12: A New Translation with Introduction and Commentary. Anchor Yale Bible. Yale University Press. ISBN 978-0-300-19033-5.
- ——— (2015). From the Mari Archives. An Anthology of Old Babylonian Letters. Eisenbrauns. ISBN 978-1-57506-830-5.

=== Articles and chapters ===
- "Absalom's Daughter: An Essay in Vestige Historiography," Journal for the Study of the Old Testament 343 (2001): 179-196.
- "Albright as an Orientalist" The Biblical Archaeologist. 56.1 (1993): 3-7.
- "An Apocalyptic Vision from Mari: Speculations on ARM X:9" Mari: Annales de Recherches Interdisciplinaires. 1 (1982): 151-67.
- "Biographical Notices on Some Royal Ladies from Mari" Journal of Cuneiform Studies. 25.2 (Apr 1973): 59-78.
- "The Blood of Grapes: Viticulture and Intoxication in the Hebrew Bible" Drinking in Ancient Societies; History and Culture of Drinks in the Ancient Near East. Ed. Lucio Milano. Padua: Sargon srl, 1994. 399-419.
- "Bovine Symbolism in the Exodus Narrative" Vetus Testamentum. 18.3 (Jul 1968): 380-7.
- "The Burden of Scribes" Tzi Abusch, ed. Riches Hidden in Secret Places: Studies in Memory of Thorkild Jacobsen. (2002): 211-28.
- "Canaanite Maritime Involvement in the Second Millennium B.C." Journal of the American Oriental Society. 86.2 (1966): 126-138.
- "Divine Providence or Human Plan?" Interpretation. 30 (1976): 415-419.
- "Forcing Morals on Mesopotamian Society" Studies in Honor of Harry A. Hoffner, Jr., on the Occasion of his 65th Birthday. Eds. Gary Beckman Richard Beal, and Gregory McMahon. Winona Lake, IN: Eisenbrauns, 2003. 329-40.
- "Instances of Mobility Among Mari Artisans" Bulletin of the American Schools of Oriental Research. 190 (Apr 1968): 46-54.
- "Isaiah LXVI 3-4a" Vetus Testamentum. 26.2 (1976): 199-207.
- "The King and I: A Mari King in Changing Perceptions" Journal of the American Oriental Society. 118.4 (1998): 453—470.
- "Love's Roots: On the Redaction of Genesis 30:14-24" Love and Death in the Ancient Near East: Essays in Honor of Marvin H. Pope. Eds. John H. Marks and Robert M. Good. Guilford, CT: Four Quarters Publishing Company, 1987. 205-09.
- "A Major Contribution to Song of Songs Scholarship" Journal of the American Oriental Society. 107.4 (1987): 733—739.
- "Mari Dreams" Journal of the American Oriental Society. 103.1 (1983): 283—293.
- "Musical Settings for Cuneiform Literature: A Discography" Journal of the American Oriental Society. 103 (1983): 233-35.
- "Of Time & Immortality: How Genesis Created Them" Bible Review. 21.3 (Summer 2005): 32-41, 52-54.
- "Old Babylonian Tablets from Al-Rimah" Journal of the American Oriental Society. 100.4 (1980): 453-460.
- "On the Use of Images in Israel and the Ancient Near East" Barry M. Gittlin, ed. Sacred Time, Sacred Place: Archaeology and the Religion of Israel. Winona Lake, IN: Eisenbrauns, 2002. 63-70.
- "Oracle Inquiries in Judges" Birkat Shalom: Studies in the Bible, Ancient Near Eastern Literature, and Postbiblical Judaism Presented to Shalom M. Paul on the Occasion of His Seventieth Birthday. Eds. Chaim Cohen Victor A. Hurowitz, Avi Hurvitz, Yochanan Muffs and others. Winona Lake, IN: Eisenbrauns, 2008. 149-68.
- "The Posting of Letters with Divine Messages" Florilegium marianum, 2: Recueil d'études à la mémoire de Maurice Birot [Mémoires de N.A.B.U., 3]. Eds. D. Charpin and J.M. Durand. Paris: Nouvelles assyriologiques Brèves et Utilitaires, 1994. 299-316.
- "The Road to Vanderbilt" The Spire; Vol. 22 No. 01, 2001. 28-32.
- "The Search for the Hebrew God" University of North Carolina, Chapel Hill. 23 Sept 2001. Lecture.
- "The Servant's Tale: How Rebekah Found a Spouse" Journal of Near Eastern Studies. Chicago: Univ of Chicago Press. 65.4 (2006): 241-265.
- "Should Cheeseburgers Be Kosher?" Bible Review. 19.6 (Dec 2003): 41-43, 50-51.
- "Sketch of North Syrian Economic Relations in the Middle Bronze Age" Journal of the Economic and Social History of the Orient. 9.3 (Dec 1966): 161-81.
- "Thoughts of Zimri-Lim" Biblical Archaeologist. 47.2 (June 1984): 110-20.
- "The Treatment of Criminals at Mari: A Survey" Journal of the Economic and Social History of the Orient. 20.1 (Jan 1977): 90-113.
- "Untold Stories: The Bible and Ugaritic Studies in the Twentieth Century" Jewish Quarterly Review. 93.1/2 (2002): 314-316.
- "Utopian and Dystopian Images in Mari Prophetic Texts" Utopia and Dystopia in Prophetic Literature. Ed. Ehud Ben Zvi. Helsinki: Finnish Exegetical Society, 2006. 27-40.
- "Who Cut Samson's Hair? (And Other Trifling Issues Raised by Judges 16" Prooftexts. 8.3 (1988): 333-339.
- "Year: Zimri-Lim Dedicated His Statue to Addu of Halab, Locating One Year in Zimri-Lim's Reign" Mari: Annales de Recherches Interdisciplinaires. 5 (1987): 577-89.
- "Year: Zimri-Lim Offered a Great Throne to Shamash of Mahanum: An Overview of One Year in Mari, Part 1: The Presence of the King" Mari: Annales de Recherches Interdisciplinaires. 4 (1985): 437-52.
- "Zimri-Lim Takes the Grand Tour" Biblical Archaeologist. 47.4 (1984): 246-52.
- "Zimri-Lim's Letter to Tish-ulme" Nouvelles assyriologiques Brèves et Utilitaires. 3.116 (1989): 91-92.
