= Eugene TeSelle =

American church historian (1931–2018)

Eugene Arthur TeSelle
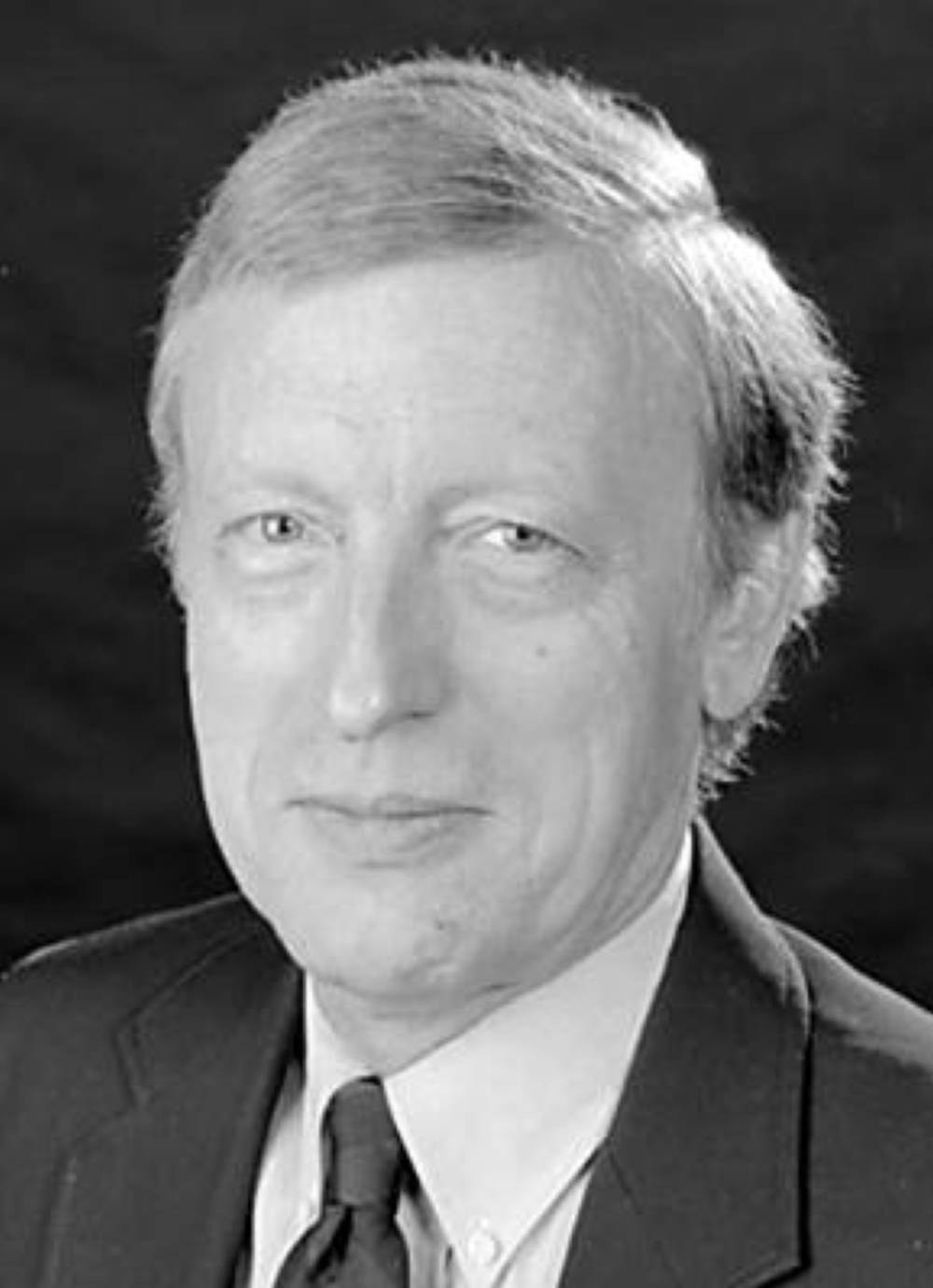
- Eugene TeSelle in 1994
- Born: August 8, 1931; Ames, Iowa, U.S.
- Died: March 1, 2018 (aged 86); Nashville

Academic background
- Education: University of Colorado, Boulder; Princeton Theological Seminary; Yale University

Academic work
- Discipline: Church history
- School or tradition: Catholic church history; Augustine
- Institutions: Vanderbilt University

Eugene Arthur TeSelle (August 8, 1931 – March 1, 2018) was an American academic, church historian, and community activist. He was born in Ames, IA, the son of Eugene Arthur TeSelle, a dairy plant supervisor and technician (and for a short period, the owner of TeSelle Dairy), and Hildegarde Flynn TeSelle. The family lived in Nebraska and Ohio, then in Colorado Springs, Salida, and Greeley, CO. He had one sister, Ellen TeSelle Boal.

TeSelle earned his B.A. from the University of Colorado at Boulder in 1952, finishing in 3 years. He then went on to Princeton Theological Seminar to earn a B.D. (Bachelor of Divinity) in 1955 and to Yale University Divinity School, where he earned an M.A. in 1960 and a Ph.D. in 1963.

He taught at Yale Department of Religious Studies (prior to 1969) before joining Vanderbilt Divinity School, in which he became Oberlin Professor of Church History and Theology. In November 2018, an overpass of Interstate 440 was named after TeSelle, who had campaigned against the highway.

TeSelle married Sallie McFague in 1959. They had two children, Elizabeth (born 1962) and John (born 1964). They were divorced in 1976. In 1978, TeSelle married Penny Saunders Peatman, to whom he was married until his death.

== Works ==
- TeSelle, Eugene (2002) [1970]. Augustine the Theologian. Wipf and Stock Publishers. ISBN 978-1-57910-918-9.
- TeSelle, Eugene (1974). Augustine's Strategy as an Apologist. Augustinian Institute, Villanova University.
- TeSelle, Eugene (1975). Christ in Context: Divine Purpose and Human Possibility. Fortress Press. ISBN 978-0-8006-0282-6.
- TeSelle, Eugene (1988). Thomas Aquinas: Faith and Reason. Graded Press. ISBN 978-0-939697-53-3.
- TeSelle, Eugene (1998). Living in two cities: Augustinian trajectories in political thought. University of Scranton Press. ISBN 978-0-940866-68-3.
