= World Fellowship Center =

Conference center

Coordinates: 43°55′52″N 71°13′10″W

The World Fellowship Center is a 501(c)(3) nonprofit organization, retreat and intergenerational conference center located in Albany, New Hampshire, United States. It is open between June and September, with most of its scheduled summer program commencing shortly after June solstice and concluding on or shortly after Labor Day weekend. A few workshops and other events take place before or afterwards. Nestled at the southeastern edge of the White Mountain National Forest, directly east of Mount Chocorua off Route 16 in Albany, it currently comprises approximately 455 acres (184 ha), including a conference room and dining lodge, nature trails, soccer field, several cabins, campsites and additional lodging facilities, as well as boating and swimming access on a large pond. At full capacity it can host over 150 guests and staff. Since its inception it has featured speakers, groups, organizations, activists, artists and entertainers from around the world.

== History ==
=== 1929 - 1952: In a Time of War, Prepare for Peace ===
The name "World Fellowship" is derived from the World Fellowship of Faiths, which was officially established as an organization in 1929. In 1937, shortly before the outbreak of World War II, activist, philanthropist, suffragist, and feminist Lola Maverick Lloyd (1875–1944) propounded the notion of world government, essentially a forerunner to the United Nations, whereby nation-states would be dissolved and there would be one democratically elected government of all people. Lloyd saw the League of Nations, created in late 1918 in the aftermath of World War I, as doomed to fail since it was dominated by the very same war-mongering nations that supported the first World War. It was Lloyd's colleague, Charles Frederick Weller (1870–1957), who had been a speechwriter for Theodore Roosevelt, and Weller's wife Eugenia (née Winston, 1872–1956), who first conceived the idea of a summer retreat and conference center devoted to peace and social justice issues and causes some time in the late 1930s. The year 1940 proved to be paramount for the Weller couple - with much of the world engulfed in war, their adult son died. Shortly thereafter, Charles embarked on a 15-day-long meditation and fast on nearby Mount Whiteface, during which he conceived the notion of creating a more permanent place for the World Fellowship of Faiths. Afterwards, Charles and Eugenia selected a 290-acre (120 ha) plot known as the Draper Estate, located in Albany, which was for sale for $5,000. After making a down payment of $500, the Wellers contacted Lloyd and requested her to pay $2,500; many additional, smaller contributions were amassed in the purchase of the land. Despite the name "World Fellowship of Faiths," World Fellowship has never been officially aligned or affiliated with any religious denomination. The first official year of operation was summer 1941, during which an attendance of 253 people was recorded. The initial theme/mission statement was "In a time of war, prepare for peace." The Wellers assumed the position of directorship for the first twelve summers, from 1941 to 1952. Shortly thereafter, Eugenia died in 1956 at 84, and Charles in 1957 at 86.

=== 1953 - 1969: Uphaus vs. Wyman ===
In August 1952, Willard Uphaus (1890–1983), a retired Methodist theologian and pacifist, and his wife Ola (née Hawkins) Uphaus (1897–1972), a social worker, first visited, and became directors in June 1953. Uphaus had previously been fired from Hastings College in Nebraska in 1930 for advocating radical viewpoints, and he remained committed to a pacifist philosophy during World War II. In September of that year, a series of articles published by Greg Abbott in the Manchester Union Leader (New Hampshire's only statewide newspaper) maligned Uphaus by branding him as a Communist. The Union Leader had been acquired in 1946 by arch-conservative publisher William Loeb III, and would be used successfully by Loeb to set New Hampshire's political stage for decades to come. Subsequently, in early 1954, with the Red Scare and McCarthyism in full swing, Governor Hugh Gregg, invoking the New Hampshire Subversive Activities Act of 1951, directed Attorney General Louis Wyman to issue a summons for Uphaus mandating that he surrender a list of all attendees and all employees of the World Fellowship Center, out of suspicion that World Fellowship may have had connections to the Communist Party, or was itself a Communist organization. Uphaus steadfastly refused to comply with these demands on the grounds that as a practicing Christian, to do so would be to bear false witness. Additionally, Uphaus felt that such an act would violate and jeopardize the civil rights and liberties of innocent people. This act of resistance commenced a five-year long legal battle that involved numerous subpoenas and appeals. In an attempt to clarify what the Attorney General's demands were (since World Fellowship already had a publicly accessible guest list for tax purposes) Uphaus visited Wyman at his office in Concord in the spring of 1954 in an unsuccessful attempt to persuade Wyman that any additional list of names would be unreasonable, unnecessary and a breach of professional integrity. In September 1958, the case eventually made its to way the United States Supreme Court, which ruled 5–4 in June 1959 in favor of the Attorney General. In December of that year Uphaus was sentenced to a year in jail for contempt of court. The sentence lasted from December 14, 1959, to December 13, 1960. Uphaus would chronicle these events in his book "Commitment." The Uphaus couple remained directors until 1969. Ola died in 1972 at 75, and Willard in 1983 at 92.

=== 1970 - 2000: Growth, Inward and Outward ===
In 1966, Katheryn "Kit" Schmauch (née Hively, b. 1933) and her husband Christoph Schmauch (né Werner Schmauch - b. 1935) first visited and agreed to take on the role of directorship in 1969, assuming full responsibility in 1970. Kit, a teacher, was from Columbus, Ohio; Christoph was a Lutheran minister from Breslau, East Germany, who had immigrated to the United States in the late 1950s. They had four children when they assumed the position, and have had by far the longest tenure of directorship to date. In the over 30 years that they were involved with World Fellowship, they successfully transformed it from a small-scale and relatively obscure conference center to a moderate-sized and internationally known counter-cultural haven by making numerous expansions, additions, capital and social improvements and liaisons with other politically inspired networks and organizations, both throughout both the U.S. and Europe. These included the purchase of 135 acres (55 ha) and the construction of bunkhouse dormitories and other lodging facilities for seasonal workers, as well as the construction of a year-round Cape house for the directors. They instituted a stipend for employees (prior to that, all wages were based on tips left by guests); purchased laundry facilities; upgraded and expanded the kitchen (prior to their arrival the galley kitchen, which is currently the guest kitchen, was where all meals except breakfast were prepared); installed commercial-scale refrigerators; drilled an artesian well on site; arranged for weekly trash collection; constructed a wide variety of recreational facilities such as a basketball court, volleyball court, and soccer field; and added numerous rowboats, canoes and an additional raft to the swimming area of the pond. With the acquired acreage, they blazed nature trails for hiking and established weekly guided nature walks. They expanded the program to include a children's fellowship, and for each week of the summer to have a different theme with several guest lecturers invited to speak about various issues pertaining to peace and social justice. In terms of staff networking, the Schmauchs introduced numerous people from Europe to World Fellowship without ever using outside advertising. They remained co-directors through the 2000 season; afterwards, they lived in nearby Conway until the 2010s, subsequently relocating to Columbus, Ohio.

=== 2001 - 2019: Where Social Justice Meets Nature ===
In May 2000, Andrew Davis (born 1961) and Andrea Walsh (born 1962), a married couple living with their daughter at the time in Keene, New Hampshire became directors. During their tenure, they labored to increase the presence, visibility, and attendance rates of people of color, and transgender/genderqueer/non-binary people, as well as upgrade the lodging facilities to comply with fire safety regulations and improve accessibility to alter-abled people. They also made the buildings more energy efficient and worked with nearby farms to have more produce delivered on site. With regards to program changes, they expanded the season to include weddings in June and September and created more programs, venues, opportunities and workshops pertaining to the visual arts and body movement (such as yoga, Capoeira Angola and Feldenkrais). In 2007, they established a recreation coordinator position to arrange daily cycling excursions in the surrounding area in the morning as well as hiking expeditions in the nearby mountains in the afternoon. The recreation coordinator position lasted through the summer of 2022.

=== 2021 - Present: Times of Transition and Uncertainty ===
In spring 2020, amidst the COVID-19 global pandemic, the World Fellowship board of trustees made the decision not to open for the summer. This marked the first time in World Fellowship's 80-year history that on-site activities did not occur. As a result, all programming was conducted via teleconferencing. In early 2021, the board decided to open facilities with limited programming and follow state and federally mandated social distancing guidelines. Additionally, in spring of 2021, Octavia Driscoll (born 1986), living and working in New York City at the time, was hired as the director, succeeding the Davis-Walsh couple. Driscoll's tenure commenced in January 2022; however, in June of that same year, she submitted her resignation, effective December 31. Shortly thereafter, in early 2023, an interim management committee consisting of five volunteers was formed to take on the role of directorship. In April 2023, Megan Chapman (born 1981) and Andrew Maki (born 1983), a married couple working as human rights lawyers in Lagos, Nigeria with their young children, were hired as the next co-directors. Their tenure began in August 2023, working alongside the interim management committee. In 2024, their first summer as co-directors, they established a social justice institute, consisting mostly of young activists and established weekly book club readings.

== Governance ==
The governing body of World Fellowship is a board of trustees, composed of nine to twelve members, each of whom serves a three-year term. The board meets with the co-directors throughout the year to oversee the work of the non-profit organization. The decision-making process is conducted via majority rule.

== Workstaff ==
The work crew is hired personally by the directors each year in the spring, usually between March and May. Every employee has a different length of stay, depending on how long they are able to commit, though there are a few year-round positions who work alongside the directors. In the past, workers were paid wages below the state and federal threshold but were compensated by not having to pay for their room and board; currently they are paid higher than federal minimum wage. Most workers are housed in the dorms on-site and work as general staff - alternating daily between housekeeping, dining crew and/or dish pot teams; there are also a few staff hired to do specific tasks (such as farm crew and special projects/maintenance). Additionally, there is a set of staff hired to be the established manager of a particular crew, such as lodge manager, dining hall manager and office manager. Finally, there is also one staff co-ordinator who collaborates with the directors in terms of staff oversight. As World Fellowship has a small budget for outside communication and other outreach, almost all staff are acquired through word-of-mouth. As a result, many of the employees have either familial or other close connections to long-time attendees, though there are also some foreign employees who have obtained visas or other temporary work permits.

== Landscape and buildings ==
On the World Fellowship main site there is Lloyd Lodge (built in various stages from the 19th century onwards), the primary lodging facility, which has a commercial-sized kitchen, a dining hall, a galley kitchen, eighteen guest rooms and seven full-bathrooms, two half-bathrooms, and an alter-abled accessible showering facility, two screened-in porches and a veranda, a parlor, and a conference room (referred to as the old conference room), which has a library and fireplace. In addition to the old conference room, there is a one-room building (Schmauch House), constructed in the late 1990s, which currently functions as the primary conference and discussion room. Schmauch house is reached via an engraved brick pathway, completed in the late 2000s from donations from numerous guests, and has a nearby composting toilet and memorial wall (featuring the headstones of several guests). Also on site are a gazebo, picnic tables, a firepit, outdoor grill, basketball and volleyball courts, a chalet, a cistern, a playground, two dormitories, a rope swing, a private cabin, and chicken coop adjacent to an enclosure that housed Saanens used for cheesemaking between 2008 and 2015. Just south of the main site entrance is a Cape Cod house, constructed between 2000 and 2001. Originally referred to as simply 'the cape,' it was officially renamed the Davis-Walsh house in summer 2023, and features five guest rooms and two bathrooms. Starting in fall of 2023, the cape may be rented to visiting groups and/or individual travelers year-round. Prominently featured in numerous photographs taken on site is a sizable granite boulder (typically referred to as "peace rock") encircled by a flower garden, and a peace pole with a superb view of the eastern face of nearby Mount Chocorua.

Located a quarter of a mile southwest along Drake Hill Road is Uphaus Lodge. Uphaus offers the most modern lodging quarters, and contains a library, nine guest rooms and laundry facilities. Adjacent to it are vegetable garden beds. Nearly a mile farther southwest, close to the southern entrance on Route 16, there is a cottage, a soccer field, and Weller House. This colonial-style house, purchased in 1958 but built in the early 19th century (c. 1820), is currently the oldest building on site since the demolition of the farmhouse. The primary parking lot is surrounded by several campsites, which provide the most economical lodging options. Just beyond the campsite area, there are the nature trails, which start out as one trail, diverging to the right after approximately a tenth of mile into a self-guided 1.25 mile loop with considerable elevation gain featuring 20 stopping points. The other trail, approximately .6 miles in length, leads directly to the swimming and boating areas of Whitton Pond, crossing two footbridges and is relatively even terrain. Whitton Pond, which covers approximately 164 acres (66 ha) and has a maximum of depth of 57 feet (17 m) extends over the town border of Madison, has several islands and abuts numerous neighboring properties. As the pond has remained under-developed with very few settlements, coupled with the fact that it is free of motor boats, it is a prime location for swimming, canoeing, kayaking, rowing, fishing, berry-picking and bird-watching for both guests, townsfolk, and other nearby residents.

For much of World Fellowship's existence there was a large 18th-century farmhouse (unnamed, and simply referred to as "the farmhouse") across from the soccer field and cottage that functioned as lodging quarters with over a dozen rooms, and, in the early days, a dining parlor where breakfast was served prior to the Schmauch era (a prominent sign proclaimed it "the Albany Coffeehouse" as well). Immediately adjacent is Whitman Hall, which was previously used as a performance venue and is now used as a storage facility. During the winter of 2007–2008, the farmhouse building incurred numerous damages necessitating a variety of costly electrical and other repairs; subsequently the board of trustees voted to discontinue it as a lodging facility in 2008. In 2009, the decision was made to have the farmhouse demolished completely in the spring of 2010. As a result, beginning in 2008, off-site cabins located farther northeast on Drake Hill Road were rented, and in the following years, beginning in 2010, a small plot of forested land adjacent the main parking lot was cleared, and two cabins were built between 2016 and 2018. During this time, an additional capital campaign was launched to have a large bathhouse and additional cabins constructed in the vicinity.

Drake Hill Road, upon which all World Fellowship facilities are located, forms an approximately 2.8-mile-long (4.5 km) curved tangent to Route 16 and provides access to the site via Route 16 from both the south (close to mile marker 69) and the north (close to mile marker 72). The World Fellowship welcome sign on the southern (primary) entrance off Route 16 has been defaced and damaged (by graffiti, gunshot and Molotov cocktail) on several occasions during the time that the World Fellowship Center has existed, reflecting the strained relationship World Fellowship has had with the nearby communities in past decades. During Uphaus's period of directorship, the sign included the phrase, "All Races Welcome", thereby occasionally attracting people of color who happened to be passing through in an otherwise overwhelmingly white region. In decades subsequent, particularly the 1960s and 1970s, World Fellowship was seen both externally and internally as a safe-haven for radicals who expressed socialist, Marxist, and/or other revolutionary viewpoints - this stood in stark contrast to the rest of Carroll County, which was overwhelmingly conservative. In recent years, most tensions have eased, and interactions and relations between World Fellowship and the surrounding towns and communities have generally been civil.

== Ecology ==
At an elevation of approximately 900 feet (270 m) above sea level (with the highest point on site being just under 1,000 feet (300 m)), the forest ecosystem on site is typical of the northern New England/Acadian forests biome with conifers such as the eastern white pine (Pinus strobus) and eastern hemlock (Tsuga canadensis) interspersed with hardwoods such as American beech (Fagus grandifolia), a few species of birch (mostly paper/Betula papyrifera and yellow/gray/Betula alleghaniensis), several species of maple (such as sugar/Acer saccharum, red/Acer rubrum and striped/Acer pensylvanicum), oak (almost entirely the northern red oak/Quercus rubra), and ash (mostly white ash/Fraxinus americana). Less common hardwoods include quaking aspen (Populus tremuloides) as well as pin (Prunus pensylvanica) and choke (Prunus virginiana) cherry; less common conifers include balsam fir (Abies balsamea), black (Picea mariana) and red (Picea rubens) spruce, northern white-cedar (Thuja occidentalis) and red pine (Pinus resinosa). The understory consists of such shrubs and other ground plants include wintergreen/teaberry (Gaultheria procumbens), at least two species of haw (Viburnum acerifolium and Viburnum lantanoides), and Virginia creeper (Parthenocissus quinquefolia); dogbane (Apocynum androsaemifolium), several species of blueberry (genus Vaccinium), as well as several species of aster (family Asteraceae). Other forest-dwelling plants include Indian pipe (Monotropa uniflora) and lady slipper (Cypripedium parviflorum). In the wetland and aquatic areas of the property, water lily (family Nymphaeaceae), loosestrife (genus Lythrum), purple pitcher plant (Sarracenia purpurea) and various species of pickerelweed (family Pontederiaceae) abound.

Fauna include several species of rodents such as eastern gray squirrel (Sciurus carolinensis) and eastern chipmunk (Tamias striatus). Amphibians such as the toad (genus Bufo), spring peeper (Pseudacris crucifer) and bullfrog (Lithobates catesbeianus), and reptiles such as a few species of snake have been observed. Numerous passerine and songbirds such as the titmouse (Baeolophus bicolor), purple finch (Haemorhous purpureus), red-eyed vireo (Vireo olivaceus), black-capped chickadee (Poecile atricapillus), jays/crows (family Corvidae), wren (family Troglodytidae), kinglet (family Regulidae), warbler (family Parulidae), dove (family Columbidae), woodpecker (family Picidae) and thrush (family Turdidae) have been spotted. Birds of prey encountered include owls, especially the barred owl (Strix varia), and hawks (mostly genus Buteo). Throughout the day, but most frequently during the crepuscular and pre-dawn hours, the trill and tremolo of the common loon (Gavia immer) can be heard on the pond. Far less frequently encountered, but occasionally reported, are sights of black bear (Ursus americanus), North American porcupine (Erethizon dorsatum), white-tailed deer (Odocoileus virginianus), common raccoon (Procyon lotor), fisher (Pekania pennanti) and moose (Alces alces).

Fungi commonly encountered on site include several species of Amanita (family Amanitaceae), Hydnum (family Hydnaceae), milk-caps (genus Lactarius) and a variety of other genera, prominent among which include Cortinarius, Leccinum, Lepiota, Fomitopsis, Collybia, Hericium, Clavulina, Russula, and Suillus. Some of these are known to be edible (such as chicken-of-the-woods Laetiporus sulphureus) and have been included in annual 'fungal forays' led by a trained mycologist.

In August 2019, 400 of World Fellowship's 455 acres were officially put into a conservation easement through the local Upper Saco Valley Land Trust (named after Kit Schmauch, who originally had the vision to do so) to ensure that they will remain undeveloped indefinitely.

== Room nomenclature ==
In keeping with World Fellowship's mission statement and commitment to honoring activists, most lodging facilities (except Uphaus Lodge) have rooms that are named after historical figures committed to social justice and/or peace-related causes. Some of these were actual guests - such as economist, pacifist and author Scott Nearing, and architect and suffragist Florence Luscomb. Some of the other figures to have rooms named after them include Lola Maverick Lloyd, Henry David Thoreau (two separate rooms - Henry Thoreau and David Thoreau are named in his honor), Frederick Douglass (the 19th-century African-American orator and anti-slavery activist) and Louise Pettibone Smith (a 20th-century activist and theologian). The Schmauchs have a lodging room and a separate conference room named in their honor; the Weller and Uphaus couple have entire houses named after them. The Larry Katz and Jacobs family cabins, completed in the summer of 2018, were named in honor of long time guests who made substantial charitable contributions. Most of the other lodging rooms are either oriented numerically (the terrace of Lloyd Lodge features seven so-named rooms) or by cardinal directions (such as east/west single, north/west porch). Even some of the bathrooms in the Lloyd Lodge are named after either local destinations or prominent landmarks in Boston and New York City.

== Programs and offerings ==
The current weekly program typically features guest lecturers weekday mornings and evenings, book club readings and discussions every Tuesday afternoon, campfires with smores every Wednesday night, cookouts on Thursday evening, a talent show Friday night, musical and/or dance venues Saturday night, a luncheon featuring a Thanksgiving-style turkey dinner every Sunday afternoon, and a leftover smorgasbord Sunday night. Options of vegetarian, vegan and/or gluten-free (as well as other dietary restrictions/special needs) meals are available upon request. Most salad greens come directly from the gardens, and bread and other baked goods are baked daily in the kitchen. The rest of the food is delivered weekly by various corporate distributors (mostly Sysco), though there has been an effort to have more food purchased locally; and in years past some of the turkeys prepared for the Sunday luncheon were raised in nearby farms. While no alcohol is sold on site, guests and staff alike who are of legal age are free to consume alcoholic beverages (purchased externally) at their own discretion. Snacks are sold each weeknight and ice cream on weekend nights. Quiet hours are enforced between 11 PM and 7 AM in the buildings where guests stay. Each morning at breakfast, announcements are made by the directors regarding the daily weather forecast as well as the upcoming program. Most weekly themes pertain to political issues, identity politics, environmentalism, human rights issues, police abolition and/or accountability, racism and/or race relations, or other causes pertaining to peace and social justice causes; a few weeks are devoted to musical venues, soccer, Capoeira Angola, or other non-political topics. Since 2023, at least one weekend has featured a 'bio-blitz', whereby local/regional ecologists and mycologists give tours of the site, identifying the numerous plants and fungi on site.

== Notable guests ==
Over the course of World Fellowship's existence, a variety of academics, activists, artists, authors, journalists, musicians, organizers, politicians, and story-tellers have attended. These have included Noam Chomsky, Aviva Chomsky (his daughter), Peter Marcuse (son of Herbert Marcuse), Robert Meeropol (son of Julius and Ethel Rosenberg), Scott and Helen Nearing, David Dellinger, Congressman John Lewis (when he was involved with Student Nonviolent Coordinating Committee, well before his term in Congress), Bernie Sanders (when he was mayor of Burlington - long before he gained national and international recognition), Vermont lieutenant governor David Zuckerman, Mindi Messmer, Mab Segrest, Lynne Stewart, Medea Benjamin, Chuck Collins, Steve Schwerner (brother of slain civil rights activist Michael Schwerner), Steve Ellner, Kathy Kelly, Frida Berrigan (daughter of Philip Berrigan and Elizabeth McAlister, niece of Daniel Berrigan), Robert Reynolds Cushing as well several other associates of the Clamshell Alliance - an anti-nuclear organization that opposed the construction of the Seabrook Station Nuclear Power Plant in the mid-1970s. Painter and visual artist Robert Shetterly, who created a portrait series entitled, "Americans Who Tell the Truth" in 2002, exhibits some of his paintings throughout Lloyd Lodge annually. Some notable entertainment venues have included David Rovics, Charlie King, Bev Grant and the Brooklyn Women's Chorus, Sol y Canto, Alisa Amador, the Adam Ezra group, Pamela Means, Tomás Rodriguez, Peter Blood and Annie Patterson (who compiled the Rise Up Singing songbook); as well as numerous other musicians and performers of various genres from throughout the U.S. and abroad.

== Rituals, traditions and mission statement ==
A longstanding tradition involved staff (and, at times, guests) accessing of the island in Whitton Pond (which is known as 'blueberry island' due to its abundance of blueberry bushes) to have outdoor parties and/or sleepovers. As the World Fellowship Center does not legally own this island and the owners raised objections thereto, this tradition has been discontinued as of the mid-2000s. Since the soccer field was constructed in 1995, at least one week of the summer (usually the last few days of July and first few days of August) is devoted to daily soccer games when weather permits. Since 1996, the very first week of the summer season in late June is referred to as early music week, which involves musical performances by musicians playing instruments dating from the Renaissance and Baroque time periods. Periodically, a 'fungal foray' involving the identification of numerous mushrooms and other fungi on site was led by Lawrence Millman. In 2015, one week in July was established as "Ukulele Week", attracting numerous players of said instrument. It is not known exactly when the first cookout, first fun night/talent show, or first Thanksgiving luncheon were initiated, but each has taken place every Thursday evening, Friday evening and Sunday afternoon respectively throughout nearly the entire summer. The mission statement and motto have changed at least twice: During World War II it was "in a time of war, prepare for peace"; this became "rustic, but adequate" during the Weller and/or Uphaus periods. The current mission statement is "to promote peace and social justice through education and dialogue inspired by nature"; this is often simplified to "where peace and social justice meets nature."
