= J. Robert Nelson =

American theologian (1920–2004)

- Born: John Robert Nelson; August 21, 1920; Winona Lake, Indiana, U.S.
- Died: July 6, 2004 (aged 83); Houston, Texas, U.S.
- Education: DePauw University; Yale University; University of Zurich
- Occupations: Methodist theologian, academic administrator, ethicist
- Spouse: Patricia Mercer
- Children: 2

J. Robert Nelson (August 21, 1920 – July 6, 2004) was an American Methodist theologian, academic administrator, and ethicist. He was the dean of the Vanderbilt University Divinity School from 1957 to 1960, and a professor of ecumenism at Boston University School of Theology from 1965 to 1984. He was the author of several books and published research about the relationship between cloning and Christian ethics.

== Early life ==
John Robert Nelson was born on August 21, 1920, in Winona Lake, Indiana. He grew up in River Forest, Illinois and was educated in Evanston, Illinois. He graduated from DePauw University in 1941. He earned a bachelor of divinity from Yale University in 1944, and a PhD from the University of Zurich in 1951.

== Career ==
Nelson was ordained as a Methodist minister in 1944. He was a chaplain in the United States Marine Corps in the Far East from 1944 to 1946. He attended the 1948 World Council of Churches and supported ecumenism throughout his life. He was the author and editor of several books. In 1952, he edited The Christian Student and the Church, The Christian Student and the World Struggle, and The Christian Student and the University, a trilogy of essay collections about issues relevant to Christian students. In 1971, he edited a volume about Willem Visser 't Hooft, the first secretary general of the World Council of Churches; in a review for the Journal of Church and State, James Breckenridge called it "a stimulating collection of essays".

Nelson was the dean of the Vanderbilt University Divinity School from 1957 to 1960. Nelson initially believed the stories published by Vanderbilt trustee James Geddes Stahlman's newspaper, The Nashville Banner, about Civil Rights activist James Lawson, who was a student at the school, which suggested Lawson was inciting others to "violate the law", were misleading. However, when Lawson was expelled by Chancellor Harvie Branscomb, Nelson resigned in protest. With three of his colleagues, Nelson "paid Lawson's $500 bail when he was arrested on charges of conspiracy to violate state laws the day after his expulsion".

Nelson served as one of the interim deans of Boston University School of Theology, following the retirement of Walter George Muelder, during the period 1972 to 1977. In the 1970s, he published research about the relationship between cloning and Christian ethics. He became the president of the Institute of Religion in Houston in 1985.

== Personal life and death ==
Nelson married Patricia Mercer in 1945. They had two sons.

Nelson died of cancer on July 6, 2004, in Houston, Texas. His funeral was held at the St. Paul's United Methodist Church in Houston. His papers are held at the Jean and Alexander Heard Library on the campus of Vanderbilt University.

== Selected works ==
- Nelson, J. Robert, ed. (1951). The Realm of Redemption. London: Epworth Press. OCLC 3390030.
- Nelson, J. Robert, ed. (1952). The Christian Student and the University. New York: Association Press. OCLC 1106738.
- Nelson, J. Robert, ed. (1952). The Christian Student and the Church. New York: Association Press. OCLC 1942614.
- Nelson, J. Robert, ed. (1952). The Christian Student and the World Struggle. New York: Association Press. OCLC 808551.
- Nelson, J. Robert (1962). Criterion for the Church. New York: Abingdon. OCLC 155141942.
- Nelson, J. Robert, ed. (1971). No Man Is Alien: Essays on the Unity of Mankind. Leiden: E.J. Brill. OCLC 496035132.
- Nelson, J. Robert (1984). Human Life: A Biblical Perspective for Bioethics. Philadelphia, Pennsylvania: Fortress Press. ISBN 9780800617547. OCLC 9684882.
- Nelson, J. Robert, ed. (1992). Life as Liberty, Life as Trust. Grand Rapids, Michigan: W.B. Eerdmans. ISBN 9780802806376. OCLC 25412351.
