= John Keith Benton =

American theologian and university administrator

- Born: May 24, 1896; Banks, Alabama
- Died: August 21, 1956 (aged 60); Nashville, Tennessee
- Education: Birmingham–Southern College; Yale University; University of Edinburgh
- Occupations: Theologian, academic
- Spouse: Edna Lois Cooper

John Keith Benton (May 24, 1896 – August 21, 1956) was an American theologian and university administrator. He served as the Dean of the Vanderbilt University Divinity School from 1939 to 1956.

== Early life ==
John Keith Benton was born on May 24, 1896, in Banks, Alabama. His father was Arthur Franklin Benton and his mother, Martha Frederick.

Benton graduated from Birmingham–Southern College, where he received a bachelor of arts degree. He received a bachelor of divinity degree from Yale University, followed by a PhD from Edinburgh University in Scotland.

== Career ==
Benton was a professor of Philosophy and Psychology at Drew University in the 1930s.

Benton served as the Dean of the Divinity School at Vanderbilt University in Nashville, Tennessee from 1939 to 1956. In 1951, he rejected the application of the first black student at Vanderbilt University, only to accept him in 1953 with the caveat that he was not granted all the privileges afforded to other students. He was not allowed to have access to the dorms but was able to eat in university dining facilities when accompanied by a faculty member. During that period, in 1952, he had been asked by Chancellor Harvie Branscomb (1894–1998) to look at the admission policies of other theological schools in the South. Two days after the delivery of that report, Benton forwarded a letter to the university chancellor containing a resolution adopted at a School of Religion faculty meeting on the previous day, which stated "...if the practices of the School are to be in accord with this Christian gospel the fellowship and instruction of the School should be open to qualified students without reference to their race or color"

Benton served as the Executive Secretary of the American Association of Theological Schools. He was elected President of the American Association of Theological Seminaries in 1950. Additionally, he was a Fellow of the National Council on Religion in Higher Education.

In 1949, he received an Honorary Doctor of Divinity from Southern Methodist University in Dallas, Texas.

== Personal life ==
Benton married Edna Lois Cooper (1907–1999). The wedding took place at the First Methodist Church of Lubbock, Texas. They honeymooned in New Mexico and Colorado. They resided in Madison, New Jersey, before they moved to Nashville.

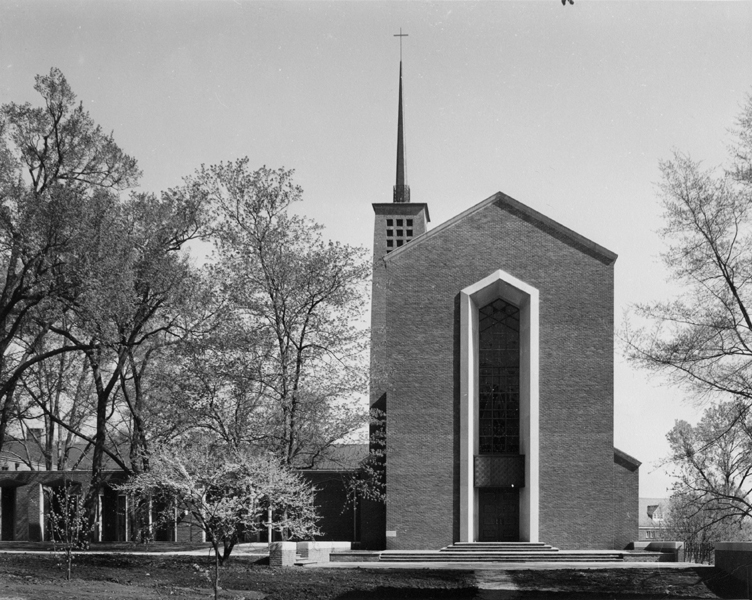
Benton Chapel

== Death and legacy ==
Benton died on August 21, 1956, in Nashville, Tennessee.

The Benton Chapel on the campus of Vanderbilt University is named in his honor. It was built in 1959 as part of the John Frederick Oberlin Divinity Quadrangle.

== Bibliography ==
- Recent Psychological Theories of the Origin of Religion (Edinburgh, Scotland: Edinburgh University Press, 1933).
- Communion Table Dismissals (Nashville, Tennessee: Abingdon Press, 1941).
