= Nels F. S. Ferré =

Swedish theologian (1908-1971)

- Born: June 8, 1908; Luleå, Sweden
- Died: 1971 (aged 62–63)
- Education: Boston University
- Occupation: Theologian
- Notable work: The Christian Faith
- Spouse: Katharine Louise Pond

Nels Fredrick Solomon Ferré was a Christian theologian born in Luleå, Sweden on June 8, 1908.

== Life ==
Nels F. S. Ferré was born in Sweden in 1908 to Maria Wickman Ferré and Frans August Ferré and emigrated to The United States alone at age 13. Upon his arrival on Ellis Island, he was detained and later joined his brother in St. Paul Minnesota where he would work for a family farm. In 1931 he graduated with his undergrad from Boston University. In 1932, Ferré married Katharine Louise Pond. With his interest in philosophy and theology, Ferré would pursue a D.B. degree at Andover Newton, graduating with the class of 1934. He would go on to receive his A.M. and Ph.D. degrees from Harvard University in 1936 and 1938 respectively.

== Career ==
From 1937 to 1950 Ferré taught as a professor at Andover Newton Seminary and from 1950-1957 he was a professor at Vanderbilt University at the School of Religion. From 1957 to 1964, Ferré returned to Andover. Ferré published many books on Christian theology in his career. The common theme of his books was love being the primary category of life. He believed this due to his immense belief in God and belief that God is love. His work primarily revolved around his belief in God and how he interpreted the views of Christianity. In 1958, his book titled "Christ and the Christian" brought a lot of controversy over concepts such as the virgin birth. Those who didn't support him went out and protested. These people took actions such as radio attacks, burning effigies of Ferré, and even pulling speaking invitations. Ferré died in 1971. Ferré wrote over 30 books in his lifetime.

== Selected works ==
- The Christian Faith (1942)
- Faith and Reason (1946)
- Strengthening the Spiritual Life (1951)
- The Christian Understanding of God (1952)
- The Sun and the Umbrella (1953)
- God’s New Age A Book Of Sermons (1956)
- Reason in Religion (1963)
- The Living God of Nowhere and Nothing (1967)
- The Universal Word: A Theology for a Universal Faith (1969)

== Honors, awards, and positions ==
- Appointed by Andover Newton Theological School in 1939 to Abbott Professorship of Systematic Theology
- Appointed by Vanderbilt University Divinity School in 1950 as Professor of Philosophical & Systematic Theology
- Returned to Abbott Professorship at Andover Newton Theological School in 1957
- Appointed by Parsons College, Fairfield, Iowa, in 1965 as Scholar in Residence
- Appointed by The College of Wooster, Wooster, Ohio, in 1968 as Professor of Philosophy
