= Kenneth Lee Carder =

American bishop

Kenneth Lee Carder (born November 18, 1940) is a retired American bishop of the United Methodist Church, elected in 1992. Carder distinguished himself as a pastor, a member of Annual Conference and General U.M. agencies, a bishop, seminary professor, and an author.

== Birth and family ==
Born in Washington County, Tennessee, Kenneth is one of five children of Allen and Edith Carder. Ken married Linda Miller June 30, 1961. She is a graduate of Emory and Henry College. They are the parents of two daughters, Sheri Carder Hood and Sandra Carder Nash, and they have five grandchildren.

== Education ==
Ken graduated with honors from East Tennessee State University in 1962, and from Wesley Theological Seminary in 1965. In 1980 he earned a Doctor of Ministry Degree from Vanderbilt Divinity School. He was awarded an honorary Doctor of Divinity Degree from Millsaps College in 2004.

== Ordained ministry ==
Ken was ordained deacon in 1963 by Bishop Roy H. Short. He was ordained elder in 1965 by Bishop H. Ellis Finger, Jr. Prior to his election to the episcopacy, Ken pastored churches in Gaithersburg, Maryland; Bristol, Tennessee; Abingdon, Virginia; and Oak Ridge, Tennesseeak Ridge and Knoxville, Tennessee. He chaired the Task Force on Genetic Science, which presented its report to the 1992 U.M. General Conference. In addition to dialogue between science and theology, Ken has special concern for prison ministries, racial justice, and ministry with the poor and marginalized.

Ken Carder was a delegate to the Southeastern Jurisdictional Conference of the U.M. Church in 1980. He was elected General Conference delegate, 1984–92. He has served in several Annual and General Conference positions, including Chair of the Conference Council on Finance and Administration, a Director of the General Board of Church and Society, and president of the General Board of Discipleship. He was also a trustee of Emory University, and Henry College, Martin Methodist College, Lambuth University, and Millsaps College, Rust College, and a member of the Board of Governors of Wesley Seminary. He also served as a Trustee of Methodist Le Bonheur Healthcare in Memphis, Tennessee, and Methodist Rehabilitation Hospital in Jackson, MS.

== Episcopal ministry ==
Bishop Carder was elected to the episcopacy in 1992 by the Southeastern Jurisdictional Conference of the U.M. Church. At the time he was the pastor of the Church Street U.M.C. in Knoxville. He was assigned to the Nashville Episcopal Area, effective September 1, 1992. He was assigned to the Mississippi Area in 2000, where he served until retiring in 2004. Among the offices he held in the Council of Bishops are the following: chairperson of the Teaching Concerns Committee, Secretary of the Task Force on the Episcopal Initiative on Children and Poverty, and the Council's Laison to United Methodist Seminaries. He authored the Foundation Document for the Initiative on Children and Poverty. He was also a member of the University Senate and chaired Commission on Theological Education. He was selected by the Council to deliver the Episcopal Address at the 2004 General Conference.

Academic Ministry

      Bishop Carder joined the faculty of Duke University Divinity School upon retiring from the active Episcopacy in 2004 where he was named as the Ruth W. and A. Morris Williams, Jr. Professor of the Practice of Christian Ministry. Among the courses taught were the following: Introduction of Ordained Ministry; the Local Church in Mission; Preaching in the Wesleyan Tradition; Prophetic Ministry: Shaping Communities of Justice; Evangelism and Leadership in the Wesleyan Tradition; and Prison Ministry, Restorative Justice, and the Church. Upon retiring from Duke, he taught part-time as Senior Visiting Professor of Wesley Studies at Lutheran Theological Southern Seminary, in Columbia, SC.
       Bishop Carder is the author of the following books:

Sermons on United Methodist Beliefs, Abingdon Press, 1991 Who Are We? Doctrine, Ministry and Mission of The United Methodist Church Leader's Guide, The United Methodist Publishing House, Revised edition 2001 Living Our Beliefs: The United Methodist Way, Discipleship Resources, Revised edition 2009. Grace to Lead: Practicing Leadership in the Wesleyan Tradition,(Co-authored with Lacey C. Warner), General Board of Higher Education and Ministry, Revised edition 2016 Ministry with the Forgotten: Dementia Through a Spiritual Lens, Abingdon Press, 2019

== See also ==
- List of bishops of the United Methodist Church
