= Joseph Haroutunian =

American theologian

Joseph Haroutunian (1904-1968) was an American Presbyterian theologian. He taught at McCormick Theological Seminary, and then at the University of Chicago, where he served as Cyrus H. McCormick Professor of Systematic Theology. He wrote widely on theological matters and on the role of the church in the world.

== Selected works ==
- Piety Versus Moralism: The Passing of the New England Theology (1932) on New England theology
- Wisdom and Folly in Religion: A Study in Chastened Protestantism (1940)
- Lust For Power (1949)
- Calvin: Commentaries (1958) editor with Louise Pettibone Smith
- God with Us: A Theology of Transpersonal Life (1965)
