= Amy Welborn =

American Catholic writer (born 1960)

- Born: July 17, 1960 (age 66); Bloomington, Indiana, U.S.
- Education: University of Tennessee (BA); Vanderbilt University Divinity School (MA)
- Occupation: Blogger
- Writing career
- Language: English
- Genre: Religion
- Subject: Catholicism
- Notable works: De-Coding Da Vinci, Here. Now. A Catholic Guide to the Good Life, Prove It

Amy Welborn (born July 17, 1960, in Bloomington, Indiana) is an American Catholic writer and activist, as well as a public speaker. Formerly, she was a theology teacher at a Catholic high school in Lakeland Florida and served as a parish Director of Religious Education. She was a columnist for Our Sunday Visitor. as well as for Catholic News Service.

== Blog ==
Welborn was one of the first Catholic bloggers. She has changed her blog's name and server on three occasions. The four successive blogs have been In Between Naps (amywelborn.blogspot.com), Open Book (amywelborn.typepad.com), Charlotte Was Both (amywelborn.wordpress.com), and Via Media (blog.beliefnet.com/ViaMedia). Open Book received almost 12,000 page views per day when it was still active.

Welborn considers blogging to be an alternative venue to expose unpopular views.

== Education ==
Welborn holds a BA in Honors History from the University of Tennessee and an MA in Church History from Vanderbilt Divinity School.

== Publications ==
- De-Coding Da Vinci, which examines the historical accuracy of Dan Brown's novel The Da Vinci Code.
- Here. Now. A Catholic Guide to the Good Life, targeted toward teens and young adults who have questions about Catholicism and faith in general.
- The Prove It apologetics series for young people, a five-book collection of questions and answers about God, the Church, Jesus, prayer and you.
- "A Catholic Woman's Book of Days"
- "The Loyola Kids' Book of Saints"
- "The Loyola Kids' Book of Heroes"
- "Friendship with Jesus: Pope Benedict XVI Talks to Children about their First Holy Communion"
- "Be Saints! An Invitation from Pope Benedict XVI"
- "Bambinelli Sunday: A Christmas Blessing"
