= McCormick Theological Seminary =

Presbyterian seminary located in Chicago

Coordinates: 41°47′46.8″N 87°35′56.2″W

- Type: Private seminary
- Established: 1829; 197 years ago
- Religious affiliation: Presbyterian Church (USA)
- Endowment: $80.0 million (FY23)
- President: Rev. Dr. Maisha Handy
- Faculty: 8
- Postgraduates: 215
- Location: Chicago, Illinois, United States
- Website: www.mccormick.edu

McCormick Theological Seminary is a private Presbyterian seminary in Chicago, Illinois.

As of 2023, it shares a campus with the Lutheran School of Theology at Chicago and Catholic Theological Union, in the Hyde Park neighborhood of Chicago. A letter of intent was signed on May 5, 2022, to sell the formerly shared campus with the Lutheran School of Theology at Chicago to the University of Chicago. The agreement allows the two seminaries to lease back facilities on the campus. Although it primarily serves the Presbytery of Chicago and the Synod of Lincoln Trails, McCormick Theological Seminary also educates members of other Christian denominations.

== History ==
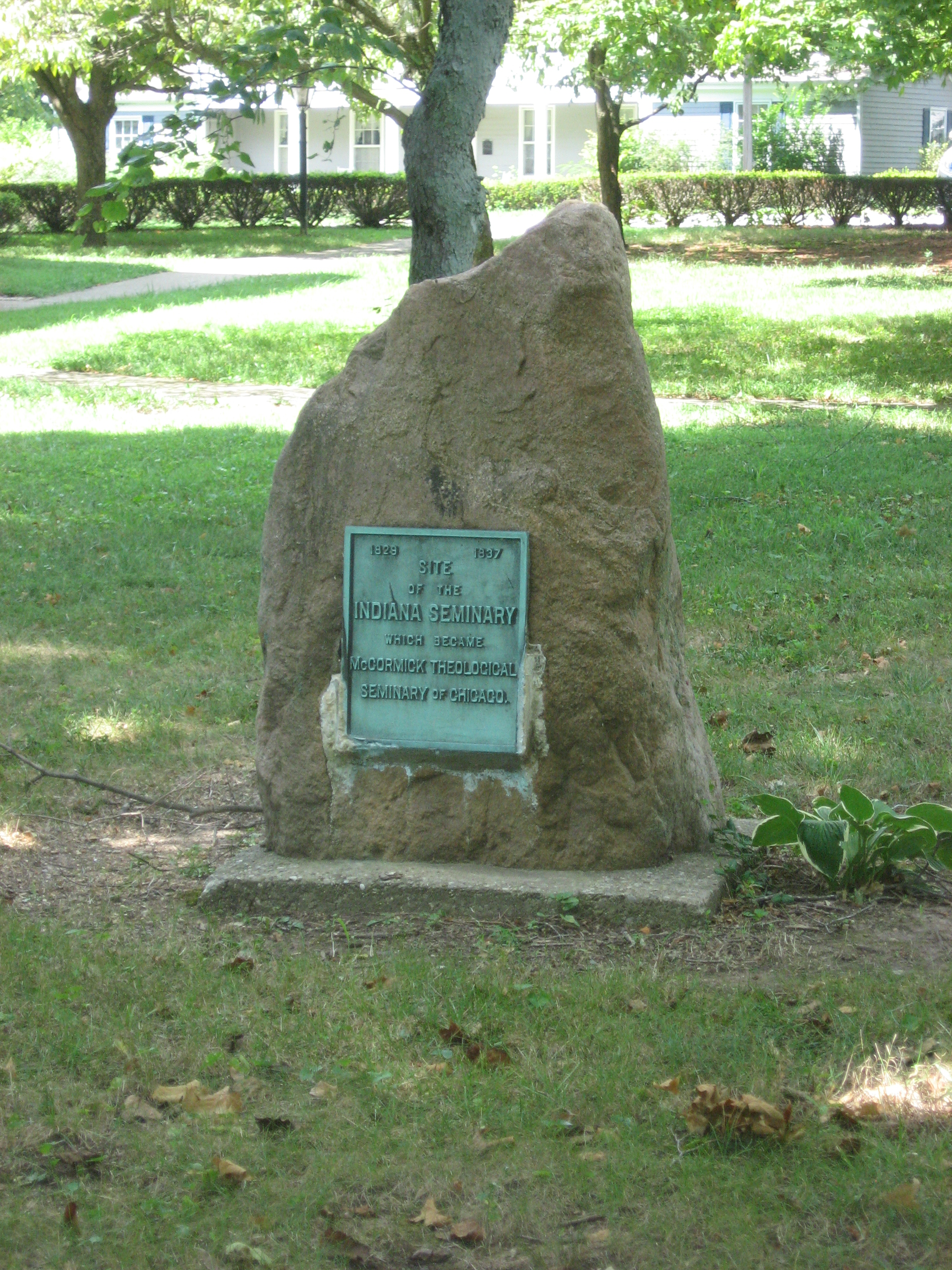
Monument to the seminary in Hanover, Indiana

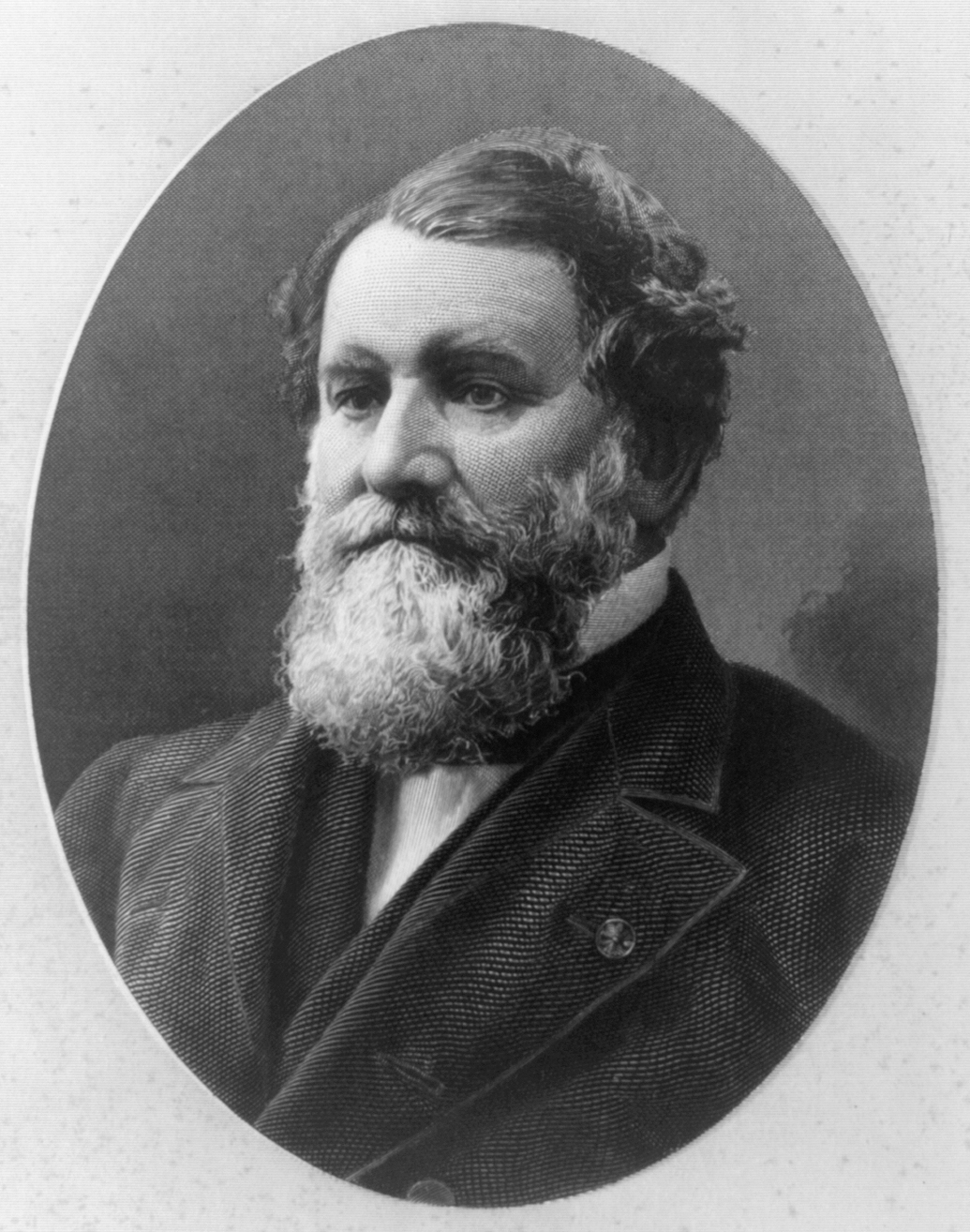
The school was named after Cyrus McCormick.

Hanover Seminary was established in 1829 as a preparatory school in Hanover, Indiana, for prospective ministers in the Presbyterian Church in the U.S.A., hoping to serve on the western frontier of the expanding United States. After about ten years, the seminary moved a short distance to New Albany, Indiana, where it became the New Albany Theological Seminary. When the western frontier boundary moved, the school also moved and opened in Chicago's present-day Lincoln Park neighborhood in 1859 where the school was first known as the Theological Seminary of the Northwest. In 1886, it was renamed in honor of American industrialist Cyrus McCormick (1809–1884), who had served as a member of the seminary's board of trustees.

In 1975, facing a dire financial situation and declining enrollment, McCormick sold the Lincoln Park campus to DePaul University and moved to the Hyde Park neighborhood in Chicago. This move divested the institution of infrastructure while reinforcing its commitment to urban ministry. Sharing facilities with the Lutheran School of Theology at Chicago (LSTC), McCormick began to help foster important ecumenical cooperation between the Presbyterian and Lutheran churches. In 2003 McCormick reinforced and recommitted itself to its ecumenical partnership with LSTC by building a new building on the LSTC campus.

== Notable faculty ==
- Cleland Boyd McAfee taught theology (1912–1930)
- Joseph Haroutunian
- Kenneth E. Bailey
- Enos Pomeroy Baker (1856–1911), 1886 graduate and former president, Presbyterian College of the Southwest at Del Norte, CO. Baker was also the founding minister of Westminster Presbyterian Church, Los Angeles, the oldest African American Presbyterian church in California and west of the Mississippi River.
- James Gore King McClure Jr. first (President of McCormick Theological Seminary 1905–1929)
- Rev. Dr. Andrew Constantinides Zenos (Dean of McCormick Theological Seminary 1920–1934)
- Ovid R. Sellers (Dean of McCormick Theological Seminary 1934–1954)

== Notable alumni ==
- David Frank Graf
- Bobby Rush
- Steven A. Schaick
- Frederick Wedge

== See also ==
- McCormick family
