= Christoph Schmauch =

American theologian (born 1935)

Christoph Schmauch (né Werner Christoph) Schmauch (born February 1, 1935, in Wrocław) is a retired Lutheran pastor, who also served as the director of the World Fellowship Center in Albany, New Hampshire, for 32 years.

Schmauch is the son of Werner Schmauch, who helped to found the Christian Peace Conference. After graduating from high school in 1955, he studied Protestant theology at three separate universities, before becoming ordained as a pastor by the United Lutheran Church in 1958. In the early 1960s, he married Kathryn 'Kit' Hively (born 1933), a school teacher from Columbus, Ohio, and they subsequently had four children, three sons and one daughter. In 1968, he earned a Master of Sacred Theology from Union Theological Seminary while working for the Methodist Church intern for the United Nations.

In 1970, he and Kit became co-directors of the World Fellowship Center, a conference and retreat center located in Albany, New Hampshire founded by and for peace and social justice activists in 1941. They retained this position for 32 years, retiring after the 2000 season. Afterwards, the Schmauch couple lived in nearby Conway, New Hampshire, but as of 2019, they reside in Kit's native Ohio.
