= Andrew Constantinides Zenos =

American Presbyterian minister (1855–1942)

The Reverend Andrew Constantinides Zenos
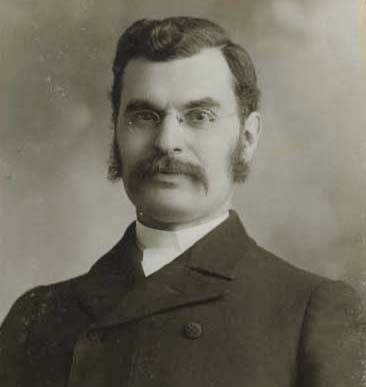

Dean of McCormick Theological Seminary
- In office 1920–1934
- Preceded by: Established
- Succeeded by: Ovid R. Sellers

Personal details
- Born: August 13, 1855 Constantinople, Turkey
- Died: January 25, 1942 (aged 86) Chicago, Illinois, U.S.
- Resting place: Graceland Cemetery
- Spouse: Ruth Schlager
- Children: 4 daughters, 1 son
- Education: University of Athens (BA); McCormick Theological Seminary MDiv, DD; Lake Forest College PhD
- Alma mater: Robert College
- Occupation: Minister
- Profession: Author, professor, lecturer, minister, dean
- Known for: Demonology, Satan, Biblical Studies

Andrew Constantinides Zenos (Greek: Ανδρέας Κωνσταντινίδης Ξένος; August 13, 1855 – January 25, 1942) was a Presbyterian minister, author, translator, professor, and lecturer. He spoke eleven languages including Greek, Latin, and Hebrew. He wrote a large number of books about theology. He spent most of his career at McCormick Theological Seminary in Chicago. He was dean of the institution from 1920 to 1934. He is one of three notable Greek-American ministers in the United States during the 19th century. The other two were abolitionists John Celivergos Zachos and Photius Fisk. He frequently lectured across the United States.

Andrew Constantinides Zenos was born in Constantinople. He was an orphan at an early age. His father was a silk merchant. He entered Robert College around age thirteen. He graduated four years later and briefly went to Athens. He attended the University of Athens where he studied Greek and oriental literature. He migrated to the United States in 1876. He was accepted at Princeton Theological Seminary in 1877. He was ordained four years later. By 1888 he received his LL. D. by the same institution. In 1891 he traveled to Chicago where he would spend the rest of his life. That same year, he became a professor at the McCormick Theological Seminary. He eventually became dean of the institution from 1920 to 1934. He was affiliated with the seminary for over fifty-one years. He lived at 834 West Chalmers Place in Chicago.

== Biography ==
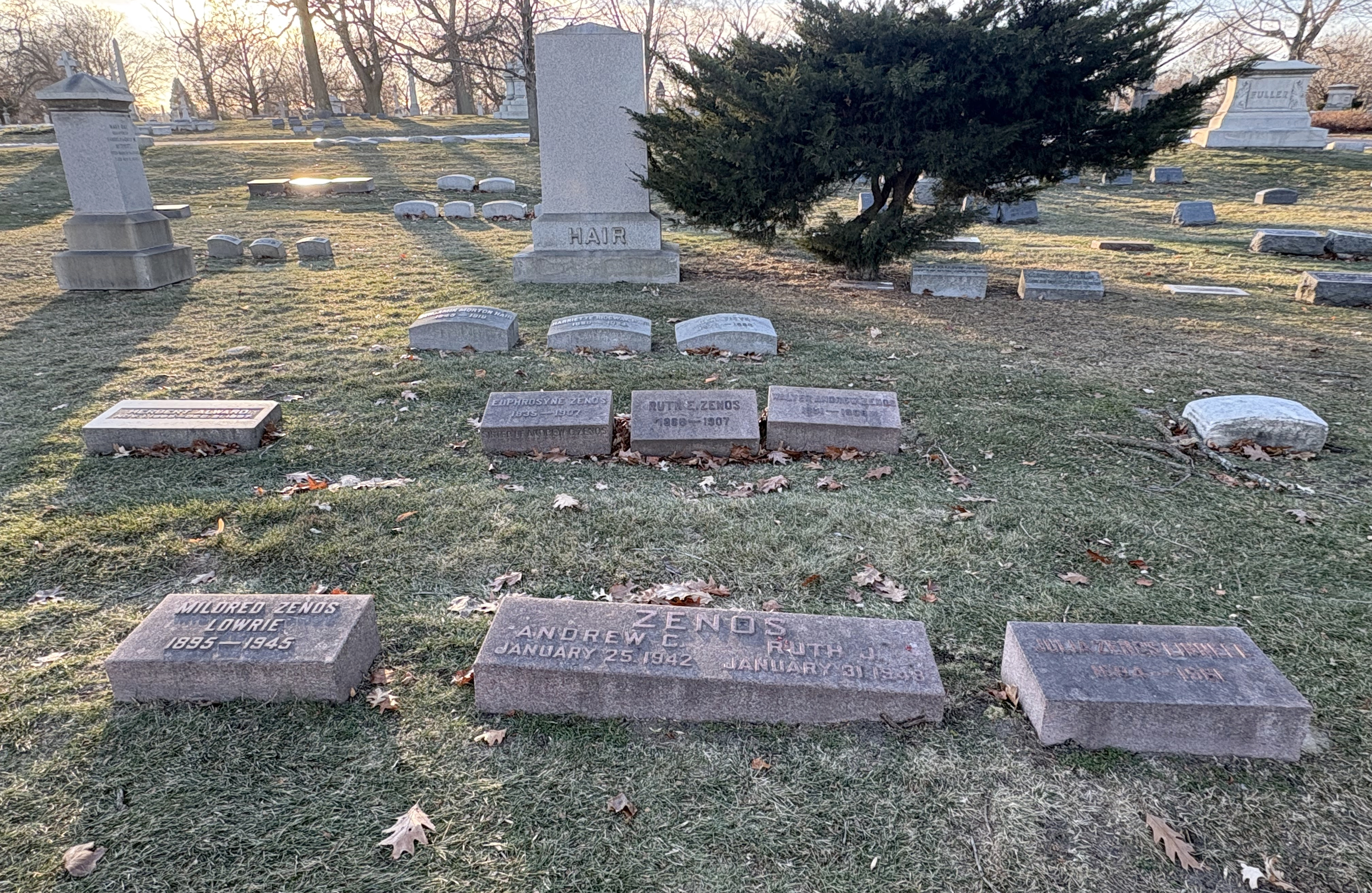
Zenos's grave (front center) at Graceland Cemetery

Zenos was born in Constantinople on August 13, 1855. He was a Greek orphan, he took the last name Zenos pronounced ksenos. Zenos means "stranger" in Greek. His father was a silk merchant. Zenos initially attended Robert College in Constantinople from 1868 to 1872. He briefly traveled to Athens. He attended the University of Athens. There he studied Greek and Literature. He came to the United States in 1876. He enrolled in the Princeton Theological Seminary in 1877. He finished his M.A. in 1880. Around the same period famous Greek American Gregory Anthony Perdicaris lived in the same area. He was the president of the Princeton Gaslight Company. Two other prominent Greek American ministers alive around the same period were John Celivergos Zachos and Photius Fisk. Zenos married Ruth Schlager they had three daughters.

Zenos was ordained a minister of the Presbyterian church on September 29, 1881, and was a pastor in Brandt, Pennsylvania from 1881 to 1883. He joined the faculty of Lake Forest University in Lake Forest, Illinois in 1883. He was professor of Greek at Lake Forest University until 1888. He was rewarded his LL. D. in 1888 from the Princeton Theological Seminary. Zenos migrated to Hartford, Connecticut. He lived there from 1888 to 1891. He was professor of New Testament Exegesis at Hartford Theological Seminary. Around this period he contributed to the book called The Ecclesiastical History of Socrates. In 1891, he moved to Chicago where he lived out the remainder of his life. He became a professor at the McCormick Theological Seminary. He spoke eleven languages. He remained at the seminary until his death. He was professor of Biblical and Ecclesiastical History and Biblical Theology. He extensively studied demonology and the devil. His interpretation of Satan was published in A Standard Bible Dictionary.

Zenos published numerous articles and books on theology. He was a contributing editor to the theological dictionaries and encyclopedias. He also lectured across the United States on theological matters. He was a member of the Presbyterian church for over sixty-one years. From 1920, he served as Dean at McCormick Theological Seminary for fourteen years retiring in 1934. He was seventy-eight years old. He served alongside the first president of McCormick Theological Seminary, James Gore King McClure Jr. After his retirement Zenos remained dean emeritus. He was active at McCormick Theological Seminary until his death. In 1936, he received an honorary degree of doctorate in literature from Lake Forest College. Zenos died of pneumonia at 86 years old in Chicago, and was buried at Graceland Cemetery. He left a sizable fortune to his family.

== Literary works ==
- The Presbyterian Congress (1893)
- The Elements of the Higher Criticism (1895)
- Compendium of Church History (1896)
- The Presbyterian Churches in the United States of America (1897)
- The Accredited Principles of the Higher Criticism (1898)
- The Teaching of Jesus Concerning Christian Conduct (1905)
- The Son of Man: Studies in the Gospel of Mark (1914)

=== Associate editor ===
- The Ecclesiastical History of Socrates (1891)
- The Popular and Critical Bible Encyclopædia and Scriptural Dictionary (1902)
- A Standard Bible Dictionary (1909)

== Bibliography ==
- Loetscher, Lefferts Augustine (1957). The Broadening Church: A Study of Theological Issues in the Presbyterian Church Since 1869. Philadelphia, Pennsylvania: University of Pennsylvania Press. pp. 78–79.
