= Willard Uphaus =

Willard Uphaus (November 27, 1890 – October 5, 1983) was an American theologian and pacifist.

Uphaus was born on a farm in rural Delaware County, Indiana, and attended nearby Earlham College, a liberal arts college founded by the Religious Society of Friends (Quakers), in Richmond, Indiana, graduating in 1913. Uphaus went on to earn his PhD in the psychology of religion at Yale University, and subsequently taught at Vanderbilt University Divinity School in Nashville, Tennessee, and Hastings College in Hastings, Nebraska. In 1930, Uphaus was dismissed from Hastings for theological interpretations and his leftist viewpoints. Subsequently, six department heads resigned from Hastings in protest.

Between 1934 and 1953, Uphaus ran an organization called the National Religion and Labor Foundation, which supported labor unions and advocated civil rights and racial equality He remained committed to pacifist causes during World War II, and in 1950 served as a delegate to the World Peace Conference in Warsaw.

In 1953, Uphaus and his wife Ola became the directors of the World Fellowship Center, a summer conference and retreat center in Albany, New Hampshire. It was there in 1954, amidst the height of McCarthyism, that he was pressured by New Hampshire Attorney General Louis Wyman to surrender a list of all attendees of World Fellowship Center. Uphaus voluntarily met with Wyman several times in 1954 in a futile attempt to clarify that he had never officially been a member of any explicitly Communist party, but the attorney remained firm in his demand that Uphaus produce a list that included the addresses and contact information of all attendees, speakers, and employees at World Fellowship. To this Uphaus steadfastly refused; in January 1956, was subpoenaed to produce such list or face time in jail. The case reflected a major first amendment challenge to McCarthyism and was the subject of a supreme court decision. After several appeals, Uphaus was sentenced to a year in jail on December 14, 1959, for contempt of court.

In 1961, Uphaus resumed his directorship position at World Fellowship, authored an autobiography entitled Commitment in 1963 and retired in 1969. During the 1970s he divided his time between New Haven, Connecticut, and St. Petersburg, Florida. He died at age 92 on October 5, 1983, in New Haven.

Uphaus was a sponsor of the Fair Play for Cuba Committee.
