= David G. Buttrick =

American Presbyterian minister

David G. Buttrick (1927–2017) was an American Presbyterian minister who later joined the United Church of Christ and became the Drucilla Moore Buffington Professor of homiletics and liturgics at the Vanderbilt University Divinity School.

Buttrick was born in New York City in 1927. He was the youngest son of the Rev. George Arthur Buttrick (1892–1980), who also taught at Vanderbilt University, and his wife Agnes Gardner. He married Betty More Allaban in 1950 and they had a daughter. He died, aged 89, on April 22, 2017, in Nashville.

Buttrick was a prolific scholar, writing or editing more than a dozen books and numerous book chapters. He also published more than 175 articles and reviews. He published the book Homiletic (Fortress, 1987).

== Bibliography ==
- Homiletic: Moves and Structures. Fortress Press (1987).
- Speaking Jesus: Homiletic Theology and the Sermon on the Mount. John Knox Press (2002).
- Speaking Conflict: Stories of a Controversial Jesus John Knox Press (2007).
