= Sharon D. Welch =

American academic

- Born: Dimmitt, Texas, U.S.

Academic background
- Education: Michigan State University; Graceland University (BA); Vanderbilt University (PhD)

Sharon D. Welch (born November 11, 1952) is an academic scholar, social ethicist and author of six books on ethics, theology, politics, religion and spirituality. After having served as Provost and Professor of Religion for ten years, she is currently Affiliate Faculty member at Meadville Lombard Theological School.

== Early life ==
Welch was born in West Texas. Her mother and father were both Social Gospel ministers.

== Family ==
Welch has two daughters, Zoe and Hannah.

== Ethical Concepts ==
Writing as a social ethicist and academic, Welch is known for developing a "Feminist Ethic of Risk," explained in a book by the same name, published in 1990 and reprinted in 2000. Welch notes that the results of action cannot be guaranteed because all action is bounded by power. She suggests that an Ethic of Risk sets up a matrix of possibilities and resistance on a horizon of change. An Ethics of Risk has three elements: a redefinition of responsible action that is not built on outcomes alone, risk grounded in community, and strategic risk-taking.

== Career ==
Welch is currently a member of the Unitarian Universalist Peace Ministry Network and the Cook County League of Women Voters, a Fellow of the Institute for Humanist Studies, and serves on the Board of Renewal in the Wilderness.

Prior to joining the faculty at Meadville Lombard Theological School, Welch held positions as Professor and Chair of Religious Studies, Professor of Women's and Gender Studies and adjunct professor of Educational Leadership and Policy Analysis at the University of Missouri (1991–2007); she was also Assistant and then associate professor of Theology and Religion and Society at Harvard Divinity School (1982–1991).

Welch received the Distinguished Alumna award for 2019 from Vanderbilt Divinity School.

== Books ==
- Communities of Resistance and Solidarity: A Feminist Theology of Liberation (1985, Orbis Books; 2017, Wipf and Stock; ISBN 9781532616969)
- A Feminist Ethic of Risk (1990, 2000 Revised Second Edition, Fortress Press; ISBN 9780800631857)
- Sweet Dreams in America: Making Ethics and Spirituality Work (1999, Routledge; ISBN 9780415916578)
- After Empire: The Art and Ethos of Enduring Peace (2004, Fortress Press; ISBN 9780800629861)
- Real Peace, Real Security: The Challenges of Global Citizenship (2008, Fortress Press; ISBN 9780800662790)
- After the Protests Are Heard: Enacting Civic Engagement and Social Transformation (2018, NYU Press; ISBN 9781479857906)
