= David Frank Graf =

American historian and archeologist (born 1939)

David F. Graf
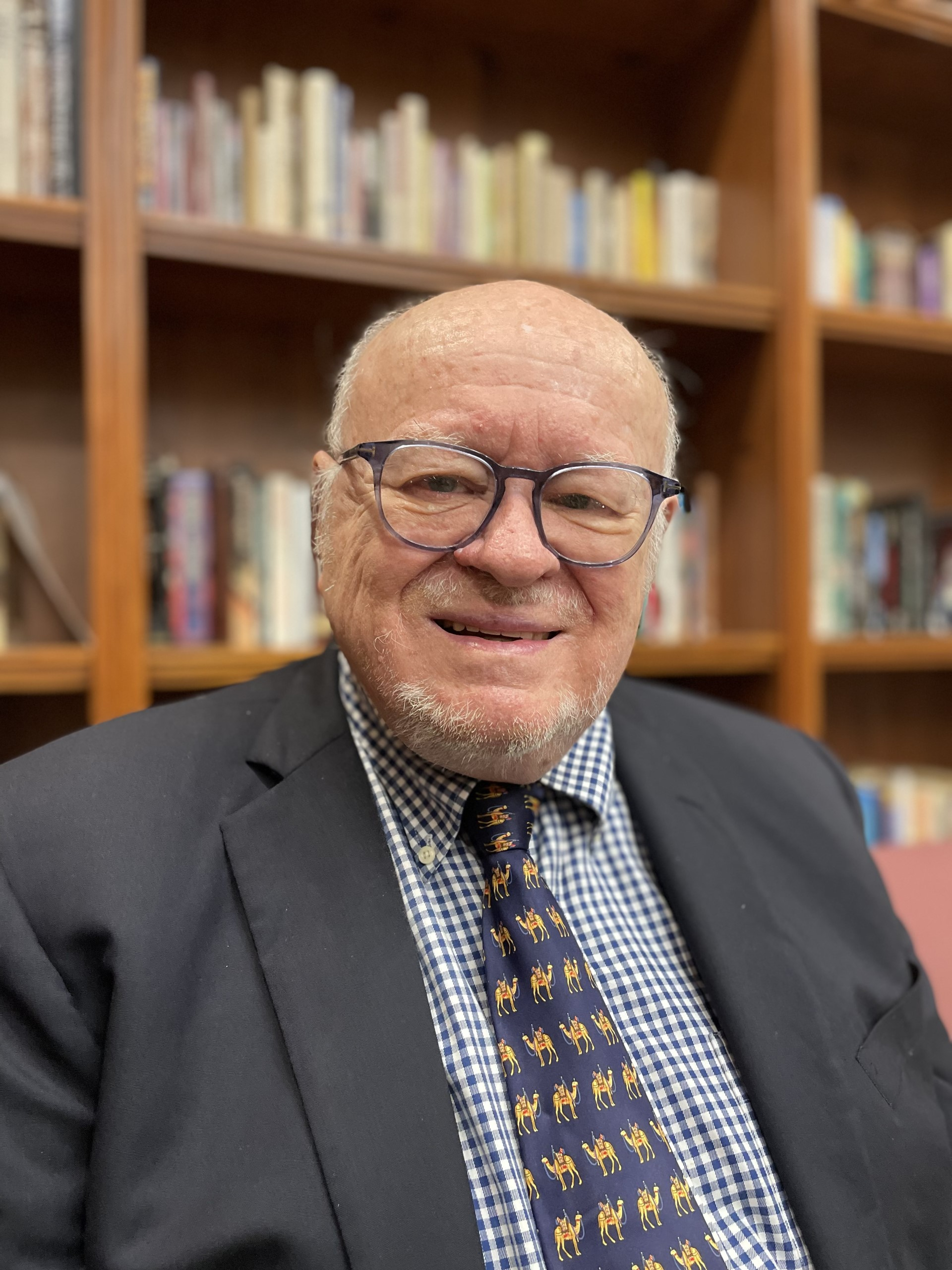
- Born: December 3, 1939 (age 86)
- Occupations: Historian, archaeologist, academic and author

Academic background
- Education: Harding College (B.A.); McCormick Theological Seminary (B.D.); The University of Michigan (M.A., PhD)

Academic work
- Institutions: University of Miami

David F. Graf (born 3 December 1939) is an American historian, archeologist, academic, and author. He is a professor emeritus at the University of Miami.

Graf is most known for his work on the Greco-Roman Near East. Contact_us. studies on Greek–Persian relations stem from his PhD dissertation in 1979 ("Medism: Greek Collaboration with Achaemenid Persia"). He later authored the book Rome and the Arabian Frontier: From the Nabataeans to the Saracens.

== Education ==
Graf graduated from Harding College in 1965 with a BA degree and then pursued a BD with honors in Hebrew Bible from McCormick Theological Seminary. Later, he earned an MA degree from the University of Michigan, followed by a PhD from the same institution.

== Career ==
Graf began his academic career as a visiting lecturer in the Department of Near Eastern Studies at the University of Michigan from 1982 to 1983 and served at Montana State University as an adjunct Assistant Professor in the Department of History in 1984. In 1986, he joined the University of Miami's Department of History, where he held various positions, including assistant professor until 1990, Associate Professor from 1990 to 1995, and professor from 1995 to 2003. Between 2004 and 2022, he served as a professor in the Department of Religious Studies at the University of Miami. As of 2022, he is the Professor Emeritus at the University of Miami.

Graf served as the director of the Roman Road Project from 1986 to 1995, the Eastern Desert Epigraphical Survey from 1996 to 2000, the Hellenistic Petra Project from 2004 to 2007, the Joint Saudi-American Jurash Project from 2008 to 2009, and the Ba'aja Excavations in 2017.

== Research ==
Graf received the 2003 William Fulbright Scholar Award and the Seymour Gitin Distinguished Fellowship at the Albright Institute of Archaeological Research in Jerusalem. He has authored numerous publications spanning the areas of Greek-Persian relations, Semitic epigraphy, and Roman Arabia, including books and articles in peer-reviewed journals.

=== Greek-Persian relations and Semitic epigraphy ===
Throughout his research career, Graf has dedicated focus to the examination of Greek-Persian relations. In his early research he analyzed the historical context and significance of the terms "Medism" for the Greek collaborators ("quisilings") with Achaemenid Persia during the early fifth century BCE. In 1995, he provided an analysis of the Persian Royal Road System, beyond the Sardis-Susa segment recorded by Herodotus, using Persian travel documents, documentary sources, and archeology to describe the intricate network that stretched across the vast empire. His investigation into Aramaic's use as the lingua franca in the outlying regions of the Achaemenid Empire highlighted indigenous factors in administration. His work The Satrapy of Arabia has received particular emphasis over the years.

Graf's studies in Semitic epigraphy have contributed to the study of ancient Semitic-speaking civilizations, their languages, cultures, and interactions. Through his epigraphic surveys in Jordan, he published unrecorded inscriptions in South Arabian, Nabataean Aramaic, and Ancient North Arabian languages. The discovery of lengthy Ancient North Arabian texts in pre-Islamic Arabic in Central Jordan prompted a survey of the neighboring region, leading to the discovery of around 140 previously unrecorded texts, most of which are in the so-called "Hismaic" script. His most recent work in 2017 presented an account of the identification of a substantial basaltic stone situated in the region of Ma'ayan Barukh, located in Upper Galilee, inscribed with North Arabian graffiti and a fragmentary Aramaic text, that gained attention for its non-Arabian provenance.

=== Rome's Eastern frontier and Nabatea ===
Graf's research examined the historical, archaeological, and epigraphical aspects of the Nabataean Arab realm centered around Petra, encompassing the examination of the kingdom's legal and religious customs, as well as its interactions with the Roman Empire. Focusing on the earlier history of the Nabataeans, he presented substantive evidence supporting the existence of the Nabataean dynasty as early as the third century and revealed that the account provided by "Athenoduros of Tarsus" regarding the Nabataeans must date a generation earlier than what had been previously assumed. In collaboration with G. Schmid, he directed excavations in the Civic Center at Petra, which resulted in the unearthing of Greek pottery and the earliest Nabataean coins, indicating a prolonged period of established habitation, contrary to the previous understanding, and that is supported by the later French excavations conducted in the neighboring site of Qasr al-Bint. Moreover, he investigated the geographical extent of the Nabateans from north of Petra to Damascus, spanning across various regions such as the Judaean Peraea in Transjordan, the Decapolis, and Southern Syria. Additionally, his research also studied the Arab presence in Egypt, Palestine, the Aegean. and Italy.

=== New Greek and Latin inscriptions ===
Graf has also published some New Greek and Latin inscriptions. This includes some new Latin milestone texts from the Via Nova Traiana and, more recently, the compilation of a complete epigraphic corpus of Greek and Latin inscriptions translated into English from Agrippa II's reign, together with some newly discovered Safaitic inscriptions from southern Syria that mention the ruler. In subsequent research, he examined a distinctive new Greek funerary text originating from the northern region of Jordan, which revolved around the return of the mortal remains of a Roman dignitary during the early fourth century, hailing from Anatolia.

Graf also made contributions to the study of the Syrian oasis of Palmyra, encompassing analysis of its governmental establishments during the period of Roman dominion and its economic engagements, as well as its uprising against the Roman Empire led by Queen Zenobia. Furthermore, his investigation into the ancient trade route connecting China and Syria, known as the "Silk Road," has provided a review of historical records from the Han Dynasty, as well as Bactrian documents and Palmyrene inscriptions, substantiating the occurrence of extensive overland trade and exchanges across vast distances.

== Awards and honors ==
- 1979–1980 – NEH Fellow, American Center of Oriental Research in Amman
- 2003 – William Fulbright Scholar Award for Saudi Arabia
- 2008 – Member, The Institute for Advanced Study
- 2017 – Seymour Gitin Distinguished Fellowship, Albright Archaeological Institute of Research

== Bibliography ==
=== Books ===
- Rome and the Arabian Frontier: From the Nabataeans to the Saracens (2019) ISBN 9781138353244
- The Anchor Bible Dictionary, 6 vols. New Haven: Yale University of New York: Doubleday (1992) ISBN 9780300140019

=== Selected articles ===
- Graf, D. F. (1978). The Saracens and the defense of the Arabian frontier. Bulletin of the American Schools of Oriental Research, 229(1), 1–26.
- Graf, D. F. (1984). Medism: the Origin and Significance of the Term. The Journal of Hellenic Studies, 104, 15–30.
- Graf, D. F. (1995). The Via Nova Traiana in Arabia Petraea. The Roman and Byzantine Near East, Archaeological Research, 41–67.
- Graf, D. F., & Zwettler, M. J. (2004). The North Arabian" Thamudic E" Inscription from Uraynibah West. Bulletin of the American Schools of Oriental Research, 335(1), 53–89.
- Graf, D. F. (2006). The Nabataeans in the Early Hellenistic Period: The Testimony of Posidippus of Petra. Topoi: Orient-Occident 14, 47–68. Graf, D. F. (2018). The Silk Road between Syria and China. Trade, commerce, and the state in the Roman world, 443–532.
- Graf, D. F. (2021). The Nabataeans. A Companion to the Hellenistic and Roman Near East, 272–283.
- Graf, D. F. (2022), The "Client Kings" of Judaea and Nabataea in the First Century BCE, Strata: Bulletin of the Anglo-Israel Archaeological Society 40, 39–100.
