= Sallie McFague =

American feminist theologian (1933–2019)

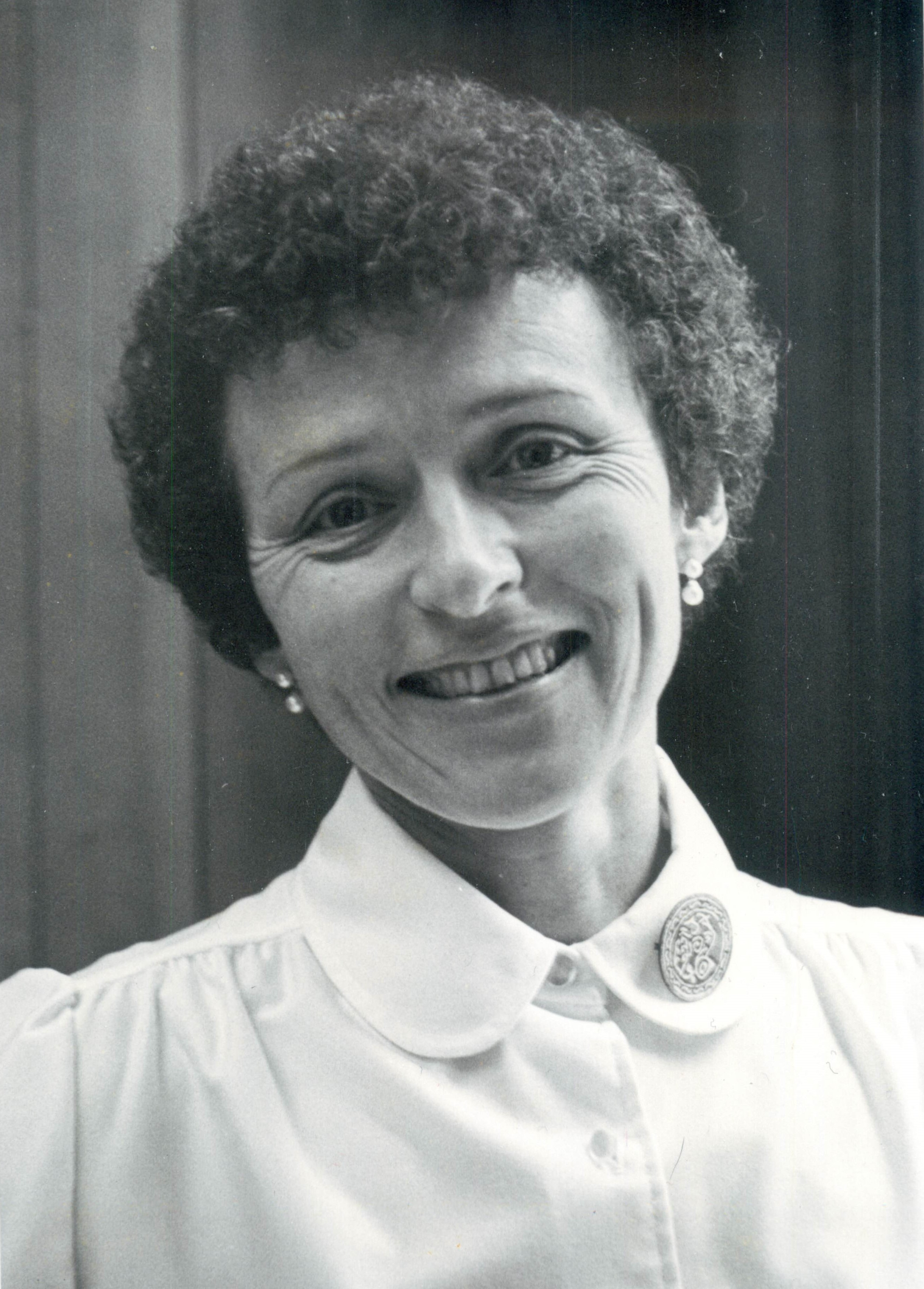
- McFague
- Born: May 25, 1933; Quincy, Massachusetts, US
- Died: November 15, 2019 (aged 86); Vancouver, British Columbia, Canada
- Other name: Sallie McFague TeSelle
- Spouses: Eugene TeSelle (m. 1959; div. 1976); Janet Cawley

Academic background
- Education: Smith College; Yale University
- Academic advisor: H. Richard Niebuhr
- Influences: Karl Barth; Gordon Kaufman

Academic work
- Discipline: Theology
- School or tradition: Christian feminism; postmodernism
- Institutions: Vanderbilt University; Vancouver School of Theology

Sallie McFague (May 25, 1933 – November 15, 2019) was an American feminist Christian theologian, best known for her analysis of how metaphor lies at the heart of how Christians may speak about God. She applied this approach, in particular, to ecological issues, writing extensively on care for the Earth as if it were God's "body". She was Distinguished Theologian in Residence at the Vancouver School of Theology, British Columbia, Canada.

== Early life and career ==
McFague was born May 25, 1933, in Quincy, Massachusetts. Her father, Maurice Graeme McFague, was an optometrist. Her mother, Jessie Reid McFague, was a homemaker. She had one sister, Maurine (born 1929). McFague earned a Bachelor of Arts degree in English Literature in 1955 from Smith College and a Bachelor of Divinity degree from Yale Divinity School in 1959. She then went on to earn a Master of Arts degree at Yale University in 1960 and was awarded her PhD in 1964 – a revised version of her doctoral thesis being published in 1966 as Literature and the Christian Life. She received the LittD from Smith College in 1977.

At Yale she was deeply influenced by the dialectical theology of Karl Barth, but gained an important new perspective from her teacher H. Richard Niebuhr with his Appreciation of liberalism's concern for experience, relativity, the symbolic imagination and the role of the affections. She was deeply influenced by Gordon Kaufman.

McFague was Distinguished Theologian in Residence at the Vancouver School of Theology, British Columbia, Canada. She was also Theologian in Residence at Dunbar Ryerson United Church in Vancouver, British Columbia. For thirty years, she taught at the Vanderbilt University Divinity School in Nashville, Tennessee, where she was the Carpenter Professor of Theology. She was a member of the Anglican Church of Canada.

McFague married Eugene TeSelle in 1959. They had two children: Elizabeth (born 1962) and John (born 1964). They were divorced in 1976. McFague later married Janet Cawley, and they were together until McFague's death.

She died in Vancouver on November 15, 2019.

== Language of theology ==
For McFague, the language of Christian theology is necessarily a construction a human creation, a tool to delineate as best we can the nature and limits of our understanding of God. According to McFague, what we know of God is a construction, and must be understood as interpretation: God as father, as shepherd, as friend, but not literally any of these. Though such habits of language can be useful (since in the Western world at least people are more used to thinking of God in personal, than in abstract terms), they become constricting, when there is an insistence that God is always and only (or predominantly) like this.

=== Metaphor as a way of speaking about God ===
McFague remarked, "theology is mostly fiction", but a multiplicity of images, or metaphors, can and should enhance and enrich our models of God. Most importantly, new metaphors can help give substance to new ways of conceiving God appropriately "for our time", and more adequate models for the ethically urgent tasks humankind faces, principally the task of caring for an ecologically fragile planet.

McFague remarked that: "we construct the worlds we inhabit, but also that we forget we have done so". In this light, her work is understood as about "helping to unmask simplistic, absolutist, notions of objectivity" in relation to the claims language makes about God. And such images are usually not neutral: in McFague's understanding (and that of many feminist theologians), images of God are usually embedded within a particular socio-cultural and political system, such as the patriarchal one feminist theology critiques extensively - she asserted that "there are personal, relational models which have been suppressed in the Christian tradition because of their social and political consequences". But the 'trick' of a successful metaphor, whether in science or theology, is that it is capable of generating a model, which in turn can give life to an overarching concept or world-view, which looks like a coherent explanation of everything – looks like "reality" or "truth". In McFague's view, this is how the complex of "male" images for God has long functioned in the Christian West – but it has done so in a way that is oppressive for all but (privileged) men. So, the notion of God, as "father", "lord" or "king" now seemingly unavoidably conjures up oppressive associations of "ownership", obedience and dependency, and in turn dictates, consciously or otherwise, a whole complex of attitudes, responses and behaviours on the part of theistic believers.

== McFague's sources of new metaphors and models ==
This understanding of the shifting nature of language in relation to God underpins McFague's handling of the 'building blocks' that have long been considered foundational to accounts of belief, primarily Scripture and tradition. But neither is privileged as a source of conversation about God for McFague - both 'fall under experience', and are, in their different ways, themselves extended metaphors of interpretation or 'sedimentations' of a linguistic community's interpreted experience'. The experience of Jesus - his parables, table fellowship and healing ministry in particular - makes him a rich source of the 'destabilising, inclusive and non-hierarchical' metaphors Christians might profitably borrow from him as paradigmatic, a 'foundational figure'. But he is not all they need. Experience of the world, and of God's relationship to it, must add to that illustration and re-interpret it in terms and metaphors relevant to those believers, changing how they conceive of God and thus care for the earth. As McFague remarked: 'we take what we need from Jesus using clues and hints...for an interpretation of salvation in our time'.

=== God as mother ===
Though McFague does use biblical motifs, her development of them goes far beyond what they are traditionally held to convey. She used others, such as the notion of the world as God's body, an image used by the early church but which 'fell by the wayside' (according to British theologian Daphne Hampson), in her search for models 'appropriate' to our needs. She stressed that all models are partial, and are thought-experiments with shortcomings: many are needed, and need to function together. Her work on God as mother, for example, stressed that God is beyond male and female, recognizing twin dangers: exaggeration of the maternal qualities of the mother so as to unhelpfully essentialize God (and by transference, women as well) as caring and self-sacrificing; or juxtaposition of this image to that of father, unhelpfully emphasizing the gender-based nature of both male and female images for God. Nonetheless, she saw in it other connotations, which she maintained are helpful in re-imaging God in terms of the mother metaphor.

In particular, God as mother is associated with the beginning of life, its nurture, and its fulfilment. These associations allowed McFague to explore how creation of the cosmos as something 'bodied forth' from God preserves a much more intimate connection between creator and created than the traditional model whereby the world is created ex nihilo and sustained by a God distanced and separate from the creation. However, this same 'mother' who 'bodies forth' the cosmos cares for it with a fierce justice, which demands that all life (not just humankind) has its share of the creator's care and sustenance in a just, ecological economy where all her creatures flourish. For McFague, God is the one 'who judges those who thwart the well-being and fulfilment of her body, our world'.

=== Care for creation – the world as God's body ===
From this metaphor developed another: the metaphor of the world (or cosmos) as God's body. McFague elaborated this metaphor at length in The Body of God: An Ecological Theology. The purpose of using it is to 'cause us to see differently', to 'think and act as if bodies matter', and to 'change what we value'. If we imagine the cosmos as God's body, then 'we never meet God unembodied'. This is to take God in that cosmos seriously, for 'creation is God's self-expression'. Equally we must take seriously our own embodiment (and that of other bodies): all that is has a common beginning and history (as McFague put it 'we are all made of the ashes of dead stars'), and so salvation is about salvation of all earthly bodies (not just human ones) and first and foremost about living better on the earth, not in the hereafter. Elaborating further, McFague argued that sin, on this view, is a matter of offence against other parts of the 'body' (other species or parts of the creation) and in that sense only against God, while eschatology is about a better bodily future ('creation is the place of salvation, salvation is the direction of creation'), rather than a more disembodied spiritual one. In this metaphor, God is not a distant being but being-itself, a characterization that has led some to suggest McFague's theology was a form of monism. She defended her views as not monist but panentheist. The world seen as God's body chimes strongly with a feminist and panentheist stress on God as the source of all relationship, while McFague's understanding of sin (as essentially a failure of relationality, of letting other parts of the created order flourish free of our control) is also typically panentheist.

== Analysis – the nature and activity of God in McFague's thought ==
McFague's panentheistic theology stressed God as highly involved in the world (though distinct from it), and concerned (as seen in the life of the paradigmatic Jesus, for example) to see all of it brought to full enjoyment of the richness of life as originally intended in creation. This is not the omnipotent, omniscient and immutable God of classical theism and neo-orthodoxy: for McFague, God is not transcendent in any sense that we can know. This has led some critics to ask whether McFague's theology leaves us with anything that may properly be called God at all. British theologian Daphne Hampson notes 'the more I ponder this book [Models of God: Theology for an Ecological, Nuclear Age], the less clear I am that it is theistic'.

A theology where God as creator does not stand 'over against' the creation tends to shift the focus away from God as personal. In which Jesus is a paradigm individual rather than the unique bearer of godlikeness. The role of the Spirit is emphasized in her theology, though there is little sense in which this is uniquely the spirit of Jesus. God as Spirit is not primarily the initiator of creation, but 'the empowering, continuing breath of life'.

It follows, too, from this metaphor of God as involved in the world that traditional notions of sin and evil are discarded. God is so much part of the process of the world and its agencies' or entities' "becoming" that it is difficult to speak of "natural disasters" as sin: they are simply the chance (as viewed by human observers) trial-and-error ways in which the world develops. As McFague saw it, "within this enlarged perspective, we can no longer consider evil only in terms of what benefits or hurts me or my species. In a world as large, as complex, and with as many individuals and species as our planet has, the good of some will inevitably occur at the expense of others". And because the world is God's body, evil occurs in and to God as well as to us and the rest of creation.

Correspondingly, the notion of the individual in need of God's salvation is anachronistic in a world 'from' which that individual no longer need to be saved, but rather 'in' which he or she need to learn how to live interrelatedly and interdependently. Redemption is downplayed, though not excluded: McFague emphasized, characteristically, that it 'should include all dimensions of creation, not just human beings' and that it is a fulfilment of that creation, not a rescue from it. This of course brings about a radical shift in the significance of the cross and resurrection of Jesus, whose resurrection is primarily if not exclusively a validation of continued human embodiment. There is, too, an insistence on realized, not final, eschatology. The earth becomes the place 'where we put down our roots', and we live with 'the hope against hope' that all will participate in the resurrection of all bodies. However, God is presently and permanently with humankind: we are 'within the body of God whether we live or die'.

== Criticism ==
Trevor Hart, a theologian from the Barthian tradition, within which McFague herself situated her early work, says that her approach, while it seeks to develop images that resonate with 'contemporary experiences of relatedness to God', shows her to be 'cutting herself loose from the moorings of Scripture and tradition' and appealing only to experience and credibility as her guides. Human constructions determine what she will say about God; her work is mere anthropologizing. The lack of a transcendent element to her work is criticized by David Fergusson as 'fixed on a post-Christian trajectory'.

McFague defended her approach as simply being about a refocusing, a 'turn of the eyes of theologians away from heaven and towards the earth'. She insisted on a relevant theology, 'a better portrait of Christian faith for our day', and reminded us that her approach was not intended as a blueprint, but a sketch for a change in attitude.

== Select bibliography ==
  - (David B. Lott, editor) Sallie McFague: Collected Readings (Fortress Press, 2013) ISBN 9780800699888
- Literature and the Christian Life. New Haven: Yale University Press (1966)
- Speaking in Parables: A Study in Metaphor and Theology. Philadelphia: Fortress Press (1975)
- Metaphorical Theology: Models of God in Religious Language. Philadelphia: Fortress Press (1982)
- Models of God: Theology for an Ecological, Nuclear Age. Philadelphia: Fortress Press (1987)
- The Body of God: An Ecological Theology. Minneapolis: Fortress Press (1993)
- Super, Natural Christians: How we should love nature. Minneapolis: Fortress Press (1997)
- Life Abundant: Rethinking Theology and Economy for a Planet in Peril (Searching for a New Framework). Minneapolis: Fortress Press (2000)
- A New Climate for Theology: God, the World and Global Warming. Minneapolis: Fortress Press (2008
- Blessed are the Consumers: Climate Change and the Practice of Restraint. Minneapolis: Fortress Press (2013) ISBN 9780800699604
- A New Climate for Christology: Kenosis, Climate Change, and Befriending Nature. Minneapolis: Fortress Press (2021) ISBN 9781506478739
