= Louise Pettibone Smith =

American biblical scholar (1887–1981)

Louise Pettibone Smith (1887–1981) was an American biblical scholar, professor, translator, author and social activist. She was the first woman published in the Journal of Biblical Literature in 1917. She later became chair of the American Committee for the Protection of Foreign Born and denounced the House Un-American Activities Committee for its "McCarthyism".

== Early life and education ==
Smith was born in Ogdensburg, New York on October 4, 1887. Her grandfather was one of the founders of the Abolition Society in New York State and her father was an editor of the Republican paper in northern New York.

Smith received her bachelor's degree in 1908, master's degree in 1912, and doctorate in Semitic languages and Palestinian archeology in 1917, all from Bryn Mawr College. Her thesis was titled "The Messianic Ideal of Isaiah." She did graduate work at the Divinity School of the University of Chicago, Radcliffe College, and universities in Germany.

== Career ==
Smith taught English and Latin at Hardin College in Missouri from 1908 to 1911. She received a Thayer Fellowship, an $800 scholarship given by Harvard University and open to men and women, to the American School of Oriental Research in Jerusalem, living there in 1913–1914. In 1915, she was appointed professor in the Department of Biblical History at Wellesley College, serving there until 1953, when she was appointed professor emerita. During the last years of World War II, Smith adjourned her academic work to join the American Association for Greek War Relief, working at a UN refugee camp in Palestine and teaching English at Pierce College in Athens.

Smith became a member of the Society of Biblical Literature in 1915, and in 1917 was the first woman to publish an article in the Journal of Biblical Literature. She served as secretary of the society from 1950 to 1952 and represented the society at the Conference of the United Nations Educational, Scientific and Cultural Organization in New York in 1951.

Smith translated the work of significant German scholars including Rudolf Bultmann (Jesus and the Word 1934; Faith and Understanding 1969), Hans Hofmann (The Theology of Reinhold Niebuhr 1956); and Karl Barth (Theology and Church 1962). In 1958, she and Joseph Haroutunian translated and edited John Calvin's Commentaries from Latin into English. Smith also published her own work in journals, reviews and commentaries. She wrote a commentary on the Book of Ruth with James T. Cleland.

Smith's work on the Bible and Calvin shaped her social perspective, which led to her criticism of US government policies used to silence Cold War dissidents. She saw similarities between what was happening in the US and what she had seen before the war in Germany. In 1951, she was elected chair of the American Committee for the Protection of Foreign Born. In this role she travelled the country speaking about the "promise of a just and free society", which she later documented in the book Torch of Liberty: Twenty-Five Years in the Life of the Foreign Born in the USA (1959). In 1961, she denounced the House Un-American Activities Committee as "both unnecessary and 'un-American'" and called for retractions of the Smith Act and McCarran Act. In 1962, a testimonial dinner was held in New York in her honor, at which she was called "Lover of truth and Crusader for Justice."

== Publications ==
- Pettibone Smith, Louise (2018). The Messianic Ideal of Isaiah: A Dissertation Presented to the Faculty of Bryn Mawr College in Part Fulfilment of the Requirement for the Degree of Doctor of Philosophy, June 1917 (Classic Reprint). FB&C Limited. ISBN 9780267769735.
- Pettibone Smith, Louise (1917). "The Messianic Ideal of Isaiah". Journal of Biblical Literature. 36 (3/4): 158–212. doi:10.2307/3259226. hdl:2027/mdp.39015064318861. JSTOR 3259226.
- Pettibone Smith, Louise (1950). "Review of "Palestine is our Business" by Millar Burrows". American Academy of Religion. 18 (3): 199.
- Pettibone Smith, Louise (1952). "The Book of Micah". Interpretation. 6 (2): 210–227. doi:10.1177/002096435200600207. S2CID 162367399.
- Pettibone Smith, Louise; Cleland, James T. (1953). The Book of Ruth. The Interpreter's Bible. New York: Abingdon-Cokesbury.
- Pettibone Smith, Louise (1959). Torch of Liberty: Twenty-Five Years in the Life of the Foreign Born in the USA. New York: Dwight-King.
