= Journal of the American Society for Premodern Asia =

Journal of the American Oriental Society
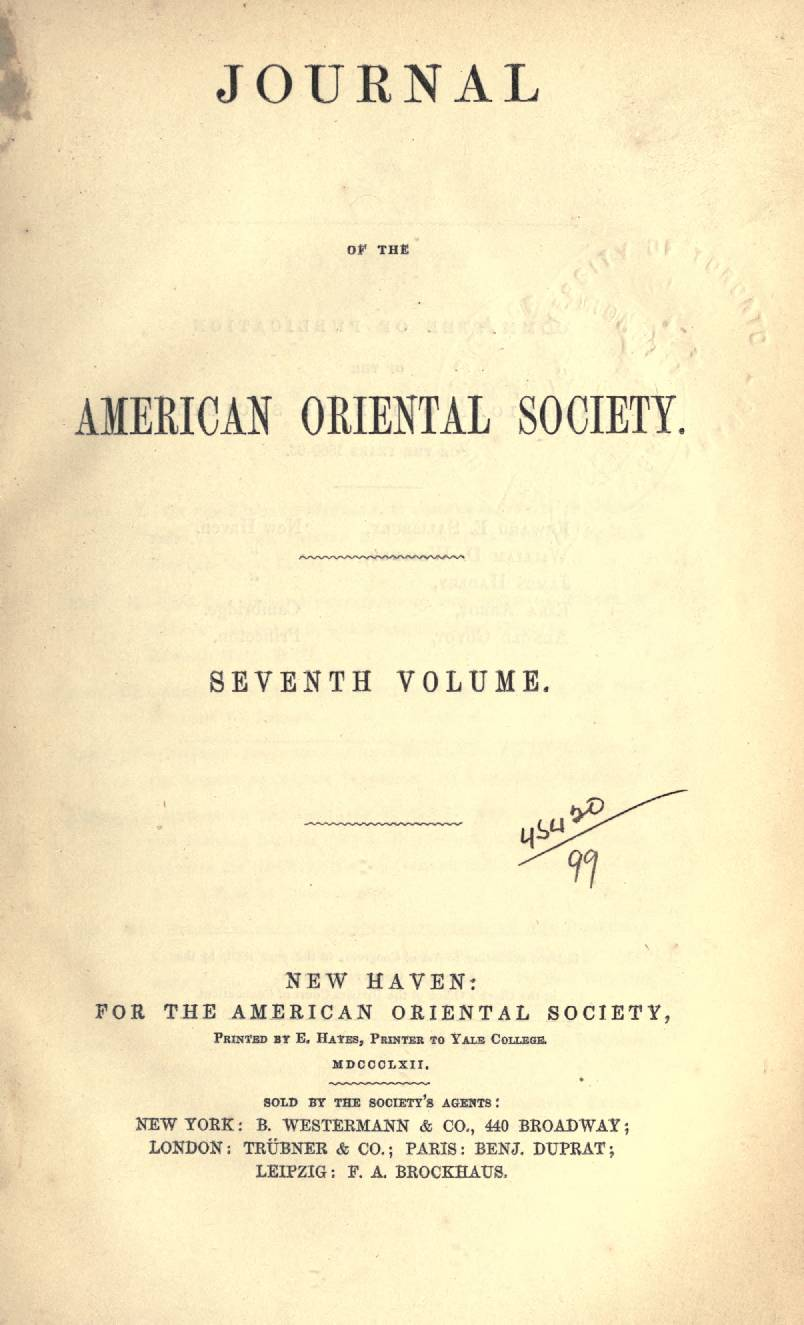
- Discipline: Oriental studies
- Language: English
- Edited by: Peri Bearman

Publication details
- History: 1843–present
- Publisher: American Oriental Society (United States)
- Frequency: Quarterly

Standard abbreviations
- ISO 4: J. Am. Orient. Soc.

Indexing
- ISSN: 0003-0279
- LCCN: 12032032
- JSTOR: 00030279
- OCLC no.: 47785421

Links
- Journal homepage

The Journal of the American Oriental Society is a quarterly academic journal published by the American Oriental Society since 1843. The editor in chief is Peri Bearman (Harvard University). The name was euphemized to The Journal of the American Society for Premodern Asia (JASPA) in 2026.

== See also ==
- List of theological journals
