= Arto Antturi =

Finnish Lutheran priest

Arto Kai Antturi (born Helsinki, 10 June 1961) is a Finnish Lutheran priest. He has previously been the vicar for the parish of Pitäjänmäki.

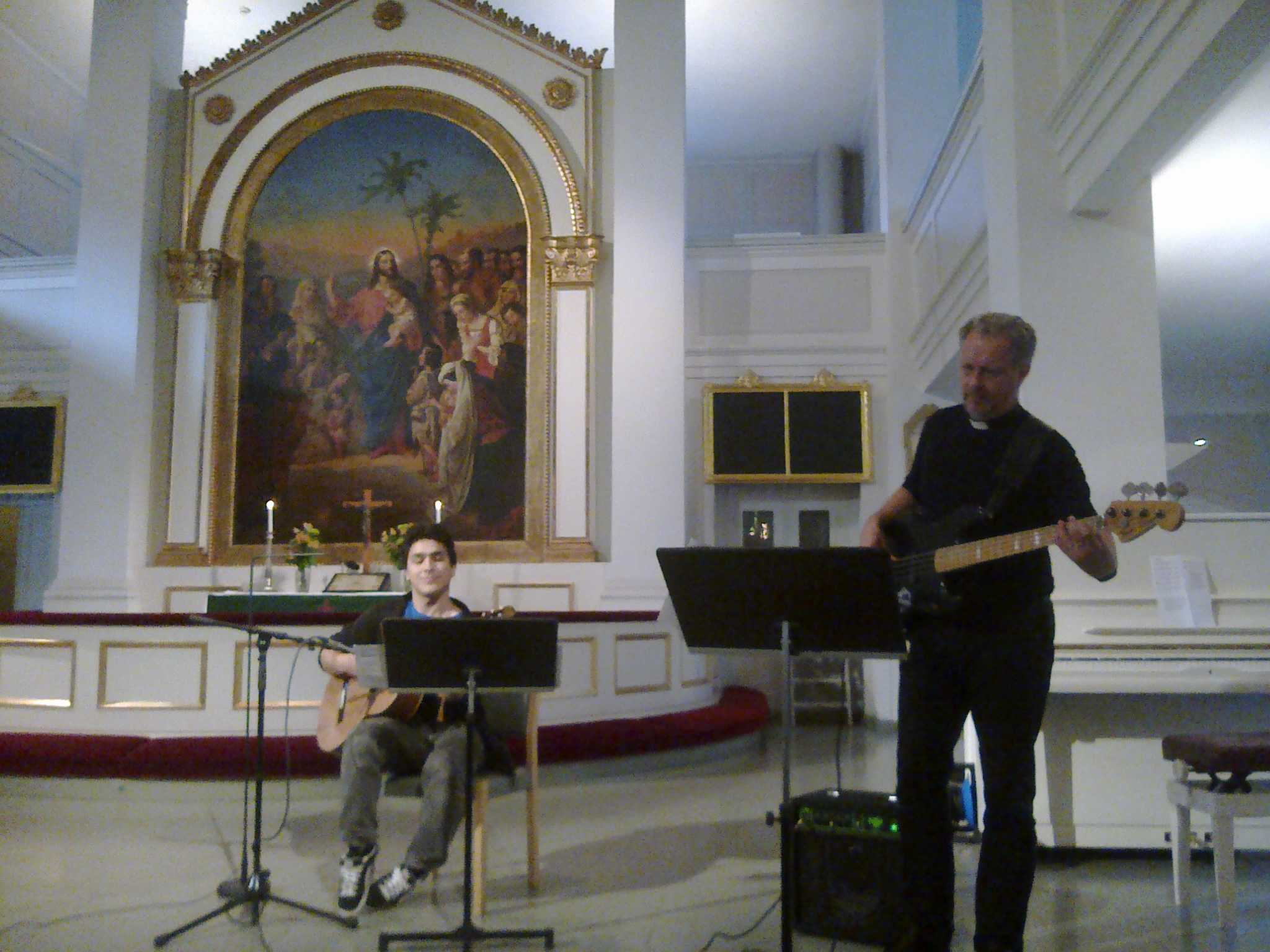
Pastor Arto Antturi (right) on the bass in the Old Church of Helsinki, where he was chaplain.

Arto Antturi’s father was the Pentecostal minister Kai Antturi. Arto Antturi graduated with a master’s degree in theology from the University of Helsinki in 1989. For most of the 1990s, he worked as a research and teaching assistant in the Department of Exegesis at the same university. He received a scholarship from the Alfred Kordelin Foundation in 1992. In 1997, he received a grant from the Finnish Cultural Foundation. He has studied at Vanderbilt University in Nashville, USA.

Later, Antturi lived with his family in Dublin for two years, serving as a priest for the Finnish Seamen’s Mission. At the beginning of 2000, he was appointed as the Executive Director of the Helsinki-based Thomas Community. In 2003, he became a priest in the Cathedral parish and in 2010 became a chaplain in that parish. He served as chaplain at the Helsinki Old Church from 2010 to 2014. He took his office as vicar of Pitäjänmäki on 1 January 2015.

Antturi has been involved in various media work and public duties. In 1987, Antturi co-founded the gospel band Exit and played bass in the band from 1987 to 1991. He was a deputy councillor in Helsinki City Council for the Centre Party in 1997. He has served as the editor of the Thomas Community from 2000 to 2003, as well as a columnist for other magazines, including that for Radio Dei. He has broadcast devotions on Yle Radio 1. In 2009, Antturi ran a fundraising campaign at the Narinkka Square in Helsinki called “The Priest and The Idiot”, in which he read Dostoevsky's work The Idiot for 10 euros a page. This was to raise funds for World Vision's work with poor families in Kenya.
