= George M. Kober Medal and Lectureship =

Two American physician awards

The George M. Kober Medal and Lectureship are two different awards by the Association of American Physicians (AAP) in honor of one of its early presidents, George M. Kober. The George M. Kober Lectureship, is an honor given to an AAP member "for outstanding research contributions which have extraordinary impact on patients"; beginning in 1925, the Lectureship has been awarded every three years. The George M. Kober Medal, started in 1927, has, beginning in 1929, been awarded annually (except for 1944 and 1946) to an AAP member "whose lifetime efforts have had an enormous impact ..."

== Prize winners ==
=== George M. Kober Lectureship ===
- 1925: John J. Abel, Baltimore
- 1928: Simon Flexner, New York
- 1931: Frederick George Novy, Ann Arbor
- 1934: Walter B. Cannon, Boston
- 1937: Ludvig Hektoen, Chicago
- 1940: William George MacCallum, Baltimore
- 1943: Eugene L. Opie, New York
- 1946: Peyton Rous, New York
- 1949: Homer F. Swift, New York
- 1952: Arthur L. Bloomfield, San Francisco
- 1955: James Howard Means, Boston
- 1958: Homer W. Smith, New York
- 1961: Rene J. Dubos, New York
- 1964: Frank L. Horsfall, Jr., New York
- 1967: Francis D. Lukens, Pittsburgh
- 1970: Robert A. Good, Minneapolis
- 1973: Lewis Thomas, New York
- 1977: Arno G. Motulsky, Seattle
- 1980: Grant W. Liddle, Nashville
- 1982: Bengt Samuelsson, Stockholm
- 1985: Oscar D. Ratnoff, Cleveland
- 1988: Anthony S. Fauci, Bethesda
- 1991: Philip W. Majerus, St. Louis
- 1994: Bert Vogelstein, Baltimore
- 1997: Mark Keating, Salt Lake City
- 2000: Francis Collins, Bethesda
- 2003: Stanley Korsmeyer, Boston
- 2006: Robert Lefkowitz, Durham
- 2009: Michael J. Welsh, Iowa City
- 2012: Barry S. Coller, New York
- 2015: P. Frederick Sparling, Chapel Hill
- 2018: Helen H. Hobbs, Dallas
- 2021: Jean Bennett, Pennsylvania

=== George M. Kober Medal ===
- 1927: Victor C. Vaughan and William H. Welch
- 1929: George R. Minot
- 1930: James B. Herrick
- 1931: Henry Sewall
- 1932: Elliott P. Joslin
- 1933: Alfred N. Richards
- 1934: John Jacob Abel
- 1935: Frank B. Mallory
- 1936: Edward R. Baldwin
- 1937: William H. Park
- 1938: Rufus Cole
- 1939: George H. Whipple
- 1940: Frederick F. Russell
- 1941: William de B. MacNider
- 1942: Donald D. Van Slyke
- 1943: Ernest W. Goodpasture
- 1944: No award
- 1945: Oswald T. Avery
- 1946: No award
- 1947: Eugene Floyd DuBois
- 1948: Warfield T. Longcope
- 1949: Alphonse R. Dochez
- 1950: Edwards A. Park
- 1951: James L. Gamble
- 1952: Edward C. Kendall
- 1953: Peyton Rous
- 1954: Herbert S. Gasser
- 1955: William C. Stadie
- 1956: Stanley Cobb
- 1957: Richard E. Shope
- 1958: Arnold R. Rich
- 1959: Robert F. Loeb
- 1960: David Marine
- 1961: Oswald Hope Robertson (1886–1966)
- 1962: William Bosworth Castle
- 1963: John R. Paul
- 1964: J. Howard Means
- 1965: Joseph T. Wearn
- 1966: Joseph C. Aub
- 1967: Isaac Starr
- 1968: Tinsley R. Harrison
- 1969: Dana W. Atchley
- 1970: Dickinson W. Richards
- 1971: W. Barry Wood, Jr.
- 1972: Cecil J. Watson
- 1973: Paul B. Beeson
- 1974: Maxwell M. Wintrobe
- 1975: Walsh McDermott
- 1976: George W. Thorn
- 1977: Robert H. Williams
- 1978: Maxwell Finland
- 1979: Franz J. Ingelfinger
- 1980: Eugene A. Stead
- 1981: A. McGehee Harvey
- 1982: James A. Shannon
- 1983: Lewis Thomas
- 1984: Robert W. Berliner
- 1985: Donald W. Seldin
- 1986: Lloyd H. Smith, Jr.
- 1987: Helen B. Taussig
- 1988: Oscar D. Ratnoff
- 1989: Maclyn McCarty
- 1990: Victor A. McKusick
- 1991: James B. Wyngaarden
- 1992: E. Donnall Thomas
- 1993: Arnold S. Relman
- 1994: David M. Kipnis
- 1995: Alexander Leaf
- 1996: Robert Petersdorf
- 1997: Helen Ranney
- 1998: Eugene Braunwald
- 1999: Jean Wilson
- 2000: J. Claude Bennett
- 2001: Kurt J. Isselbacher
- 2002: Michael Stuart Brown, Joseph L. Goldstein
- 2003: Leon E. Rosenberg
- 2004: K. Frank Austen
- 2005: William N. Kelley
- 2006: David G. Nathan
- 2007: Anthony Fauci
- 2008: Samuel O. Thier
- 2009: Francois Abboud
- 2010: Stuart Kornfeld
- 2011: Robert Lefkowitz
- 2012: Arthur H. Rubenstein
- 2013: John T. Potts, Jr.
- 2014: Elizabeth G. Nabel
- 2015: Francis Collins
- 2016: Peter Agre
- 2017: Laurie H. Glimcher
- 2018: Stuart H. Orkin
- 2019: C. Ronald Kahn
- 2020: Michael J. Welsh
- 2021: Jeffrey I. Gordon
- 2022: Linda Fried
