= Lorber =

Lorber or Lorbeer is a surname with German roots (Lorbeer means Laurel in German).

== Origin and meaning ==
The name "Lorber" probably derives from the German name of the spice Bay Laurel ("Lorbeer") and could therefore refer to an activity as a spice merchant.

These early mentions are recorded in books:

- Hans Bahlow: Deutsches Namenlexion: Godeke oder Godike Lorbere (Rostock 1293), Hermann Lorbere (Hannover 1312), Otto Lorberer (Brünn 1345)
- Freiherr zu Hammerstein: Die Besitzungen der Grafen von Schwerin: Conradus Lorber (Mankemus 1294), Johannes Lorbere und Hubertus Lorberen (Kloster Wienhausen 13. Jh.)
- Alphonse Lorber: Chronik des Dorfes Ebersheim: Ulricus Lorber (Straßburg 1316)
- Duden, Lexikon der Familiennamen: H. Lorber (Nürnberg 1363)

== Known family branches ==
=== Nobility ===
Two aristocratic families by name Lorber are mentioned by nobility directories. Although they share the same name, there seems to be no connection between these families.

==== Lorber (von Störchen) ====
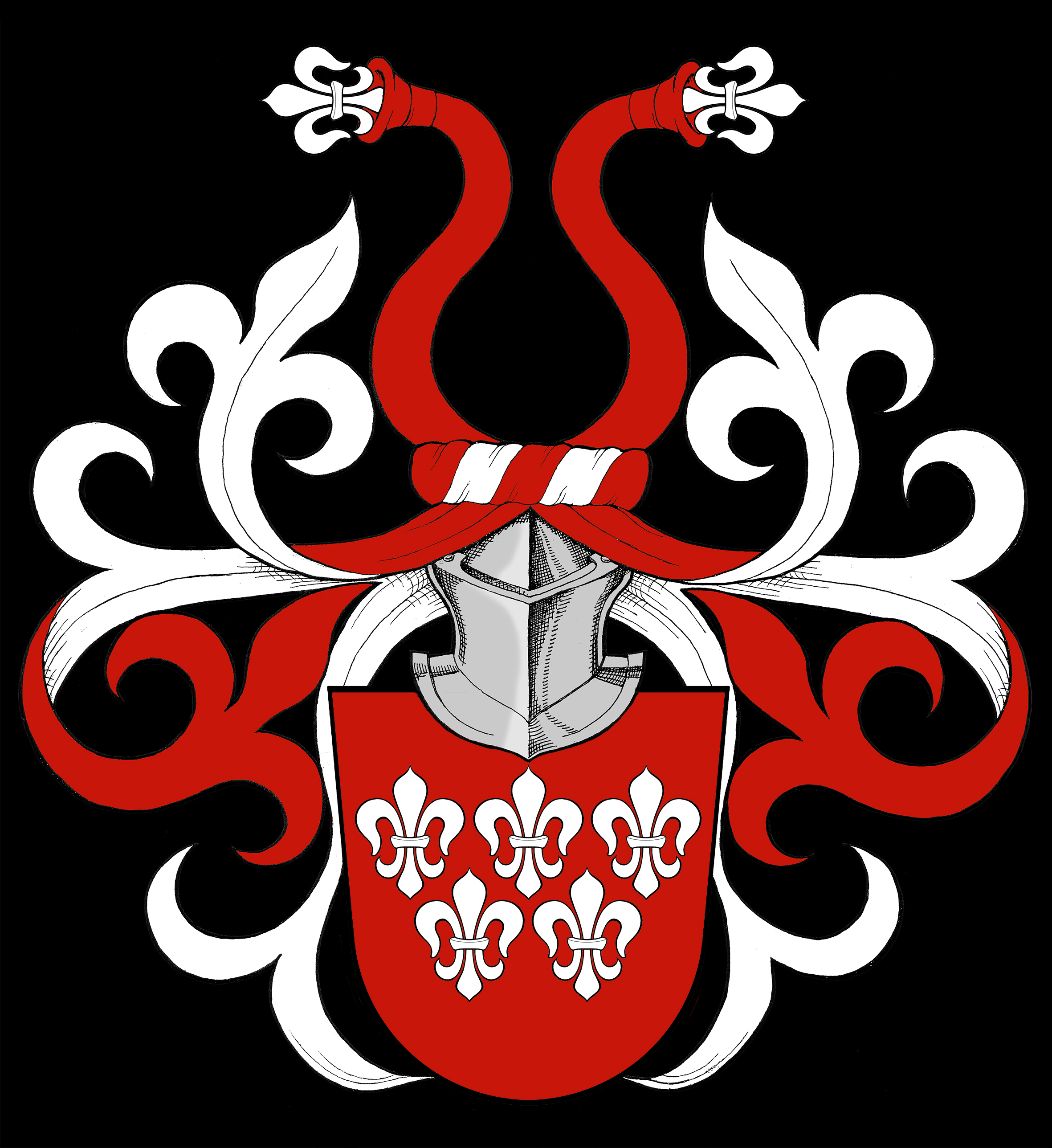
Coat of arms of the Lorber Family (before nobilitation 1571)

The family (von) Lorber, also called "Lorber von Störchen", was found over the centuries in the City Council Bamberg and among the servants of the Prince Bishops.

The family was found up to the Secularization of the Prince-Bishopric of 1802 among the leading offices of the Bishopric and the Council of the City. The last known name carrier was Ignatz Nepomuck Lorber von Störchen (1788–1857). The street name "Lorbersgasse" in Bamberg is keeping the memory of the distinct family.

===== History =====
These Franconian, later Bavarian noble family was mentioned the first time in 1394: A certain Clas or Niklas Lorber is known as a master chef of the Prince-Bishop Lamprecht von Brunn. The historian Konrad Arneth expressed the assumption that there may be a connection to a (still existing) farmer family branch from Stübig. Therefore, it might be possible that the name (after the spice "bay"), is associated with this task as cook.

The family remained in the service of the Prince Bishops and quickly rose through the ranks to able-bodied citizens of the city council. 1412 is Clas Lorber (perhaps the chef said) named as mayor of Bamberg.

The family seems to have come quickly to prosperity in addition to their position in the council. 1445 the family donated a chapel dedicated to Saint Pancras of Rome. 1462 on today's "Am Kranen 14" – the former town port on the banks of the Regnitz – the "Kupferhof der Lorber" (copper-yard) was mentioned. This the copper trading post remained at least until 1635 in family ownership.

1546 Pankraz Lorber is listed as owner of the “Haus unter den Störchen” ("house among the storks") in today's "Dominikanerstraße 4". Meanwhile, this building is located in the well-known Bamberg inn, the "Schlenkerla".

Remaining for generations among the leading families of Bamberg, it was granted to the peerage on September 1, 1571, by Emperor Maximilian II. The document then lists the five surviving sons of Pankraz Lorber as the receivers of the diploma. In the course of the survey the arms of the family had been relieved. The Shield (five silver lilies on a red shield) remained, the ridge has been replaced by a coronet, which were originally silver buffalo horns in the crest now alternately red and silver divided and among them was another silver lily added.

To differentiate from other lines of bourgeois and peasant Lorber-named cousins, the family took the name "Lorber von Störchen". The epithet may refer to either the first known residents of the Austraße 33 (but of 1571 no longer inhabited by the family) or the aforementioned "Haus unter den Störchen" in the Dominkanerstraße. This property was sold in 1677 to the Dominican Order.

Michael Lorber von Störchen, a son of one of the brothers ennobled, wrote a family chronicle in 1613. The family treasures included a silver bowl "of 2 marks and 1 ounce of weight," which Michael, Pancraz and Jobst Justus Lorber decreed in her will. The bowl showed the arms of the Lorber and closely related Haller-family, and the oldest of the family should be inherited.

The Lorbers over the centuries produced many scholars, especially the lawyers and Councillors Thomas Johann Jakob Lorber of storks (1695–1734) or his son Johann Nepomuk Ignatz Christoph Lorber of storks (1725–1797).

The feud of the family were scattered across the Prince-Bishopric of Bamberg. In addition to houses and fields in Bamberg, possessions were also mentioned in Zeil am Main and Scheßlitz. Last family seat was the "Lorberhof" on Jakobsplatz 15 in Bamberg. Unlike the still surviving (albeit uncommon) house name suggests, it was only a few decades in the hands of the family and is now the “Don Bosco St. Joseph's home” as a youth accommodation.

With the end of the Prince-Bishopric of Bamberg and the integration of the city into the Kingdom of Bavaria in 1803, the importance of the family seems to disappear. The last known representatives of the family of storks were Ignaz Nepomuck Lorber (1788–1857), a royal Bavarian captain, who died on June 3, 1857, and his sister Elisabetha von Poschinger, born von Lorber (1790–1859). Ignaz Nepomuck describes himself, in his application for recognition of his noble title, which he addressed to the King of Bavaria, as the last male heir of his family. He and his wife Maria Karolina Kreß von Kressenstein left behind a daughter, Maria Caroline Helena, whose traces disappear after her marriage to Ferdinand Freiherr von zu Rhein 1883 in Augsburg.

===== Possessions and residences =====
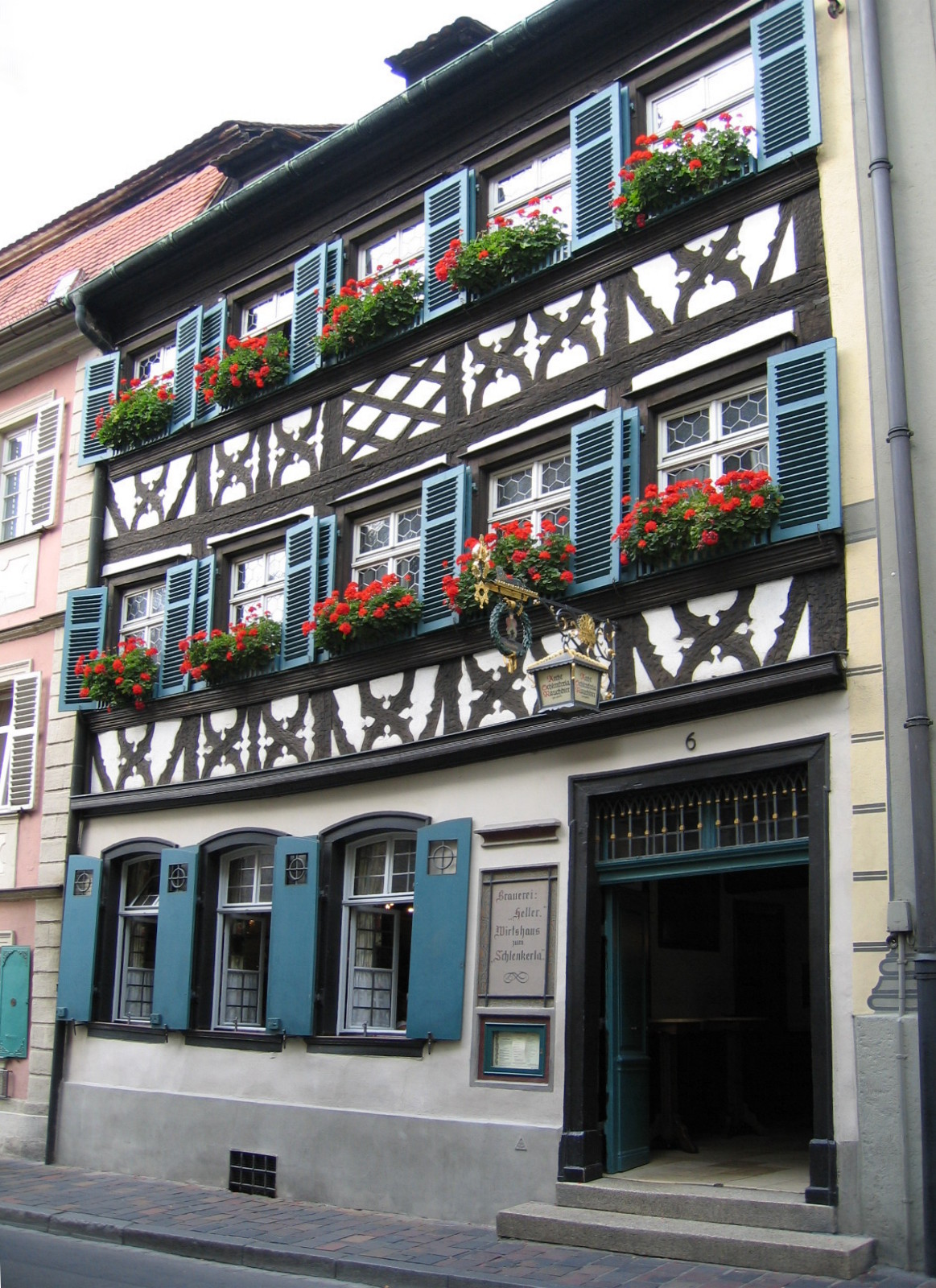
Former "Haus unter den Störchen" – now restaurant "Schlenkerla"

- Austraße 33, Bamberg – "Haus zum Storch," first known ancestral home of the family: 1445 to 1578 Clas Lorber
- Am Kranen 14, Bamberg – "Kupferhof" at the former port town – at about 1462 to about 1635
- Dominikanerstraße 4 – “Haus unter den Störchen” - family seat from 1546 to 1677
- Jakobsplatz 15 – "Lorberhof" – last known family seat

===== Notable members of this family branch =====
- Nikolaus (Clas) Lorber – 1394 Kitchen chef of the Prince Bishop, 1412 Mayor of Bamberg
- Dr. Jobst von Lorber (1533-probably 1587) – requested 1570 with his brother Pancraz on the outskirts of the Diet of Speyer the nobilitation of his family.
- Pankraz von Lorber (1544–1587) – Servant of Archduke Charles of Austria (son of Ferdinand I, Holy Roman Emperor), died in Vienna
- Hans Caspar von Lorber (1560–1626) – Council-memper over 42 periods of office, including nine times Mayor, he survived the Witch-hunt as opposed to two-thirds of the other councils
- Michael von Lorber (1569–1620) – donated a family chronicle, he had to leave Bamberg for Row and Schweinfurt, after he had accepted the Lutheran Confession
- Johann Pancraz von Lorber (1587, 1641–1647) – Captain in the Hatzfeld Regiment during the Thirty Years' War
- Jacob Wilhelm Lorber (1591–1618) – Canon of St. Stephan's Church of Bamberg, killed by two stitches by the organist of St. Martin's Church
- Hans Adam von Lorber (1600–1666) – son of Michael, Mayor of Königsberg, Bavaria
- Daniel von Lorber (1647–1703) – son of Hans Adam took back to the Catholic faith and served again as the Bamberg Prince-Bishops Court as Assessor and Steward
- Johann Christoph Ignaz von Lorber (1725–1797) – Professor of Law aged 24, wrote several scientific papers
- Eberhard Christoph Franz Joseph von Lorber (1755–1812) – to the secularization member of the Bamberg Court and Executive Council, then retired early – never put an application for recognition of nobility to the King of Bavaria
- Ignaz Nepomuck von Lorber (1788–1857) – Royal Bavarian captain, the last male heir of the family

===== Heritage =====
- Lorbersgasse – A street named after the noble family in Bamberg, bordering on the former family owned "Lorbersgarten"

==== Lorber von Lorberau ====
The first member of the Austrian noble family Johann Niclas Lorber was elevated to the peerage in 1741. Members of the family served in the Austria-Hungarian army.

Today, no descendants of the noble Lorber branches are known.

=== Jewish families ===
Jewish Lorbers can be found in the USA. Their name may refer to names like "Lorbeerbaum" and "Lorbeer". Lorber - A very large Jewish family from Czechoslovakia, Hungary, and Poland. Dozens of them were murdered by the Nazis in Auschwitz. The survivors arrived in Israel, the United States and other countries. They established families and today the Jewish Lorber tribe is strong and prosperous

=== Middle class Lorbers ===
Name dictionaries mention several first sources:

- Hans Bahlow, Deutsches Namenslexion: Godeke Lorbere (Rostock 1295), Hermann Lorbere (Hanover 1312), Otto Lorberer (Brno 1345)
- Duden, Lexikon der Familiennamen: H. Lorber (Nuremberg 1363)

== Notable Lorbers ==
- Tim & Jim Lorber, Sports Illustrated Faces in the Crowd 1997
- Chris Lorber, Thiel College All American 2008
- Katie Lorber, professional track block holder
- Joan Lorber, Regina High School Theater All American
- Alan Lorber, arranger, music producer and composer, especially in the 1960s and 1970s
- Bennett Lorber, born 1943, physician and professor of microbiology and immunology at Temple University
- Howard Lorber, born 1948, President of Vector Group Ltd
- Jakob Lorber (1800–1864), a Christian mystic
- Jason Lorber, born 1966, politician from Burlington, Vermont
- Jeff Lorber, born 1952, American composer, jazz musician and record producer
- John G. Lorber, 1941–2021, ex-commander of Pacific Air Forces, Hickam Air Force Base, Hawaii
- John Lorber (1915–1996), ex-professor of paediatrics at the University of Sheffield
- Judith Lorber, born 1931, sociologist
- Martha Lorber (1900–1983), Broadway starlet, dancer, performer at Ziegfeld Follies
- Theodore Lorber (1906–1989), American fencer at 1932 Olympic Games

=== Lorbeers ===
- Hans Lorbeer (1901–1973), German politician and writer
- Johan Lorbeer, German street performer
- Lorbeer Middle School, a school located in the city of Diamond Bar, California

== See also ==
- Lorbeer (disambiguation)
