= Springside Chestnut Hill Academy =

School in Philadelphia, Pennsylvania, US

Location
- 500 West Willow Grove Avenue; Philadelphia, Pennsylvania 19118-4198; United States; 40.06183°N 75.20845°W

Information
- Type: Independent college-preparatory day school
- Religious affiliation: Nonsectarian
- Established: 1861
- NCES School ID: 01197672
- Head of school: Dr. Steve Druggan
- Faculty: 123.3 (on an FTE basis)
- Gender: Single sex from Pre-K through Grade 9, then coeducational in high school
- Enrollment: 1,200 (2025)
  - Pre-kindergarten: 32
  - Kindergarten: 42
  - Grade 1: 48
  - Grade 2: 39
  - Grade 3: 49
  - Grade 4: 55
  - Grade 5: 57
  - Grade 6: 60
  - Grade 7: 71
  - Grade 8: 100
  - Grade 9: 126
  - Grade 10: 121
  - Grade 11: 130
  - Grade 12: 127
- Student to teacher ratio: 8.3
- Campus: 62 acres (250,000 m^{2})
- Colors: Dark Blue, Light Blue, and Gold
- Athletics conference: Inter-Academic League
- Nickname: Blue Devils
- Nobel laureates: Irving Langmuir
- Website: sch.org

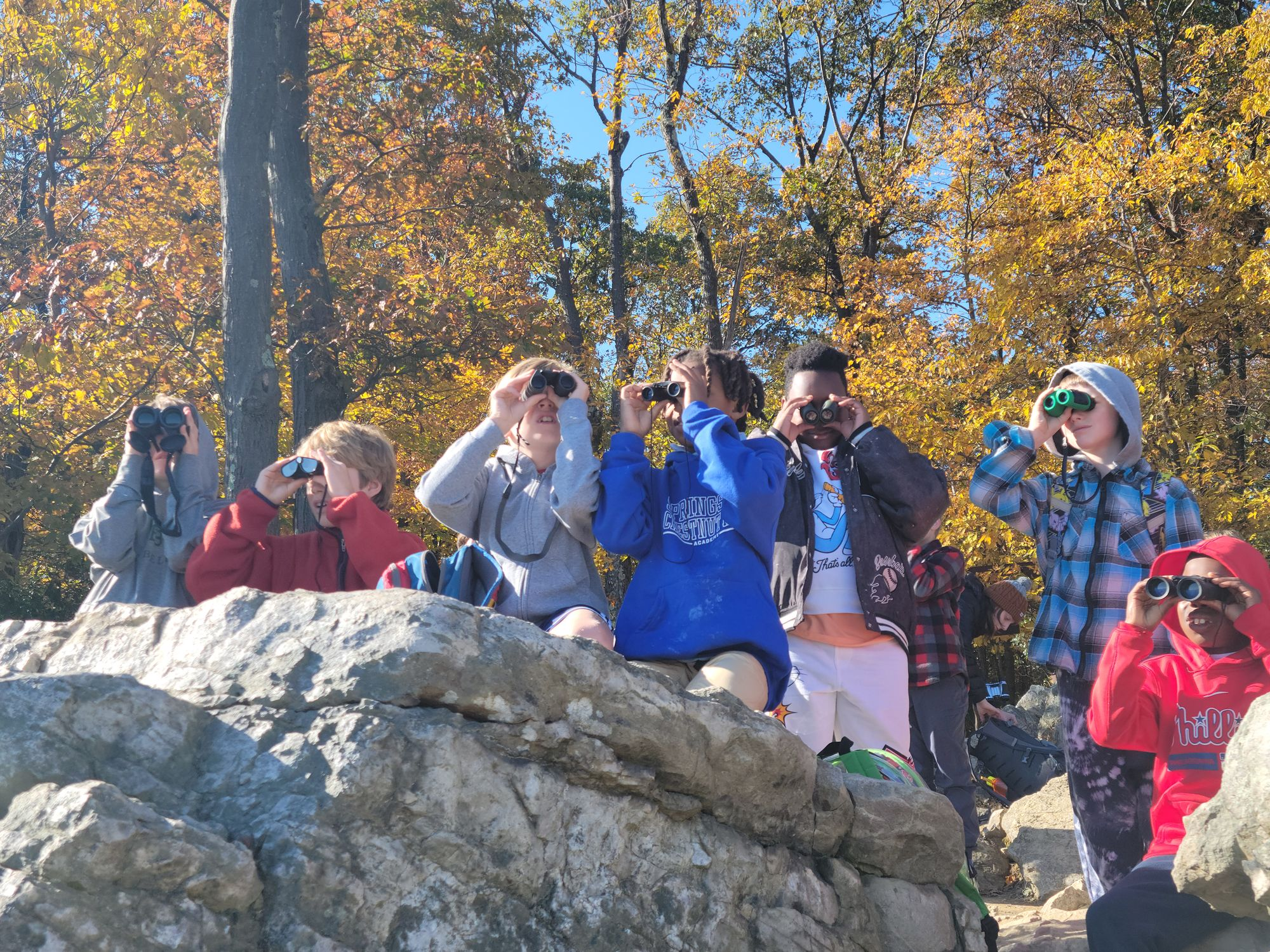
All SCH students make regular trips down to the Wissahickon creek, along its trails, and through its woods, as they develop their sense of environmental stewardship, learn about sustainability, enjoy its natural beauty, and study the challenges facing this native habitat.

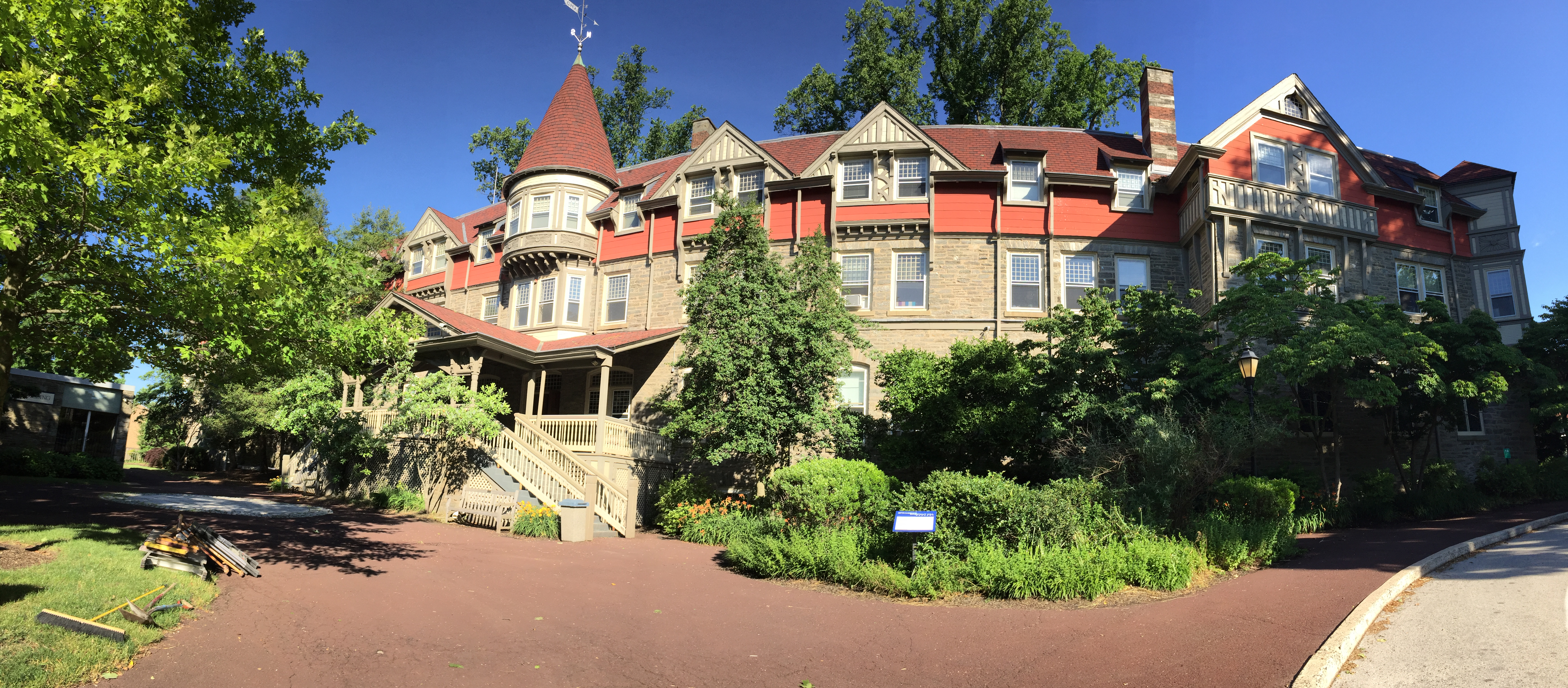
One of the school's buildings is the Wissahickon Inn, a structure that was built in 1884 and is now on the National Historic Registry.

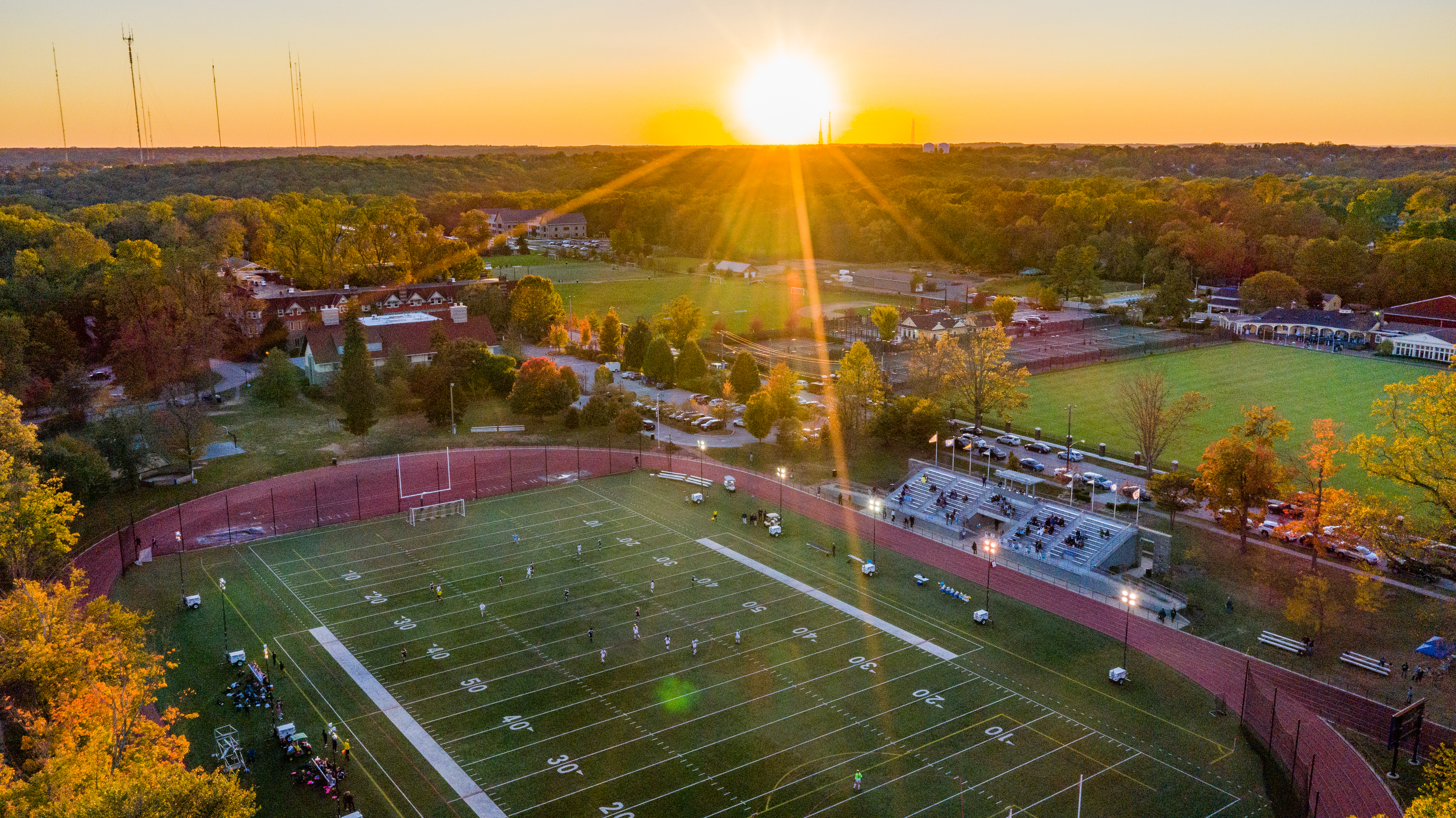
SCH's athletic teams play in the Inter-Academic League (Inter-Ac), which, since its inception in 1887, remains the nation's oldest interscholastic athletic conference.

Springside Chestnut Hill Academy (also known as SCH Academy or SCH) is an independent school in Philadelphia.

== History ==
Springside Chestnut Hill Academy was formed by the 2016 merger between all-girls Springside School and all-boys Chestnut Hill Academy (CHA), private early childhood through grade 12 schools on adjacent campuses.

Founded in 1861, Chestnut Hill Academy was an all-male Pre-K-12 independent college preparatory school located in northwest Philadelphia. CHA was the oldest all-boys school in Greater Philadelphia.

Springside was founded in 1879 by Ms. Jane Bell and Ms. Walter Comegys as a French and English boarding school for young ladies and girls. The school was located on Norwood Avenue in Chestnut Hill, Philadelphia. Springside was initially a boarding school and attracted students from across the Northeast, particularly in New England, where most boarding schools were only for boys.

== Curriculum ==
There are more than 100 electives available to Upper School students, including forensics, architectural design, global economics, and multivariable calculus. There are also more than 40 student-led clubs, boards, and activities. SCH teachers have an average of 18 years of experience, and 73% of faculty hold advanced degrees.

In 2012, SCH Academy established the Sands Center for Entrepreneurial Leadership (CEL) to complement its core curriculum and cultivate an entrepreneurial mindset. Philadelphia magazine named SCH one of 19 area schools rethinking education in big and small ways for its CEL program in 2018. The center is unique in the nation in that the entrepreneurial curriculum is built into student schedules from Pre-Kindergarten through grade 12.

In addition to its Center for Entrepreneurial Leadership, SCH has robotics, arts & new media, outdoor education, and sustainability initiatives.

SCH's FIRST Robotics Competition team competed in close to 20 FIRST Championships, finishing four times in the top 10 and winning the FIRST Chairman's Award eight times. In 2019, Team 1218, SCH's Upper School robotics team, won the FIRST World Championship.

SCH was also one of the first Philadelphia independent schools to offer video production, design, and fabrication classes. Students have won awards in the Greenfield Youth Film Festival, Cappies, Scholastic Art Awards, national DiscoverDesign Competition, Philadelphia Independence Awards, and the WHYY Youth Media Awards.

SCH prioritizes sustainability efforts, including its native arboreta, rain gardens, LEED Gold science, technology center, and rooftop solar panels. SCH earned 3-Star Green Restaurant rating for its school cafeterias and a Green Flag Award from the National Wildlife Federation.

== Extracurricular activities ==
=== Athletics ===
SCH's athletic teams play in the Inter-Academic League (Inter-ac), which, since its inception in 1887, remains the nation's oldest interscholastic athletic conference.

Students can choose from 18 sports, 15 offering junior and varsity levels. The school offers cross country, field hockey, football, golf, soccer, tennis, volleyball, tennis, crew, basketball, ice hockey, track and field, indoor track, squash, wrestling, life sports and fitness, baseball, lacrosse, and softball.

Sports facilities include nine playing fields, two turf fields, the longest continuously used baseball diamond in the U.S., ten squash courts, and an indoor rowing tank. In 2017–2018, SCH won three PAISAA state titles: boys and girls soccer and softball. SCH also won a SEPA championship for girls' soccer and three Inter-AC championships for boys' soccer, softball, and girls' track and field in 2018. In 2021–2022, SCH won two PAISAA state titles: girls' soccer and softball. The crew team sent five boats to Nationals in 2022, and the girls won a National Championship gold medal.

In their third year, the Philadelphia Eagles held training camp at Chestnut Hill Academy prior to the 1935 season.

== Campus ==
The school is situated on a 62-acre campus adjacent to the Wissahickon Creek watershed in Fairmount Park and includes the Wissahickon Inn, listed on the National Register of Historic Places.

It opened its new McCausland Lower School & Commons in the fall of 2019. The learning experience remains single-sex, with gender- and age-specific pre-k to 4th-grade classrooms, while leveraging the benefits of shared common and cooperative space and access to outdoor learning areas. The building is perched on 10 acres of SCH woods adjacent to the Wissahickon Watershed.

In addition to the Lower School, SCH is home to the Thornley Middle School, and Upper School students travel between campuses for the Center for Entrepreneurial Leadership classes, science classes, and robotics & engineering found in the Rorer Science Center. The Upper School's home is in the historic Wissahickon Inn.

In 2020, the school opened its first Early Childhood Center for children ages 18 months to 4 years old. Aligning with SCH's mission to inspire unbounded curiosity and independent thought, the center follows the Reggio Emilia approach.

== Notable alumni ==
- Ibraheim Campbell (2010): an American football safety with the Cleveland Browns who played college football at Northwestern
- Bruce Castor (1979): attorney, former District Attorney of Montgomery County, and former Acting Attorney General of Pennsylvania
- Joseph S. Clark (1918): Philadelphia mayor, 1952–56; U.S. Senator from Pennsylvania, 1957–69
- Mo'ne Davis (2019) – Participant in the 2014 Little League World Series and 2014 AP Women's Athlete of the Year; current softball player at Hampton University
- Michael Fiebach: digital marketing entrepreneur, founder of Fame House.
- Melissa Fitzgerald (1983): Actress and the Senior Director of the nonprofit organization Justice For Vets. She is best known for portraying Carol Fitzpatrick on The West Wing.
- Dan Gargan (2001): defender for the San Jose Earthquakes.
- Thomas S. Gates Jr. (1924): Secretary of the Navy and Secretary of Defense during the Eisenhower Administration.
- Eliza Griswold (1991): Pulitzer Prize-winning American journalist and poet.
- Allyn Joslyn (1919): stage, film, radio, and television actor.
- Mike Koplove (1995): Major League Baseball pitcher. from which he graduated in 1995.
- Jeff Larentowicz (2001): professional soccer player for the Chicago Fire.
- H. Mather Lippincott Jr.: architect
- Fred Lovegrove (1958): Connecticut state senator.
- Dave Sims, sportscaster
- Isaac Starr (1912): developed the first practical ballistocardiograph; Dean of the Perelman School of Medicine at the University of Pennsylvania from 1945 to 1948
- Taylor Ellis-Watson (2011): American track and field athlete. She was a member of the winning relay team for the United States Olympic team in the women's 4×400 meter relay for the 2016 Summer Olympics in Rio de Janeiro.
- Ke'Shawn Williams (2020): NFL wide receiver for the Pittsburgh Steelers
- Lud Wray (1913): former NFL player and coach. First official coach of the Philadelphia Eagles franchise.
