= Edward Baldwin =

Edward Baldwin may refer to:

- William Godwin (pen name Edward Baldwin; 1756–1836), English journalist, political philosopher and novelist
- Edward Baldwin, 4th Earl Baldwin of Bewdley (1938–2021), British educator, hereditary peer and Crossbench member of the House of Lords
- Edward R. Baldwin (1864–1947), American bacteriologist
- Edward Baldwin (character), the lead character of the American science fiction web television series For All Mankind

== See also ==
- Edward Baldwyn (1746–1817), English clergyman and pamphleteer
- Ted Baldwin (disambiguation)
