= Elizabeth Nabel =

American academic

Elizabeth G. Nabel
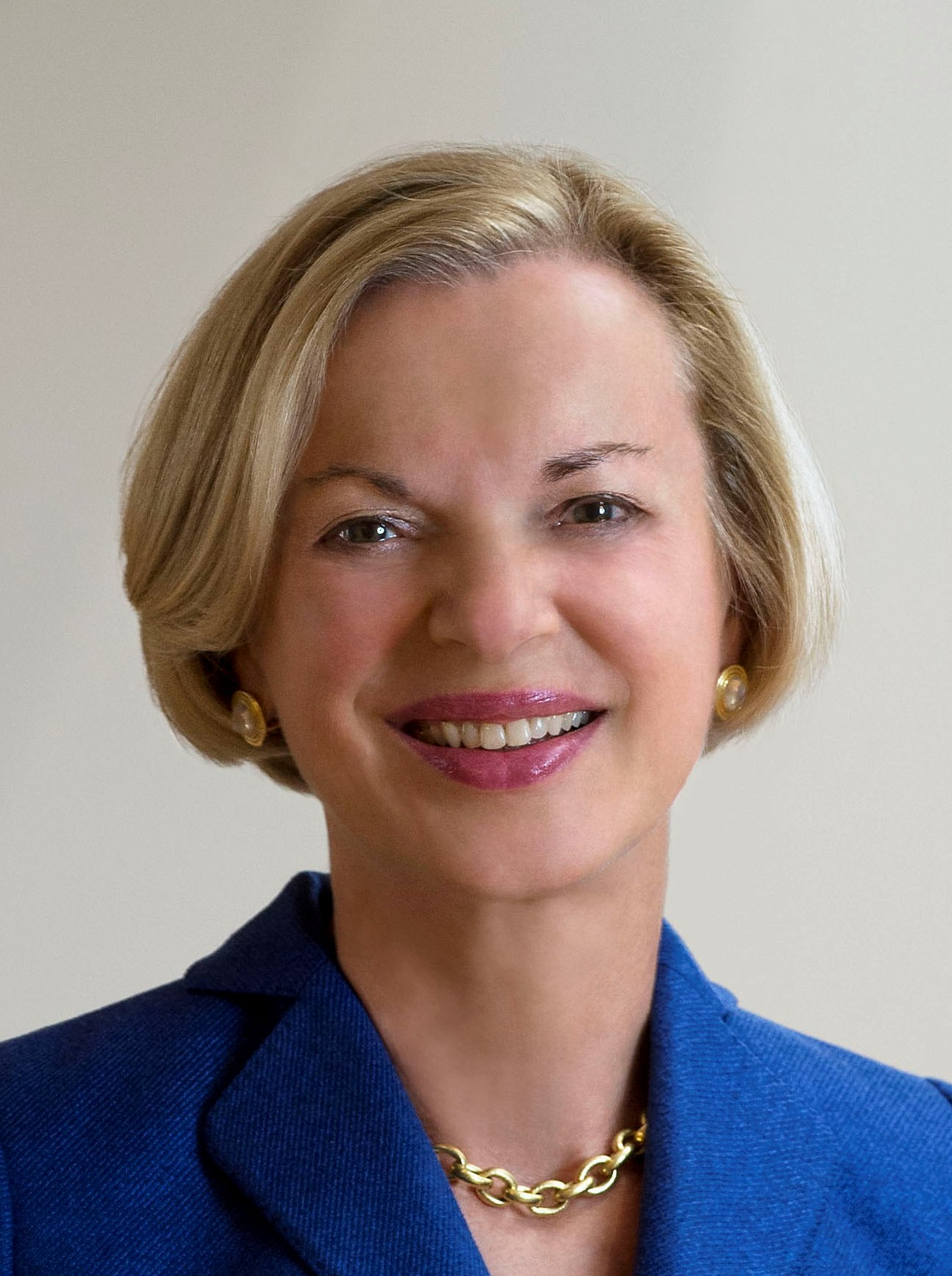
- Education: St. Olaf College; Weill Cornell Medical College; Brigham and Women’s Hospital
- Known for: National Academy of Sciences; Kober Medal, Association of American Physicians, American Academy of Arts and Sciences
- Scientific career
- Fields: Cardiovascular biology Academic Medicine
- Workplaces: US National Heart, Lung, and Blood Institute; Brigham and Women's Hospital; Harvard Medical School; University of Michigan

Elizabeth Nabel is an American cardiologist and Executive Vice President of Strategy at ModeX Therapeutics and OPKO Health. Prior to this role, she served as President of Brigham Health and its Brigham and Women's Hospital, Professor of Medicine at Harvard Medical School, and Director of the NIH's National Heart, Lung, and Blood Institute.

== Early life and education ==
Nabel was born Elizabeth Emilee Guenthner and raised in St. Paul, Minnesota. Nabel became interested in biomedicine during scientific research at St. Olaf College. She graduated summa cum laude from St. Olaf in 1974 and earned her MD degree from Weill Cornell Medical College in 1981. As a senior medical student, she spent a month's elective in cardiology at the Brigham and Women's Hospital.

She later returned to Brigham and Women’s Hospital for her house staff training in internal medicine, interested in linking clinical medicine with research. She considered cardiology the best match for her because she considered it the best specialty to make advances as a physician-scientist.

== Career ==
In 1987, on completion of fellowships in Boston, Elizabeth Nabel and her husband Gary Nabel moved to the University of Michigan, where Elizabeth Nabel ascended through the academic ranks to Professor of Medicine and Physiology and Director of a new, interdepartmental, and multidisciplinary Cardiovascular Research Center and became Chief of the Cardiology Division. Nabel moved to the National Institutes of Health (NIH) in 1999 to become Scientific Director of Clinical Research and Chief of the Vascular Biology Section in the intramural program of the National Heart, Lung and Blood Institute (NHLBI). As director of the NIH’s National Heart, Lung, and Blood Institute from 2005 to 2009, Nabel had a history of advocacy and broadening access to care. She leveraged the $3 billion research portfolio to establish pioneering scientific programs in genomics, stem cells, and translational research. During her tenure, NHLBI was the first NIH institute to expedite review for new investigator research grant applications. She was a co-founder of the Global Alliance for Chronic Diseases. One of her signature advocacy efforts was the Red Dress Heart Truth campaign, which is designed to raise heart awareness among women through industry partnerships.

In 2010, Nabel returned to Brigham and Women’s Hospital as president and Professor of Medicine at Harvard Medical School. At Brigham Health, Nabel led an organizational transformation focused on innovation and building a collaborative culture to reshape healthcare delivery, compassionate care, scientific discovery, and training the next generation of medical and scientific leaders. Her focus was on global expansion of Brigham Health, research commercialization and philanthropy, having raised more than $1.75 billion. In 2021, Nabel joined ModeX Therapeutics, a company she founded with Drs. Gary Nabel and Elias Zerhouni focused on immune therapies for cancer and infectious diseases.

=== Biomedical research ===
Nabel’s work on the molecular genetics of cardiovascular diseases has produced 17 patents and more than 250 scientific publications. Nabel’s scientific contributions in cardiovascular gene transfer have developed molecular and cellular techniques, delineated the pathophysiology of atherosclerosis, and clarified the processes of cell division and growth of vascular smooth muscle cells in blood vessels.

Nabel's studies on Hutchinson-Gilford progeria syndrome have characterized the vascular smooth muscle cell defect leading to premature heart attack and stroke. She conducted clinical studies to understand the contribution of genetic factors to proliferative and inflammatory diseases in blood vessels, including common diseases like atherosclerosis and the rare, premature aging in Hutchinson Gilford progeria syndrome. In November 2020, the U.S. Food and Drug Administration approved lonafarnib, which helps prevent buildup of defective progerin and similar proteins. A clinical trial in 2018 pointed to significantly lower mortality rates ~ treatment with lonafarnib alone compared with no treatment (3.7% vs. 33.3%) ~ at a median post-trial follow-up time span of 2.2 years.

At her NHLBI laboratory, Nabel delineated the mechanisms by which cell cycle and growth factor proteins regulate the proliferation of vascular cells in blood vessels, a process important for the development of atherosclerosis and restenosis. Her vascular biology laboratory characterized the role of cell cycle inhibitors on vascular proliferation and inflammation, and this research has opened up new avenues for therapeutic targets in the vasculature. Nabel contributed to both policy and basic research on embryonic stem cells.

=== National Football League ===
Building on her lifelong commitment to improving health through science, in 2015 Nabel was appointed chief health and medical advisor to the National Football League. In this newly created advisory role, Nabel provided strategic input to the NFL’s medical, health and scientific efforts; participated as an ex-officio member on each of the NFL’s medical advisory committees; and identified areas for the NFL to enhance player safety, care and treatment. Nabel stepped down from this role in 2017 after she guided the NFL to hire its first Chief Medical Officer.

== Boards ==
Nabel serves on the Boards of Medtronic, Moderna, Lyell, Accolade, the Lasker Foundation, and South Florida PBS.

Nabel has served on the editorial boards of eighteen journals, including the New England Journal of Medicine, Science, Journal of Clinical Investigation, Science Translational Medicine, and Circulation.

Nabel served on Moderna’s Scientific Advisory Board at its inception in 2010 and subsequently joined the Board of Directors in 2015. She has helped guide the company through its formative stages and facilitated the development of its technologies, including Moderna’s generation of its COVID vaccine. In August 2020, she temporarily stepped down from the Moderna Board “out of an abundance of caution to avoid any potential of even apparent conflict of interest on her part or Moderna’s part” because Brigham and Women’s Hospital was participating as one of 89 trial sites for the Moderna COVID vaccine. The Boston Globe’s Spotlight raised concerns about Boston hospital presidents, including Nabel, serving on public boards, but these concerns never rose to significance and Brigham and Women’s Hospital “defended Nabel’s presence on the board, saying it did not play a role in choosing the Brigham as a testing site.”

In March 2021, when Nabel stepped down from Brigham and Women’s Hospital she joined Drs. Gary Nabel and Elias Zerhouni at the biotechnology company they co-founded, ModeX Therapeutics.

She rejoined the Moderna Board of Directors in March 2021.

=== Awards ===
Nabel has been named one of the nation’s top leaders in medicine by Modern Healthcare and Becker’s Hospital Review, and one of Boston’s 50 most powerful people by Boston Magazine. Her honors include the Distinguished Bostonian Award from the Greater Boston Chamber of Commerce, the Kober Medal from the Association of American Physicians, the Champion in Health Care award from the Boston Business Journal, and the Rambam Award from Rambam Health Care Campus in Israel. She is a member of the American Academy of Arts and Sciences, the National Academy of Medicine, the Association of American Physicians, the American Society for Clinical Investigation, and she is a Fellow of the American Association for the Advancement of Science.

=== Global health and healthcare ===
Nabel has engaged collaboratively in strengthening healthcare delivery systems in Rwanda, Haiti and China. Supporting [Partners in Health], Nabel helped create and open Butaro Hospital in Northern Rwanda in 2011. Healthcare services from Brigham and Women’s Hospital provided physician, nursing, pathology and cancer care. In 2013, the Medical School and Mirebalais Hospital in central Haiti was opened, offering medical school training for Haiti physicians and medical care. In collaboration with [Dana-Farber Cancer institute], a cancer hospital in Boao China was opened in 2018.
