= Jane F. Desforges Distinguished Teacher Award =

- Date: April 5, 1968
- Country: United States
- Eligibility: Fellow or Master of the ACP
- Formerly called: ACP Distinguished Teacher Award
- Website: American College of Physicians

Jane F. Desforges Distinguished Teacher Award is an annual award of the American College of Physicians (ACP). The award is given to a Fellow or Master of the ACP who has, "demonstrated the ennobling qualities of a great teacher as judged by the accomplishments of former students". (In some years, there have been two winners.) It was originally established as the Distinguished Teacher Award of the American College of Physicians (ACP) on April 5, 1968 by the board of regents. In 2007, it was renamed to honor Jane F. Desforges, the first woman to receive the award, in 1988.

If the winner has not previously been elected a Master of the ACP, they are so recognized.

== Past recipients ==
The following members of the ACP have been selected to receive the Jane F. Desforges Distinguished Teacher Award:

- 1968 – George L. Engel
- 1969 – Eugene A. Stead Jr.
- 1970 – Duncan Archibald Graham, Tinsley R. Harrison
- 1971 – George C. Griffith
- 1972 – Thomas M. Durant
- 1973 – Thomas Hale Ham, Robert F. Loeb
- 1974 – William S. Middleton
- 1975 – Franz J. Ingelfinger
- 1976 – Francis C. Wood
- 1977 – A. McGehee Harvey
- 1978 – William B. Castle
- 1979 – Gerald Klatskin
- 1980 – Donald W. Seldin
- 1981 – Jack D. Myers
- 1982 – Louis Weinstein
- 1983 – C. Lockard Conley
- 1984 – W. Proctor Harvey
- 1985 – J. Willis Hurst
- 1986 – Saul J. Farber
- 1987 – Richard V. Ebert
- 1988 – Jane F. Desforges
- 1989 – Morton N. Swartz
- 1990 – Paul B. Beeson
- 1991 – Telfer B. Reynolds
- 1992 – Norman G. Levinsky, Theodore E. Woodward
- 1993 – Robert G. Petersdorf
- 1994 – Robert A. Kreisberg
- 1995 – Daniel D. Federman
- 1996 – Faith T. Fitzgerald
- 1997 – Walter Lester Henry
- 1998 – Alvan R. Feinstein
- 1999 – Marvin Turck
- 2000 – Thomas E. Andreoli
- 2001 – Norton J. Greenberger
- 2002 – George A. Sarosi
- 2003 – Charles C. J. Carpenter
- 2004 – Herbert L. Fred
- 2005 – Edward C. Lynch
- 2006 – Shahbudin H. Rahimtoola
- 2007 – David B. Hellmann
- 2008 – Matthew A. Araoye
- 2009 – J. Michael Criley
- 2010 – Anthony J. Grieco
- 2011 – Ruth-Marie E. Fincher
- 2012 – Eugene C. Corbett Jr.
- 2013 – Bennett Lorber
- 2014 – Frank M. Calia
- 2015 – John F. Fisher
- 2016 – Joyce P. Doyle, William L. Morgan Jr.
- 2017 – John E. Bennett, Angeline A. Lazarus
- 2018 – Auguste H. Fortin VI, Lisa K. Moores
- 2019 – Lewis E. Braverman, Jeffrey G. Wiese
- 2020 – David V. O'Dell, Douglas S. Paauw
- 2021 – Robert M. Centor, Joseph P. Cleary
- 2022 – Thomas M. De Fer
- 2023 – Lawrence Loo, Martin Samuels
- 2024 – Princy N. Kumar
