= Obstructive fibrinous tracheal pseudomembrane =

- Other names: OFTP
- Specialty: Pulmonology
- Symptoms: Dyspnea, stridor, coughing, acute respiratory distress
- Complications: Asphyxiation
- Prevention: None

Obstructive fibrinous tracheal pseudomembrane (OFTP) is a rare and potentially fatal airway complication most commonly associated with endotracheal intubation. It is characterised by the formation of a fibrin-rich pseudomembrane within the trachea, which can partially obstruct airflow. Symptoms of the complication typically develop hours to days after extubation. These can include dyspnea, stridor, coughing, and acute respiratory distress.

== History ==
Obstructive fibrinous tracheal pseudomembrane was first documented in literature by Swiss forensic pathologist Thomas Sigrist in a 1981 German journal. The condition was formally named and defined by French pulmonologist Gaëtan Deslée and his colleagues in a 2000 study published in the American Journal of Respiratory and Critical Care Medicine. The team studied a series of 10 consecutive cases of patients who similarly developed membranes with white, rubbery characteristics. Deslée's team would discover that the membrane would partially detach and act like a one-way valve. When the patient either lays down or coughs, the membrane would flip across and obstruct the airway, causing immediate asphyxiation.

== Cause ==
OFTP is primarily caused by endotracheal intubation, even of short duration. The condition develops from ischemic injury to the tracheal mucosa caused by pressure exerted by the inflated cuff of an endotracheal tube. The excess pressure causes ischemia and superficial necrosis of the tracheal epithelium, eventually leading to the exudation of fibrin. The accumulation of fibrin would eventually mold and form a pseudomembrane that can acutely block the airway once the tube is removed. Additionally, mechanical trauma to the tracheal mucosa during intubation, suctioning, or repositioning of the tube may contribute to mucosal injury that promotes pseudomembrane formation.

=== Characteristics ===
OFTP is distinguished and defined with the characteristics of the pseudomembrane. It resembles a thick, rubber-like, and whitish appearance when visualised bronchoscopically or via gross examination. The pseudomembrane can mold to the shape of the trachea, and can extend several centimeters along the lumen or near the previous endotracheal tube cuff site. OFTP is predominantly composed of fibrinous material mixed with acute inflammatory cells, however it lacks similarities of granulation tissue or true ulceration seen in other tracheal injuries.

== Diagnosis ==
Diagnosis of OFTP primarily relies on imaging and endoscopic visualisation of the trachea. As it typically presents symptoms of airway obstruction after extubation, a high index of suspicion is required, typically in patients with recent endotracheal intubation. Bronchoscopy is the definitive tool for diagnosing OFTP. It allows direct visualisation of a pseudomembrane adherent to the tracheal wall, usually around the endotracheal cuff.

=== Preventative measures ===
Maintaining appropriate cuff pressure during intubation is known to somewhat mitigate the risks of developing OFTP. High intracuff pressure is thought to cause ischemic injury to the tracheal mucosa by compressing blood vessels and reducing tissue perfusion. In one case report, the cuff pressure was maintained below 15 centimeters H_{2}O throughout intubation, yet pseudomembrane still formed.
