= Edward R. Baldwin =

American bacteriologist

Edward Robinson Baldwin
- Born: September 8, 1864; Bethel, Connecticut
- Died: May 6, 1947 (aged 82); Saranac Lake, New York
- Education: M.D. (1890)
- Alma mater: Yale Medical School
- Known for: Tuberculosis research
- Spouse: Mary Caroline Ives
- Children: Henry Ives Baldwin
- Parents: Elijah C. Baldwin (father); Frances M. Hutchinson (mother)

Edward R. Baldwin (September 8, 1864 – May 6, 1947) was an American bacteriologist. He was president of the American Clinical and Climatological Association in 1910 and the National Tuberculosis Association during 1916–1917.

== Biography ==
He was born in Bethel, Connecticut, the son of Rev. Elijah C. Baldwin and Frances M. Hutchinson. Elijah had one child by his first marriage, and would have four more with Frances. He would serve as pastor in Bethel from 1865 until 1877, when the family moved to New Haven. From 1878 until 1882, Edward attended New Haven High School in Connecticut, whereupon Elijah moved the family to Cheshire, Connecticut. Edward matriculated to the Yale Medical School, paying his own way and graduating in 1890. While interning at Hartford Hospital he developed symptoms of tuberculosis. Baldwin was able to diagnose his disease by identifying the tubercule bacilli with a microscope.

While practicing general medicine in Cromwell, Connecticut, Baldwin developed pulmonary tuberculosis. In December 1892, Baldwin introduced himself to Edward L. Trudeau, and requested treatment for tuberculosis at the Trudeau Sanitorium at Saranac Lake, New York. Finding common interests, Trudeau established a friendship with Baldwin and invited the man to work in his laboratory. Baldwin was appointed assistant and later director of the laboratory, a position he would hold until 1926. When Trudeau died in 1915, Baldwin was elected chair of the executive committee at the Trudeau Sanitorium. In 1916 he founded the Trudeau School of Tuberculosis. With Walter B. James, he established the Edward Livingston Trudeau Foundation, and directed research for this tuberculosis endowment.

On June 1, 1895, Baldwin was married to Mary Caroline Ives. The couple would have one son, Henry Ives Baldwin, born in 1896. Henry would become a forester and naturalist. He served in the US Air Force during both world wars, retiring with the rank of lieutenant colonel. Among his accomplishments, he was professor of forestry at Penn State University, then professor of botany and ecology at Franklin Pierce College.

Edward served as president of the American Clinical and Climatological Association in 1910. He was one of the founders of the National Tuberculosis Association, serving as vice president from 1912 to 1913 and again in 1915–1916. When the president Theodore B. Sachs died suddenly, Baldwin assumed the office as interim president. In the next election in May 1916, Baldwin was chosen as president of the association, serving for a year. In 1917, he became editor-in-Chief of the newly founded American Review of Tuberculosis. He was replaced by Allen K. Krause in 1922, but would remain on the editorial board of the journal for the rest of his life.

After the U.S. entered World War I, Baldwin was a member of the Tuberculosis Consulting Board at Camp Devens. In 1919, at the Conference of Red Cross Societies at Cannes, France, he was a member of the U.S. delegation. In 1927, he was co-author of Tuberculosis, Bacteriology, Pathology and Laboratory Diagnosis. The same year, he was awarded the Trudeau Medal by the National Tuberculosis Association. He was chosen as the Kober medalist by the Association of American Physicians in 1936. During his career, Baldwin authored over 100 papers on the subject of tuberculosis.

== Awards and honors ==
- Master of Arts, Yale (1914)
- Trudeau Medal (1927)
- Kober Medal (1936)
- Doctor of Science, Dartmouth (1937)

== See also ==
- H37Rv
