= Daniel Federman =

American endocrinologist (1928–2017)

Daniel David Federman (1928 – September 6, 2017) was an American endocrinologist. He served as dean for medical education at Harvard Medical School and was involved in implementing its New Pathway curriculum in the early 1990s, and his work helped create the field of genetic endocrinology. Federman also worked for over thirty years at Boston's Brigham and Women's Hospital, a Harvard Medical School teaching hospital in the Longwood Medical and Academic Area.

== Career ==
Federman was born in New York City in 1928, the son of European immigrants who settled in the Bronx. He graduated summa cum laude from Harvard College in 1949 and magna cum laude from Harvard Medical School in 1953.

Following an internship and residency at Massachusetts General Hospital (MGH), he became a clinical associate at the National Institute of Arthritis and Metabolic Disease (NIAMS) where, under the guidance of Ed Rall, he studied the effects of androgens on thyroid function, thyroxine metabolism, and thyroxine-binding protein. In 1957, he began a two-year clinical research fellowship with Sir Edward Pochin at the University College Hospital Medical School, London, pioneering in the use of radioactive iodine for the treatment of thyroid cancer.

He was also an endocrinologist specializing in diabetes and hormones and practicing clinical medicine in Brookline, Massachusetts.

He returned to Harvard Medical School and Massachusetts General Hospital in 1964, serving as chief of endocrinology. He continued as assistant chief of medical services in 1967, associate professor of medicine in 1970, and associate chairman of medicine in 1971. In 1973, Federman was recruited to become physician-in-chief and chair of the Department of Medicine at Stanford University.

From 2000 to 2007, Federman was senior dean for alumni relations and clinical teaching at Harvard Medical School. After he retired in spring 2007, he served in Miami for over six years as an adjunct professor at the University of Miami's Miller School of Medicine.

== Personal life ==
As a medical student at Massachusetts General Hospital in Boston, Federman met his wife Elizabeth (Betty) Buckley. They had two daughters, one of whom graduated from Harvard Medical School while he was serving as Harvard Medical School's dean of medical education.

He contributed to the work of the Longwood Symphony Orchestra in Boston.

== Honors ==
Harvard Medical School:

- Daniel D. Federman Staff Award for Exceptional Service to HMS/HSDM
- The White House Commission on Complementary and Alternative Medicine Policy
- Named Chair, Daniel D. Federman, MD Professor in Residence of Global Health and Social Medicine and Medical Education, currently held by Edward M. Hundert, MD, also current dean for Medical Education at Harvard Medical School
- Chair of the advisory board, Scholars in Clinical Science Program, Harvard Medical School

Medical education:

- President of the American College of Physicians
- Carl W. Walter Distinguished Professor of Medicine and Medical Education at Harvard Medical School
- Massachusetts Physician of the Year
- Distinguished Teacher Award of the American College of Physicians
- Endocrine Society Distinguished Educator Award
- Abraham Flexner Award for Distinguished Service to Medical Education, Association of American Medical Colleges (AAMC)
- David Rall Medal, Institute of Medicine
- Adjunct Professor at University of Miami's Miller School of Medicine for over six years as its Laurence Fishman visiting professor.

He authored at least 67 works in 207 publications in four languages and 7,370 library holdings and continued publishing in refereed journals until at least 2011.
