= Isaac Starr =

American physician, heart disease specialist and clinical epidemiologist

- Born: March 6, 1895; Philadelphia, Pennsylvania
- Died: June 22, 1989 (aged 94); Roxborough, Philadelphia, Pennsylvania
- Education: University of Pennsylvania School of Medicine, 1920
- Occupation: Physician
- Known for: developed the first practical ballistocardiograph
- Awards: Albert Lasker Award for Basic Medical Research (1957); Kober Medal (1967); Burger Medal (1977)

Isaac "Jack" Starr (March 6, 1895 – June 22, 1989), known as the father of ballistocardiography, was an American physician, heart disease specialist, and clinical epidemiologist notable for developing the first practical ballistocardiograph. His early academic positions included being an assistant professor in pharmacology and later the first Hartzell Professor of Research Therapeutics at the Perelman School of Medicine at the University of Pennsylvania as well as dean of the school from 1945 to 1948.

== Education ==
Starr attended primary and secondary school in Philadelphia, graduating from the Chestnut Hill Academy in 1912. From there he went to Princeton University where he received his Bachelor of Science degree, graduating magna cum laude in 1916. He received his Doctor of Medicine degree from the Perelman School of Medicine at the University of Pennsylvania in 1920.

After receiving his M.D., Starr went to Massachusetts General Hospital in Boston where he completed his internship before returning to Penn, where he later became a heart disease specialist, motivated by the heart disease-related death of his mother.

== Career ==
After returning to Penn, Starr joined Alfred Newton Richards' group investigating mechanisms by which the kidney created urine. At the request of Richards, Starr became one of the first assistant professors at the University of Pennsylvania School of Medicine in 1928, doing research which used physics and mathematics in the study of the heart, and leading a course in clinical pharmacology for the medical students.

In 1933, he became the first Hartzell Professor of Research Therapeutics at the University of Pennsylvania School of Medicine and held the position until 1961. The endowed chair funded everything except for salaries for his research assistants.

Starr had known that heart disease could precede congestive heart failure by several years, but at the time heart disease was typically diagnosed at autopsy by a pathologist. This led him, shortly after joining Penn, to participate in a cardiac output methods program by the American Physiological Society. At this program, his colleague, Yandell Henderson, demonstrated an apparatus for measuring cardiac output, a ballistocardiograph. This project, a suspended bed rigged with springs to pick up resonance frequencies and amplify them, inspired Starr to develop a practical version for use in his own research, with the help of the Eldridge Reeves Johnson Foundation for Medical Physics. This new device used an optical recording system for more accurate readings, however, due to the low natural frequency of heartbeats, patients had to hold their breath while using it.

The issue with led him to modify the design of the bed to counteract the minute movements using springs, thereby fixing this flaw and allowing the patients to breathe. The final device, introduced in November 1939 by Starr and Dr. Henry A. Schroeder, was used to measure cardiac output and led to the first accurate physical measurements and to detection of when the heart chambers do not contract simultaneously. The most notable use, however, was that of detecting heart abnormalities much earlier and more accurately in patients, leading to further development and extensive contributions to the field from 1930 to 1960.

Before the redesign, however, in 1936, Starr had secured records on multiple healthy people, namely medical students, faculty, friends, and family members. Over the next 40 years, he would study his subjects and eventually report a clinical series on them, detailing such observations as, "Patients with clinical evidence of ischemic heart disease who also had abnormal BCGs developed twice as many recurrences as did those having ischemic heart disease and normal records."

During World War II, Isaac Starr and Dr. Eugene A. Stead were members of a committee of the National Research Council that was tasked with deciding which chemicals and medications were considered important to medicine. Stead noted in a memoir he felt indebted to Starr for taking him to the National Gallery of Art during some free hours after a day of work which lead to his appreciation of art.

Starr was one of the first people to suggest that venous congestion was related to the volume of blood and the muscle tone of the vessels, while a weakened heart's contributions were less important than previously thought. He also questioned whether the kidney and its endocrine function were involved in the disease's pathogenesis.

The University of Pennsylvania held a symposium in honor of Isaac Starr in 1978, and then awarded Starr with an honorary Doctor of Science (Sc.D.) degree in 1983 for his contributions to medicine.

== Awards ==
- Albert Lasker Award of the American Heart Association (1957) "for fundamental contributions to knowledge of the heart and the circulation, and for his development of the first practical ballistocardiograph"
- Kober Medal of the Association of American Physicians (1967)
- Burger Medal of the Free University of Amsterdam (1977)

== Selected publications ==
- Starr, Isaac (1978). Alfred P. Fishman (ed.). Heart Failure. Washington: Hemisphere Pub. Corp. ISBN 978-0-07-021118-6. LCCN 78059673.
- Starr, Isaac; Alfred Newton Richards (November 1969). "Alfred Newton Richards, Scientist and Man". Annals of Internal Medicine. 71: Suppl 8:1–89. PMID 4901554.
- Starr, Isaac; Abraham Noordergraaf (1967). Ballistocardiography in cardiovascular research: Physical aspects of the circulation in health and disease. Philadelphia: Lippincott. LCCN 67020019.
- Starr, Isaac (1965). "Progress towards a Physiological Cardiology". Annals of Internal Medicine. 63 (6): 1079–1105. doi:10.7326/0003-4819-63-6-1079. PMID 5320951.
- Starr, Isaac (1964). "Prognostic Value of Ballistocardiograms". Journal of the American Medical Association. 187 (7): 511–517. doi:10.1001/jama.1964.03060200043008.
- Starr, Isaac; Francis C. Wood (1961). "Twenty-Year Studies with the Ballistocardiograph: The Relation between the Amplitude of the First Record of "Healthy" Adults and Eventual Mortality and Morbidity from Heart Disease". Journal of the American Heart Association. 23 (5): 714–732. doi:10.1161/01.CIR.23.5.714.
- Starr, Isaac (1953). Physiologic therapy for obstructive vascular disease. New York: Grune & Stratton. LCCN 53006413.
- Starr, Isaac; Francis C. Wood (1943). "Studies with the ballistocardiograph in acute cardiac infarction and chronic angina pectoris". Journal of the American Heart Association. 25 (25): 81–101. doi:10.1016/S0002-8703(43)90383-7.
