= Henry Schroeder =

Henry Schroeder may refer to:

- Henry F. Schroeder (1874–1959), U.S. Army soldier and Medal of Honor recipient
- Henry A. Schroeder (1906–1975), American physiologist and writer
