= Eugene A. Stead =

American physician (1908–2005)

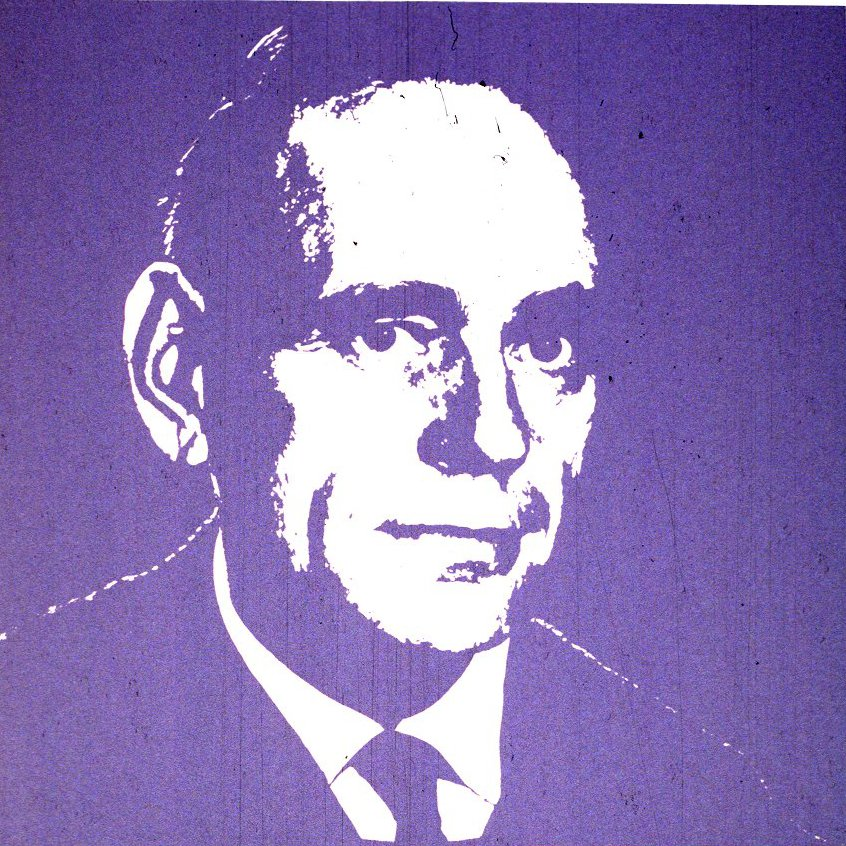

Eugene Anson Stead Jr. (October 6, 1908, in Atlanta, Georgia – June 12, 2005) is best known as a physician, medical educator, and researcher. He served on the faculties at Harvard, Emory (where he received a Bachelor of Science and MD degree), and Duke universities. He is the founder of the physician assistant (PA) profession.

== Emory University ==
As an undergraduate at Emory University, he earned his tuition by working in the biology department as a student assistant. Following his obtainment of an MD Degree, he interned in internal medicine and surgery at the Peter Bent Brigham Hospital in Boston, Massachusetts, and also at Cincinnati General Hospital and Boston City Hospital. By age 33, he had become a professor of medicine at Emory. He believed that medical school could be shortened to two years to allow for a greater deal of time as a physician and financial savings. While Stead was a professor, he gave a talk to one of the medical organizations in Atlanta, Fulton County Medical Society, describing his points of reasoning regarding medical school. His views were made public by local newspapers and were viewed as slightly radical, resulting in the president of Emory University calling him and verbally reprimanding him.

== Leadership positions at Emory University and Duke University ==
The timeline of his leadership positions at Emory University started at 1942 through being a chairmen of the Department of Medicine. Four years later he became Dean of the School of Medicine at Emory University. Following this he became a professor of medicine and Chairmen of the Department of Medicine at Duke University for 20 years. Many of his students and mentees went on to become notable researchers and educators.

== Creation of the Physician Assistant Program ==
Stead believed that some of the skills that a doctor has to do in practice become habit. Therefore he believed that health professionals other than a physician could learn the general skills of a doctor in a shorter amount of time. His curriculum was inspired by the short intensive training of doctors during World War II. Additionally, because there were corpsmen during World War II and the Vietnam War who were taught how to do emergency medicine in terms of paramedical skills, the creation of the physician assistant program provided them a medium to continue their application of the training and skills they had learned.

In 1967, he graduated the first class of physician assistant students from Duke University's PA program. His educational philosophy placed emphasis on applying medical knowledge specifically to a patient, rather than the focus being on memorizing a large quantity of information. He wanted all PAs to be required to have mentoring relationships with physicians to ensure access to a larger body of medical knowledge.

== Awards ==
- American College of Physicians Distinguished Teacher Award
- The Association of American Medical Colleges' Abraham Flexner Award for Distinguished Service to Medical Education
- Kober Medal from the Association of American Physicians
- Durham North Carolina's City of Medicine Award
- William G Anlyan, MD Lifetime Achievement Award from Duke University

== Personal life ==
Eugene Stead and his wife Evelyn had three children. As a 25-year family project, they built a house at Kerr Lake.

== Impact ==
There are now more than 306 PA programs in the US. National PA day is celebrated in many places on October 6 to commemorate the day the first class of PAs graduated from Duke University in 1967. It happens to coincide with Dr. Stead's birthday. The job outlook for physician assistants is projected to be 27% between the years of 2022-2032, which is faster than average.

Nationally, there is a healthcare worker shortage. The healthcare profession that is suffering the most from this shortage, however, are physicians. Studies and surveys have found that the majority of Americans who have personally been treated by a PA or have a family member who has, were satisfied, which points to physician assistants being able to support physicians and alleviate the burden of the shortage. Legislation that has allowed to an expansion of the scope of practice from physician assistant's has been met with pushback from the American Medical Association, who warn of the dangers to patient safety and emphasize that PA's work best within a physician-led team.

Eugene Stead's research in the 1940s paved the way for cardiac catheterization in medicine, which is now used to treat heart failure.

== Medical positions ==
- Chair Dept. of Medicine, Emory University (1942-46)
- Dean of the School of Medicine, Emory University (1945-46)
- Chair Dept. Of Medicine, Duke University (1947-1967)

== See also ==
- Eugene A. Stead, Jr. Thoughts, Insights and Learning - Emphasizes Eugene Stead, Jr.'s medical achievements
- Eugene A. Stead Papers at Duke University Medical Center Archives
- Physician Assistant Program at Duke University: History
- American Academy of Physician Assistants
- Central Application Service for Physician Assistants (CASPA)

== Sources ==
- https://web.archive.org/web/20060926160931/http://www.pahx.org/archives_detail.asp?ID=149 - Contains digital photos of letters written by Eugene A. Stead Jr.
