= Lorbeer =

Lorbeer is the German word for laurel. It may refer to:

- G. W. Lorbeer -botanist of the early 20th century
- James W. Lorbeer -American botanist and professor at Cornell University
- Johan Lorbeer -a German street performer
- Lorbeer Middle School -school in Diamond Bar, California
