= Michael Fiebach =

American entrepreneur and businessman

Michael Fiebach (Mike Fiebach) is an American entrepreneur and businessman; he is the founder of Fame House, an e-commerce and digital marketing agency focused on the music industry with clients such as Eminem, Tiesto, Pearl Jam, Ice Cube, and Amanda Palmer. Fiebach sold Fame House to SFX Entertainment in 2013 for an undisclosed sum. In May 2016, Universal Music Group acquired Fame House from SFX, and Fiebach remained as the CEO. Fiebach worked for the electronic music producer DJ Shadow from 2006 to 2010, running his online operation and merchandise business. Fiebach wrote a series of blog entries for Hypebot.com about his experience touring with DJ Shadow in 2010.

Fiebach is also the Founder and CEO of Mainfactor, an e-commerce company building and managing d2c brands and storefronts with artists and creators, the company announced its launch in 2021 following a capital raise led by venture capital firm Upper90.

== Early life and education ==
Fiebach attended Springside Chestnut Hill Academy in Philadelphia, college at San Francisco State University, and later attended Temple Law in Philadelphia.

== Public appearances ==
Michael has spoken at music and tech conferences including SXSW, Bandwidth, SF MusicTech, Digital Music Week, Philadelphia Music Startup Academy at Drexel University and Grammy futureNOW

== Awards ==
In 2016, Michael and Fame House were recognized as a Philadelphia Future 50 company by SmartCEO. These awards are given to the fastest-growing mid-sized companies in the region. In 2024, Mainfactor was number 58 on the Inc 5000 list of fastest growing companies in America.
