= Ted Baldwin =

Ted Baldwin may refer to:

- Ted Baldwin (politician) (1922–2008), member of the Queensland Legislative Assembly
- Ted Baldwin, fictional character in All for Peggy
- Ted Baldwin, fictional character in The Sins of the Children
- Ted Baldwin, fictional character in The Valley of Fear
- Ted Baldwin Field in Kearney, Nebraska

== See also ==
- Edward Baldwin (disambiguation)
- Theodore Baldwin (1839–1925), US military officer
