= William Nimmons Kelley =

American physician (born 1939)

- Born: June 23, 1939 (age 87); Atlanta, Georgia
- Education: Emory University
- Scientific career
- Workplaces: Perelman School of Medicine
- Academic advisors: J. Edwin Seegmiller
- Notable students: Beverly Davidson, James Wilson (scientist)

William N. Kelley is an American physician who was the chief executive officer of the University of Pennsylvania Health System. Kelley was a professor of biological chemistry and internal medicine at University of Michigan from, 1975 to 1989. He is best known for his role in creating the University of Pennsylvania Health System. He is also known for Kelley's Textbook of Internal Medicine.

== Education and Research ==
Kelley earned his Bachelor's and Doctor of Medicine from Emory University in 1963. Kelley then trained with J. Edwin Seegmiller at the Arthritis and Rheumatism Branch of the National Institutes of Health. He did his residency at the Massachusetts General Hospital in 1968. Kelley joined the faculty at Duke University in 1968 where he became chief of the Division of Rheumatic and Genetic Diseases and professor of biochemistry. He then joined University of Michigan as the chair of the department of internal medicine from 1975 to 1989 where he build Michigan into one of the top departments in the country.

In 1989, he became the Dean of the Perelman School of Medicine at the University of Pennsylvania. There he conceived of and built the University of Pennsylvania Health System in 1993, the nation's first fully integrated academic health-care system. Because of financial worries in 2000, Kelley was dismissed as CEO and replaced by Peter Traber.

He is the recipient of the 2005 Kober Medal and the 2000 Emory Medal. He is a member of the National Academy of Medicine.

== Personal life ==
Kelley was born in Atlanta Georgia and grew up in West Palm Beach, Florida. He was married to Lois Faville Kelley who he was friends with since kindergarten. Lois passed away in 2018. He has four children, Paige, Ginger, Lori, and Mark, and nine grandchildren, Caddie, Jamie, Haley, Duncan, Miranda, Noah, Rowan, William, and Reese
