= Henry A. Schroeder =

American physiologist and writer

Henry Alfred Schroeder
- Born: June 18, 1906; Short Hills, New Jersey
- Died: 1975 (aged 68–69); St. Thomas, Virgin Islands
- Occupations: Physiologist, writer

Henry Alfred Schroeder (June 18, 1906 - 1975) M.D., F.A.C.P was an American physiologist and writer.

Schroeder was born in Short Hills, New Jersey and graduated from Yale College in 1929. He obtained his medical degree from the Columbia University Vagelos College of Physicians and Surgeons in 1933. During 1939-1942 he served as an assistant in medicine at Rockefeller Institute Hospital.

Schroeder worked with Isaac Starr in developing the ballistocardiogram, a device used to detect abnormalities in cardiac function. Schroeder served in the United States Navy and attained the rank of commander. He was a pioneer in aerospace physiology and known for his scientific contributions to the prevention and treatment of hypertension and prevention of diseases caused by imbalance of trace elements.

In 1941, Schroeder was the first scientist to notice the importance of salt as compared to water in the management of congestive heart failure. Schroeder's major contribution to the prevention of chronic disease was his development of the low sodium diet which is used widely today in treatment of hypertension. Between 1937-1958 he published over 100 papers on hypertension in medical journals. He was director of the Dartmouth Medical School Trace Elements Laboratory and became emeritus professor of physiology at Dartmouth College.

Schroeder's best known work was The Poisons Around Us, first published in 1974. The book documented the toxic effects of metals and the health impact of deficiencies of essential elements in the American diet. He was a fellow of the New York Academy of Medicine. Schroeder died at his home in St. Thomas, Virgin Islands.

== Selected publications ==
- Mechanisms of Hypertension (1957)
- A Matter of Choice (1968)
- Pollution, Profits & Progress (1971)
- The Trace Elements and Man (1973)
- The Poisons Around Us (1974, 1994)
