= Chicago Municipal Tuberculosis Sanitarium =

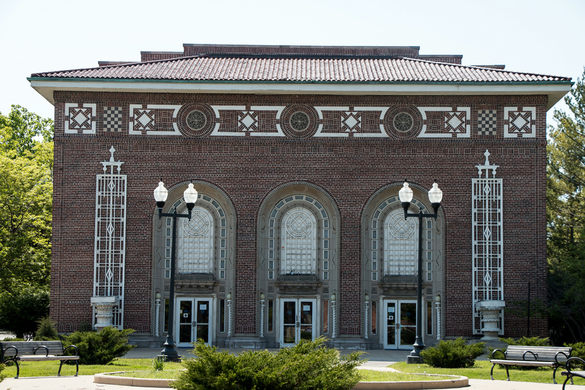

Geography
- Location: Chicago, Illinois, United States
- Coordinates: 41.988024947336235°N 87.7243112262291°W

Organization
- Type: Specialist

Services
- Beds: 950
- Speciality: Sanatorium

History
- Opened: 1915
- Closed: 1970s

Links
- Lists: Hospitals in Illinois
- Chicago Municipal Tuberculosis Sanitarium District
- U.S. National Register of Historic Places
- U.S. Historic district
- Location within Illinois
- Location: 5601-6000 N. Pulaski Rd., Chicago, Illinois
- Area: 33.7 acres (13.6 ha)
- NRHP reference No.: 100003913
- Added to NRHP: September 26, 2019
- yes

The Chicago Municipal Tuberculosis Sanitarium was located in Chicago, Illinois, US. Founded in 1915, it was a municipal organization which included a sanatorium, dispensaries, and other auxiliary agencies essential in the control of tuberculosis. The sanitarium was the largest municipal sanitarium in the country and had a capacity of 950 beds.

== History ==
In 1911, the city of Chicago bought 158 acres (64 ha) to establish the sanitarium in what is now the North Park Village Nature Center. It operated from 1915 through the 1970s. Dr. Theodore B. Sachs was its first president. Dr. J. Robert Thompson served as chief of laboratories from 1945 to 1970.

By the 1950s and 1960s, the incidence of tuberculosis was drastically reduced through improved public hygiene, vaccines and antimicrobial drugs. When the sanitarium became underused by the 1970s, the city of Chicago decided to redevelop the property as North Park Village, to include senior citizen housing, a school for the developmentally disabled, a nature preserve, and parkland. In 1977, the Chicago Park District began leasing and re-developing the site.

The sanitarium site was listed on the National Register of Historic Places in 2019.

== Geography ==
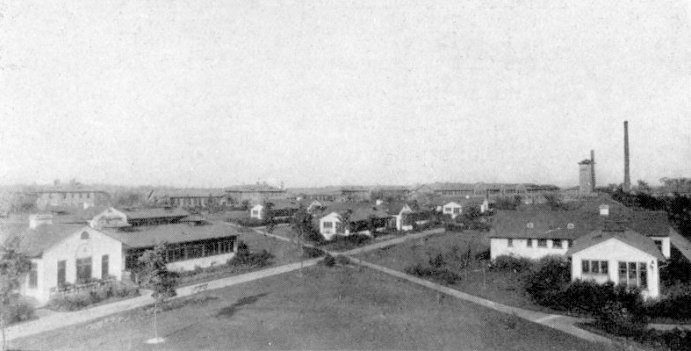
Sanitarium buildings at North Crawford and Bryn Mawr Avenues, viewed from the southwest, in 1922

It occupied a 0.5 miles (0.80 km) square in the extreme northwest section of the city, at the corner of North Pulaski Road (formerly Crawford Avenue) and Bryn Mawr Avenue. There was a special service entrance at Peterson Avenue. The work of improving the grounds was done under the direction of O. C. Simonds & Company, Landscape Gardeners. A broad stretch of ground was reserved for farming and gardening.

The grounds were divided into two sections: the south section reserved for the cottages for ambulant women patients; the north section, for men. East of the Administration building were the dining halls, one for men patients and another for women patients. Nearby were a group of Infirmary buildings with a capacity of about 300 beds. The power house and laundry building were at the extreme eastern point. The "Open Air Cottages" for ambulant men and women patients formed two separate groups of buildings. Of the initial 28 cottages, 20 were for adults and 8 for children with the total capacity of about 380 beds. An additional 12 cottages were added at a later time, increasing the number of beds for ambulant cases to 650. The Nurses' Building, the garage, farmhouse and barns were located elsewhere on the grounds. In 1923, landscape architect Jens Jensen designed a children's campground and pool in the sanitarium's northwestern corner, planned as a natural garden with rock outcroppings, cascading water, and a spring-fed pool.
