= H37Rv =

Bacterial strain

Mycobacterium tuberculosis strain H37Rv is the most studied strain of tuberculosis in research laboratories. It was first isolated by Dr. Edward R. Baldwin in 1905. The strain came from a 19-year-old patient with chronic pulmonary tuberculosis at the Trudeau Sanatorium in Saranac Lake, New York. It was maintained for many years by serial passage of cultures at the Trudeau Sanatorium and initially named strain H37. Over time it was found to have variable virulence in animal models based on which medium it was grown on. Strains with different virulence were then intentionally produced, with H37R being less virulent after growing in acidic media and H37S was more virulent in guinea pigs after being grown in alkaline media (with R standing for resistant to environment, and S for sensitive to environment). The more virulent strain was later renamed H37Rv, with R standing for rough morphology and v standing for virulent. The strain was used for many laboratory studies and became the standard for tuberculosis. It was later designated as the neotype for the species.

Koch first discovered mycobacterium tuberculosis as the cause of tuberculosis in 1882 but the strains he studied were not preserved and it is unclear how related H37Rv may be to those strains. H37Rv has continued to be the strain of tuberculosis most used in laboratories, and was the first to have its complete genome published in 1998. It is unclear how much H37Rv may have evolved in more than 100 years under artificial conditions in laboratories from strains in the wild, but its genome is similar to a strain isolated from a 19th-century grave in Yorkshire. However it does not have some characteristics, such as causing caseous necrosis in rabbits, that are seen in modern clinical isolates. Strains in different labs that derive from H37Rv have also been shown to have evolved differences over time, with one survey of 6 strains finding from 5 to 10 polymorphisms per strain. These included independent insertions and deletions of IS6110 transposable elements which would change the strain's spoligotype. The authors of the study cautioned against considering all strains labeled as H37Rv as a reference since there may be significant differences based on the laboratory in which it is maintained.
