= David Marine =

American pathologist

- Born: September 20, 1880
- Died: November 6, 1976 (aged 96)
- Known for: treatment of goiter with iodine
- Awards: 1960, Kober Medal
- Scientific career
- Fields: pathology

David Marine (20 September 1880 – 6 November 1976) was an American pathologist. He is remembered for his trial, with O. P. Kimball as his assistant, of the effect of giving iodide to a large group of schoolgirls in Akron, Ohio from 1917 to 1922, which greatly reduced their development of goiter, and resulted in the iodization of table salt.
