= Jane F. Desforges =

American hematologist

Jane F. Desforges (1921 – September 7, 2013) was an American hematologist and professor at Tufts University School of Medicine.

== Biography ==
Desforges was born in 1921 in Melrose, Massachusetts, where she attended Melrose High School. Although her father was a general practitioner, she initially did not want to pursue a career in medicine; she majored in chemistry at Wellesley College and then followed a friend to enroll at Tufts University School of Medicine. When she graduated in 1945, she was one of five women in a graduating class of 98 men. She met her husband Gerald Desforges (who would later become a thoracic surgeon) at medical school, and married him in 1948.

Desforges worked as a resident at Boston City Hospital before moving to Salt Lake City to complete a fellowship with the hematologist Maxwell Wintrobe. After a year in Salt Lake City, she returned to Boston City Hospital, where she would remain for the next 25 years in a variety of roles including the director of laboratories and physician-in-charge of the Tufts University hematology laboratory. As a hematologist, she specialized sickle cell anemia and Hodgkin lymphoma. She became a professor of medicine at Tufts in 1972, and during her tenure she received the medical school's Outstanding Teacher Award for thirteen years in a row.

She served as an associate editor of the New England Journal of Medicine from 1960 to 1993, was president of the American Society of Hematology, was made a member of the Institute of Medicine (now the National Academy of Medicine), and received the Massachusetts Medical Society's Lifetime Achievement Award in 2001. In 2007, the Jane F. Desforges Distinguished Teacher Award was named in her honor by the American College of Physicians in 2007. She was the first woman to receive the award in 1988.

Desforges retired in 1995 and died on September 7, 2013.
