= Oswald Hope Robertson =

American physician (1886–1966)

- Born: June 2, 1886; Woolwich, London, England
- Died: March 23, 1966 (aged 79); Santa Cruz, California, U.S.
- Education: University of California, Berkeley; Harvard Medical School
- Known for: Pioneer of blood banks (WWI "blood depots")
- Awards: George M. Kober Medal
- Scientific career
- Fields: Medicine, Pathology
- Workplaces: Peking Union Medical College; University of Chicago

Oswald Hope Robertson (2 June 1886 – 23 March 1966) was an English-born medical scientist who pioneered the idea of blood banks in the "blood depots" he established in 1917 during service in France with the US Army Medical Corps.

== Life ==
Robertson was born on 2 June 1886 in Woolwich in south-east London, but at the age of one-and-a-half he emigrated with his parents to California, settling in the San Joaquin Valley. He attended local schools in Dinuba, then graduated from the Polytechnic High School in San Francisco.

His initial plan to study basic biology was changed by a meeting with an American medical student while on holiday in Germany. After attending some lectures on anatomy, he decided to study medicine, being admitted to the University of California in 1906. He later studied at Harvard Medical School, the Massachusetts General Hospital and the Rockefeller Institute for Medical Research, but had to cut short his studies during World War I when he was called to join medical teams in France.

While serving as an officer in the U.S. Army Medical Corps in France, he made his most significant contribution to medical history. Recognizing the critical need to treat shock and hemorrhage closer to the front lines where wounded soldiers were dying before they could reach traditional transfusion stations, Robertson set out to solve the problem of blood storage and transport. In 1917, working with the Expeditionary Force, he established the first experimental "blood depots" (effectively the precursors to modern blood banks). Utilizing modified glass bottles containing a sodium citrate solution to prevent coagulation, Robertson successfully stored blood types for future use and organized a volunteer military donor service, revolutionizing battlefield medicine.

After World War I, he accepted an associate professorship at the Peking Union Medical College in Beijing, China. He became a Full Professor at the institution in 1923. In 1927 he returned to USA, and accepted a position as head of the Department of Medicine at the University of Chicago. He remained at Chicago until retiring to emeritus status in 1951.

After retiring, Robertson moved to California. He died in Santa Cruz on 23 March 1966.

== Commemoration ==
- Robertson Blood Center, Fort Hood, TX

== Bibliography ==
- Biography in Innovators and Pioneers, Red Gold: The Epic Story of Blood on Public Service Broadcasting website, accessed June 7, 2006.
- * "O. H. (Oswald Hope) Robertson Papers". American Philosophical Society.
- Camp, Frank R. (1970). A History of the Army Blood Program (PDF). Washington, D.C.: Office of the Surgeon General, Department of the Army.
