= Wisia Wedzicha =

British physicist

Jadwiga "Wisia" A. Wedzicha
- Education: Somerville College, Oxford
- Awards: Helmholtz International Fellow Award
- Scientific career
- Workplaces: Barts and The London School of Medicine and Dentistry; National Heart and Lung Institute

Jadwiga "Wisia" A. Wedzicha FMedSci is a British physician and Professor of Respiratory Medicine at the National Heart and Lung Institute. Her research has considered the causes and impact of chronic obstructive pulmonary disease. She was elected as Fellow of the UK Academy of Medical Sciences in 2013 and awarded the Helmholtz International Fellow Award.

== Early life and education ==
Wedzicha studied medicine at Somerville College, Oxford. She completed her medical training at Barts and The London School of Medicine and Dentistry.

== Research and career ==
Wedzicha studied chronic obstructive pulmonary disease and the role of infection in COPD exacerbations. Her research identified the significance of airway colonisation and infection in driving immune responses in the lung that contributes to disease progression in COPD. She has investigated clinical management of patients.

Wedzicha has served as Editor-in-Chief of Thorax, the American Journal of Respiratory and Critical Care Medicine and BioMed Central.

== Select publications ==
- Qaseem, Amir; Wilt, Timothy J; Weinberger, Steven E; et al. (2011). "Diagnosis and Management of Stable Chronic Obstructive Pulmonary Disease: A Clinical Practice Guideline Update from the American College of Physicians, American College of Chest Physicians, American Thoracic Society, and European Respiratory Society". Annals of Internal Medicine. 155 (3): 179. doi:10.7326/0003-4819-155-3-201108020-00008. PMID 21810710. Wikidata Q22305324.
- Josephine V Lightowler; Jadwiga A Wedzicha; Mark W Elliott; Felix S F Ram (2003). "Non-invasive positive pressure ventilation to treat respiratory failure resulting from exacerbations of chronic obstructive pulmonary disease: Cochrane systematic review and meta-analysis". The BMJ. 326 (7382): 185. doi:10.1136/bmj.326.7382.185. PMC 140272. PMID 12543832. Wikidata Q34451928.
- Bestall JC; Paul EA; Garrod R; Garnham R; Jones PW; Wedzicha JA (1999). "Usefulness of the Medical Research Council (MRC) dyspnoea scale as a measure of disability in patients with chronic obstructive pulmonary disease". Thorax. 54 (7): 581–586. doi:10.1136/thx.54.7.581. PMC 1745516. PMID 10377201. Wikidata Q35533189.
