= Abner McGehee Harvey =

American physician, researcher, educator and historian

- Born: June 30, 1911; Little Rock, Arkansas
- Died: May 8, 1998 (aged 86); Johns Hopkins Hospital
- Citizenship: United States
- Education: Washington and Lee University (AB); Johns Hopkins University School of Medicine (MD)
- Relatives: Elizabeth Treide (wife)
- Medical career
- Profession: Physician
- Institutions: Johns Hopkins Hospital
- Research: neurophysiology, clinical therepeutics
- Awards: George M. Kober Medal

Abner McGehee Harvey (July 30, 1911 – May 8, 1998) was an American physician, researcher, educator, and historian. He served as a medical officer with the U.S. Army during World War II. From 1946 until 1973, he was chair of medicine at Johns Hopkins Medical School and physician-in-chief at Johns Hopkins Hospital. His areas of research were neurophysiology and clinical therepeutics. After stepping down, he became a historian of clinical science.

== Biography ==
Harvey was born in Little Rock, Arkansas, the son of George S. Harvey and Jenette McGehee. He matriculated to Washington and Lee University, where he was awarded a Bachelor's of Arts in 1930. Harvey studied medicine at the Johns Hopkins University School of Medicine in Baltimore, and received his medical degree in 1934.

Following graduation, he joined the staff of Johns Hopkins Hospital in 1934, first as intern then as resident. In 1937 he left for England on a fellowship at the National Institute for Medical Research, spending two years working in the laboratory of Henry H. Dale. He collaborated with G. Lindor Brown on studies of neuromuscular transmission. Harvey was elected to The Physiological Society at the age of 28, one of the few foreigners to be so accorded. In 1939, he joined Detlev W. Bronk at the Johnson Foundation for Biophysics at the University of Pennsylvania. While there he continued his collaborative work on neuromuscular transmission.

On July 1, 1940, Harvey returned to Johns Hopkins as chief resident of the Osler Medical Clinic. In 1941 he was engaged to Elizabeth Baker Treide, a graduate of Vassar College. They had met when Elizabeth was a third year medical student. The couple were married June 21, 1941, and would have a son and three daughters. Two of the daughters, Jenette and Joan, would go on to practice medicine, while the other two, Elizabeth and George, were awarded Ph.D.'s. The couple moved to Nashville, Tennessee where Harvey joined the faculty of Vanderbilt University's Department of Medicine as a resident. While at Vanderbilt, Harvey researched both the pharmacology and physiology of myasthenia gravis, in partnership with J. L. Lilienthal, Jr.

Following the Japanese attack on Pearl Harbor, in 1942 Harvey was sent to the Pacific theater as part of the U.S. war effort. He served as a Major (later Lt. Col.) with the 118th General Hospital in Australian and New Guinea. His work there focused on peripheral nerve injuries. While in New Guinea, he researched the relation of the drug Atabrine to atypical lichen planus. This drug was being used to treat malaria, but in some cases the patients were developing a skin condition. The work by Harvey and his colleagues was the first to demonstrate a connection between the two.

Harvey returned from the Pacific in 1945, and as an Army officer was assigned to Johns Hopkins hospital where he was to investigate the effects of the organophosphate nerve agents developed by the Germans. In December, at the age of 34, Harvey was named physician in chief at Johns Hopkins hospital, taking over from Warfield T. Longcope. He assumed the chair of medicine at the institution on July 1, 1946. At the age of 34, he was the youngest person appointed to this position, and following the announcement he appeared on the cover of Time magazine.

At Johns Hopkins Hospital, Harvey was the first to develop a research-based school of medicine in the United States. During the 27 years Harvey headed up the hospital, the number of research divisions were expanded from three to eighteen, including the then-unconventional divisions of biomedical engineering, clinical pharmacology and medical genetics. He consulted daily with the resident physician, performed bedside rounds three times a week, and conducted the clinical pathology conference once a week. During March 13–17, 1967, he was the Hugh J. Morgan visiting professor at Vanderbilt. In 1969, former Soviet leader Nikita Khrushchev invited Harvey to the Soviet Union to examine his daughter, who had systemic lupus erythematosus. Harvey stepped down from his position at Johns Hopkins in 1973, and was succeeded by Victor A. McKusick.

Harvey spend the remainder of his life on the history of clinical science, publishing several books on the subject. He had a stroke then died at Johns Hopkins Hospital on May 8, 1998.

== Awards and honors ==
Dr. Harvey received the following accolades:

- 1949, honorary D.Sc. from Washington and Lee University
- 1951, honorary D.Sc. from University of Arkansas
- 1975, elected to the American Academy of Arts and Sciences
- 1975, elected president of the American Osler Society
- 1976, honorary D.Sc. from Medican College of Ohio
- 1977, American College of Physicians Distinguished Teacher Award
- 1981, George M. Kober Medal
- 1984, elected to the American Philosophical Society
- 1985, elected Fellow of the Royal College of Physicians

The A. McGehee Harvey Research Award is granted to postdoctoral fellows at the Johns Hopkins University School of Medicine. The A. McGehee Harvey Teaching Tower is part of the Johns Hopkins campus.

== Bibliography ==
His published works include:

- Grob, David; Harvey, A. M. (January 1953), "The effects and treatment of nerve gas poisoning", The American Journal of Medicine, 14 (1): 52–63, doi:10.1016/0002-9343(53)90358-1, PMID 13016586.
- Osler, W.; Harvey, A. M.; McKusick, V. A. (1967), Osler's Textbook Revisited, Johns Hopkins University Press.
- Harvey, A. M. (1968), The Principles and Practice of Medicine, Appleton-Century-Crofts.
- Harvey, A. M. (1971), "Myasthenia gravis—the first 100 years in perspective", Transactions of the American Clinical and Climatological Association, 82: 149–169, PMC 2441052, PMID 4934016.
- Harvey, A. M. (1976), Adventures in Medical Research: A Century of Discovery at Johns Hopkins, Johns Hopkins University Press, ISBN 978-0-8357-9259-2.
- Bordley, J.; Harvey, A. M. (1976), Two centuries of American medicine, 1776-1976.
- Harvey, A. M. (1979), Differential diagnosis : the interpretation of clinical evidence, Saunders, ISBN 978-0-7216-4562-9.
- Harvey, A. M. (1980), The Practice of Medicine: A Self-assessment Guide, Appleton-Century Crofts, ISBN 978-0-8385-7877-3.
- Harvey, A. M. (1981), Science at the Bedside: Clinical Research in American Medicine 1905-1945, Johns Hopkins University Press, ISBN 978-0-8018-2562-0.
- Harvey, A. M. (1981), Research and Discovery in Medicine: Contributions from Johns Hopkins, Johns Hopkins University Press, ISBN 978-0-8018-2723-5.
- Harvey, A. M. (1982), "Orthopaedic Surgery at Johns Hopkins: A Heritage of Excellence in Clinical Practice, Training and Research", The Johns Hopkins Medical Journal, 150 (6): 221–245, PMID 7045488.
- Harvey, A. M. (1989), A Model of Its Kind: A centennial history of medicine at Johns Hopkins, Johns Hopkins University Press, ISBN 978-0-8018-3794-4.
- Harvey, A. M. (1989), A Model of Its Kind: A pictorial history of medicine at Johns Hopkins, vol. 2, Johns Hopkins University Press, ISBN 978-0-8018-3777-7.
- Harvey, A. M.; McKusick, V. A.; Stobo, J. D. (1990), Osler's Legacy: The Department of Medicine at Johns Hopkins, 1889-1989, Department of Medicine, Johns Hopkins University.
- Harvey, A. M. (1995), The Interurban Clinical Club (1905-1994): A Record of Achievement in Clinical Science, Interurban Clinical Club.
- Harvey, A. M. (1999), The Spirit of Discovery: Notes on a Research Career.
