= Faith Thayer Fitzgerald =

American physician and academic

- Born: September 24, 1943; Boston, Massachusetts
- Died: December 3, 2021 (aged 78)
- Education: BA (1965), UC Santa Barbara; MD (1969), UC San Francisco
- Occupation: Internal medicine
- Medical career
- Institutions: UC Davis School of Medicine

Faith Thayer Fitzgerald (September 24, 1943 – December 3, 2021) was an American physician, medical educator, and public speaker. She was emeritus professor at the UC Davis School of Medicine and was the recipient of multiple teaching awards.

== Biography ==
Her maternal grandparents were members of the Russian aristocracy who fled the country during the Russian Revolution. Her mother immigrated to the United States in the 1930s, where she married an Irishman. Faith was born on September 24, 1943, in Boston, Massachusetts during World War II. Her mother Irene divorced her alcoholic husband, leaving her alone with a son and daughter. Toward the end of the war, her semi-destitute mother moved to Berkeley, California in search of work, and there she was later joined by her parents who emigrated from China. Faith's father sobered up following the divorce, and would follow the family out west. They remained in close contact thereafter. Faith frequently went with her father to attend AA meetings.

By the age of six, Faith had settled on medicine as a career path. She would excel at school work. Fitzgerald was tall compared to her classmates and did well in sports. By the age of sixteen, her family finances were in a poor state so Fitzgerald took a job as a cashier at a local theater. At the age of eighteen, she won a Regent's Scholarship and matriculated to University of California, Santa Barbara. In addition to pre-medical studies, she took many humanities courses including Philosophy, Russian literature, and Baroque Art. After a stint in the college dormatory, Fitzgerald moved to a small cottage in Santa Barbara to focus on her studies. She graduated with a BA in 1965 and was valedictorian for her class.

Fitzgerald's father had died the year before her graduation and her emotionally-distraut mother was hospitalized. Her brother Sean, a graduate at Berkeley, soon joined the Marines. Hence, during her difficult first year at University of California, San Francisco medical school, Fitzgerald was left as the sole caretaker for her mother. A year later, her mother had recovered and was able to return to work. In her third year, Fitzgerald met Dr. Hibbard Williams, whose example would strongly influence her to become an internist. The two would remain connected for the remainder of their careers. Fitzgerald completed her M.D. degree in 1969. She remained at San Francisco General Hospital where she completed her residency, becoming board certified in internal medicine in 1973. She then worked as instructor of medicine.

In 1978, Fitzgerald joined the faculty of the University of Michigan as assistant professor of medicine, where remained for two years. In 1980, Hibbard Williams became dean of the UC Davis school of medicine, and he recruited Fitzgerald to become associate dean and a member of the facility. She would remain at UC Davis for the next 38 years. For 20 of those years, she served as chief of the residency program. She also would become chief of general medicine, vice chair for education, and first associate dean for humanities and bioethics at the School of Medicine. Fitzgerald spent time as visiting professor in thirty states and ten countries.

Starting in 1995, Fitzgerald lived with her aging mother and was her caretaker. Irene passed in 2005. Fitzgerald served as governor for the Northern California Chapter of the American College of Physicians (ACP) from 1997 to 2001. From 2006 until 2012, she served as regent for the ACP. She was named emeritus professor at UC Davis, then retired in October, 2019.

== Awards and honors ==
Fitzgerald has received the following accolades:

- 1996, Jane F. Desforges Distinguished Teacher Award
- 1996, Distinguished Alumni Award, UC Santa Barbara
- 2002, Robert J. Glaser Award, Alpha Omega Alpha

She was chosen as the UC Davis Senior Class Outstanding Clinical Teacher seven times, and selected Distinguished Faculty Teacher for the Department of Medicine four times. In 2023, the American College of Physicians named their award for Outstanding Educator of Residents and Fellows after Fitzgerald.
