= Reynolds syndrome =

- Other names: Primary biliary cirrhosis and systemic scleroderma
- This condition is inherited in an autosomal dominant manner

Reynolds syndrome is a rare secondary laminopathy, consisting of the combination of primary biliary cirrhosis and progressive systemic sclerosis. In some patients this syndrome has also been associated with Sjögren's syndrome and hemolytic anemia. Typical clinical features include jaundice, elevated blood levels of alkaline phosphatase, calcinosis cutis, telangiectasias, and pruritus. This disease may cause white or yellow-ish spots on the arms or legs. The syndrome, a special case of scleroderma, is named after the American physician, Telfer B. Reynolds, MD (1921–2004), who first described it. He is also known for creating one of the world's first hepatology programs at the University of Southern California.

It should not be confused with the more common Raynaud's phenomenon.
