= Theodore B. Sachs =

American physician

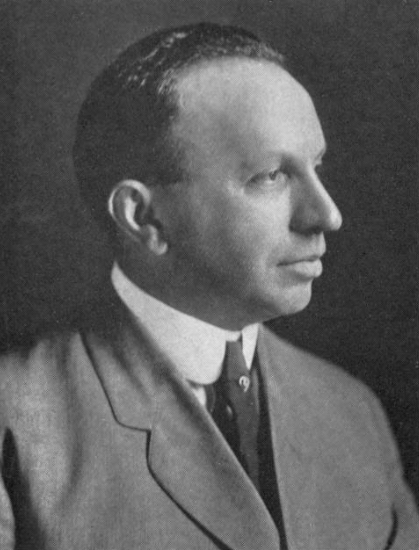
Portrait of Theodore Bernard Sachs (1868–1916) from History of Medicine and Surgery, and Physicians and Surgeons of Chicago, 1922, page 180

Theodore Bernard Sachs (May 2, 1868 – April 2, 1916) was an American physician and lawyer. He was elected president of the National Tuberculosis Association at the Eleventh Annual Meeting held in Seattle, Washington, in June, 1915. But his death on April 2, 1916 prevented his serving his full term. He had already served the Association as vice-president from 1913 to 1914.

== Early life and education ==
Theodore Bernard Sachs was born in Dinaberg, Russian Empire, May 2, 1868. His parents were Bernard and Sophie Sachs. He graduated from Kherson High School. In 1891, he received his degree in law from the Odessa University. While at the university, he reported for military duty and was placed on the reserve list in 1887. His removal to the U.S. in 1891 was doubtless prompted by a winter's exile, imposed upon him and several fellow-students because of their participation in a debate which did not meet with the approval of the local authorities.

After his arrival in the U.S., Sachs determined to study medicine, and gave up his legal career to enter the University of Illinois College of Medicine, from which he graduated in 1895. After two years of work as an intern in the Michael Reese Hospital, he entered general practice, devoting himself particularly to diseases of the lungs.

== Career ==
In 1901, Sachs was appointed instructor in internal medicine at his alma mater, and in 1903 he was appointed attending physician to Cook County Hospital. Even in the earlier days of his medical career, as a struggling young practitioner endeavoring to gain a foothold, he saw how conditions were with reference to tuberculosis in Chicago at that time, and he could not refrain from doing something to help. At no little sacrifice and expense, he personally made an investigation of the prevalence of tuberculosis in some of the crowded quarters of the city, particularly in the districts where the Jewish population was in evidence. These studies, among the first of their kind, gave Sachs considerable prominence at the Sixth International Congress on Tuberculosis in 1908, and won for him special honorable mention from the jury of awards.

Sachs was greatly interested in the Chicago Tuberculosis Institute, which he helped to call into life, and of which he remained one of the most active and representative workers. He served as president of the Institute from January 1913, until his death. In the early morning of April 2, 1916, he committed suicide by taking an overdose of morphine because "I am simply weary. I cannot bear this longer. It has been too much."

He was one of the most ardent advocates of the routine examinations of employees of large establishments. It was largely due to Sachs' influence that Mrs. Keith Spalding donated the funds for the Edward Sanatorium at Naperville, of which institution he became the director and physician in chief. Besides his activities in the Edward Sanatorium, he was attached to the Chicago Winfield Sanatorium, the West Side Dispensary, and the Chicago Municipal Tuberculosis Sanitarium.

In the spring of 1915, a new administration came into office in the city of Chicago, which, it was universally admitted at the time, was responsible for Sachs' untimely death. He had made the Chicago Municipal Sanitarium an ideal institution, but the Thompson administration refused to reappoint him until practically forced to do so by the people of Chicago. Politics finally gained the upper hand, however, and Sachs was forced to resign; but even after his resignation, politics made life a burden for this pioneer who had devoted the best years of his life to the welfare of the consumptive poor of the great city of Chicago.

His achievements as a clinician and specialist in tuberculosis are equal to his attainments as a propagandist and administrator. He founded the Robert Koch Society for the Study of Tuberculosis, and read before that body a number of interesting and valuable papers on the various phases of tuberculosis science. A few months before his death (February, 1916) he was elected a fellow of the Institute of Medicine in Chicago. He also resigned from the Municipal Sanitarium Board.

He died at the Naperville library. The body of Sachs was interred on the grounds of the Naperville Sanatorium, and on the memorial tablet indicating the site, is the following inscription:

In Memory of DR. THEODORE B. SACHS, whose life was spent in disinterested efforts to relieve the condition of the unfortunate, never indifferent to the distress of others, he labored unselfishly and untiringly in their behalf, and this Sanatorium in which ground he sleeps is a monument to his unusual greatness of heart and singleness of purpose. He loved his neighbor as himself and was in truth a good Samaritan.

Over the portals of that other monument to Sachs' genius, the Chicago Municipal Tuberculosis Sanitarium, which had become a part of his very life, is the following inscription: "Conceived in boundless love of humanity and made possible by years of toil."
