= American Journal of Respiratory and Critical Care Medicine =

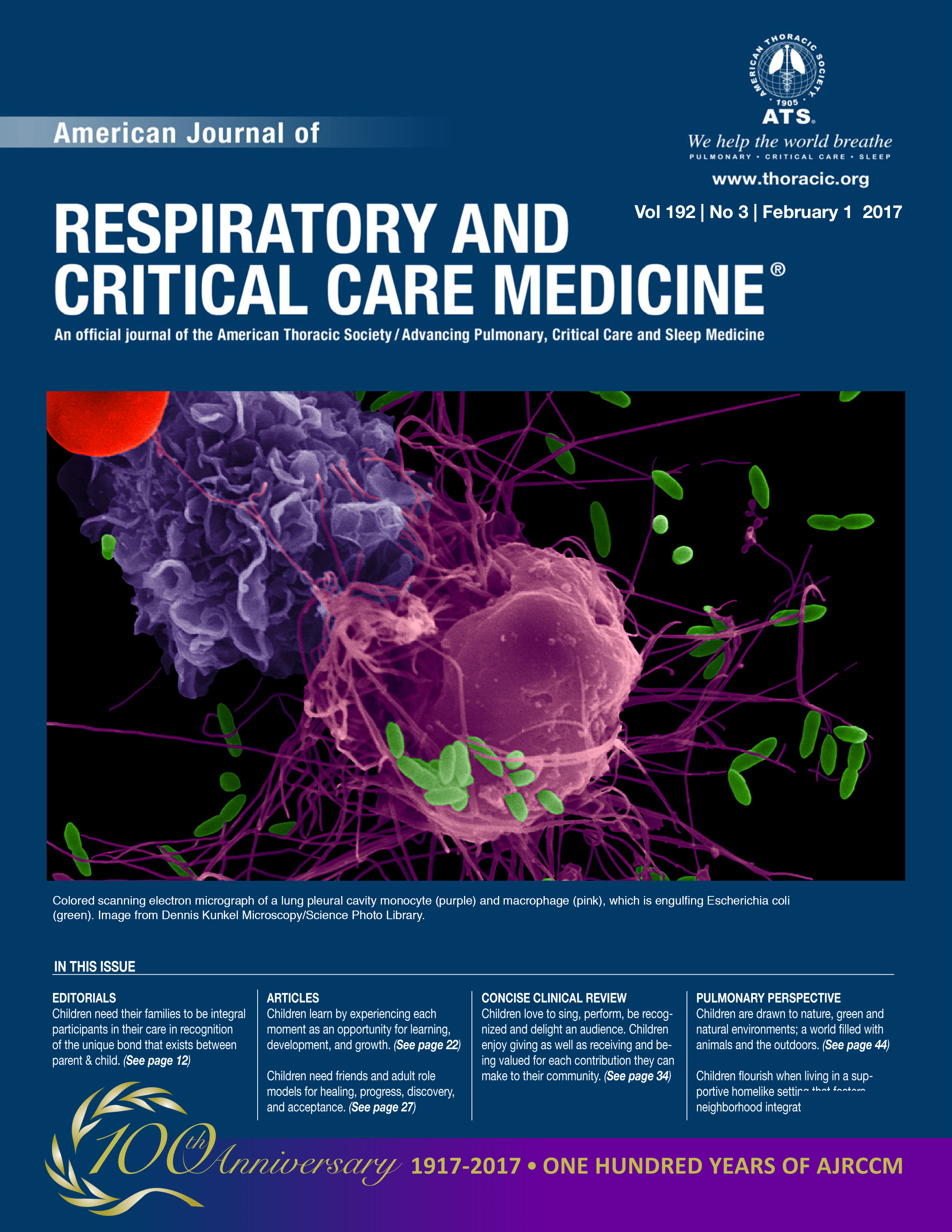
- Discipline: Pulmonology
- Language: English
- Edited by: Fernando J. Martinez

Publication details
- Former names: American Review of Tuberculosis, American Review of Respiratory Diseases, American Review of Respiratory Disease
- History: 1917–present
- Publisher: American Thoracic Society (United States)
- Frequency: Monthly
- Impact factor: 19.4 (2024)

Standard abbreviations
- ISO 4: Am. J. Respir. Crit. Care Med.

Indexing
- CODEN: AJCMED
- ISSN: 1073-449X (print); 1535-4970 (web)
- LCCN: sn93003167
- OCLC no.: 29407978

Links
- Journal homepage; Online access; Online archive

The American Journal of Respiratory and Critical Care Medicine is a monthly, peer-reviewed medical journal published by the American Thoracic Society. It covers the pathophysiology and treatment of diseases that affect the respiratory system, as well as topics of fundamental importance to the practice of pulmonary, critical care, and sleep medicine. It was established in March 1917 as the American Review of Tuberculosis. Since then there have been several title changes. In 1953 a subtitle was added, "A Journal of Pulmonary Diseases." In 1955 the title became the American Review of Tuberculosis and Pulmonary Diseases, and in 1959 the American Review of Respiratory Diseases (the final "s" was dropped in 1966). The journal obtained its current title in 1994.

The journal was established by the National Tuberculosis Association, which became the American Lung Association, and which published the journal from 1917 until 1994 when its medical section, the American Thoracic Society, became the publisher.

== Editors ==
The following persons are or have been editor-in-chief of the journal:

- Edward R. Baldwin (1917-1922)
- Allen K. Krause (1922-1939)
- Max Pinner (1940-1947)
- Esmond R. Long (1948-1951)
- Walsh McDermott (1952-1972)
- Daniel S. Lucas (Acting, January–June 1973)
- John F. Murray (1973-1979)
- Gareth M. Green (1980-1984)
- Reuben M. Cherniack (1985-1989)
- Robert A. Klocke (1989-1994)
- Alan R. Leff (1994-1999)
- Martin J. Tobin (1999-2004)
- Edward Abraham (2004-2009)
- Jacob Iasha Sznajder (2010-2014)
- Jadwiga A. Wedzicha (Imperial College London) (2015-2021)
- Fernando J. Martinez ( UMass Chan Medical School) (2022-present)

== Abstracting and indexing ==
The journal is abstracted and indexed in:

- Academic OneFile
- Academic Search
- BIOSIS Previews
- CAB Abstracts
- Cambridge Scientific Abstracts
- Chemical Abstracts
- CINAHL
- Current Contents/Critical Care Medicine
- Current Contents/Life Sciences
- Elsevier BIOBASE
- Embase
- Global Health
- Index Medicus/MEDLINE/PubMed
- Science Citation Index Expanded
- Scopus
- Tropical Diseases Bulletin

According to the Journal Citation Reports, the journal has a 2024 impact factor of 19.4, ranking it 2nd out of 36 journals in the category "Critical Care Medicine" and 2nd out of 64 journals in the category "Respiratory System".
