= Bennett Lorber =

American professor of medicine

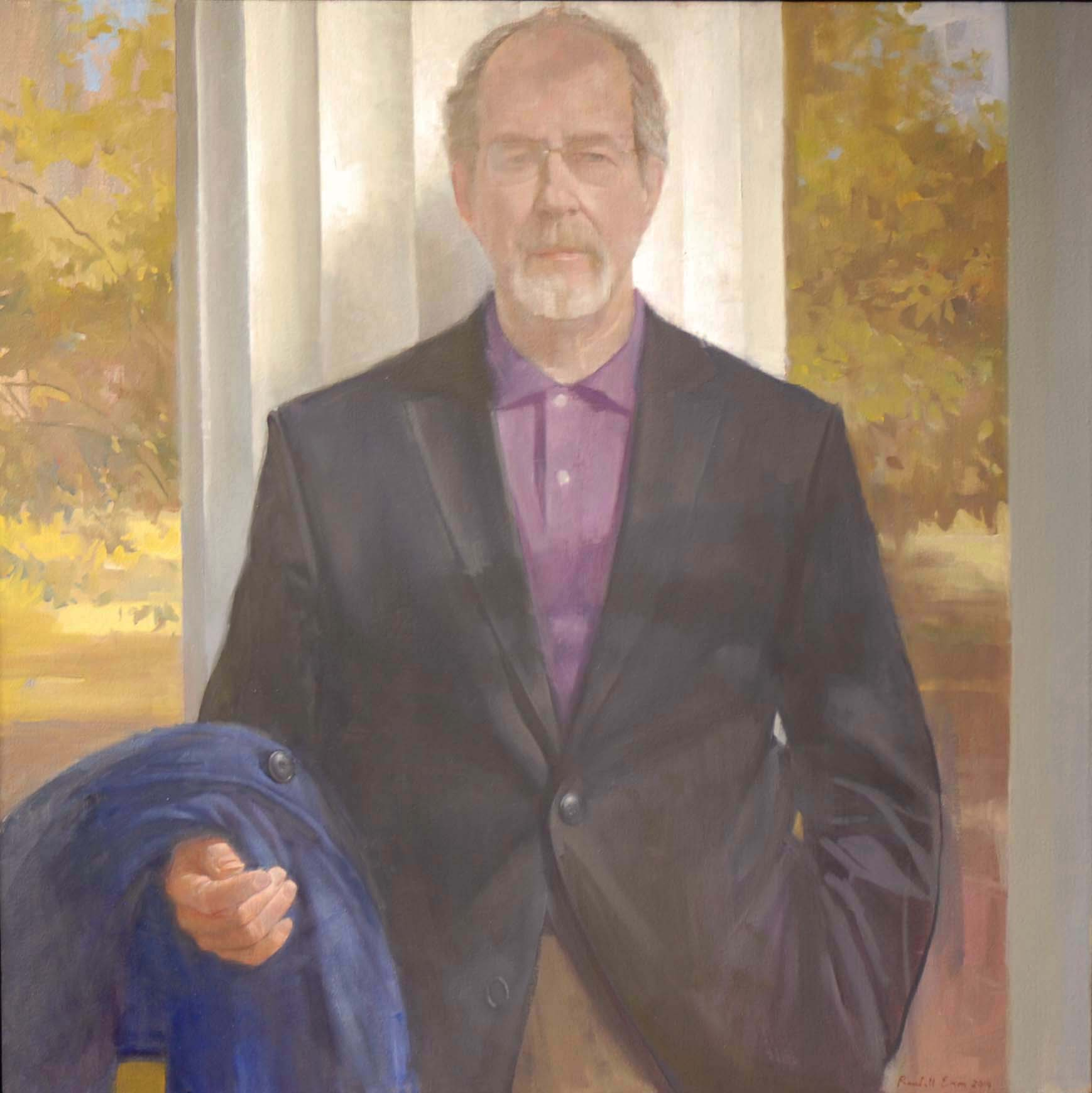
- Portrait of Bennett Lorber by Randall Exon, 2014
- Born: April 1, 1943 (age 82); Philadelphia, Pennsylvania, United States
- Education: Swarthmore College (BA), Perelman School of Medicine, University of Pennsylvania (MD)
- Known for: Medical educator

Bennett Lorber is an American medical educator. In 2018 he became professor emeritus at the Lewis Katz School of Medicine at Temple University. An authority on the listeriosis bacterial infection in humans, he has been recognized for the quality of his clinical teaching and has received distinguished teacher awards from the Association of American Medical Colleges (2018) and the American College of Physicians (2013). He also received a lifetime achievement award from the Infectious Diseases Society of America (2003). He was president of the College of Physicians of Philadelphia between 2010 and 2012 and of the Anaerobe Society of the Americas between 2008 and 2010.

== Education ==
Lorber attended Swarthmore College where he majored in zoology and art history and graduated with a Bachelor of Arts degree in 1964. He then attended the Perelman School of Medicine at the University of Pennsylvania and graduated as doctor of medicine in 1968. He served an internship (1968–69) and residency in internal medicine (1969–71) and was a Fellow in Infectious Diseases (1971–1973) at Temple University Hospital.

== Career ==
In 1973 Lorber joined the faculty of the Temple University School of Medicine. (Note: In 2015 the Temple University School of Medicine was renamed the Lewis Katz School of Medicine at Temple University.) He was appointed professor of medicine in 1983 and from 1983 to 2006 served as chief of the school's Section of Infectious Diseases. In 1988 he was named the first recipient of the Thomas Durant Chair in Medicine, a position he held concurrently with that of professor of microbiology and immunology.

Lorber has written more than 140 professional articles, a significant number of which have been cited more than 100 times in professional literature. Lorber's article asking "are all diseases infectious?" has been frequently cited and continues to be referenced more than 20 years after its publication. The article appeared in the Annals of Internal Medicine in November 1996. In 2003, an article of Lorber's was described as a classic in a profile of him appearing in Temple Medicine. Lorber has contributed to every edition of Principles and Practice of Infectious Diseases. He was president of the College of Physicians of Philadelphia between 2010 and 2012 and of the Anaerobe Society of the Americas between 2008 and 2010.

=== Clinical work, hospital positions, and research interests ===
Lorber is an authority on listeriosis and anaerobic infections and has studied the impact of societal changes on infectious disease patterns and the relationship between infectious agents and chronic illness. He was an attending staff physician at Temple University Hospital and Chief of the Section of Infectious Diseases. He has been a consultant in infectious diseases at the Fox Chase Cancer Center in Philadelphia, the Germantown Hospital and Dispensary, the Philadelphia Geriatric Center, and the Jeanes Hospital, Philadelphia.

=== Awards and honors ===
During his teaching career Lorber received thirteen Golden Apple awards, conferred by the Temple chapter of the American Medical Student Association for a teacher's outstanding dedication, ability and zeal. On two occasions the graduating class at Temple dedicated its yearbook to him (1975, 1988). In 1978 he received Temple's Lindback award for distinguished teaching. He is the only two-time recipient of the Russell and Pearl Moses award for excellence in clinical teaching at Temple (1985, 1990). He received Temple's Great Teacher Award in 1991.

In 2004, Lorber was elected to the Academy of Distinguished Educators in Medicine and in 2005 the alumni association of the Temple University School of Medicine presented him with its Honored Professor Award. In 2012 he was named outstanding senior educator by Temple's department of medicine. In 2013 the American College of Physicians presented Lorber with its distinguished teaching award. In 2018 the Association of American Medical Colleges gave him its Distinguished Teacher Award.

Lorber received the Alexander Fleming Lifetime Achievement Award from the Infectious Diseases Society of America (2003) granted "in recognition of a career that reflects major contributions to the acquisition and dissemination of knowledge about infectious diseases." In 2003 he received the Clinical Practice Award of the Pennsylvania Chapter of the American College of Physicians. In 2016 he received a Lifetime Achievement Award from the Anaerobe Society of the Americas at their biennial meeting held in Nashville.

Lorber was given an honorary doctorate of science by Swarthmore College in 1996.

== Personal life ==
Lorber is a professional artist. In an article published in 2015 he wrote that the visual intelligence required of an artist was useful in clinical work, especially in solving diagnostic challenges.
