= Fame House =

Marketing and e-commerce agency

- Company type: Subsidiary of Universal Music Group
- Industry: Marketing
- Founded: 2011; 14 years ago
- Founder: Michael Fiebach
- Headquarters: Philadelphia, Pennsylvania, United States
- Website: famehouse.net

Fame House is a Philadelphia-based digital marketing and e-commerce agency, with satellite offices in Los Angeles and New York City, that specializes in direct-to-consumer services for the music and entertainment industries, focused on building, marketing, managing, and monetizing its clients' online presence. Founded by Michael Fiebach in 2011 following years working for DJ Shadow, the company was acquired by SFX Entertainment in 2013 for an undisclosed sum, and is the first company to monetize music through BitTorrent (as a result of which, Music Ally named it one of the Top 40 Music Industry Disruptors for 2013). In 2015, Philadelphia (magazine) named Fame House one of Philly's 20 Coolest Companies.

On May 27, 2016, Universal Music Group announced that it had acquired Fame House from SFX Entertainment, following SFX's filing for Chapter 11. UMG announced that Mike Fiebach would remain as CEO, and Eric Hahn would become the Chief Strategy and Marketing Officer, and that they would report into Boyd Muir, UMG's Executive Vice President and CFO, and Michele Anthony, Executive Vice President.

According to Fame House, they claim to have begun with clients such as DJ Shadow, and Pretty Lights, and further claim to have worked with artists such as Eminem.

Eminem's manager, Paul Rosenberg, refers to Fame House as a "nimble, cutting-edge company to support our online marketing, social media, and merchandising endeavors."

Following the acquisition of Fame House by UMG, the company has continued to expand, including work with Justin Bieber's e-commerce operation. Philly.com wrote an article following the acquisition, exploring Fame House's place in the expanding Philly music and startup scene.

Eric Hahn, the CMO of Fame House, was named as Drexel University's Young Alumni Entrepreneur Award in 2015 for his work with Fame House.

In 2016, Fame House was chosen as a Philadelphia Future 50 company by SmartCEO Magazine. These awards are given to the fastest-growing mid-sized companies in the region.
