= Carl W. Walter =

American physician (1905–1992)

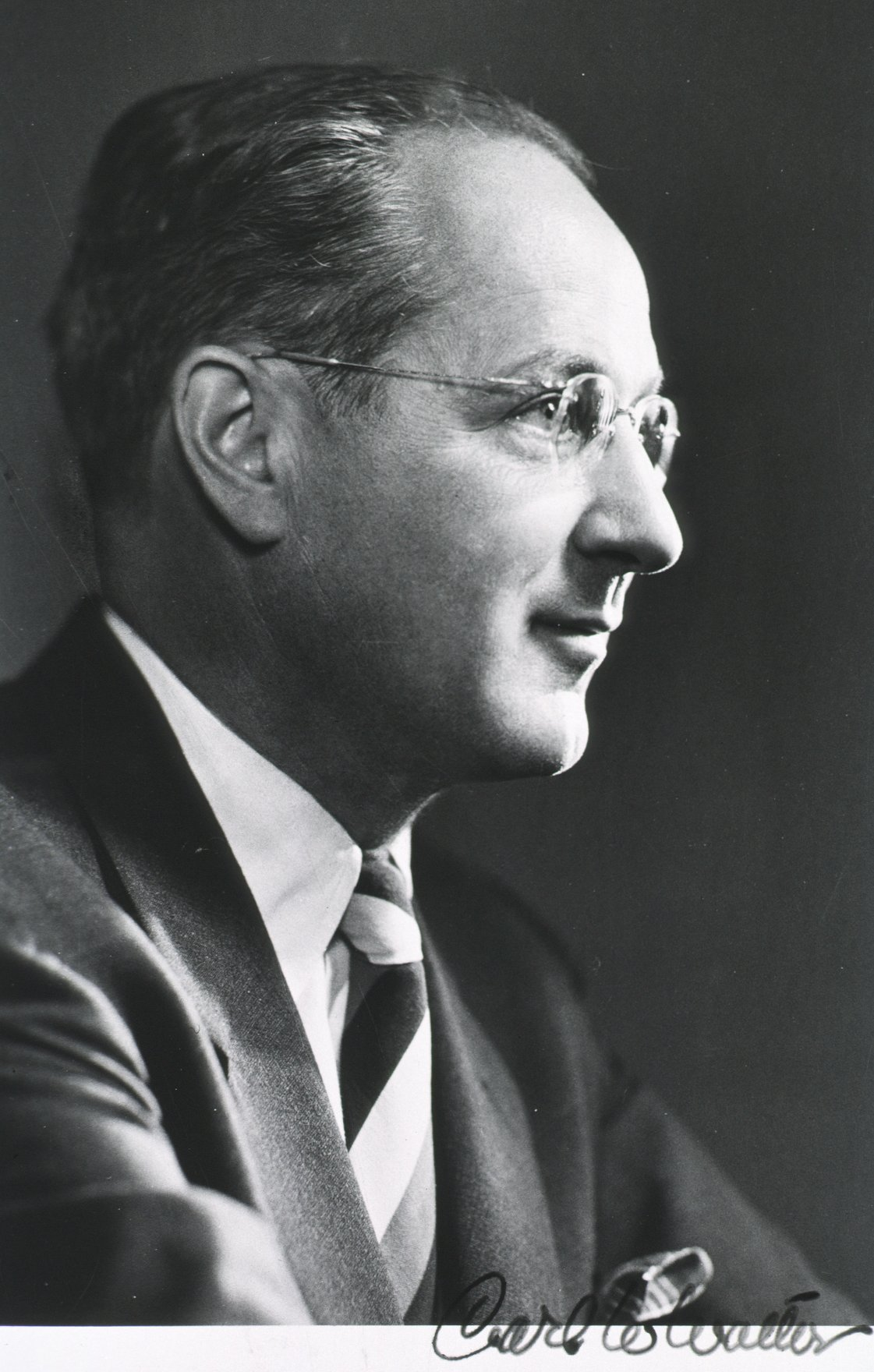
- Portrait of Carl W. Walter
- Born: 1905; Cleveland, Ohio
- Died: 1992 (aged 86–87); Cambridge, Massachusetts
- Education: Harvard College; Harvard Medical School
- Medical career
- Profession: Surgeon

Carl Waldemar Walter (1905 – May 5, 1992) was a surgeon, inventor, and professor at Harvard Medical School. Walter has been called "a pioneer in the transfusion and storage of blood," credited with founding one of the world's first blood banks and invention of the first blood collection bag. He was also known for his prolific work in the advocacy, application, and study of asepsis.

== Career ==
From 1937 to 1972, Walter was the Clinical Professor of Surgery at Harvard Medical School.
