= Ballistocardiography =

- MeSH: D001450
- HCPCS-L2: S3902

Ballistocardiography (BCG) is the measurement of ballistic forces generated by the heart. The downward movement of blood through the descending aorta produces an upward recoil, moving the body upward with each heartbeat. As different parts of the aorta expand and contract, the body continues to move downward and upward in a repeating pattern. Ballistocardiography is a technique for producing a graphical representation of repetitive motions of the human body arising from the sudden ejection of blood into the great vessels with each heart beat. It is a vital sign in the 1–20 Hz frequency range which is caused by the mechanical movement of the heart and can be recorded by noninvasive methods from the surface of the body. It was shown for the first time, after extensive research work by Isaac Starr, that the effect of main heart malfunctions can be identified by observing and analyzing the BCG signal. Recent work also validates BCG could be monitored using camera in a non-contact manner.

One example of the use of a BCG is a ballistocardiographic scale, which measures the recoil of the person's body who is on the scale. A BCG scale is able to show a person's heart rate as well as their weight.

The term ballistocardiograph originated from the Roman ballista, which is derived from the Greek word ballein (to throw), a machine for launching missiles, plus the Greek words for heart and writing.

== See also ==
- Advanced cardiac life support (ACLS)
- Cardiac arrest
- Cardiac cycle
- EKG tech
- Cardiac monitoring
- Heart rate monitor
- Holter monitor
- SCP-ECG
