= Johan Lorbeer =

German artist

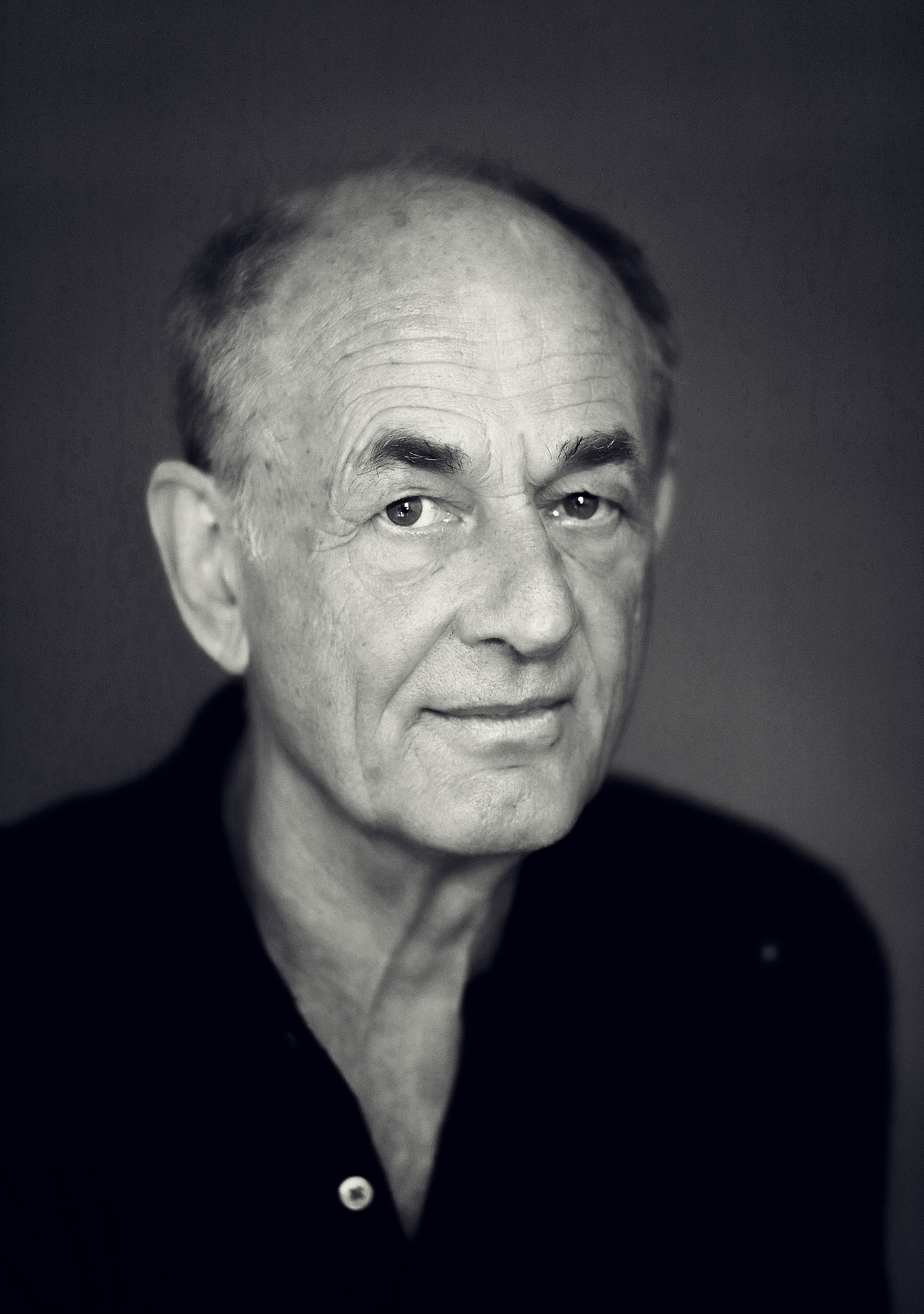
- Born: June 11, 1950 (age 75); Bückeburg, Germany
- Notable work: 1995, "Working Class Hero" 2002; "Tarzan (Standing Leg)"
- Style: Super-Slow Performance. Monochrome Field Painting
- Awards: Karl-Hofer Prize, 1996, Hdk Best Art Book, 2011, International Book Fair, Frankfurt, Germany
- Website: johanlorbeer.com

Johan Lorbeer is a German artist and illusionist concerned with phenomena of perception. He best known for levitating in the air, with an arm touching the surface of a building.

== Vita ==
Johan Lorbeer (* 11 June 1950 in Bückeburg ) is a German artist, based in Berlin since 1985. His artistic work oscillates between monochrome painting and super-slow

performance. In 1996, he received the Karl-Hofer Prize of the “Hochschule der Künste” (HdK), Berlin for his performance "Rothko-Fax". In 2011, his publication "Geschäftsbericht" was awarded as best art book at the International Book Fair held in Frankfurt. He taught as a professor at the University of the Arts (UdK) in Berlin from 2000 to 2015.

== Work ==
Lorbeer’s work is composed of 2 prominent genres – Monochrome field painting and Super-Slow performance. Poised between image and performance, Johan Lorbeer is different from other contemporary artists of his kind. Due to the artist's colour blindness, the phenomena of colour plays a major role in his work, which is equally concerned with both sculptural and performance aspects. There are many historical style links with Modern art, with Constructive-Concrete as well as with Concept Art and Monochrome painting . The two principal elements of his work, sometimes mutually and self-reflexive, are also lined with elements of humour, anarchy and subversive critique.

In the last years, Johan Lorbeer became internationally known for pioneering super slow anti-gravity performances.

=== Super-slow/still-life performances ===
Characteristic of Lorbeer's super-slow/still-life performances is the physically inexplicable spatial presence of the artist, which causes the viewer to reflect on his own point of view.

The situations he creates in them straddle the borderline between image and performance and are fascinating because of their apparent incompatibility with our spatial visual experiences. In 1987, he created his first work in a series of still life performances with the title : “Dedicated to my Mother", with 26 porcelain plates, and further works “Working class Hero” 1995 and “Tarzan/Standing Leg" (2002). He describes an artistic act, the working language of different types of visual art such as sculpture, installation, and dramatic body gesture. At the center of this creative effort are spatial-temporal gaps, interruptions, transitions, and inversions. Through the fixation of his own body in a highly unusual place and condition in time and space, the artist is striving to express its fluidity in a physical way. His performances have a duration of 2–3 hours.

=== Monochrome painting ===
The identification of colours, caused by the partial colour blindness of the artist, is the basic motif for his examination of the phenomenon of colour. He uses the colour in its various expressions such as: industrial colour films, fresco pigments, children's crayons, Chinese ink, as well as colour tones that Lorbeer extracts from vegetable juices. His monochrome works were only exhibited a few times, for instance at the Laden für Nichts, Berlin 1989, and the Pallazzo del Espositione, Rome 1992.

In 1985, Lorbeer created a series of temporary colour works illegally in different Berlin subway stations. There, the artist covered large underground areas in multicoloured adhesive foils on top of the under paths beneath the tracks and along the walls.

His interaction between colour-works and performance is best seen in his performance Rothko Fax which was presented in 1991 at the Künstlerhaus Bethanien. In this performance, Lorbeer stands in 2 buckets of liquid emulsion paint, holding 2 dry coloured bath terry towels, resembling and honouring Mark Rothko’s Colour Field Painting, in an extremely unstable body position.

Since 2002, he has developed a series of monochrome wing paintings, which are worked on both the front and back to utilize the material to its fullest potential. These wing paintings are attached to the walls with hinges and can be swung and opened in different directions. This creates permanently changing colour spatial compositions that can be independently choreographed by the viewers.

=== Selected performances/exhibitions ===
- 1987 Cafe Swing, Berlin West
- 1988 KH Bethanien, Berlin West
- 1988 Galerie Deloch, Berlin DDR
- 1989 Insel der Jugend, Berlin DDR
- 1990 Galerie Defet, Nürnberg
- 1992 Galerie Zwinger, Berlin
- 1996 Galerie Weiss Berlin, HDK Berlin, Art Chicago, KH Bethanien Berlin,
- 1997 Stadtmuseum Mainz, Albertinum Dresden, La Salpetriere Paris, Festspiele Zurich
- 1998 HFBK Hamburg, NBK Berlin, Podewil Berlin, Kunsthal Copenhagen
- 1999 HH Bahnhof Berlin, Alte Pinakothek Munich, Stadtgalerie Saarbruecken, Kunsthalle Hamburg
- 2000 Maximiliansforum Munich, Goethe-Institut S. de Bahia, Museum of Concrete Art Ingolstadt
- 2001 art on Gallery Berlin, Kunsthal Copenhagen, L´ Usine Geneve, Kunstmuseum Luzern
- 2002 neues museum Nuremberg, artforum Berlin, Zicco House Beirut, KH Bethanien Berlin
- 2003 Museum of Modern Art Frankfurt, The Arches Glasgow, HAU 1 Berlin
- 2004 Academy of Art Bergen, Museum Center Krasnojarsk, State Art Museum Novosibirsk
- 2005 Gasteig Munich, Mies van der Rohe Barcelona Pavilion, corpi urbani Genova
- 2006 Goethe-Institut Cairo, Academy of Arts Berlin, Galerie Wort+Bild Berlin, Oper Leipzig
- 2007 Centro Arte Contemporaneo Malaga, Vooruit Gent, Center of Contemporary Art Linz
- 2008 Fondazione Volume Rome, Centro Cultural Reina Sofia, Cadiz, Stadsschouburg Utrecht
- 2009 Centro Cultural de Belem Lisbon, Escena Contemporanea Madrid, Goethe-Institut La Paz
- 2010 Kunsthaus Aarau, mothership Rotterdam, Goethe-Institut Tunis, Museo Artium, Gasteiz
- 2011 Alhondiga Art Center Bilbao, Centre Pompidou Metz, Crawford Art Gallery York
- 2012 Scene National Theatre Bretigny, Goethe-Institut Caracas, Sin Fronteras Zaragoza
- 2013 Beurschouwburg Bruxelles, Theatre de Warande Turnhout, Scene Conventionne Saint Medard
- 2014 ARCUB Bucharest, Goethe-Institut Algiers, TAC Valladolid, International Magic Festival Edinburgh
- 2015 ZKM Globale Karlsruhe, vienna biennale Vienna, Galerie Burster Berlin, Goethe Institut Helsinki
- 2017 Intern. Festival of Art San Jose, Dreifaltigkeitskirche Worms, Quartier 104 Paris, ZAT Montpellier
- 2018 China Academy of Art Hangzhou, Theaterfestival Willebroek
- 2020 Painting Wow Kunstsäle Berlin, Druckhaus Saalpresse Bergsdorf, Knock Hard Studio Berlin
- 2021 theater fabrik Potsdam, Knock Hard Studio Berlin, Art Today – City Gallery Plovdiv

=== Selected publications ===
- Johan Lorbeer, Performances, Publ. KH Bethanien Berlin 1998, ISBN 3-89462-059-5
- Johan Lorbeer, Verlag fuer moderne Kunst, Nuremberg 1999, ISBN 3-928342-99-1
- Johan Lorbeer, Monographie, Kunstforum International 2005, Bd. 178
- Johan Lorbeer, Geschaeftsbericht, Verlag fuer moderne Kunst, Nuremberg 2010, ISBN 978-3-941185-85-2

=== Selected contributions/anthologies ===
- PAN, Benteli Verlag, Bern 1992, ISBN 3-7165-0828-4
- XX. Jahrhundert, Nicolai Verlag, Berlin 1999, ISBN 3-87584-869-1
- Kunst und Arbeit, Klartext Verlag, Essen 2000 ISBN 3-88474-886-6
- Defet – neues museum, VfmK, Nuernberg 2002, ISBN 3-933096-89-8
- Kunstjahr 2002, Lindinger+Schmid, Regensburg 2002, ISBN 3-929970-52-X
- Tatlin news+mono, Publ. Sergey Kovalevsky, Moscow 2007
- Gravity, MM artbook, Cork 2011, ISBN 978-1-874756-09-5
- VIENNA BIENNALE, VfmK, Vienna 2015, ISBN 978-3-903004-24-5
- Performing Public Art, Verlag de Gruyter, Berlin 2015, ISBN 978-3-11-045757-5
