= Association of American Physicians =

Honorary medical society

- Tax ID no.: 42-1193723
- Legal status: 501(c)(3)
- President: John Ioannidis
- Revenue: 302,520 (2017)
- Website: aap-online.org

The Association of American Physicians (AAP) is an honorary medical society founded in 1885 by the Canadian physician Sir William Osler and six other distinguished physicians of his era for "the advancement of scientific and practical medicine."

Election to the AAP is an honor extended to individuals with outstanding credentials in biomedical science and/or translational biomedical research and is limited to 60 persons per year. The AAP includes about 1000 active members and 550 emeritus and honorary members. The great majority are US citizens. However, other countries are also represented.

== Mission ==
The overarching goals of the AAP include the promotion of professional and social interaction among biomedical scientists, the dissemination of important information related to biomedical science and teaching, the recognition of outstanding scientists through membership, and the establishment of role models to kindle new generations of high achievers in medicine and medical science.

The range of topics studied by members of the AAP is as broad as medicine itself, ranging from fundamental biological questions to translational research (development and testing of new treatments) to public policy issues. The "Transactions of the Association of American Physicians," published until 1995, recorded the presentations of members at the annual meeting. In that year, it was replaced by the bimonthly "Proceedings of the Association of American Physicians" (no longer published).

The AAP honors selected scientists with the George M. Kober Medal (started in 1927; awarded annually since 1929, except for 1944 and 1946) and the George M. Kober Lectureship (awarded every three years since 1925), for outstanding contributions to medicine or medical science.

The AAP holds a joint meeting each year with the American Society for Clinical Investigation (ASCI), another honorary medical society with closely related goals.

== History ==
The AAP held its first meeting in 1886. Some of the most important advances in biomedical science were first reported at annual AAP meetings. These included the discovery of insulin by Banting and Macleod in 1922, and discovery, by Minot and Murphy in 1926, that pernicious anemia could be treated by feeding patients extracts of raw liver.

Members of the AAP have included Nobel laureates, and members of the United States National Academy of Sciences and the Institute of Medicine. Living members of the AAP who have also been awarded the Nobel Prize in Physiology or Medicine include Barry Marshall, Stanley Prusiner, Michael S. Brown, Joseph L. Goldstein, and others.
