= Esmond Ray Long =

American biochemist (1890–1979)

- Born: June 16, 1890; Chicago, Illinois
- Died: November 11, 1979 (aged 89)
- Education: Ph.D. (1918), M.D. (1926)
- Alma mater: University of Chicago
- Known for: Study of Mycobacterial disease
- Spouse: Marian Beak Adams
- Children: Judith Baird, Esmond R. Long
- Parents: John Harper Long (father); Catherine Belle Stoneman (mother)
- Scientific career
- Thesis: Some Phases of Normal and Abnormal Purine Metabolism in Man and Domestic Animals (1913)
- Doctoral advisor: Ludvig Hektoen

Esmond "Es" Ray Long (June 16, 1890 – November 11, 1979) was an American pathologist, epidemiologist, and medical historian. He was named emeritus professor of pathology at the University of Pennsylvania and was the director of the Henry Phipps Institute for the Study, Treatment and Prevention of Tuberculosis from 1935 until 1955. Long served in the United States Army Medical Corps during World War II as director of the tuberculosis program.

== Biography ==
He was born in Chicago, Illinois, the son of John Harper Long and Catherine Belle née Stoneman. His father was professor of chemistry at Northwestern University, and a pioneer in physiological chemistry. Long completed his secondary education at Morgan Park Academy in 1906, then spent a year receiving private tutelage in chemistry from his father and others. He matriculated to the University of Chicago where he majored in chemistry. In 1909 he was a member of the university cross-country team, then he joined the track team in 1910, demonstrating his fitness at the time. Long was awarded his A. B. degree in 1911, then entered graduate school in the university's school of medicine.

In 1913, during his second year as a medical student, Long had a severe pulmonary hemorrhage. From his sputum, Long identified tubercle bacilli at his laboratory, indicating he had contracted active tuberculosis (TB). He would spend the next six years undergoing various ineffective therapies for the condition, while studying and performing research on the disease. He would continue on this path of investigation for the next half century. During 1917–1918 and again in 1920 he was a Trudeau Fellow at the Saranac Laboratory for the study of Tuberculosis, working under its director Edward R. Baldwin. Long received his Ph.D. in 1918 with a thesis titled, Some Phases of Normal and Abnormal Purine Metabolism in Man and Domestic Animals. In the summer of 1919, he worked as an intern at Saranac Lake Reception Hospital, providing assistance for patients while living out of a tent. The same year he had recovered sufficiently to join the department of pathology at the University of Chicago, working as an instructor.

In 1921, Long was named assistant professor at the university. He spent the summer at Stanford University Medical School, working on a clinical study. On his return trip to Chicago in September he visited Marian Beak Adams in Denver, a distant relative. They were married on June 17, 1922, and would have a daughter, Judith Baird, and a son, Esmond R. Long Jr. Marian was a skilled pianist and taught piano students. The couple would honeymoon in Vienna, Austria, where Long performed post-graduate research at the University of Prague under the Austrian pathologist Anton Ghon. The following year, Long would collaborate with Harry G. Wells and Lydia M. DeWitt to publish a book titled, The chemistry of Tuberculosis. He was named associate professor in 1923. During his TB studies he frequently collaborated with his assistant, Florence Seibert. Together they isolated the protein which formed the active principle of TB. In 1926 Long received his M.D. from the Rush Medical College, then part of the University of Chicago.

In 1932, Long moved to Philadelphia with his family, where he became professor of pathology at the University of Pennsylvania and a researcher at the Henry Phipps Institute for the Study, Treatment and Prevention of Tuberculosis, bringing with him Florence Seibert. In time, she was able to crystallize and purify the substance that served as basis of the PPD skin test used for TB screening to the present day. He became a member of the advisory committee on research for the Leonard Wood Memorial. In 1935 he was named head of the Phipps Institute, and would remain director until his retirement in 1955. From 1936 to 1939 he chaired the National Research Council's division of medical sciences. During 1936–1937 he was board chair for the American Lung Association. He was president of the Wistar Institute of Anatomy and Biology from 1939 until 1942. In 1938, he was president of the American Association of Pathologists and Bacteriologists.

With World War II under way, in 1940 the National Research Council asked Long to chair the tuberculosis subcommittee of the Division of Medical Sciences. After the U.S. entered the war in 1941, Long received a commission as Colonel in the Medical Corps. He relocated to Washington D.C. with his family so he could work out of the Office of the Surgeon General. As director of the U.S. army tuberculosis program, Long set up a screening program to keep tuberculosis out of the armed forces and oversaw TB research and treatment programs in the U.S. In 1945, he traveled to the Europe theater where he visited the Army medical personnel treating former prisoners at the Buchenwald and Dachau concentration camps. Following the war, he organized the tuberculosis treatment program in Allied-occupied Germany.

From 1947 until 1952 he served as the executive secretary of the American Review of Tuberculosis, becoming editor-in-chief in 1948. He served as special editor of medicine for the Webster's International Dictionary, second edition. Long officially retired in 1955 and the family moved to a retirement residence in Pedlar Mills, Virginia, but he remained active in his scientific interests long thereafter. In 1964, he succeeded H. W. Wade as editor of the International Journal of Leprosy. The Long family returned to Philadelphia in 1966. Marian died of leukemia in 1974, and Long died November 11, 1979 at a nursing home in Devon, Pennsylvania.

== Awards and honors ==
- Youngest person to be awarded the Trudeau Medal by the National Tuberculosis Association (1932)
- Honorary member of the Philadelphia County Medical Society (1937)
- Elected to the American Philosophical Society (1940)
- Elected to the National Academy of Sciences (1946)
- Philadelphia Bok Award (1954)
- Gold headed cane of the American Association of Pathologists and Bacteriologists (1971)

== Bibliography ==
In addition to publishing nearly 300 articles and editorials, Long was the author (or co-author) of several books:

- Wells, Harry Gideon; De Witt, Lydia Maria Adams; Long, Esmond Ray (1923), The chemistry of Tuberculosis, Williams & Wilkins.
- Long, Esmond Ray, ed. (1924), Selected Readings in Pathology from Hippocrates to Virchow, C. C. Thomas, ISBN 9780398011413.
- Long, Esmond Ray (1925), Tuberculosis: its causes and prevention, Haldeman-Julius Company.
- Long, Esmond Ray (1928), A history of pathology, Williams & Wilkins, ISBN 978-0-8446-2484-6.
- Long, Esmond Ray; Jablon, Seymour (1955), Tuberculosis in the Army of the United States in World War II, U.S. Government Printing Office.
- Long, Esmond Ray (1956), A History of the Therapy of Tuberculosis and the Case of Frederic Chopin, University of Kansas Press, ISBN 9780598364333.
- Long, Esmond Ray (1962), A history of American pathology, Springfield, Illinois: Charles C. Thomas, ISBN 9780398011406.
