= American Association of Pathologists and Bacteriologists =

The American Association of Pathologists and Bacteriologists (AAPB) was an American national professional association established in 1901, devoted to fundamental science and academic medicine as distinct from clinical medicine. In 1976, they joined with the American Society for Experimental Pathology (ASEP) to form the American Association of Pathologists (AAP), which in 1992 became the American Society for Investigative Pathology (ASIP).

In 1924 the Council voted to end the Journal of Medical Research and with a grant from the General Education Board of the Rockefeller Foundation, the AAPB started the American Journal of Pathology on January 1, 1925, noting on the cover that it was a continuation of the Journal of Medical Research.

== Past presidents of the AAPB ==
- 1901 - William T. Councilman
- 1902 - William T. Howard Jr.
- 1903 - Ludvig Hektoen
- 1904 - Eugene Hodenpyl
- 1905 - Simon Flexner
- 1906 - James Ewing
- 1907 - William H. Welch
- 1908 - Aldred S. Warthin
- 1909 - Harold C. Ernst
- 1910 - Frank Burr Mallory
- 1911 - Edwin R. LeCount
- 1912 - Richard M. Pearce Jr.
- 1913 - Herbert U. Williams
- 1914 - John J. MacKenzie
- 1915 - Leo Loeb
- 1916 - John F. Anderson
- 1914 - William H. Park
- 1918 - Eugene L. Opie
- 1919 - Oskar Klotz
- 1920 - H. Gideon Wells
- 1921 - Howard T. Karsner
- 1922 - Harry T. Marshall
- 1923 - Paul A. Lewis
- 1924 - Theobald Smith
- 1925 - Harold E. Robertson
- 1926 - Augustus B. Wadsworth
- 1927 - Hans Zinsser
- 1928 - James W. Jobling
- 1929 - Edward Bell Krumbhaar
- 1930 - George H. Whipple
- 1931 - George R. Callender
- 1932 - Ward J. MacNeal
- 1933 - Elexious T. Bell
- 1934 - Oswald T. Avery
- 1935 - William Boyd
- 1936 - S. Burt Wolbach
- 1937 - N. Chandler Foot
- 1938 - Esmond R. Long
- 1939 - Earl B. McKinley (died July 29, 1938; Vice-President Carl T. Weller presided)
- 1940 - Carl T. Weller
- 1941 - S. Bayne-Jones
- 1942 - Samuel R. Haythorn
- 1943–46 - Paul R. Cannon
- 1947 - Wiley D. Forbus
- 1948 - Malcolm H. Soule
- 1949 - Ernst W. Goodpasture
- 1950 - Shields Warren
- 1951 - Tracy B. Mallory
- 1952 - Robert A. Moore
- 1953 - William H. Feldman
- 1954 - James B. McNaught
- 1955 - G. Lyman Duff
- 1956 - Edwin W. Schultz
- 1957 - Granville A. Bennett
- 1958 - Sidney Farber
- 1959 - Alan R. Moritz
- 1960 - Douglas H. Sprunt
- 1961 - John G. Kidd
- 1962 - D. Murray Angevine
- 1963 - Sidney C. Madden
- 1964 - Edward A. Gall
- 1965 - William B. Wartman
- 1966 - Thomas D. Kinney
- 1967 - Patrick J. Fitzgerald
- 1968 - John R. Carter
- 1969 - Robert W. Wissler
- 1970 - J. Lowell Orbison
- 1971 - Robert E. Stowell
- 1972 - Chandler A. Stetson
- 1973 - Henry D. Moon
- 1974 - Kenneth M. Brinkhous
- 1975 - D. W. King Jr.
