= Michalopoulou =

Michalopoulou (Greek: Μιχαλοπούλου) is a Greek surname. Notable people with the surname include:

- Katerina Michalopoulou (born c. 1972), Greek model
- Michaela Michalopoulou (born 1980), Greek handball player
- Zoi-Heleni Michalopoulou, Greek and American applied mathematician, acoustical engineer, and oceanographer

== See also ==
- Michalopoulos
