= Paul Cannon =

Paul Cannon may refer to:

- Paul C. Cannon (1896–1986), American businessman and lieutenant governor of Montana
- Paul Roberts Cannon (1892–1986), American physician and medical professor
