= St. Mark's Episcopal Church (Ashland, New Hampshire) =

Historic church in New Hampshire, United States

- U.S. National Register of Historic Places
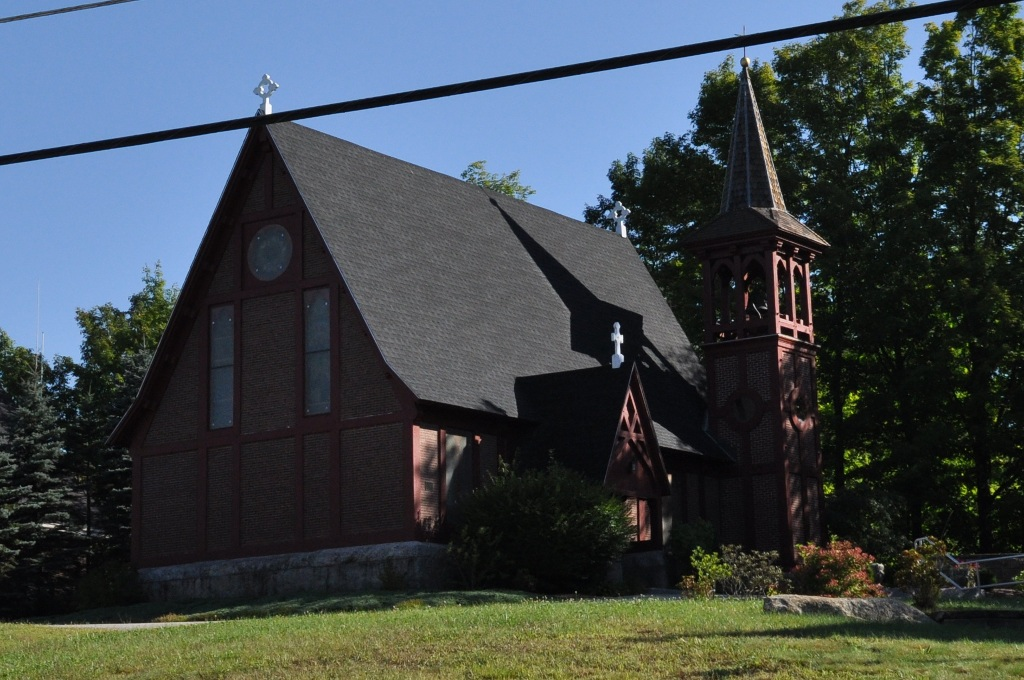

- Location within New Hampshire Location within the United States
- Location: 6-8 Highland Street; Ashland, New Hampshire
- Coordinates: 43°41′48″N 71°37′57″W
- Area: 0.8 acres (0.32 ha)
- Built: 1859
- Architect: Hart, J. Coleman
- Architectural style: Gothic Revival
- NRHP reference No.: 84000522
- Added to NRHP: December 13, 1984

St. Mark's Episcopal Church is an historic Episcopal church located at 6-8 Highland Street in Ashland, New Hampshire, in the United States. Organized in 1855, it is part of the Episcopal Diocese of New Hampshire. Its building, completed in 1859, was designed by New York City architect J. Coleman Hart, and is one of the region's most distinctive churches, having a Gothic Revival design built out of half-timbered brick. On December 13, 1984, the church building was added to the National Register of Historic Places.

The current pastor is the Rev. Tobias Nyatsambo. The church reported 41 members in 2015 and 72 members in 2023; no membership statistics were reported in 2024 parochial reports. Plate and pledge income reported for the congregation in 2024 was $0.00 with average Sunday attendance (ASA) of no persons.

== Architecture and history ==
St. Mark's is located in the village center of Ashland, on the east side of Highland Street just south of the town hall. It is a single-story building, its exterior consisting of half-timber framing filled with brick usually laid in stretcher bond, and set on a granite foundation. Stained glass windows are set in their own panel sections, and have cinquefoil arched heads and beveled surrounds. To the southeast of the main block stands a tower with an open belfry, which is topped by a hip roof that transitions into an octagonal steeple shingled with fishscale wood shingles.

The Episcopal congregation in Ashland was established in 1855, and originally met in the town's union church. Planning for construction of this building began in 1857, and the first services were held on Christmas Day, 1859. It was formally consecrated in 1853, when its construction debts were paid off. The building was designed by J. Coleman Hart, an architect from New York City about whom little is known. The design is a high quality and distinctive example of Gothic Revival architecture, unusual for its use of brick and timber instead of either stone or wood framing. The building is the only known church in New Hampshire's Lakes Region built in this style. The accompanying parish house, built in 1899, is an example of Shingle style architecture.

== See also ==
- National Register of Historic Places listings in Grafton County, New Hampshire
- St. Mark's Episcopal Church (disambiguation)
