= Whipple House (Ashland, New Hampshire) =

Historic house in New Hampshire, United States

- U.S. National Register of Historic Places
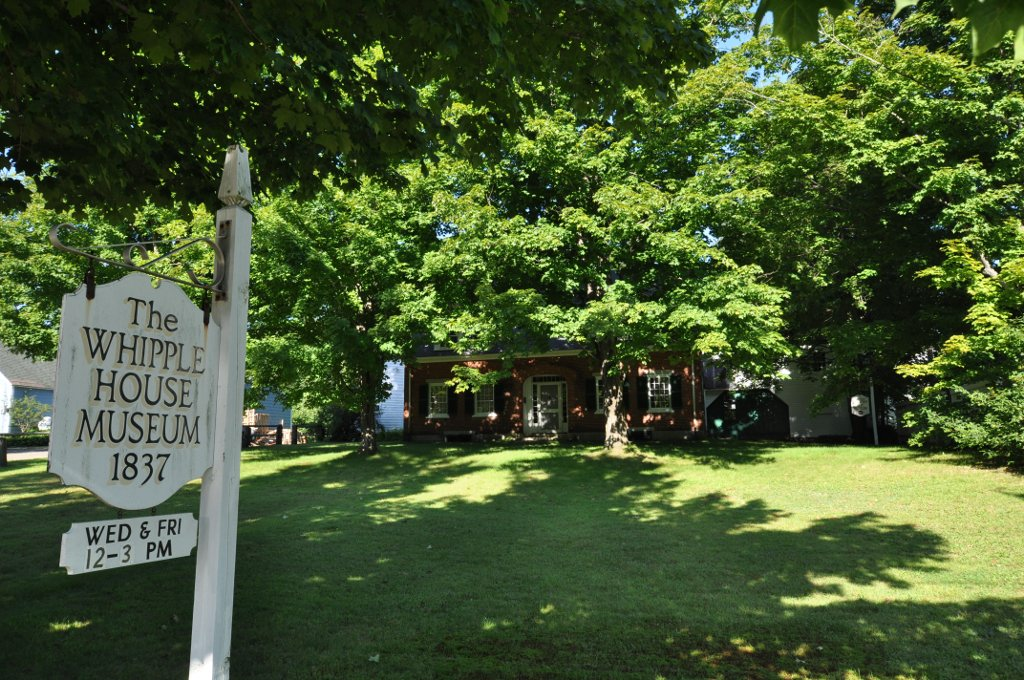

- Location within New Hampshire Location within the United States
- Location: 4 Pleasant St., Ashland, New Hampshire
- Coordinates: 43°41′40″N 71°37′54″W
- Area: 0.8 acres (0.32 ha)
- Built: 1837
- NRHP reference No.: 78000338
- Added to NRHP: December 13, 1978

The Whipple House is a historic house museum at 4 Pleasant Street in Ashland, New Hampshire. Built about 1837, it is a well-preserved example of a mid-19th century Cape-style house, that is relatively architecturally undistinguished. It is significant for its association with George Hoyt Whipple (1878–1976), a Nobel Prize-winning doctor and pathologist who was born here. Whipple gave the house to the town in 1970, and it is now operated by the Ashland Historical Society as a museum, open during the warmer months. The house was listed on the National Register of Historic Places in 1978.

== Description and history ==
The Whipple House is located on a residential street in the village of Ashland, on the west side of Pleasant Street south of Main Street. It is a 1½-story brick building, with a gabled roof, two end chimneys, and a wood-frame ell to the rear. Its front facade is five bays wide, with sash windows arranged symmetrically around the center entrance, and a pair of gabled two-window dormers in the roof face. The entrance is recessed under a segmented-arch opening, along with flanking sidelight and transom windows. The interior follows a center hall plan, with two rooms on either side of the main hall and in the attic. The ell houses the kitchen on the ground floor and bedrooms above.

The house was built about 1837, and is a good example of a traditional colonial form, the Cape-style house, adapted to the then-modern heating method of wood stoves instead of open fireplaces. It is here that George Hoyt Whipple was born in 1878, and the house remained in the family until he donated it to the town for use as a museum. Whipple was awarded the Nobel Prize for Medicine in 1934 (along with two others) for his work in developing an understanding and cure for pernicious anemia, and did much groundbreaking work to improve the understanding of human liver function.

== See also ==
- National Register of Historic Places listings in Grafton County, New Hampshire
- New Hampshire Historical Marker No. 100: George Hoyt Whipple
