= Ashland (CDP), New Hampshire =

Census-designated place in New Hampshire, United States

Ashland, New Hampshire
- Census-designated place
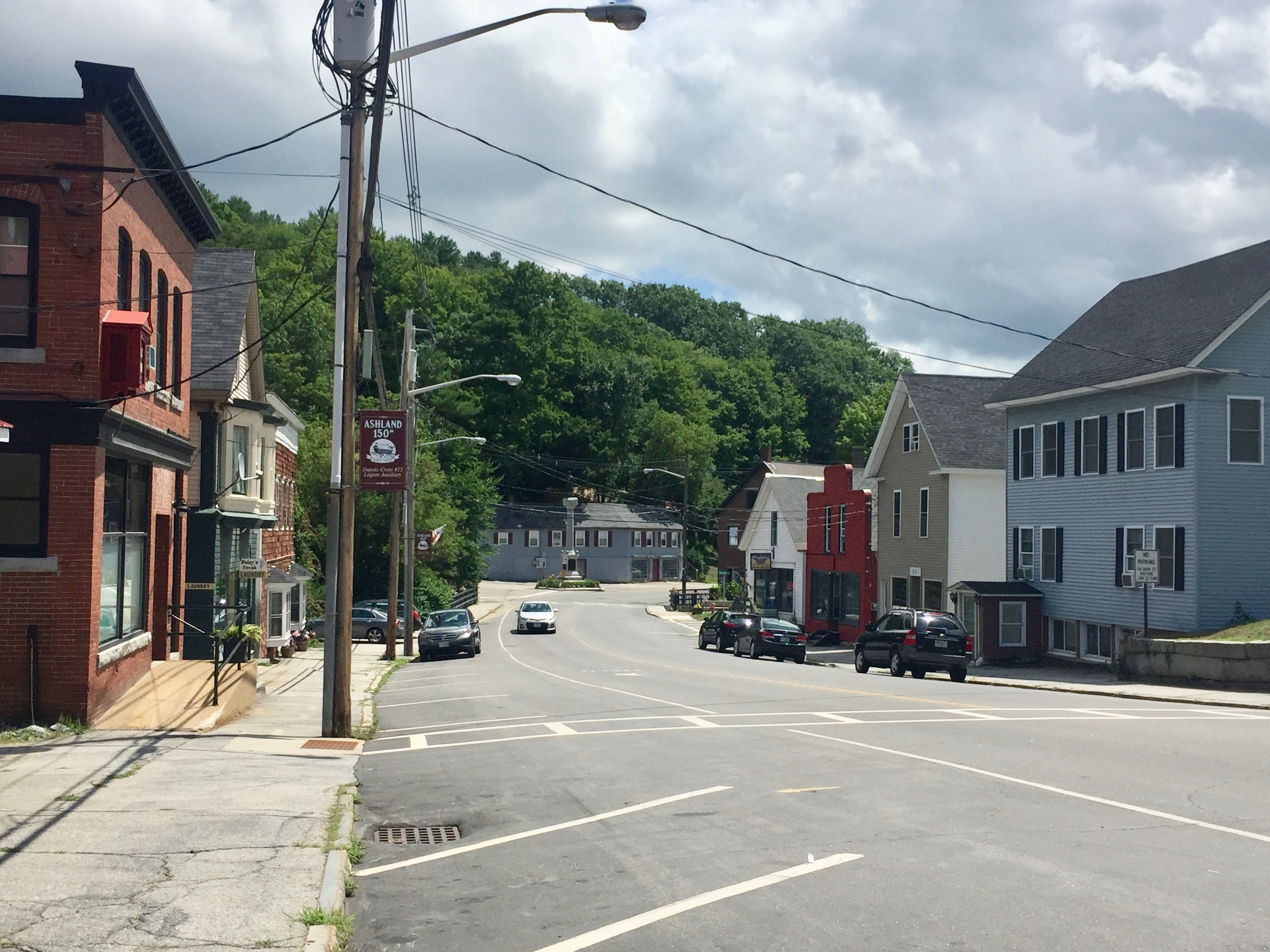
- Main Street in Ashland. Civil War monument in distance.

- Location within New Hampshire Location within the United States
- Coordinates: 43°41′44″N 71°37′44″W
- Country: United States
- State: New Hampshire
- County: Grafton
- Town: Ashland

Area
  - Total: 1.37 sq mi (3.54 km^{2})
  - Land: 1.33 sq mi (3.45 km^{2})
  - Water: 0.035 sq mi (0.09 km^{2})
- Elevation: 587 ft (179 m)

Population (2020)
  - Total: 1,082
  - Density: 812.3/sq mi (313.64/km^{2})
- Time zone: UTC-5 (Eastern (EST))
  - Summer (DST): UTC-4 (EDT)
- ZIP code: 03217
- Area code: 603
- FIPS code: 33-01940
- GNIS feature ID: 2629711

Ashland is a census-designated place (CDP) and the main village in the town of Ashland, New Hampshire, United States. The population of the CDP was 1,082 at the 2020 census, out of 1,938 in the entire town.

== Geography ==
The CDP is in the southwestern part of the town of Ashland, on both sides of the Squam River, which descends 50 feet (15 m) through the center of town. The CDP is bordered to the south by the town of New Hampton and to the west by Interstate 93. The northern border of the CDP runs east and west from the junction of River Street with U.S. Route 3 just south of the dam on the Squam River that controls the elevations Little Squam Lake and Squam Lake, while the eastern edge of the CDP is east of Thompson Street and Ledgewood Lane.

U.S. Route 3 and New Hampshire Route 25 run through the center of Ashland, leading northeast (US 3 southbound and NH 25 eastbound) 4 miles (6 km) to Holderness and northwest (US 3 northbound and NH 25 westbound) 6 miles (10 km) to Plymouth. Interstate 93 crosses Routes 3 and 25 on the west side of the CDP at Exit 24; I-93 leads north 49 miles (79 km) to Littleton and south 37 miles (60 km) to Concord. New Hampshire Route 132 runs south from Routes 3 and 25 in the center of Ashland 7 miles (11 km) to New Hampton.

According to the U.S. Census Bureau, the Ashland CDP has a total area of 1.4 square miles (3.5 km^{2}), of which 1.3 square miles (3.4 km^{2}) are land and 0.04 square miles (0.1 km^{2}), or 2.59%, are water.

== Demographics ==
Historical population
Census	Pop.	Note	%±
1950	1,215		—
1960	1,237		1.8%
1970	1,391		12.4%
1980	1,479		6.3%
2010	1,244		—
2020	1,082		−13.0%
U.S. Decennial Census

As of the census of 2010, there were 1,244 people, 599 households, and 305 families residing in the CDP. There were 685 housing units, of which 86, or 12.6%, were vacant. The racial makeup of the town was 96.9% white, 0.2% African American, 0.3% Native American, 0.9% Asian, 0.0% Pacific Islander, 0.3% some other race, and 1.4% from two or more races. 1.3% of the population were Hispanic or Latino of any race.

Of the 599 households in the CDP, 21.9% had children under the age of 18 living with them, 36.4% were headed by married couples living together, 11.7% had a female householder with no husband present, and 49.1% were non-families. 38.4% of all households were made up of individuals, and 16.4% were someone living alone who was 65 years of age or older. The average household size was 2.08, and the average family size was 2.79.

18.0% of people in the CDP were under the age of 18, 10.9% were from age 18 to 24, 24.4% were from 25 to 44, 29.4% were from 45 to 64, and 17.4% were 65 years of age or older. The median age was 42.8 years. For every 100 females, there were 92.3 males. For every 100 females age 18 and over, there were 86.8 males.

For the period 2011–15, the estimated median annual income for a household was $40,000, and the median income for a family was $52,452. Male full-time workers had a median income of $37,617 versus $27,007 for females. The per capita income for the CDP was $20,506. 14.9% of the population and 8.3% of families were below the poverty line, along with 16.3% of people under the age of 18 and 5.8% of people 65 or older.
