= Paul Roberts Cannon =

American pathologist (1892–1986)

- Born: August 25, 1892
- Died: September 7, 1986 (aged 94)
- Education: Millikin University
- Scientific career
- Fields: pathology
- Workplaces: University of Chicago

Paul Roberts Cannon (25 August 1892 – 7 September 1986) was an American physician and medical professor. He was a pioneer in the study of nutritional effects on immune response.

== Education ==
Cannon completed his undergraduate education at Millikin University, graduating in 1915. His training was interrupted by World War I, during which he spent two years as a lieutenant with the US Army Sanitary Corps. After the war, he studied bacteriology at the University of Chicago, receiving his doctorate in 1921. He spent two years as a professor of pathology and bacteriology at the University of Mississippi School of Medicine, before returning to Chicago to enroll at Rush Medical College, where he earned his MD in 1926 while holding a professorship at the University of Chicago. He was mentored by the eminent pathologist and immunologist Harry Gideon Wells.

== Academic career and research ==
Cannon spent the rest of his career at the University of Chicago. He was appointed chair of the Department of Pathology in 1940, and held the position until he retired in 1957. His research centered on the effects of nutritional status on immune response, and had significant practical use in combating famine and its associated diseases in developing countries. He utilized rats (rather than the previously more favored rabbits) for his nutritional studies, due to their omnivorous diet and closer immunological similarity to humans. Cannon was able to clearly demonstrate the importance of adequate protein intake for health, as opposed to simply total caloric intake.

Cannon worked with the Journal of Immunology from 1936 to 1954, either as an associate editor or as part of the editorial board. He was also editor of the Archives of Pathology, a position he held from 1954 to 1963.

== Awards and honors ==
Cannon's research earned him a number of awards over the course of his career. He was elected to membership in the National Academy of Sciences in 1946. In 1948, he was awarded the American Society for Clinical Pathology's Ward Burdick Award for Distinguished Service to Pathology. He was awarded the Gold-Headed Cane Award in 1965, the highest honor bestowed by the American Society for Investigative Pathology.

Cannon served as president of the American Association of Immunologists for 1941–1942. He also served as president of the American Association of Pathologists and Bacteriologists and the American Society for Experimental Pathology.

== Personal life ==
Cannon and his wife had a small farm near Aurora, Illinois, where they lived after his retirement. He died on 7 September 1986.
