= Florence B. Seibert =

American biochemist

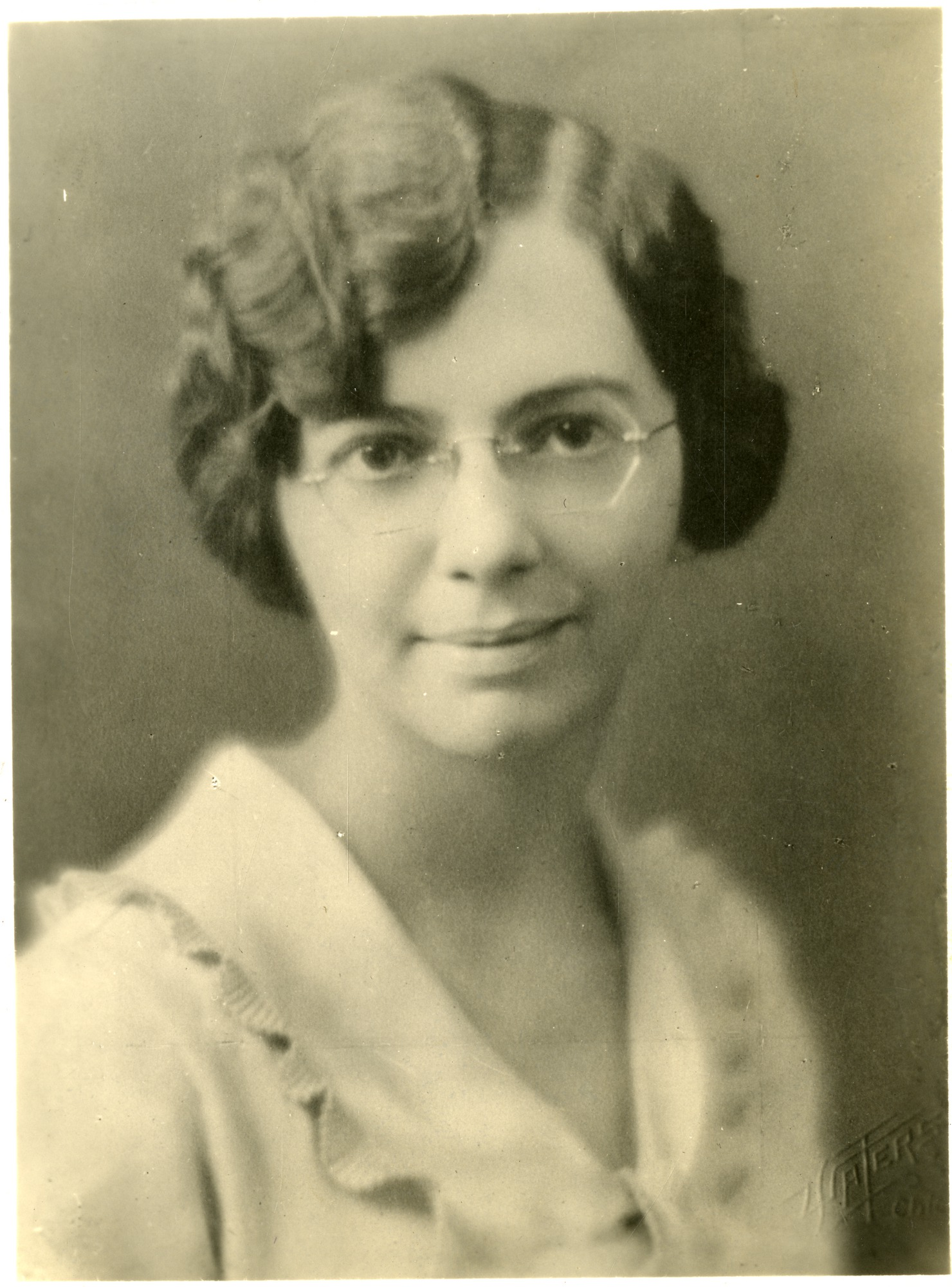
- Born: October 6, 1897; Easton, Pennsylvania, U.S.
- Died: August 23, 1991 (aged 93); St. Petersburg, Florida, U.S.
- Education: Goucher College; Yale University
- Known for: Isolating a pure form of tuberculin
- Awards: Howard Taylor Rickets Prize, Chicago (1924) Trudeau Medal, National Tuberculosis Association (1938) Garvan–Olin Medal (1942) American Association of University Women Achievement Award (1943)
- Scientific career
- Fields: Biochemistry
- Workplaces: University of Pennsylvania
- Doctoral advisor: Lafayette Mendel

Florence Barbara Seibert (October 6, 1897 – August 23, 1991) was an American biochemist. She is best known for identifying the active agent in the antigen tuberculin as a protein, and subsequently for isolating a pure form of tuberculin, purified protein derivative (PPD), enabling the development and use of a reliable TB test. Seibert has been inducted into the Florida Women's Hall of Fame and the National Women's Hall of Fame.

== Early life and education ==
Seibert was born on October 6, 1897, in Easton, Pennsylvania, to George Peter Seibert and Barbara (Memmert) Seibert. At age three, Florence contracted polio. She had to wear leg braces and walked with a limp throughout her life. As a teenager, Seibert is reported to have read biographies of famous scientists which inspired her interest in science.

Seibert did her undergraduate work at Goucher College in Baltimore, graduating Phi Beta Kappa in 1918. She and one of her chemistry teachers, Jessie E. Minor, did war-time work at the Chemistry Laboratory of the Hammersley Paper Mill in Garfield, New Jersey.

Seibert earned her Ph.D. in biochemistry from Yale University in 1923. At Yale she studied the intravenous injection of milk proteins under the direction of Lafayette Mendel. She developed a method to prevent these proteins from being contaminated with bacteria. She was a Van Meter Fellow from 1921 to 1922 and an American Physiological Society Porter Fellow from 1922 to 1923, both at Yale University.

== Professional achievements and awards ==
In 1923 Seibert worked as a postdoctoral fellow at the Otho S.A. Sprague Memorial Institute at the University of Chicago. She was financed by the Porter Fellowship of the American Philosophical Society, an award that was competitive for both men and women. She went on to work part-time at the Ricketts Laboratory at the University of Chicago, and part-time at the Sprague Memorial Institute in Chicago.

In 1924, she received the University of Chicago's Howard Taylor Ricketts Prize for work she began at Yale and continued in Chicago. At Yale she reported a curious finding: intravenous injections often caused fever in patients. Seibert determined that the fevers were caused by toxins produced by the bacteria. The toxins were able to contaminate the distilled water when spray from the boiling water in the distillation flask reached the receiving flask. Seibert invented a new spray-catching trap to prevent contamination during the distillation process. She published her pyrogen-free process in the American Journal of Physiology. It was subsequently adopted by the Food and Drug Administration, the National Institutes of Health, and various pharmaceutical firms. She was further recognized in 1962 with the John Elliot Memorial Award from the American Association of Blood Banks for her work on pyrogens.

Seibert served as an instructor in pathology from 1924 to 1928 at the University of Chicago and was hired as an assistant professor in biochemistry in 1928. In 1927, her younger sister Mabel moved to Chicago to live and work with her, employed variously as her secretary and her research assistant.

During this time, she met Esmond R. Long MD PhD, who was working on tuberculosis. In 1932 she agreed to relocate, with Long, to the Henry Phipps Institute at the University of Pennsylvania. He became professor of pathology and director of laboratories at the Phipps Institute, while she accepted a position as an assistant professor in biochemistry. Their goal was the development of a reliable test for the identification of tuberculosis. The previous tuberculin derivative, Koch's substance, had produced false negative results in tuberculosis tests since the 1890s because of impurities in the material.

With Long's supervision and funding, Seibert identified the active agent in tuberculin as a protein. Seibert spent a number of years developing methods for separating and purifying the protein from Mycobacterium tuberculosis, obtaining purified protein derivative (PPD) and enabling the creation of a reliable test for tuberculosis.

Her first publication on the purification of tuberculin appeared in 1934. Some sources credit her with successfully isolating the tuberculosis protein molecule during 1937–38, when she visited the University of Uppsala, Sweden, as a Guggenheim fellow to work with Nobel-prize winning protein scientist Theodor Svedberg. She developed methods for purifying a crystalline tuberculin derivative using filters of porous clay and nitric-acid treated cotton. In 1938, she was awarded the Trudeau Medal of the National Tuberculosis Association.

In the 1940s, Seibert's purified protein derivative (PPD) became a national and international standard for tuberculin tests.

In 1943, Seibert received the first Achievement Award from the American Association of University Women.

She remained at the Henry Phipps Institute at the University of Pennsylvania from 1932 to 1959. She was an assistant professor from 1932 to 1937, an associate professor from 1937 to 1955, a full professor of biochemistry from 1955 to 1959, and professor emeritus as of her official retirement in 1959.

She and her sister Mabel then moved to St. Petersburg, Florida, where Florence continued to research the possible relationships between bacteria and types of cancers, working with Mound Park Hospital and with the Bay Pines V.A. Research Center. She continued to publish scientific papers until 1977. Theories relating bacteria to cancer continue to be controversial.

In 1968, Seibert published her autobiography, Pebbles on the Hill of a Scientist.

Siebert received the Trudeau Medal from the National Tuberculosis Association in 1938, the Francis P. Garvan Medal from the American Chemical Society in 1942, and induction into the National Women's Hall of Fame in 1990. A historic marker was placed in her honor in Easton in 1993.

She died at the Palm Springs Nursing Home in St. Petersburg, Florida on August 23, 1991.

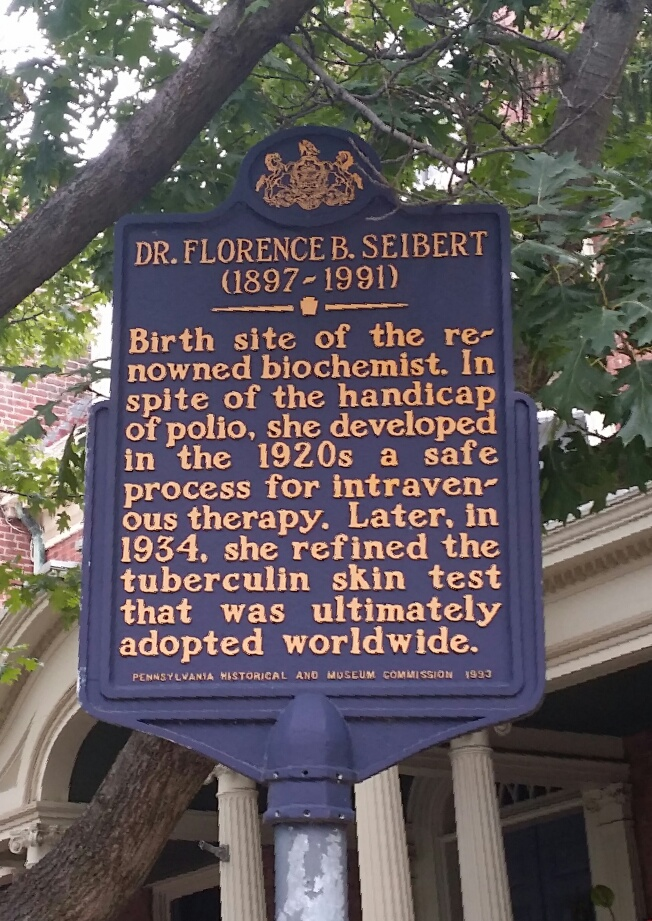
Dr. Florence Seibert Historical Marker in Easton

On November 3, 2013, a historical marker was dedicated at the location of her birth at 72 N. 2nd Street, Easton, PA.
