= Intersociety Council for Pathology Information =

The Intersociety Council for Pathology Information (ICPI) is a nonprofit educational organization that provides information about academic paths and career options in medical and research pathology.

== Directory of Pathology Training Programs in the United States and Canada ==
ICPI publishes the annual Directory of Pathology Training Programs in the United States and Canada and a companion online searchable directory.

== Career Development Resources ==
The Pathology: A Career in Medicine brochure describes the role of a pathologist in medical, research, and academic settings. Pathology: A Career in Medicine

== Sponsors ==
ICPI is sponsored by five charter pathology societies and twelve Associate member societies in North America, including the American Society for Investigative Pathology.

== Awards and Grants ==
Travel Awards support participation of medical students, graduate students, residents, and fellows in the scientific meetings of its sponsoring societies.

Career Outreach Grants promote awareness of pathology to the public, media, students, and professional and educational organizations.

The Medical Student Interest Group Matching Grants (MSIGs) encourages medical students to consider pathology as a career by providing funds to pathology departments to support MSIGs.
