= Ashland, New Hampshire =

- Town
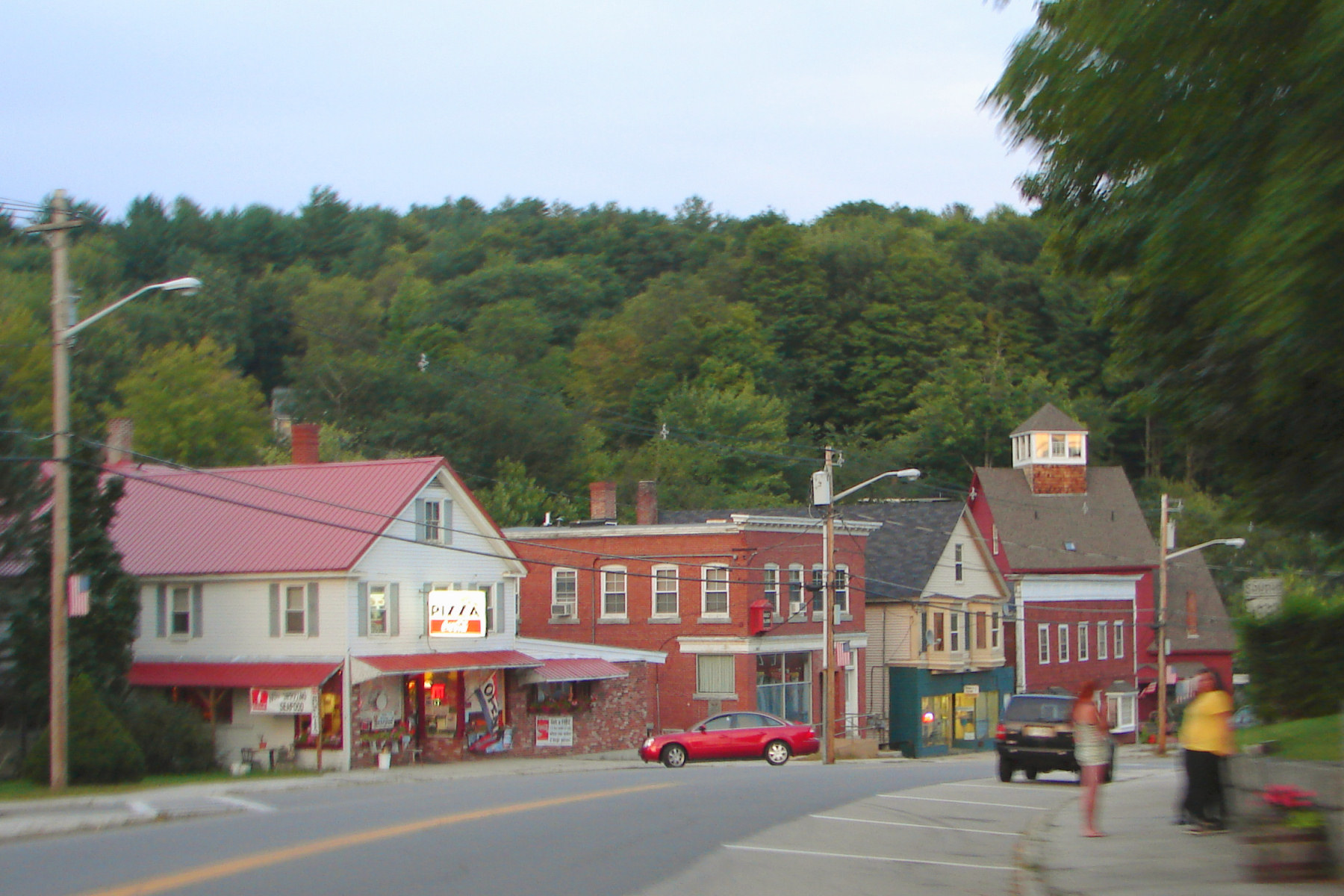
- Main Street

- Seal

- Location in Grafton County, New Hampshire
- Coordinates: 43°42′54″N 71°37′49″W
- Country: United States
- State: New Hampshire
- County: Grafton
- Incorporated: 1868

Area
  - Total: 11.8 sq mi (30.5 km^{2})
  - Land: 11.2 sq mi (29.1 km^{2})
  - Water: 0.54 sq mi (1.4 km^{2}) 4.63%
- Elevation: 689 ft (210 m)

Population (2020)
  - Total: 1,938
  - Density: 172/sq mi (66.6/km^{2})
- Time zone: UTC−5 (Eastern)
  - Summer (DST): UTC−4 (Eastern)
- ZIP Code: 03217
- Area code: 603
- FIPS code: 33-02020
- GNIS feature ID: 873534
- Website: ashland.nh.gov

Ashland is a town in Grafton County, New Hampshire, United States. The population was 1,938 at the 2020 census, down from 2,076 at the 2010 census. Located near the geographical center of the state, Ashland is home to Scribner-Fellows State Forest.

The main village of the town, where 1,082 people lived at the 2020 census, is defined as the Ashland census-designated place (CDP) and is located at the junction of U.S. Route 3 and New Hampshire Route 25 with NH Route 132.

== History ==
Ashland was once the southwestern corner of Holderness, chartered in 1751 by colonial Governor Benning Wentworth. However, hostilities during the French and Indian War delayed settlement, and in 1761, it was regranted as "New Holderness" (although "New" would be dropped in 1816). Settled in 1763, the town was predominantly agricultural except for Holderness Village on the Squam River, with falls that drop about 112 feet (34 m) before meeting the Pemigewasset River. The falls provided water power for mills, and in 1770–1771, a sawmill and gristmill were built. The Squam Lake Woolen Mill was established in 1840. Goods manufactured at local factories included hosiery, gloves, sporting equipment, wood products and paper.

The Boston, Concord & Montreal Railroad entered in 1849, carrying freight but also tourists bound for hotels on the Squam Lakes, to which they traveled by steamer up the Squam River. The interests of the industrialized settlement increasingly diverged from those of the farming community, however, and in 1868 Holderness Village was set off as Ashland, named for Ashland, the Kentucky estate of Henry Clay. The last textile mill, the L.W. Packard Company, closed in 2002, and Ashland is today a residential and resort community.

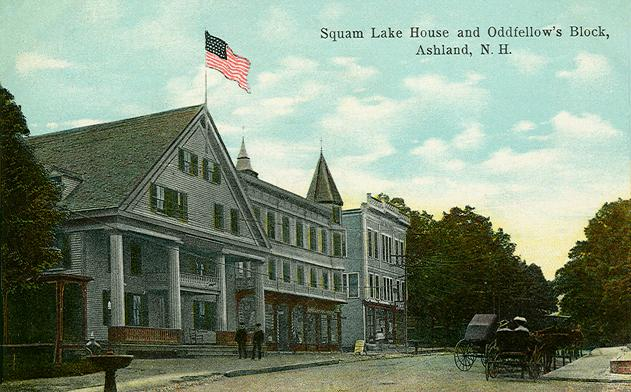
Downtown c. 1912

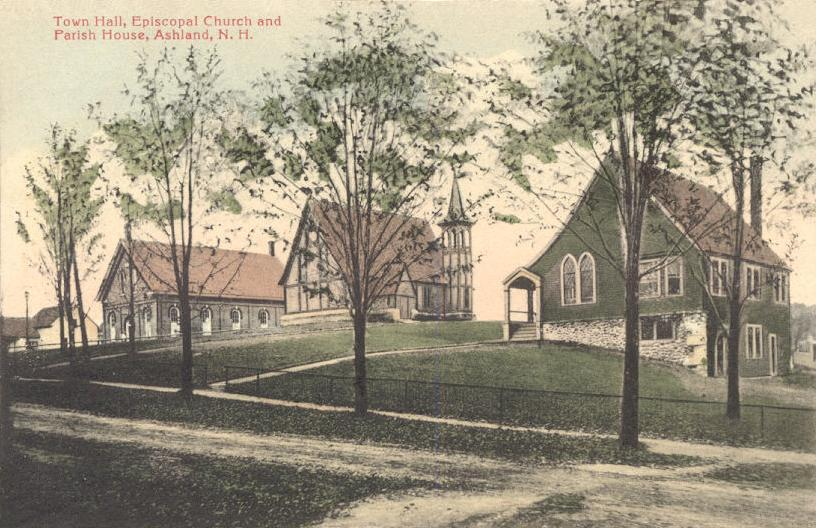
View of Town Hall c. 1910

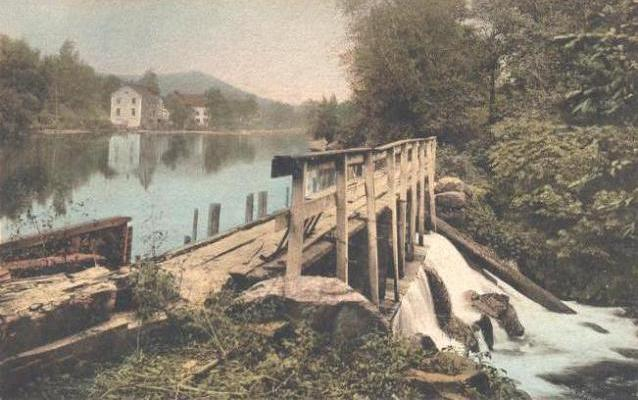
Mill dam c. 1910

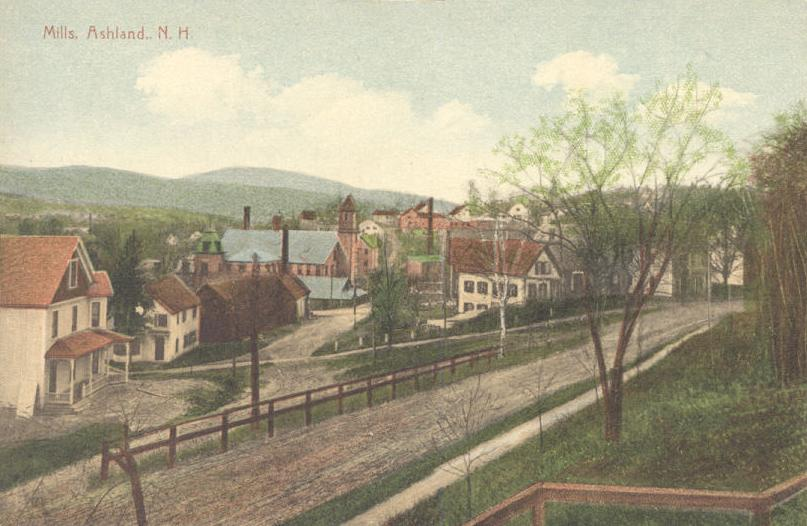
View of the mills c. 1908

== Geography ==
According to the United States Census Bureau, the town has a total area of 11.8 square miles (30.5 km^{2}), of which 11.2 square miles (29.1 km^{2}) are land and 0.54 square miles (1.4 km^{2}) are water, comprising 4.63 of the town. Bounded on the west by the Pemigewasset River, Ashland is drained by the Squam River and Owl Brook. Little Squam Lake is on the eastern boundary. The highest point in Ashland is Hicks Hill, at 1,386 feet (422 m) above sea level. Ashland lies fully within the Merrimack River watershed.

The town is served by Interstate 93, U.S. Route 3, and state routes 25, 132 and 175.

== Demographics ==
Historical population
Census	Pop.	Note	%±
1870	885		—
1880	960		8.5%
1890	1,193		24.3%
1900	1,289		8.0%
1910	1,412		9.5%
1920	1,325		−6.2%
1930	1,375		3.8%
1940	1,460		6.2%
1950	1,599		9.5%
1960	1,473		−7.9%
1970	1,599		8.6%
1980	1,807		13.0%
1990	1,915		6.0%
2000	1,955		2.1%
2010	2,076		6.2%
2020	1,938		−6.6%
U.S. Decennial Census

As of the census of 2010, there were 2,076 people, 980 households, and 522 families residing in the town. There were 1,355 housing units, of which 375, or 27.7%, were vacant. 267 of the vacant units were for seasonal or recreational use. The racial makeup of the town was 96.1% white, 0.4% African American, 0.2% Native American, 1.3% Asian, 0.0% Native Hawaiian or Pacific Islander, 0.2% some other race, and 1.7% from two or more races. Of the population, 0.9% were Hispanic or Latino of any race.

Of the 980 households, 22.4% had children under the age of 18 living with them, 39.8% were headed by married couples living together, 10.3% had a female householder with no husband present, and 46.7% were non-families. Of all households, 35.8% were made up of individuals, and 14.1% were someone living alone who was 65 years of age or older. The average household size was 2.12, and the average family size was 2.77.

In the town, 17.7% of the population were under the age of 18, 9.7% were from 18 to 24, 25.4% from 25 to 44, 30.4% from 45 to 64, and 16.8% were 65 years of age or older. The median age was 43.1 years. For every 100 females, there were 92.2 males. For every 100 females age 18 and over, there were 90.1 males.

For the period 2011–2015, the estimated median annual income for a household was $45,938, and the median income for a family was $52,106. Male full-time workers had a median income of $37,695 versus $27,130 for females. The per capita income for the town was $22,620. Of the population, 13.8% of the people and 8.6% of families were below the poverty line. Of the population, 17.7% under the age of 18 and 9.0% of those 65 or older were living in poverty.

== Sites of interest ==
- Ashland Railroad Station (c. 1869, 1891)
- Pauline E. Glidden Toy Museum (c. 1810)
- Whipple House Museum (1837)
- St. Mark's Episcopal Church, 1899

== Notable people ==
- James Frankland Briggs (1827–1905), US congressman
- Moses Cheney (1793–1875), abolitionist; member of the Underground Railroad
- Oren B. Cheney (1816–1903), founder of Bates College
- Person C. Cheney (1828–1901), US senator and the 43rd governor of New Hampshire
- George Hoyt Whipple (1878–1976), pathologist; Nobel Prize winner
