= Lydia DeWitt =

American pathologist and anatomist

- Born: Lydia Maria Adams; February 1, 1859; Flint, Michigan, US
- Died: March 10, 1928 (aged 69); Winters, Texas, US
- Education: Michigan State Normal School; University of Michigan (M.D., B.S. honorary M.S.)
- Occupations: Pathologist, anatomist, college professor and schoolteacher
- Employer(s): Michigan public school system, Washington University in St. Louis, St. Louis Department of Health, University of Chicago
- Spouse: Alton D. DeWitt
- Children: 2

Lydia Maria DeWitt (née Adams; February 1, 1859 – March 10, 1928) was an American pathologist and anatomist.

== Early life and education ==
Lydia Maria Adams was born in Flint, Michigan to Oscar and Elizabeth (née Walton) Adams, the second of three children. Her father was an attorney. Elizabeth died when Lydia was five, leaving her sister, who later married Oscar, to raise Lydia and her siblings.

Adams completed her primary education in the Flint public school system. She became a teacher, then studied at the Michigan State Normal School (also called the Ypsilanti Normal School) and married her colleague Alton D. DeWitt in 1878. They had two children, Stella, born in 1879, and Clyde, born in 1880. The family moved several times during this period as Alton obtained different jobs in the Michigan public school system; Lydia taught at a variety of public schools.

== Career and research ==
In 1895, she began medical studies at the University of Michigan; she earned her Doctor of Medicine degree in 1898 and Bachelor of Science degree in 1899. Lydia and Alton DeWitt separated during this time. DeWitt remained at University of Michigan for the beginning of her career in research. She held a position under George Dock as a demonstrator of anatomy from 1896–97, while she was still studying medicine, then became an assistant professor of histology until 1902, and associate professor of histology from 1902–1910.

She took a brief sabbatical to study at the University of Berlin in 1906. That year, she was starred in the first edition of American Men of Science for her notable work in microscopic anatomy and neuroanatomy. In 1910, DeWitt began to work at Washington University in St. Louis as an instructor of pathology, and also took a post in the St. Louis Department of Health as a pathologist/bacteriologist.

Her research there was so noted that she was invited to join the faculty of the University of Chicago to work on chemotherapy for tuberculosis, which she did in 1912. She was an assistant professor of pathology there until 1918, when she was elevated to associate professor. (Note: Errors were made by Marilyn Ogilvie on the trajectory of her career following her medical education. In 1986 Ogilvie stated that DeWitt began her career as an assistant anatomy professor at Washington University in St. Louis in 1899, shortly after receiving her medical degree. Primary sources, however, including the catalogue of the University of Michigan, list Dewitt as an Assistant in Anatomy at the University of Michigan in 1899.) She retired in 1926.

As a woman scientist, DeWitt was excluded from the Faculty Research Club and the Junior Faculty Research Club at the University of Michigan. In response, she founded and headed the Women's Research Club in 1902.

DeWitt's research career covered a variety of topics and organ systems, including the pathology of tuberculosis. She studied muscles extensively, in their pathology and nervous connections, as well as the disease myositis ossificans. Other topics of her research included esophageal anatomy, membranous dysmenorrhea, and the anatomy of connections in the mammalian heart.

Her early research, at the University of Michigan, concerned the structure of nerve endings in both sensory nerves and motor nerves of striated muscle and smooth muscle. This also included studies of muscle spindles, which were published in 1897, before she finished her medical studies. Her first solo research was published in 1901 and concerned the pyloric glands and their structure in different species. While at the St. Louis Department of Health, she conducted extensive research on diphtheria and diagnosis of typhoid. Her work on isolating the islets of Langerhans cells from the pancreas and her discovery that they secreted a substance involved in carbohydrate metabolism set the stage for the discovery of insulin and its role in diabetes by a Canadian team of researchers.

At the University of Chicago, DeWitt and her team worked on developing a drug to treat tuberculosis based on the work of Paul Ehrlich, who developed a treatment for syphilis by chemically modifying a dye that would stain parasites. Working with Hope Sherman, Gladys Leavell, and Lauretta Bender, among others, DeWitt examined several dyes as potential precursors to an anti-tuberculosis drug, including methylene blue and trypan red. This research did not bear fruit immediately, though the method was later used successfully to develop a chemotherapy for tuberculosis, and as a model for developing other drugs.

== Honors ==
In 1902, DeWitt joined the Association of American Anatomists. In 1914, she received an honorary Master's degree from the University of Michigan, her alma mater. DeWitt was the president of the Chicago Pathological Society from 1924–1925. The American Medical Association elected her an associate fellow. She was also a member of the Michigan Medical Society and the American Association of Pathologists and Bacteriologists.

== Death and legacy ==
DeWitt died at the age of 69 in Winters, Texas at the home of her daughter, of her chronic health problems (arteriosclerosis and hypertension). A research grant to support women scientists at the University of Michigan bears her name.
