= Frieda Robscheit-Robbins =

American pathologist (1893–1973)

Frieda S. Robscheit-Robbins (8 June 1893 – 18 December 1973) was a German-born American pathologist who worked closely with George Hoyt Whipple, conducting research into the use of diet in the treatment of long-term anemia, co-authoring 21 papers between 1925 and 1930. Whipple received a Nobel Prize in 1934 in recognition of this work, but Robscheit-Robbins was not recognized in this award, although Whipple did share the prize money with her. Had she won the Nobel Prize alongside Whipple, Robscheit-Robbins would have been the second woman after Marie Curie to win the prestigious international award, and the first American woman to do so. Although Robscheit-Robbins's has never received Nobel Prize recognition for her work, she has personally denied the importance of such awards. Robscheit-Robbins believed that the success and impact of the experiment exceeds the credit due in her works.

Robscheit-Robbins was described in 1981, as a woman "of considerable presence".

In 2002, a Discover magazine article entitled "The 50 Most Important Women in Science" noted that the contributions of Robscheit-Robbins "deserve greater notice".

== Early life and education ==
Robscheit-Robbins was born in Euskirchen, Germany in 1893 and moved to the United States as a child. She obtained her BS from the University of Chicago, her MS from the University of California, and her PhD from the University of Rochester.

== Research ==
Whipple and Robscheit-Robbins established an animal model of anemia. They found that when dogs lost a large amount of blood, they exhibited symptoms similar to anemia. Once they established this experimental model, they could test experimental therapies. They tested diets based on different organs: spleen, lung, liver, intestines, etc. They found that dogs fed a diet of liver recovered the quickest, suggesting that anemia is associated with malfunctioning livers.

Preliminary research was conducted in the early 1920s at the George William Hooper Foundation, University of California, where apricots were found to be valuable in treating induced anaemia in dogs. This result was so surprising to the researchers that it was not published. However, work continued at the University of Rochester, New York from 1922, where the researchers compared the efficacy of different substances in treatment of anaemia. Whipple and Robscheit-Robbins decided to experiment using dogs since they were willing to eat a wide variety of foods and large enough in size such that they could be kept in healthy condition despite undergoing frequent blood sampling. Robscheit-Robbins was responsible for the care of the dogs and it was frequent of her to present them along with their finding at scientific meetings. They conducted these experiments by feeding the dogs "salmon bread" over a long period of time to maintain a steady output of hemoglobin. They would then add specific foods into the diet to test their effects on hemoglobin produced. The liver was actually the first dietary food to be tested, which would be later found out exceeded other foods in hemoglobin production. Beef hearts was first believed to most favor hemoglobin production, but it was soon tested to perform inferior to the liver.

Robscheit-Robbins started working with Whipple in 1917, and she was his research partner for 38 years. While working with Whipple, Robscheit-Robbins has never obtained a higher position above a research associate despite planning and carrying out "Whipple's experiments". Over the length of her collaboration with Whipple from 1917 to 1955, she wrote over 100 articles on her research findings along with various medical textbook chapters on the subject of anemia. She was the first-named author on Whipple's single most important paper, and the first author is usually the one primarily responsible for the work on which the paper is based and in many fields of research the last author is the director of the laboratory or principal investigator responsible for the direction of the work. Of the 23 papers that Whipple cited in his Nobel address, Robscheit-Robbins was co-author of ten of them.

Robscheit-Robbins was a part of many societies that pertained to her career including: Society for Experimental Pathology, Physiological Society, and the New York Society for Medical Research. She was president for the New York Society for Medical Research in 1952. In 1951, Robscheit-Robbins was elected president of the American Society for Experimental Pathology, becoming the first woman to hold that position.

== The Matthew-Matilda Effect ==
The Matthew-Matilda Effect is the phenomenon in which a person receives credit for an achievement or publication over their co-contributors due to name recognition and/or gender bias. This effect applies to Robscheit-Robbins because of her omission from the winning of the Nobel Prize for Medicine in 1934. The Nobel Prize instead went to George Hoyt Whipple and two other male scientists despite Robscheit-Robbins being a co-author for a majority of the publications that were written.

== Personal life ==
In the year 1915, Robscheit-Robbins married Oscar V. Sprague. Together, the two had one child. She died in December 1973 in Tucson, Arizona, US.

== Selected publications ==
- Hooper, C.W., Robscheit, F.S. and Whipple, G.S. (1920). Blood Regeneration Following Simple Anemia I-V. American Journal of Physiology. 1920, 151-263.
