= Ashland Gristmill and Dam =

- U.S. National Register of Historic Places
- U.S. Historic district
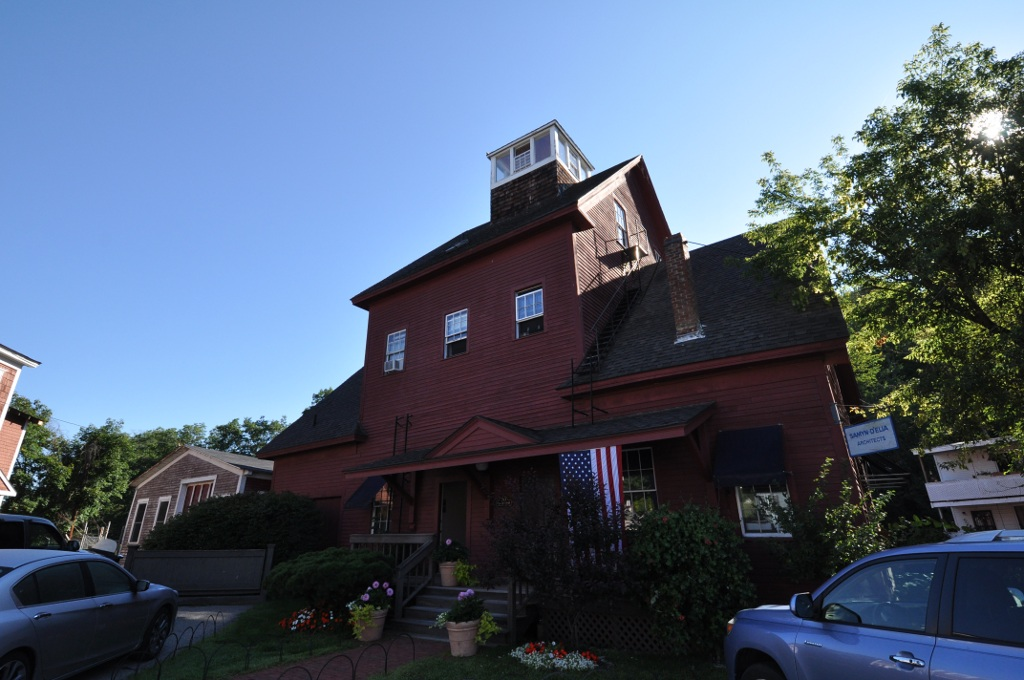

- Location within New Hampshire Location within the United States
- Location: Main St., Ashland, New Hampshire
- Coordinates: 43°41′44″N 71°37′51″W
- Area: less than one acre
- Built: 1903
- NRHP reference No.: 79000317
- Added to NRHP: December 10, 1979

The Ashland Gristmill and Dam are a historic former industrial facility in the heart of Ashland, New Hampshire. Built in 1903 on the site of an older mill, the gristmill demonstrates the continuing viability of wood framing for mill buildings in an era when it had become uncommon. The property was listed on the National Register of Historic Places in 1979. It has been converted to professional offices.

== Description and history ==
The former Ashland Gristmill is located near the eastern end of downtown Ashland, where Main Street (New Hampshire Route 132) crosses the Squam River. The mill stands just north of the road, with the dam extending further north across the river. The dam, originally a wooden construction, is a concrete structure 180 feet (55 m) long and 14 feet (4.3 m) high, and has a 50-foot (15 m) spillway. The mill is a large three-story structure, consisting of a central tower section with flanking two-story wings. The tower section is built using massive timbers for framing, while the wings are built using the more recent balloon framing method. Its basement still houses the turbine and controlling hardware, although these are no longer operational.

The mill was built in 1903, after the previous gristmill on the site was destroyed by fire. The central portion originally housed nine large hoppers, while the wings housed storage spaces for maintenance equipment and milled flour. The heavy timber framing was necessitated to help manage vibrations and stresses incurred by the operating machinery of the mill.

== See also ==
- National Register of Historic Places listings in Grafton County, New Hampshire
