= George Whipple =

American biomedical researcher (1878–1976)

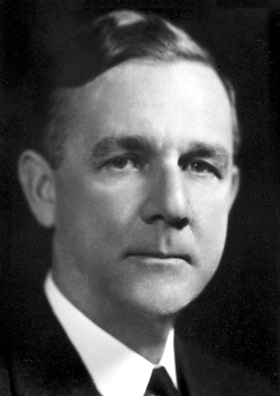
- Born: George Hoyt Whipple; August 28, 1878; Ashland, New Hampshire, U.S.
- Died: February 1, 1976 (aged 97); Rochester, New York, U.S.
- Parent(s): Ashley Cooper Whipple; Frances Anna Hoyt
- Scientific career
- Education: Yale University; Johns Hopkins School of Medicine
- Known for: Liver therapy in cases of anemia
- Awards: Nobel Prize in Physiology or Medicine in 1934
- Fields: Medicine
- Workplaces: University of Rochester; University of California, San Francisco

George Hoyt Whipple (August 28, 1878 – February 1, 1976) was an American physician, pathologist, biomedical researcher, and medical school educator and administrator. Whipple shared the Nobel Prize in Physiology or Medicine in 1934 with George Richards Minot and William Parry Murphy "for their discoveries concerning liver therapy in cases of anemia". This makes Whipple the first of several Nobel laureates affiliated with the University of Rochester.

== Early life ==
Whipple was born to Ashley Cooper Whipple and Frances Anna Hoyt in Ashland, New Hampshire. Ashley Cooper Whipple was a physician, and his father (George's paternal grandfather) was a physician and President of the New Hampshire Medical Society. Whipple's father died from pneumonia or typhoid fever when George was just shy of two years old. His maternal grandfather also died when Whipple was two years old, and his paternal grandfather died a year later. This left Whipple to be raised by his mother, Frances, and grandmother, Frances Moody Hoyt, who impressed on him the value of hard work and education.

== Education ==
Whipple attended Andover prep school and began attending Yale University as an undergraduate in 1896, earning A.B. degree in 1900. During these years, he developed as an outdoorsman, an affinity he would hold lifelong. He wrote in his autobiography about growing up in a lake district, "I feel very fortunate that I grew up in the country...I became interested in wild life and camping, also hiking, snowshoeing, skating, bob sledding, canoeing, fishing, hunting—all this was an essential part of my life". He even credited his love for the outdoors as a contributor to his successes in work, study, and teaching. In the summers of prep school and undergrad, he worked at a drugstore and at Squam Lake and Lake Winnipesaukee in New Hampshire providing help and ferry services to the tourists and campers. Of his summer experiences, Whipple said, "I sometimes think I learned as much during the summer work periods as during the school terms."

As an undergraduate, he became a member of Beta Theta Pi fraternity, and proved to be a prize-winning gymnast, oarsman, and an outstanding science student. His excellence in science was exemplified by his election to Sigma Xi honor society and graduation with senior honors. The interactions Whipple had with biochemists Russell Henry Chittenden and Lafayette Mendel during his senior year at Yale left an indelible mark on his life and career. In his autobiography, Whipple describes Mendel as "an unusual man who exerted a strong influence on me ... work with him was exciting and never to be forgotten".

With a shortage of funds to finance further education, Whipple took a year off after graduating Yale. During this year, he worked at Dr. Holbrook Military School in Ossining, New York, teaching mathematics and science, and serving as an athletic coach.

In 1901, under the advice, persuasion, and guidance of his mother, Whipple attended medical school at Johns Hopkins School of Medicine. He received his M.D. degree in 1905. To gain experience and subsidize his medical school studies, Whipple applied for and was accepted to a teaching assistantship in John J. Abel's Department of Physiological Chemistry. Later, his performance in his first year anatomy course earned him a second-year appointment as a student instructor in anatomy. During this time, his interest in histology developed. Under the mentorship of William Welch, Eugene Opie, and William McCallum, Whipple was inspired to correlate clinical illness and disease, to the tissue findings discovered on autopsy. Together, McCallum and Welch conspired to offer Whipple a position as junior member of the pathology department with the hope it would lead to Whipple become a pediatric pathologist. Ultimately, Whipple accepted the position which shaped his career aspirations to become a pathologist.

== Career ==
In 1905, Whipple joined the pathology department at Johns Hopkins School of Medicine as an assistant in pathology. He was promoted successively to Assistant, Instructor, Associate and associate professor in pathology until he left in 1914. During this time, he spent a year in Panama at Ancon Hospital as a pathologist. In Panama, he worked with Samuel Darling, a resident pathologist, and General Gorgas to gain experience in tropical diseases. This experience afforded him the opportunity to study massive hemolysis associated with blackwater fever. Before returning to Johns Hopkins School of Medicine after his time in Panama, Whipple traveled to Europe and spent time in the laboratories of Krehl and Morawitz in Heidelberg, where he learned about anemia in rabbits. In 1911, Whipple went to Vienna to study hepatic portal vein blood flow and its effects on hepatic functions in the dog with Hans Meyer.

In 1914, at 34 years old, Whipple married Katherine Ball Waring of Charleston, South Carolina. They had two children. He was also appointed Professor of Research Medicine, and Director of the Hooper Foundation for Medical Research at the UCSF Medical Center. He was dean of that medical school in 1920 and 1921.

In 1921, through the persistence of University of Rochester President Benjamin Rush Rhees, Whipple agreed to become a Professor and Chairman of Pathology, and the founding Dean of the yet-to-be-built medical school (URMC). Rhees was so determined to recruit Whipple, he personally flew to UC San Francisco to offer him the opportunity to build the medical school from the ground up. Whipple found this offer attractive because it would fulfil his passion to create a program which fostered an exchange between clinical and preclinical disciplines. His vision for the school included housing the medical school and hospital at the same site to facilitate this exchange. The first students entered URMC in 1925.

Whipple categorically discriminated against African-American students during his time as dean, and would send a form letter to applicants rejecting their admission and requesting they apply elsewhere. In 1939, A commission of the New York State Legislature found this practice to be in violation of New York's anti-discrimination laws, after which the URMC began to admit African-American medical students.

== Retirement ==
In 1953, at 75 years old, Whipple retired from the Deanship, and retirement from the university would follow in 1955. He was remembered as a superb teacher. In his autobiography, A Dozen Doctors, Whipple wrote, "I would be remembered as a teacher". He spent his retirement years dabbling in pathology department and medical school activities at the University of Rochester, but returned to his outdoors-man roots, filling his time with pheasant hunting, salmon fishing on the Margaree River, and tarpon fishing off the coast in Florida.

Whipple died in 1976 at the age of 97 and his ashes were scattered in Rochester's Mount Hope Cemetery.

Though he was not related to Allen Whipple, who described the Whipple procedure and Whipple's triad, the two were lifelong friends. The Whipples also had a deep friendship with George Eastman, founder of Rochester-based Eastman Kodak.

== Whipple's research ==
Over the course of his career, Whipple authored or co-authored more than 300 publications.

Whipple's research interests during his career primarily included anemia and the physiology and pathology of the liver. But he also researched and made significant contributions to tuberculosis, pancreatitis, chloroform poisoning in animals, the metabolism of bile pigments and iron, the constituents of the bile, and the regeneration of plasma protein, protein metabolism, and the stroma of the red blood cells.

One of his first publications described the role of the lungs, lymphatic system, and gastrointestinal tract in the spread of tubercle bacillus causing tuberculosis. Another one of his early publications described autopsy results from a patient with an accumulation of fatty acids in the walls of the small intestine and lymph nodes. He named this abnormality lipodystrophia intestinalis (intestinal lipodystrophy), and correctly pointed to the bacterial cause of the lipid deposits, resulting in the disease being named Whipple's disease.

When Whipple first joined Johns Hopkins School of Medicine as an assistant, he worked under William H. Welch, focusing on the repair and regeneration of liver cells. His research in dogs demonstrated that liver cells had an almost unlimited ability to regenerate. Through his chloroform liver injury studies, Whipple demonstrated that the liver was the site of fibrinogen synthesis. His research elucidated the route by which bile pigments enter circulation and produce jaundice in various parts of the body.

Later, he studied bile pigments and their production outside the liver by way of bile fistulas at the Hooper Foundation at UC San Francisco. His interests soon extended to understanding the production of hemoglobin to gain a better understand of how it is metabolized into bile pigments. Co-authored with Hooper, Whipple published 12 papers, from 1915 to 1917, reporting the following:

- Bile pigment bilirubin was a breakdown product of muscle hemoglobin, though red blood cell hemoglobin was the major normal source.
- Bile pigment was not reabsorbed and reused in the production of new red blood cells.
- The heme moiety of hemoglobin could be converted to bilirubin in both the pleural and peritoneal cavities, in addition to the liver.
- Normal liver function was essential for the excretion of bilirubin.
- The curve of red blood cell regeneration in anemia, as influenced by dietary factors, like sugar, amino acids and starvation.

At the University of Rochester, Whipple's research focus became studying the various factors in diets which contributed to recovery of long-term anemia, particularly in anemic dogs. Along with his research assistant, Frieda Robscheit-Robbins (formally Frieda Robbins), they co-authored 21 publications, from 1925 to 1930, reporting the following:

- Circulating plasma and hemoglobin volumes
- The effects of dietary and other factors on bile salt production and secretion
- Measurements of blood fibrinogen
- The effects of diet, hemorrhage, liver injury, and other factors on plasma fibrinogen levels
- Blood regeneration following simple anemia

Whipple and Robscheit-Robbins were regarded as having one of the "great creative partnerships in medicine".

In his landmark studies, published as a series "Blood Regeneration in Severe Anemia" beginning in 1925, Whipple demonstrated that raw liver fed to anemic dogs was the most effective diet additive for reversing the anemia by boosting the production of red blood cells. He would go on to show that foods derived from animal tissue, and cooked apricots also had a positive effect of increasing red blood cells during anemia. Based on these data, Whipple associated the iron content in these dietary factors to the potency of red blood cell regeneration. This data led directly to successful liver treatment of pernicious anemia by George R. Minot and William P. Murphy, despite the main therapeutic mechanism being through B12 rather than iron. This was a remarkable discovery since previously, pernicious anemia was invariably fatal at a young age. For his contribution to this body of work, he was jointly awarded the Nobel Prize in physiology or medicine in 1934 along with Minot and Murphy.

In 1937, Whipple collaborated with William B. Hawkins to determine the life-span of the red blood cell in dogs. Simultaneously, with the advent of radioactive iron, Whipple, Paul F. Hahn, and William F. Bale collaborated to study iron absorption and utilization. They demonstrated that iron absorption was highly regulated in the small intestine and was influenced by the amount of iron stores in the body. They also demonstrated that insignificant amounts of iron were normally excreted or lost in the urine, feces, or bile. During this time, Whipple also formulated his theory on "the dynamic equilibrium between blood and tissue proteins" based on earlier plasmapheresis experiments he had performed (in the early 1930s) which demonstrated the importance of dietary protein on production of plasma proteins. This formed the foundation of research into mammalian protein metabolism, and led Rudolf Schoenheimer to write The Dynamic State of the Body Constituents, marking the modern era of biochemistry and biology.

Between 1939 and 1943 Leon L. Miller and Whipple collaborated to study the hepato-toxic effects of chloroform anesthesia on dogs. They found that dogs in a protein depleted state sustained lethal liver injury from within anesthesia fifteen minutes; but that feeding these depleted dogs a protein rich meal, particularly rich in L-methionine or L-cystine, prior to anesthesia was protective. This and other studies, led Whipple to the conclusion that S-containing amino acids are protective against liver toxic agents.

During World War II, Whipple tested combinations of dietary amino acids, administered, orally or parenterally, and their effects on plasma protein synthesis. He was able to characterize amino acid mixtures that could satisfy the metabolic requirements necessary to maintain weight, nitrogen balance, and plasma protein and hemoglobin regeneration in the dog. This would ultimately led to human clinical trials which demonstrated that these amino acid mixtures, along with enzymatic digest of casein, could sustain nourishment in patients who could not intake nutrients through the normal gastrointestinal route for extended periods. Intravenous nutrition, referred to as parenteral nutrition, is routinely used today.

== Nobel Prize, honors and distinctions ==
Whipple shared the Nobel Prize in Physiology or Medicine in 1934 with George R. Minot and William P. Murphy "for their discoveries concerning liver therapy in cases of anemia". This was the discovery that feeding humans raw liver can function as a treatment for pernicious anemia.

In presenting the Nobel Prize, Professor I. Holmgren of the Nobel committee observed that "Of the three prize winners, it was Whipple who first occupied himself with the investigations for which the prize is now awarded. ... Whipple's experiments were planned exceedingly well, and carried out very accurately, and consequently their results can lay claim to absolute reliability. These investigations and results of Whipple's gave Minot and Murphy the idea that an experiment could be made to see whether favorable results might also be obtained in the case of pernicious anemia...by making use of the foods of the kind that Whipple had found to yield favorable results in his experiments regarding anemia from loss of blood."

Whipple received honorary doctorates from several American and international Universities, including the Universities of Athens and Glasgow. In 1930, along with Minot, he received the Popular Science Monthly Gold Medal and Annual Award. In 1934, he was awarded the William Wood Gerhard Gold Medal of the Pathological Society of Philadelphia.

He also was a member of the following organizations:

- Rockefeller Foundation, Trustee
- Association of Physicians in Vienna, Corresponding Member
- Royal Society of Physicians in Budapest
- European Society of Haematology
- British Medical Association, Foreign Corresponding Member.
- Pathological Society of Great Britain and Ireland, Honorary Member
- American Philosophical Society, Honorary Member
- Society of Experimental Biology and Medicine, Honorary Member
- Board of Scientific Directors of the Rockefeller Institute, Member
- Board of Trustees of the Rockefeller Institute, Member; Vice-chairman; and Trustee Emeritus

== See also ==
- Whipple House (Ashland, New Hampshire), his birthplace
- New Hampshire Historical Marker No. 100: George Hoyt Whipple
