= Patricia D'Amore =

American ophthalmologist

- Citizenship: American
- Education: Regis College (B.A), 1973; Boston University (Ph.D.), 1977; Northeastern University (MBA), 1987; Harvard Law School (Program on Negotiation), 2011
- Known for: angiogenesis
- Scientific career
- Workplaces: Harvard Medical School; Howe Laboratory

Patricia Ann D'Amore is a professor at Harvard Medical School, where she is the Charles L. Schepens Professor of Ophthalmology, and Professor of Pathology.

== Early life and career ==
D'Amore grew up in Everett, Massachusetts and graduated from Matignon High School in Cambridge. After a 1973 BA at Regis College (Massachusetts), she received a PhD in biology at Boston University in 1977 under the direction David Shepro.

She then became a postdoctoral fellow in Physiological Chemistry and Ophthalmology at Johns Hopkins Medical School, and became Assistant Professor of Ophthalmology there in 1980. In 1981 she moved to the Surgical Research Lab at Boston Children's Hospital and joined the Harvard Medical School faculty as Assistant Professor of Surgery.

She was appointed Associate Professor at Harvard in 1989, and full professor in 1998. In 2012 she was appointed Charles L. Schepens Professor of Ophthalmology, and in 2013, Professor of Pathology. She has been the Director of the Howe Laboratory at Massachusetts Eye and Ear since 2014, and its Associate Chief of Basic and Translational Research since 2014.

She also obtained an MBA from Northeastern University (1987).

=== Research ===
Her research focuses on the pathogenesis of eye disease, in particular in angiogenesis, and in the contribution of lipids and inflammation to the development of age related macular degeneration. She is one of a group of scientists that discovered the importance of Vascular endothelial growth factor (VEGF) in rapidly developing "wet" Macular Degeneration, which led to anti-VEGF therapy, which is widely used in western countries to slow down disease progression.

D'Amore's research group has authored over 150 original research papers. She is highly cited, with 4 papers cited more than 1000 times.

She is the founder of the Boston Angiogenesis Meeting, which started its annual meetings in 1998. She is the Editor-in-Chief of the journal Microvascular Research, and has been an associate editor of The American Journal of Pathology. She has also been on the editorial board of FASEB Journal.

== Awards and honors ==
- 1994: The Alcon Research Award and the Cogan Award
- 2004: Elected to The Academy at Harvard Medical School
- 2006: Senior Scientific Investigator Award from Research to Prevent Blindness
- 2009: Appointed an Association for Research in Vision and Ophthalmology (ARVO) Fellow
- 2010: Invited lecturer for the 5th Annual Jeffrey M. Isner, M.D. Endowed Memorial Lectureship
- 2012: Rous-Whipple Award from the American Society of Investigative Pathology
- 2013: Everett Mendelsohn Excellence in Mentoring Award from Harvard University
- 2013: Invited lecturer for the Hans Vilbertn Lecture, University of Regensburg, Germany
- 2013: Women Physicians Sector Mentorship Award from the American Medical Association
- 2014: Endre Balazs Prize from the International Society for Eye Research
- 2014: António Champalimaud Award
- 2015: Proctor Medal from the Association For Research & Vision Ophthalmology
- 2018: Fellow of the American Academy of Arts and Sciences
