= Michalopoulos =

Michalopoulos (Greek: Μιχαλόπουλος) is a Greek surname. Notable people with the surname include:

- Andreas Michalopoulos (born 1949), Greek footballer
- Athanasios Michalopoulos (born 1973), Greek beach volleyball player
- George Michalopoulos, Greek-American pathologist
- Giannis Michalopoulos (1927–2016), Greek actor
- Ilias Michalopoulos (born 1985), Greek footballer
- Panos Michalopoulos (born 1949), Greek actor
- Tom Michalopoulos (1950–2021), Greek-born Canadian entrepreneur
