= American Society for Investigative Pathology =

The American Society for Investigative Pathology (ASIP) is a society of biomedical scientists who investigate mechanisms of disease. ASIP membership includes scientists in the academic, government, hospital, and pharmaceutical arenas that focus their research on the pathogenesis, classification, diagnosis and manifestations of disease. Research findings are ultimately used in the understanding, diagnosis and treatment of human diseases. The word pathology is derived from the Greek word "pathos" meaning "disease."

ASIP traces its earliest beginnings to the Boston Society of Medical Sciences that was begun in 1869 by a group of faculty from Harvard Medical School. In 1901 the American Association of Pathologists and Bacteriologists (AAPB) was established. In 1976 the AAPB and the American Society for Experimental Pathology (ASEP) joined to form the American Association of Pathologists (AAP), which in 1992 became ASIP.

ASIP is a member of the Federation of American Societies for Experimental Biology (FASEB), a coalition of 27 independent societies that includes over 125,000 biomedical scientists from around the world. FASEB plays an active role in lobbying for the interests of its constituents. It is a charter member of the Intersociety Council for Pathology Information.

The oldest award and most meritorious award of this society is the "gold-headed cane award", which was first granted in 1919 to Harold C. Ernst. It is presented each year at the annual meeting of the ASIP.

== Scientific Interest Groups ==
Scientific Interest Groups (SIGs) represent the specialty interests of the membership, and include Biobanking, Breast Cancer, Cell Injury, Digital and Computational Pathology, Environmental and Toxicologic Pathology, Gene Expression, Immunohistochemistry and Microscopy, Inflammation/Immunopathology, Informatics, Liver Pathobiology, Molecular Diagnostic Pathology, Neoplasia/Growth Regulation, Neuropathology, Pulmonary Pathobiology, Regenerative Medicine and Stem Cells, Tumor Microenvironment and Metastasis, Vascular and Mucosal Pathobiology, and Veterinary Pathology

== Publications ==
The American Journal of Pathology (AJP), official journal of the American Society for Investigative Pathology, publishes articles on the cellular and molecular biology of disease.

The Journal of Molecular Diagnostics (JMD), co-owned by the American Society for Investigative Pathology and the Association for Molecular Pathology, publishes articles on scientific advances in the translation and validation of molecular discoveries in medicine into the clinical diagnostic setting, and the description and application of technological advances in the field of molecular diagnostic medicine.

== Scientific meetings ==
The ASIP Annual Meeting at Experimental Biology features current topics in disease pathogenesis, including both mechanistic and translational aspects of pathology research. Programming includes several major symposia, workshops, educational sessions, award lectures, and other special sessions that feature nationally and internationally recognized investigators and speakers. Various aspects of professional growth and advancement are presented in career development workshops that specifically address the needs of MD, MD/PhD, PhD, and other trainees. Additional sessions are programmed from abstract submissions to the ASIP topic categories covering a wide variety of subjects related to pathogenesis research.

The Pathobiology for Investigators, Students, and Academicians (PISA) Meeting features lectures and acts as a forum for scientific pathological discussion.

== Current president ==
Satdarshan P. Monga

== Past presidents ==
- 2023 Robinna Lorenz
- 2022 William A. Muller
- 2021 Patricia D'Amore
- 2020 Richard N. Mitchell
- 2019 Dani Zander
- 2018 Asma Nusrat
- 2017 Daniel Remick
- 2016 George Michalopoulos
- 2015 William B. Coleman
- 2014 Kevin A Roth
- 2013 James M. Musser
- 2012 Elizabeth R. Unger
- 2011 Martha Furie
- 2010 Chuck Parkos
- 2009 Stanley Cohen
- 2008 Linda M. McManus
- 2007 Mark L. Tykocinski
- 2006 Peter M. Howley
- 2005 Stephen J. Galli
- 2004 Nelson Fausto
- 2003 Abul K. Abbas
- 2002 Fred P. Sanfilippo
- 2001 Avrum I. Gotlieb
- 2000 Tucker Collins
- 1999 Mark E. Sobel
- 1998 Vinay Kumar
- 1997 Harold F. Dvorak
- 1996 D. G. Kaufman
- 1995 R. G. Lynch
- 1994 R. Ross
- 1993 M. W. Lieberman
- 1992 Michael A. Gimbrone, Jr.
- 1991 M. E. Lamm
- 1990 D. F. Bainton
- 1989 T. S. Edgington
- 1988 Emil R. Unanue
- 1987 D. Korn
- 1986 Ramzi Cotran
- 1985 C. G. Becker
- 1984 J. W. Grisham
- 1983 P. E. Lacy
- 1982 D. G. Scarpelli
- 1981 Vincent T. Marchesi
- 1980 Frederick F. Becker
- 1979 Peter A. Ward
- 1978 R.E. Anderson, and M.J. Karnovsky
- 1977 G.B. Pierce
- 1976 R.B. Hill, Jr. and H.C. Pitot
- 1951 Frieda Robscheit-Robbins
- 1921 Frederick George Novy
