= Ashland station (New Hampshire) =

- Ashland Railroad Station
- U.S. National Register of Historic Places
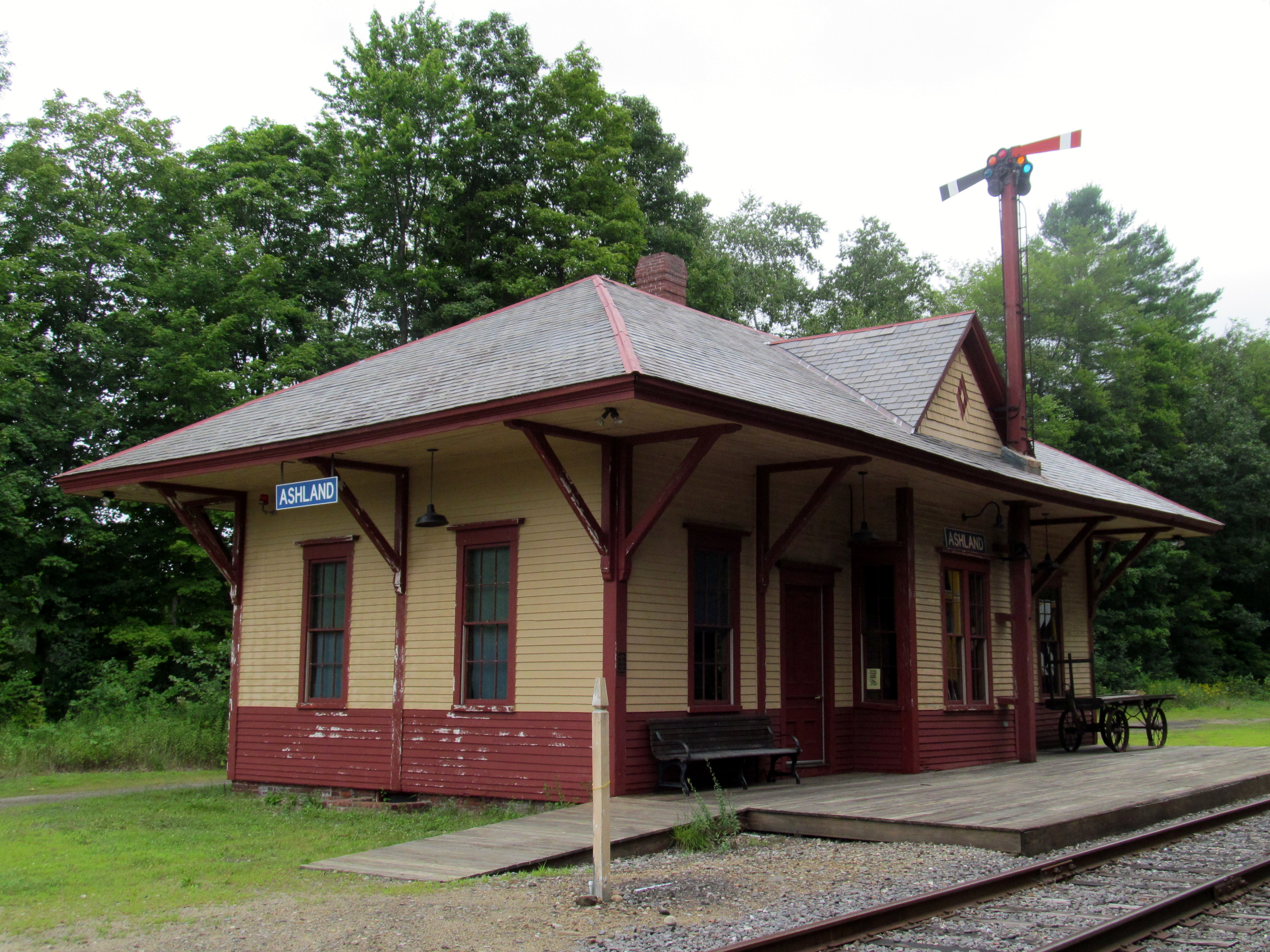

- Location within New Hampshire Location within the United States
- Location: 39 Depot St., Ashland, New Hampshire
- Coordinates: 43°41′26″N 71°38′4″W
- Area: 1.1 acres (0.45 ha)
- NRHP reference No.: 82000617
- Added to NRHP: November 10, 1982

The Ashland Railroad Station is a historic train station at 39 Depot Street in Ashland, New Hampshire. Built in 1869 and remodeled in 1891, it is a well-preserved example of a rural 19th-century railroad station. It is now a museum operated by the Ashland Historical Society. The station was listed on the National Register of Historic Places in 1982.

== Description and history ==
The former Ashland Railroad Station is located south of the commercial center of the village of Ashland, on the south side of Depot Street at its junction with Winter Street. Depot Street, running roughly east–west, is crossed by a single-track railroad line on a diagonal from northwest to southeast. The station is located on the northeast side of the track, its long side oriented in parallel to the track. It is a single-story wooden structure, with post-and-beam framing, which is covered by a hipped slate roof. The roof has wide overhangs visually supported by knee braces. The station is basically rectangular, with projecting elements on the long sides near the center. The track side projection houses the station agent's ticket office, while that on the other side houses restrooms.

The rail line was built through Ashland, then part of Holderness and known as Holderness Village, in 1849. The first station built by the Boston, Concord, and Montreal Railroad (BC&M) was used for both passenger and freight traffic. In 1869, the railroad built this station in order to provide passengers a station separate from the freight depot. It was extensively remodeled in 1891 by the BC&M's successor, the Concord & Montreal Railroad, giving it its present appearance. The station was sold into private hands in 1960, and given to the Ashland Historical Society in 1980, which now operates it as a local history museum.

== See also ==
- National Register of Historic Places listings in Grafton County, New Hampshire
