= George Michalopoulos =

Greek-American pathologist

George K. Michalopoulos
- Occupations: Pathologist and academic

Academic background
- Education: MD; PhD., Oncology
- Alma mater: University of Athens; University of Wisconsin

George K. Michalopoulos is a Greek-American pathologist and academic. He served as Maud L. Menten Professor of Experimental Pathology and Chair of the Department of Pathology at the University of Pittsburgh and UPMC from 1991 to 2023.

Michalopoulos is most known for his research in the molecular processes associated with liver regeneration, with a specific focus on the significance of hepatocyte growth factor (HGF) and its receptor (MET), as well as the role of the extracellular matrix. He is the recipient of the American Society for Investigative Pathology Rous Whipple Award in 2009, the 2010 American Liver Foundation Distinguished Scientist Award, and was named as Distinguished Professor by the University of Pittsburgh in 2012.

Michalopoulos is a Fellow of the American Association for the Advancement of Science and the American Association for the Study of Liver Diseases, and an elected member of the Association of American Physicians and the Greek National Academy.

== Education ==
Michalopoulos earned an M.D. at the University of Athens in 1969 and a Ph.D. in Oncology at the University of Wisconsin-Madison School of Medicine and Public Health, where he also completed his residency in anatomic pathology in 1977.

== Career ==
Michalopoulos began his academic career as an Assistant Professor of Pathology at Duke University Medical Center in 1977, and was later appointed to Associate Professor in 1983 and Professor in 1987. He served as Professor and Chairman of the Department of Pathology at the University of Pittsburgh and UPMC from 1991 to 2023, and he remained as Professor of Pathology after he stepped down as Chair of Pathology. He also served as Interim Dean of the School of Medicine from 1995 to 1998.

In 2008, Michalopoulos was appointed Chair of the Board of Scientific Counselors for the National Institute on Alcohol Abuse and Alcoholism at the NIH, and then served as the President of the American Association for Investigative Pathology from 2016 to 2017.

== Research ==
Michalopoulos has contributed to the field of pathology through his work on liver function, regeneration, and carcinogenesis. He has utilized various experimental models, such as hepatocyte cultures, hepatic organoids, established cell lines, studies on liver regeneration after partial hepatectomy, examinations of regeneration through progenitor cell pathways, investigations into liver enlargement induced by chemical mitogens (known as augmentative hepatomegaly), and analyses of liver carcinogenesis using rodent models, along with genomic analysis of human liver cancer.

=== Discovery of hepatocyte growth factor and its receptor ===
Michalopoulos has researched Hepatocyte Growth Factor (HGF) and its receptor HGFR, also known as MET, and their significance for liver regeneration. He used hepatocyte cultures as bioassays and discovered and identified HGF as a circulating mitogen in peripheral blood. He also found that HGF functions as the ligand for the c-MET receptor, with HGF stimulating phosphorylation and kinase activity of the p190c-met protein, documenting the functional interaction between the two. In addition, he observed an early rise in plasma HGF after partial hepatectomy, derived from release of HGF from hepatic extracellular matrix mediated by urokinase activation and coinciding with liver regeneration signals. These studies documented the fundamental role of plasma hepatocyte growth factor and norepinephrine in fostering liver regeneration.

Michalopoulos, together with Liu and Zarnegar, also identified and characterized the mouse hepatocyte growth factor (HGF) gene, revealing its homology with other kringle-containing proteins and indicating its likely evolution through gene duplication and exon shuffling, with significant conservation among various vertebrate species.

=== Early signaling pathways triggering liver regeneration ===
Michalopoulos studied early signaling pathways triggering liver regeneration. In 1999, he identified EGFR and MET as the sole two mitogenic receptor tyrosine kinases linked to hepatocyte proliferative signals, showing their early activation during the regenerative process and the vital role they play in these regenerative events. Additionally, he highlighted the significance of the alpha-1 adrenergic receptor in amplifying regenerative signals, the near-instant activation of urokinase, which initiates a sequence of matrix remodeling, along with the release and activation of HGF in both liver and peripheral blood. Furthermore, his research revealed the early activation of Notch and Wnt/beta catenin signaling shortly after hepatectomy. The importance of EGFR and MET for control of liver regeneration was demonstrated when combined inhibition of the two receptors resulted in complete arrest of liver regeneration, followed by death of mice.

=== Mechanisms of termination of liver regeneration ===
Michalopoulos investigated mechanisms of termination of liver regeneration. He and his colleagues researched the liver's original liver-to-body weight ratio following the regeneration process, coining the term "hepatostat". He showed that mechanisms governing the termination of liver regeneration, involving integrin-linked kinase (ILK) and pericellular proteins like Glypican 3 (GPC3), are highly complex, and the disruption of these pathways influences the regenerative outcome and final liver weight. The elimination of ILK leads to excessive regeneration, while over-expression of GPC3 results in defective regeneration, as both GPC3 and ILK regulate growth suppressor signaling pathways, which are often disrupted in liver cancer. Additionally, he found that GPC3 exerts its influence by binding to and inhibiting CD81, the entry point for Hepatitis C virus, and interacts with Sonic Hedgehog, a signaling protein that triggers non-parenchymal cell growth. He also determined that the interaction between HCV, GPC3, and CD81 activates the Hippo pathway via Ezrin phosphorylation and diminishes nuclear Yap.

Michalopoulos' contributions in studies of liver regeneration were acknowledged in a bibliometric analysis.

=== Transdifferentiation of hepatocytes and biliary cells in liver repair ===
Michalopoulos researched transdifferentiation of hepatocytes and biliary cells in liver repair. In a collaborative study, he demonstrated that the cells with "hepatocyte progenitor" phenotypes which mature into hepatocytes when the proliferation of hepatocytes is impeded during the process of regeneration, originate from the biliary compartment. Subsequently, he showed that the reverse pathway is also present in both humans and rodents, as when the biliary compartment sustains damage, the adjacent periportal hepatocytes trans-differentiate into biliary cells, which is a process influenced by the signaling of the MET and EGFR receptors. In 2018, his research work determined that both of these transdifferentiation processes are active in the human liver during chronic liver disease and acute liver failure.

=== Genomic alterations and signaling pathways in hepatocellular carcinoma ===
Michalopoulos and Luo explored genomic alterations and associated signaling pathways in human hepatocellular carcinoma. In a joint study, he investigated genetic changes and associated pathways in liver cancer, analyzing gene copy number variations in 98 cases of hepatocellular carcinoma (HCC). They identified Leucocyte Specific Protein 1 (LSP1) as the most commonly affected gene, impacting the RAF-MEK-ERK signaling pathway and liver regeneration termination, and also highlighted the significance of PTPRD in deactivating STAT3 and Rsu-1 as a Ras signaling suppressor gene with deletions in some HCC cases.

Michalopoulos and colleagues looked into the functional significance of leukocyte-specific protein-1 (LSP1) in liver cancer, showing that loss of LSP1 expression enhances proliferation and migration in hepatoma cells. He also investigated the role of LSP1 in liver regeneration and sensitivity to sorafenib, highlighting that loss of LSP1 function increases sensitivity to sorafenib treatment and promotes hepatocellular proliferation. Furthermore, he examined the role of glypican-3 (GPC3) in hepatocellular carcinomas (HCCs), revealing its association with CD81 and its role in the activation of the Hippo pathway, with implications for HCV infection and hepatic neoplasia promotion. His studies demonstrated that more than 70% of HCC do not express the CD81 protein, thus allowing Yap to increase in HCC. GPC3 itself is regulated by Yap, thus explaining the high rise of GPC3 in HCC in the absence of CD81.

=== Role of the Epidermal Growth Factor Receptor (EGFR) in regulation of Metabolism Associated Steatotic Liver Disease (MASLD) ===
Michalopoulos investigated the role of the Epidermal Growth Factor Receptor (EGFR) in regulation of Metabolism Associated Steatotic Liver Disease (MASLD). Hepatic steatosis, due to alcohol or nutritional imbalance, is associated with deposition of lipids in hepatocytes, and the proportions of affected hepatocytes vary, but uncontrolled increase leads to liver inflammation and potentially to HCC. In a collaborative study with Bhushan, he demonstrated that chemical inhibitors of EGFR already used in human pharmacology eliminate the lipid accumulation in hepatocytes.

== Awards and honors ==
- 2009 – Rous Whipple Award, American Society for Investigative Pathology
- 2010 – Distinguished Scientist Award, American Liver Foundation
- 2012 – Distinguished Science Professor, University of Pittsburgh
- 2013 – Honorary Doctorate Degree, University of Athens
- 2021 – Corresponding Member, Greek National Academy

== Selected articles ==
- Michalopoulos, G., & Pitot, H. C. (1975). Primary culture of parenchymal liver cells on collagen membranes: morphological and biochemical observations. Experimental cell research, 94(1), 70-78.
- Naldini, L., Vigna, E., Narsimhan, R. P., Gaudino, G., Zarnegar, R., Michalopoulos, G. K., & Comoglio, P. M. (1991). Hepatocyte growth factor (HGF) stimulates the tyrosine kinase activity of the receptor encoded by the proto-oncogene c-MET. Oncogene, 6(4), 501-504.
- Michalopoulos, G. K. (1990). Liver regeneration: molecular mechanisms of growth control. Artificial Liver Support: Concepts, Methods, Results, 72-93.
- Michalopoulos, G. K. (2007). Liver regeneration. Journal of cellular physiology, 213(2), 286-300.
- Michalopoulos, G. K. (2020). Liver regeneration. The liver: biology and pathobiology, 566-584.
- Michalopoulos, G.K., & Bhushan, B. (2021). Liver regeneration: biological and pathological mechanisms and implications. Nature Review of Gastroenterology and Hepatology, Jan;18(1):40-55.
