= Phipps Institute for the Study, Treatment and Prevention of Tuberculosis =

The Phipps Institute for the Study, Treatment and Prevention of Tuberculosis at the University of Pennsylvania was established in 1903 with a grant from Henry Phipps, a former business partner of Andrew Carnegie. Dr. Esmond R. Long was the director of the institute from 1935 until his retirement in 1955.
