= Little Squam Lake =

Lake in the U.S. state of New Hampshire

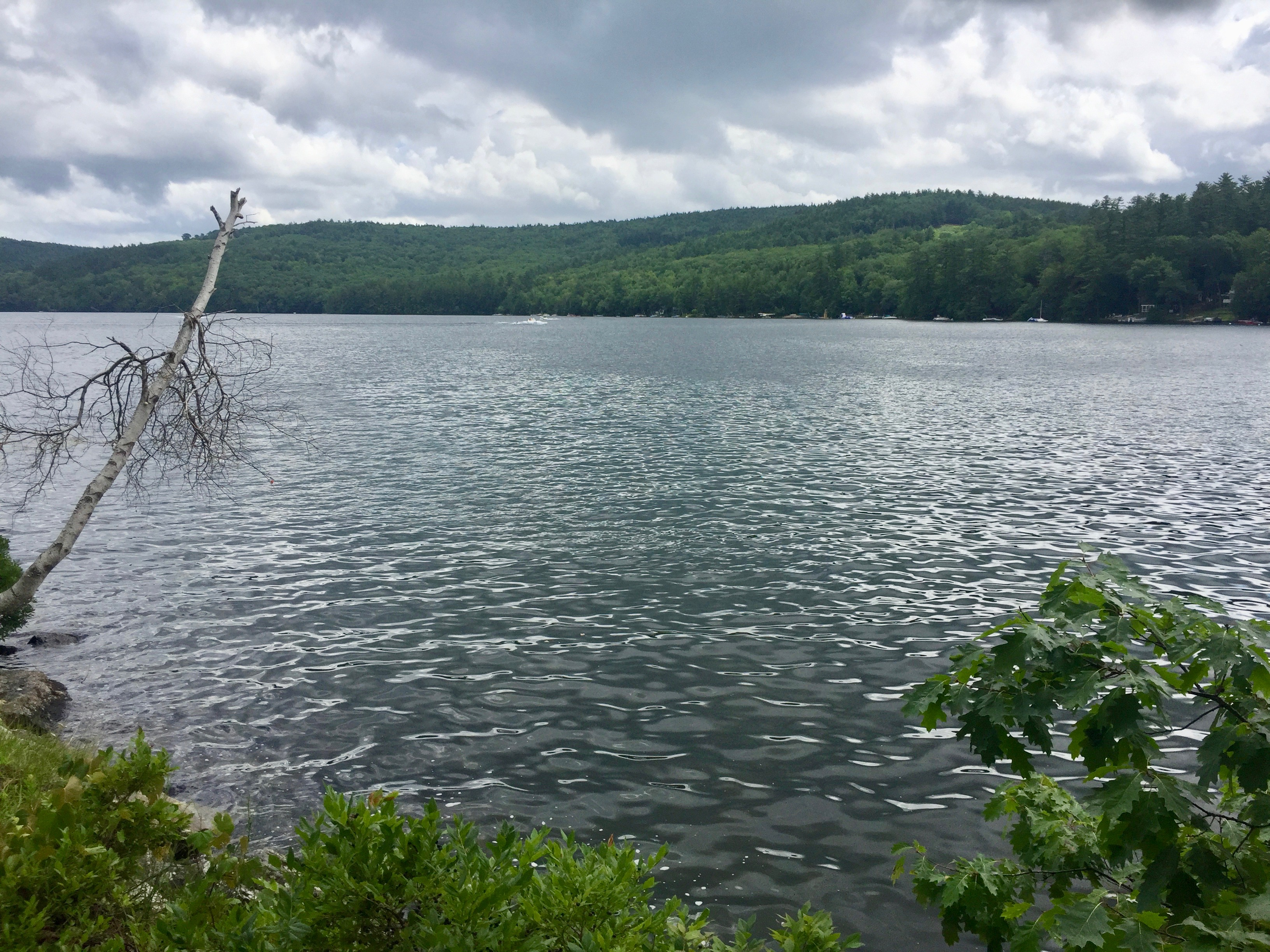
- Little Squam from US 3 in Ashland, NH, 2018

- Location within New Hampshire
- Location: Grafton County, New Hampshire
- Coordinates: 43°43′20″N 71°35′59″W
- Primary inflows: Squam Lake
- Primary outflows: Squam River
- Basin countries: United States
- Max. length: 2.0 mi (3.2 km)
- Max. width: 0.5 mi (0.80 km)
- Surface area: 408 acres (1.65 km^{2})
- Surface elevation: 570 ft (170 m)
- Settlements: Holderness; Ashland

Little Squam Lake is a 408-acre (1.65 km^{2}) water body located in Grafton County in the Lakes Region of central New Hampshire, United States, in the towns of Holderness and Ashland. The lake connects upstream via a short channel to Squam Lake in Holderness. The two lakes are maintained at a common water level by a dam located one mile downstream from the outlet of Little Squam Lake, on the Squam River, a tributary of the Pemigewasset River.

== Gallery ==
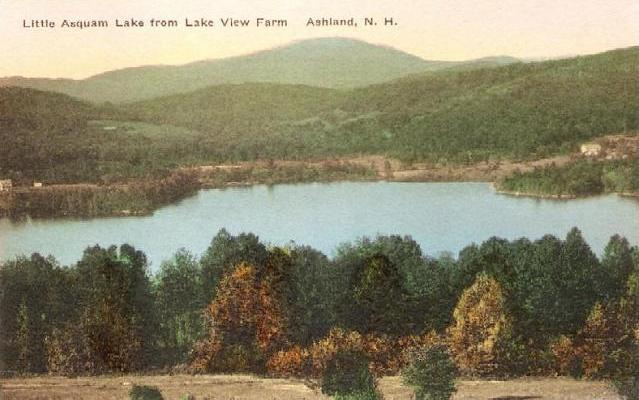
Postcard from c.1922

== See also ==
- List of lakes in New Hampshire
