= Zoi-Heleni Michalopoulou =

Greek and American applied mathematician, acoustical engineer, and oceanographer

Zoi-Heleni "Eliza" Michalopoulou is a Greek and American applied mathematician, acoustical engineer, and oceanographer whose research concerns geoacoustic inversion, the inverse problems that arise in understanding the properties of seabeds from the way sound travels through them. She is a distinguished professor and chair of the Department of Mathematical Sciences at the New Jersey Institute of Technology.

== Education and career ==
Michalopoulou is originally from Athens. After high school at Pierce College in the American College of Greece, she studied electrical engineering at the National Technical University of Athens, receiving a diploma in 1988. She continued her studies in electrical engineering at Duke University, where she received a master's degree in 1990 and completed her Ph.D. in 1993, under the supervision of Dimitri Alexandrou.

On completing her doctorate, she joined the New Jersey Institute of Technology as a postdoctoral fellow and research assistant professor, and soon afterward was hired to a regular-rank assistant professorship.

== Recognition ==
Michalopoulou was elected as a Fellow of the Acoustical Society of America in 2002, "for contributions to signal processing and mathematical analysis of ocean data". She became a distinguished lecturer of the IEEE Oceanic Engineering Society in 2022.

She was the 2025 recipient of the New Jersey Institute of Technology Excellence in Research award.
