= John H. Long (chemist) =

American chemist (1856–1918)

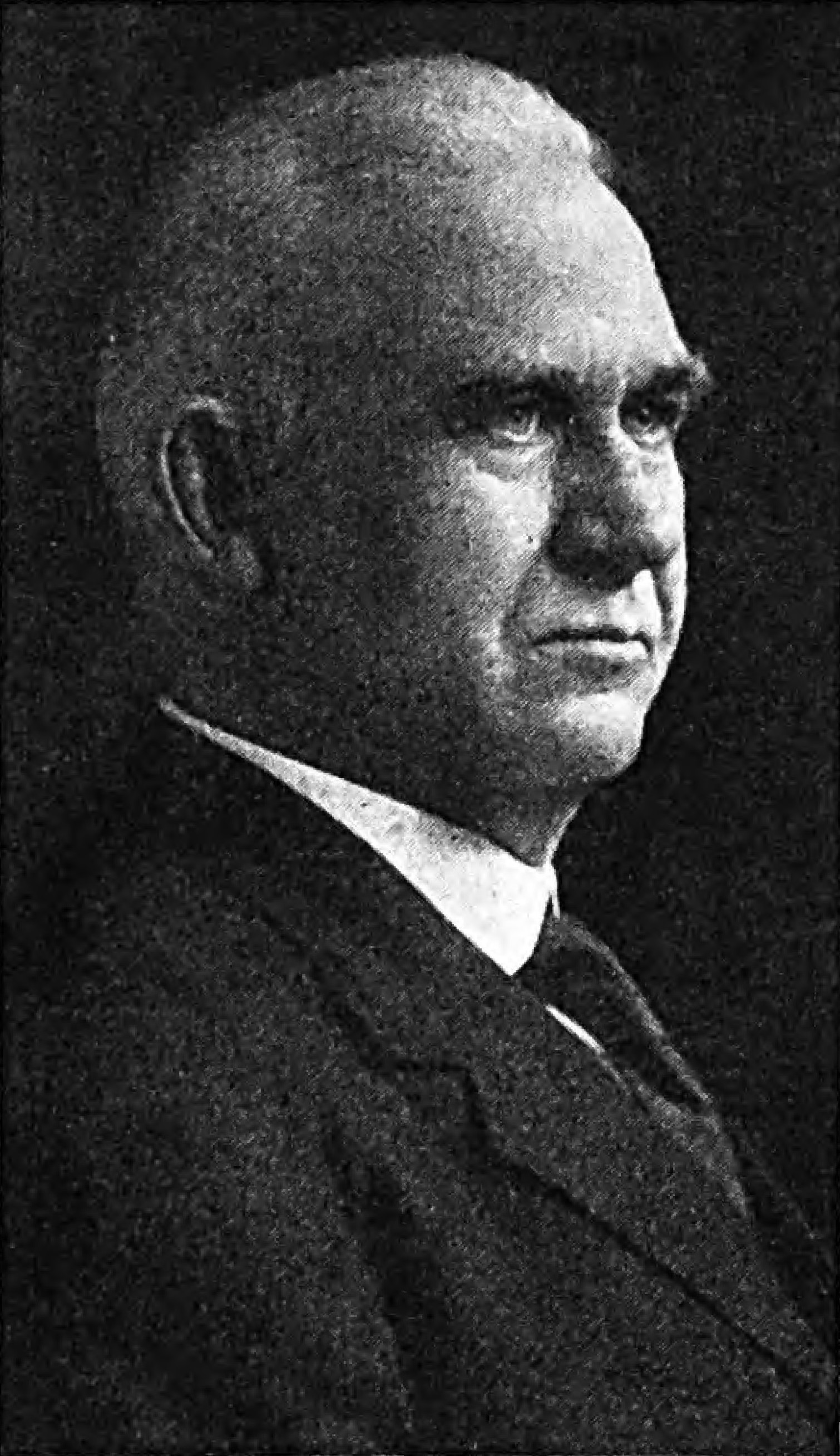
Professor John H. Long

John Harper Long (26 December 1856 – 14 June 1918) was the president of the American Chemical Society in 1903. He was a professor of chemistry at the Northwestern University School of Medicine.

== Biography ==
Long was born in Steubenville, Ohio on 26 December 1856. After the death of his parents, he went to live with an uncle in Olathe, Kansas. Long entered the University of Kansas (KU) in 1873, graduating with a B.S. degree in 1877, making him the first chemistry graduate of KU. He then went to the University of Tübingen to study under Lothar Meyer, earning an Sc.D. degree in 1879. Long also studied in Würzburg and Breslau before returning to the United States in 1880.

In 1881, Long joined the faculty of Northwestern University. In 1885, he also became a chemist for the Illinois State Board of Health. In 1895, Long was named a fellow of the American Association for the Advancement of Science. He was the author of several chemistry textbooks and also translated a German organic chemistry text into English.

== Personal ==
Long was the son of John Long and Elizabeth (Harper) Long.

On 24 August 1885, Long married Catherine Stoneman.

Long died at his home in Evanston, Illinois on 14 June 1918.
