= Kenneth Brinkhous =

American physician

Kenneth Merle Brinkhous
- Born: May 29, 1908; Iowa
- Died: December 11, 2000 (aged 92); Chapel Hill, NC
- Citizenship: US
- Education: University of Iowa
- Known for: Research in Pathology & Hematology
- Scientific career
- Fields: Medicine & Pathology

Kenneth Merle Brinkhous (1908–2000) was a professor and chairperson in the Department of Pathology and Laboratory Medicine at the University of North Carolina at Chapel Hill. Brinkhous remained active in research until shortly before his death.

== Education ==
Brinkhous graduated from the University of Iowa Medical School with an M.D. in 1932 and trained in the specialty of pathology there. His mentor, Dr. Harry P. Smith, led a training program that combined clinical aspects of pathology and laboratory research, the latter focusing on aspects of blood coagulation. While in Iowa, Dr. Brinkhous carried out research on hemophilia as part of a research team that included several other physicians interested in coagulation. Brinkhous made the seminal discovery of antihemophilic factor (Factor VIII) and showed that it was lacking in hemophiliac patients.

His research in Iowa was disrupted by World War II. During that conflict, Dr. Brinkhous commanded an Army laboratory in Australia, which served as a reference facility for the U. S. military forces in the South Pacific. After the war he returned to Iowa, but did not remain there long.

== Career at the University of North Carolina ==
In 1946, Brinkhous accepted the chairmanship of pathology at the University of North Carolina (UNC), and held that position until 1973. During his tenure, the department evolved from a two-faculty section, without a strong research presence, into a widely recognized research department. Brinkhous also developed a high quality of teaching and clinical service. He had a leading role in planning and implementing the pathology laboratories for the North Carolina Memorial Hospital that opened in 1952. Brinkhous was influential in the development and staffing of an expanded medical school faculty at UNC, especially in its clinical departments. His philosophy was that excellent teaching and clinical service required associated research programs of high quality.

Brinkhous developed a coagulation research program at UNC, which stressed team efforts between researchers who worked in concert but from different perspectives. Throughout his career, Dr. Brinkhous recruited local students to research, many of whom became renowned scientists in their own right. He was an outstanding mentor, who combined friendship and personal concern with a demand for persistent, intense effort. Contributions made by coagulationists at UNC included the demonstration that hemophilia could be controlled by administering plasma containing Factor VIII, and the development of methods to purify and concentrate Factor VIII for use as a therapeutic agent. The partial thromboplastin test was also developed, as now used in hospital laboratories around the world. The team also investigated Von Willebrand disease, and studied the effects of snake venom on blood clotting. That work led to the use of proteases in treating victims of vascular thrombosis.

== Awards and honors ==
Kenneth Brinkhous earned many honors, including honorary doctoral degrees from UNC and the University of Chicago; the O. Max Gardner Award of the UNC Board of Governors; election to the American Academy of Arts and Sciences and to the National Academy of Sciences; and the Gold-Headed Cane Award from the American Society of Pathologists, an organization he had served as President. In 1997 he received recognition from the National Institutes of Health for the longest continuous extramural grant award (1947–1997).

He was the professor and chairman of pathology for UNC from 1946 to 1973, and he was appointed Alumni Distinguished Professor of Pathology in 1961. Brinkhous was affiliated with a long list of organizations that included the American Medical Association (president from 1955 to 1956), the Universities Associated for Research and Education in Pathology (president in 1964), the American Society for Experimental Pathology (president from 1965 to 1966), the Federation of American Societies for Experimental Biology (president from 1966 to 1967), and the American Association of Pathologists and Bacteriologists (president from 1973 to 1974). He was the recipient of the Ward Burdick Award from the American Society of Clinical Pathologists in 1941 and 1963, the Murray Thelin Award from the National Hemophilia Foundation in 1972, and among several others, the Gold-Headed Cane Award from the American Society for Investigative Pathologists in 1981. He was the professor and chairman of pathology for UNC from 1946 to 1973, and he was appointed Alumni Distinguished Professor of Pathology in 1961. Brinkhous was affiliated with a long list of organizations that included the American Medical Association (president from 1955 to 1956), the Universities Associated for Research and Education in Pathology (president in 1964), the American Society for Experimental Pathology (president from 1965 to 1966), the Federation of American Societies for Experimental Biology (president from 1966 to 1967), and the American Association of Pathologists and Bacteriologists (president from 1973 to 1974). He was the recipient of the Ward Burdick Award from the American Society of Clinical Pathologists in 1941 and 1963, the Murray Thelin Award from the National Hemophilia Foundation in 1972, and among several others, the Gold-Headed Cane Award from the American Society for Investigative Pathologists in 1981.

== Personal life ==
Brinkhous was married for 64 years to his wife, Frances. They had 2 sons, one of whom predeceased his father.
