= The American Journal of Pathology =

- Discipline: Pathology
- Language: English
- Edited by: Martha Furie

Publication details
- Former names: Journal of the Boston Society of Medical Sciences, The Journal of Medical Research
- History: 1896–present
- Publisher: Elsevier on behalf of the American Society for Investigative Pathology (United States)
- Frequency: Monthly
- Open access: Delayed, after 1 year
- Impact factor: 6.0 (2022)

Standard abbreviations
- ISO 4: Am. J. Pathol.

Indexing
- CODEN: AJPAA4
- ISSN: 0002-9440 (print); 1525-2191 (web)
- LCCN: 27010042
- OCLC no.: 1479398

Links
- Journal homepage; Online access; Online archive at PubMed Central; Journal page at publisher's website

The American Journal of Pathology is a monthly peer-reviewed medical journal covering pathology. It is published by Elsevier on behalf of the American Society for Investigative Pathology, of which it is an official journal. The editor-in-chief is Martha B. Furie (Stony Brook University). The journal was established in 1896 as the Journal of the Boston Society of Medical Sciences and renamed The Journal of Medical Research in 1901, before obtaining its current title in 1925. According to the Journal Citation Reports, the journal has a 2022 impact factor of 6.0.

== Editors ==
The following persons have been editors-in-chief of the journal:

- 1925-1940: Frank Burr Mallory
- 1940-1956: Carl V. Weller
- 1957-1957: Ernest W. Goodpasture (interim Editor-in-Chief, February to October, after the passing of Carl Weller)
- 1957-1967: Edward A. Gall
- 1967-1977: Thomas D. Kinney
- 1977-1978: Donald B. Hackel
- 1982-1992: Vincent T. Marchesi
- 1992-2000: Nelson Fausto
- 2000-2003: James L. Madara
- 2003-2008: Jay M. McDonald
- 2008-2012: Michael P. Lisanti
- 2012-2017: Kevin A Roth
- 2018-2027: Martha B. Furie
