= Squam River =

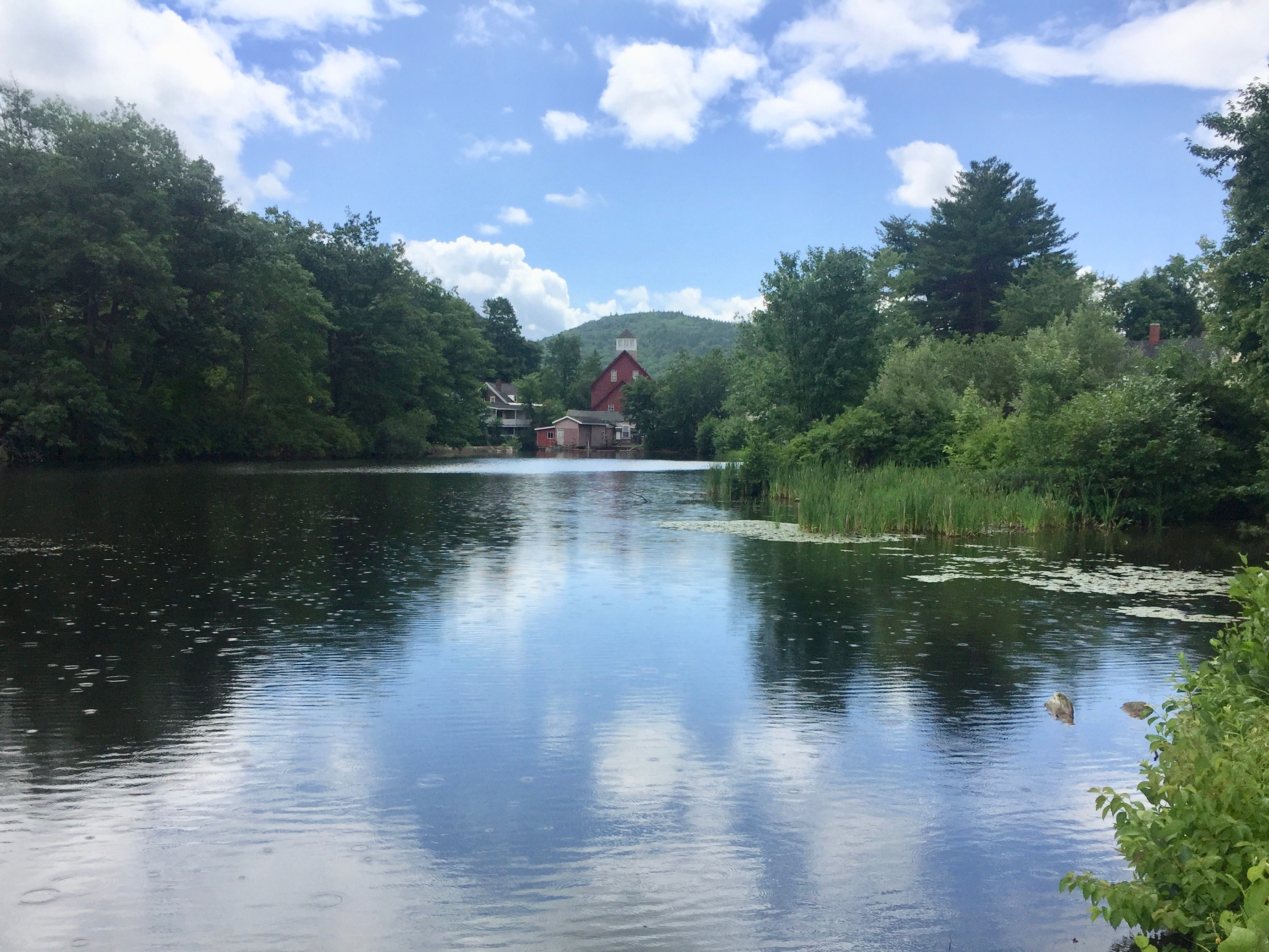
- The Squam River approaching the mill in Ashland, NH

- Location within New Hampshire Location within the United States

Location
- Country: United States
- State: New Hampshire
- Counties: Grafton, Belknap
- Towns: Ashland, New Hampton

Physical characteristics
- Source: Little Squam Lake
  - location: Ashland
  - coordinates: 43°43′7″N 71°37′7″W
  - elevation: 570 ft (170 m)
- Mouth: Pemigewasset River
  - location: New Hampton
  - coordinates: 43°40′59″N 71°38′54″W
  - elevation: 450 ft (140 m)
- Length: 3.6 mi (5.8 km)

Basin features
- Tributaries
  - left: Ames Brook
  - right: Owl Brook

The Squam River is a 3.6-mile-long (5.8 km) river located in central New Hampshire in the United States. The river is the outlet of Squam Lake, the second-largest lake in New Hampshire, and it is a tributary of the Pemigewasset River, which itself is a tributary of the Merrimack River.

The Squam River first appears as a narrow channel in Holderness, New Hampshire, between Squam Lake and Little Squam Lake downstream. The two lakes have the same elevation, due to a dam below the outlet to Little Squam, so the river in Holderness village is not free-flowing. Below Little Squam Lake the river proceeds south for over a mile before reaching the dam which controls the two lakes' water level. Below this point, the river quickly reaches the backwater from a mill dam in the town of Ashland.

In Ashland, the river drops 50 feet (15 m) in 0.2 miles (0.3 km), sufficient to provide hydropower for numerous industries when the town originally grew in the 19th century. Below the center of town, the river wanders southeast under railroad tracks and Interstate 93 and past the Ashland sewage treatment plant before entering the Pemigewasset River in the northwest corner of the town of New Hampton.

== See also ==
- List of rivers of New Hampshire
