= Kevin A. Roth =

Kevin A Roth
- Born: Virginia, United States
- Education: Stanford University; University of Michigan
- Scientific career
- Fields: Neuropathology, Neuronal Cell Death, Neuro-oncology
- Workplaces: Columbia University Irving Medical Center; University of Alabama at Birmingham; Washington University in St. Louis

Kevin A. Roth is an American neuropathologist and former Chair of Pathology at Columbia University and the University of Alabama at Birmingham (UAB). He was the President of the American Society for Investigative Pathology from 2014-2015, and performed research for over three decades on apoptotic cell death in neural development, neurodegenerative disease, and tumors of the nervous system.

== Education ==
Roth was raised in Sandusky, Ohio, where his family helped to establish the Barb and Tom Roth Family STREAM Lab at Sandusky Central Catholic School. He received his B.S. in Behavioral Sciences from the University of Michigan, and his M.D., Ph.D. degrees from Stanford University School of Medicine. He trained as a neuropathologist at Washington University School of Medicine / Barnes-Jewish Hospital.

== Career ==
After his training, Roth ultimately rose to the rank of tenured full professor in the Department of Pathology and Immunology at Washington University School of Medicine. He then moved to the University of Alabama at Birmingham (UAB) where he initially was Neuropathology Division Director and was subsequently named Chair of the UAB Department of Pathology. He was also the inaugural Director of the UAB Comprehensive Neuroscience Center. Roth worked at UAB for 13 years before moving in 2015 to Columbia University Irving Medical Center in New York City as the Pathologist-in-Chief at NewYork-Presbyterian Hospital-Columbia University Irving Medical Center and Professor and Chair of the Columbia University Department of Pathology and Cell Biology. Roth retired from Columbia in 2023.

Roth was the Editor-in-Chief of the Journal of Histochemistry and Cytochemistry (2006-2010), and the American Journal of Pathology (2013-2017), and served as President of the American Society for Investigative Pathology from 2014 to 2015. His research focused on defining the molecular pathways regulating neuronal cell death during development and in disease conditions. His laboratory helped define the role of both apoptotic and non-apoptotic cell death pathways in development and neurodegenerative disease. His research uncovered details of the cellular origins of malignant glial tumors of the central and peripheral nervous systems and the mechanisms of chemotherapy-induced tumor cell death. He has published over 200 scientific papers.

== Selected publications ==
- Olney, JW; Tenkova, T; Dikranian, K; Muglia, LJ; Jermakowicz, WJ; D'Sa, C; Roth, KA (2002). "Ethanol-induced caspase-3 activation in the in vivo developing mouse brain". Neurobiol Dis. 9: 205–19. doi:10.1006/nbdi.2001.0475. PMID 11895372..
- Geng, Y; Kohli, L; Klocke, BJ; Roth, KA (2010). "Chloroquine-induced autophagic vacuole accumulation and cell death in glioma cells is p53 independent". Neuro Oncol. 12: 473–81. doi:10.1093/neuonc/nop048. PMC 2940627. PMID 20406898.
- Akhtar, RS; Ness, JM; Roth, KA (2004). "Bcl-2 family regulation of neuronal development and neurodegeneration". Biochim Biophys Acta. 1644: 189–203. doi:10.1016/j.bbamcr.2003.10.013. PMID 14996503..
- Roth, KA; Mefford, IM; Barchas, JD (1982). "Epinephrine, norepinephrine, dopamine and serotonin: differential effects of acute and chronic stress on regional brain amines". Brain Res. 239: 417–24. doi:10.1016/0006-8993(82)90519-4. PMID 6178468..
- Roth, KA (2001). "Caspases, apoptosis, and Alzheimer disease: causation, correlation, and confusion". J Neuropathol Exp Neurol. 60: 829–38. doi:10.1093/jnen/60.9.829. PMID 11556539..
- Shindler, KS; Roth, KA (1996). "Double immunofluorescent staining using two unconjugated primary antisera raised in the same species". J Histochem Cytochem. 44: 1331–5. doi:10.1177/44.11.8918908. PMID 8918908..
