= Squam Lake =

Lake in Belknap County, New Hampshire

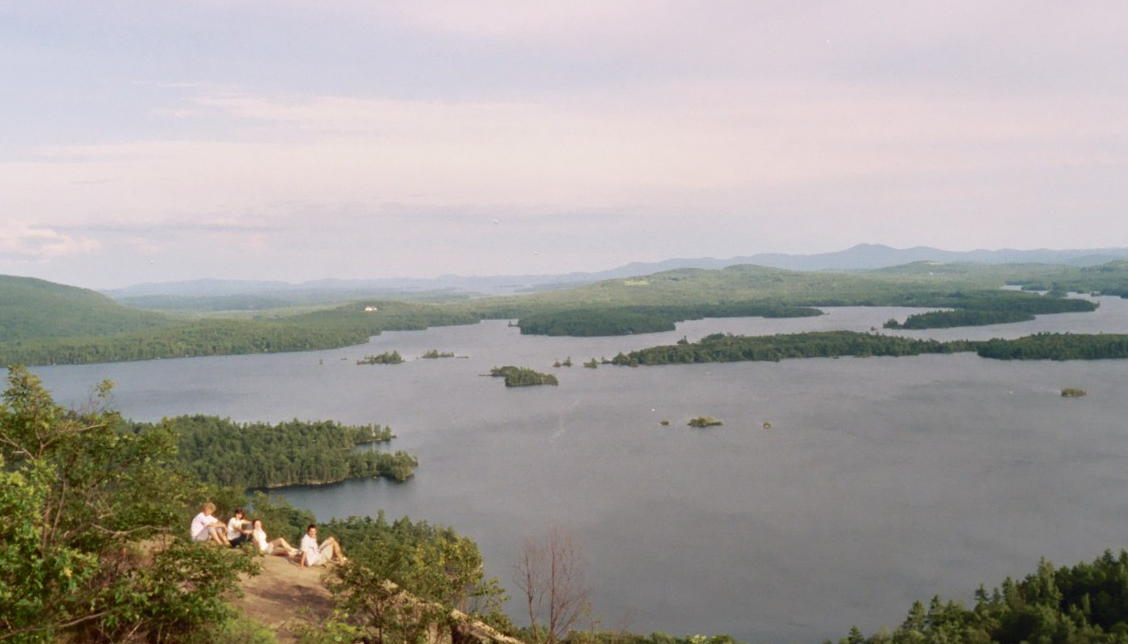
- View from the cliffs of East Rattlesnake

- Location within New Hampshire
- Location: Grafton County, Carroll County, and Belknap County, New Hampshire
- Coordinates: 43°44′43″N 71°31′34″W
- Primary outflows: Squam River
- Basin countries: United States
- Max. length: 7.0 mi (11.3 km)
- Max. width: 4.6 mi (7.4 km)
- Surface area: 6,791 acres (2,748 ha)
- Max. depth: 99 ft (30 m)
- Surface elevation: 561 ft (171 m)
- Islands: 28 named (see list)
- Settlements: Holderness; Sandwich; Moultonborough; Center Harbor

Squam Lake is a lake located in the Lakes Region of central New Hampshire, United States, south of the White Mountains, straddling the borders of Grafton, Carroll, and Belknap counties. The largest town center on the lake is Holderness. The lake is located northwest of much larger Lake Winnipesaukee.

It drains via a short natural channel into Little Squam Lake, and then through a dam at the head of the short Squam River into the Pemigewasset at Ashland. Covering 6,791 acres (27.48 km^{2}), Squam is the second-largest lake located entirely in New Hampshire.

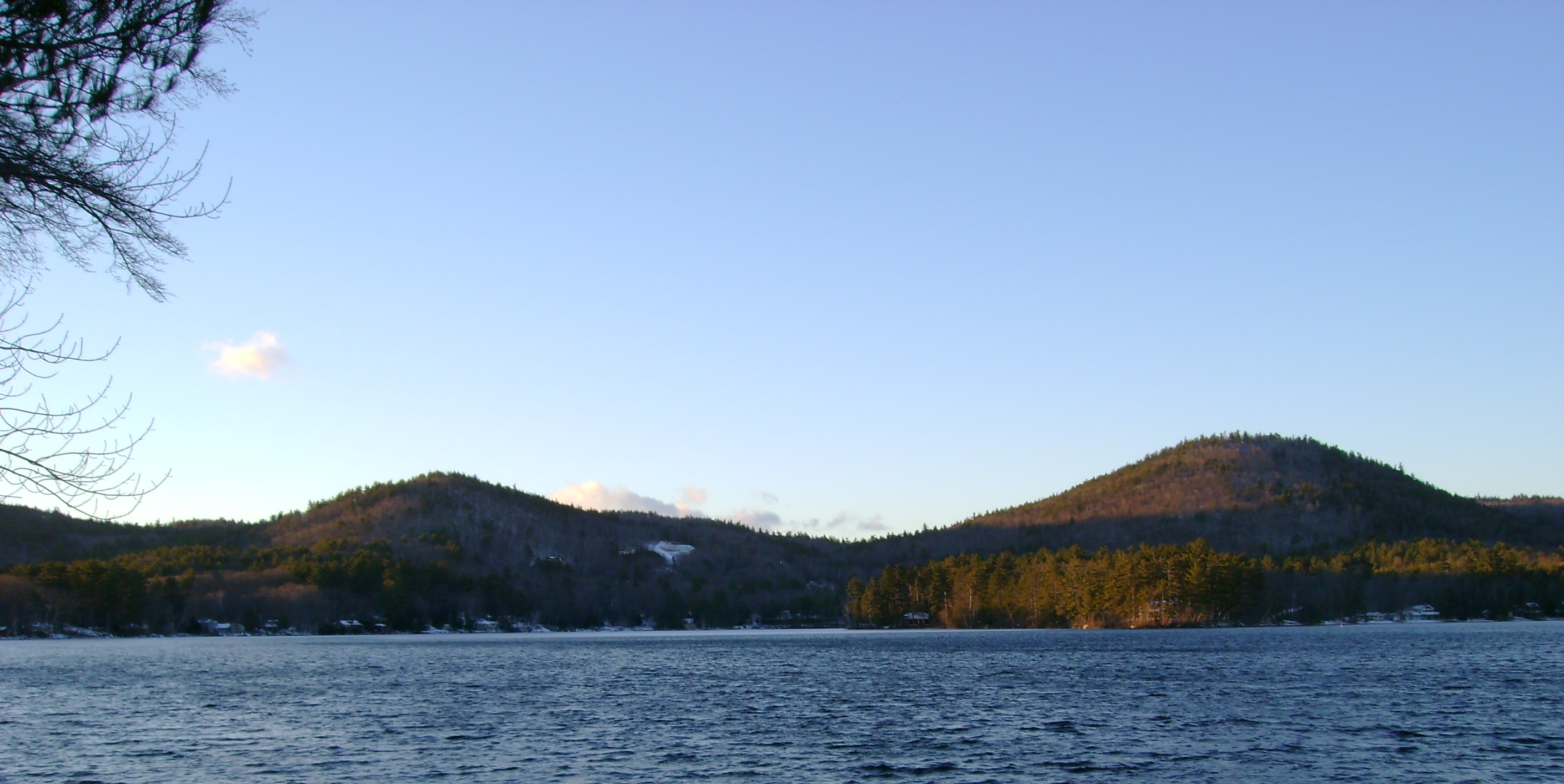
Squam Lake in 2006

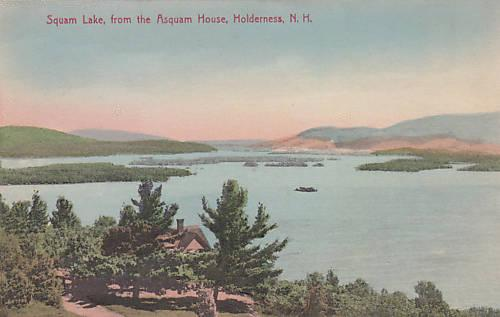
Squam Lake from the Asquam House, Holderness, NH

Squam Lake was originally called Keeseenunknipee, which meant "the goose lake in the highlands". The white settlers that followed shortened the name to "Casumpa", "Kusumpy" and/or "Kesumpe" around 1779. In the early 19th century, the lake was given another Abenaki name, Asquam, which means "water". Finally, in the early 20th century, Asquam was shortened to its present version, Squam.

Squam Lake is much less commercialized than its neighbor Lake Winnipesaukee, which has waterfront attractions in Meredith, Weirs Beach, and other locations. Unlike the numerous businesses dotting the shores of Winnipesaukee, only a few are present on Squam, and none of them are located on Squam itself (there is an ice cream shop, a general store/marketplace, a restaurant, two marinas, and multiple gas stations on Little Squam). The Squam Lakes Association maintains four boat-launching sites on the lake.

The 1981 film On Golden Pond was filmed in the town of Center Harbor on Squam Lake. There are two tour boat services on the lake, both based in Holderness. One is Experience Squam, a private charter, and the other is the Squam Lakes Natural Science Center. Both services show filming locations and items of natural significance.

Squam Lake is a nesting site for common loons and is a good place to see them in breeding plumage during the summer months. Bald eagles and great blue herons are also known to nest on the lake.

The lake is classified as a cold- and warmwater fishery, with observed species including rainbow trout, landlocked salmon, lake trout, lake whitefish, smallmouth and largemouth bass, chain pickerel, horned pout, and white perch.

== Islands ==
Squam Lake has about 30 named islands and numerous smaller, unnamed islets. The named islands are:

- Basin Island
- Birch Island
- Bowman Island
- Carnes Island
- Chocorua (Church) Island
- Duck Island
- Great Island
- Groton Island
- High Haith (at 243 acres (98 ha), the largest island, but only separated from mainland by narrow ditch bridged by road)
- Hoag Island
- Hubble Island
- Kate Island
- Kent Island
- Kimball Island
- Laurel Island
- Little Loon Island (nesting site to bald eagles in 2003, 2005, 2006, 2012)
- Long Island
- Loon Island
- Merrill Island
- Mink Island
- Mooney (or Moon) Island
- Mouse Island
- Otter Island
- Perch Island
- Potato Island
- Sheep Island
- Three Sisters (three separate islands)
- Utopia Island
- Yard Island

== Events ==
On June 26, 1932, while vacationing on Squam Lake, astronomer Adelaide Ames was taking a canoe tour with a friend on the lake when the boat capsized. She was presumed to have drowned and her body was found after a ten-day search on July 5, 1932. She died at the age of 32.

== See also ==
- List of lakes in New Hampshire
- Rockywold–Deephaven Camps
