= Harry Gideon Wells =

American pathologist

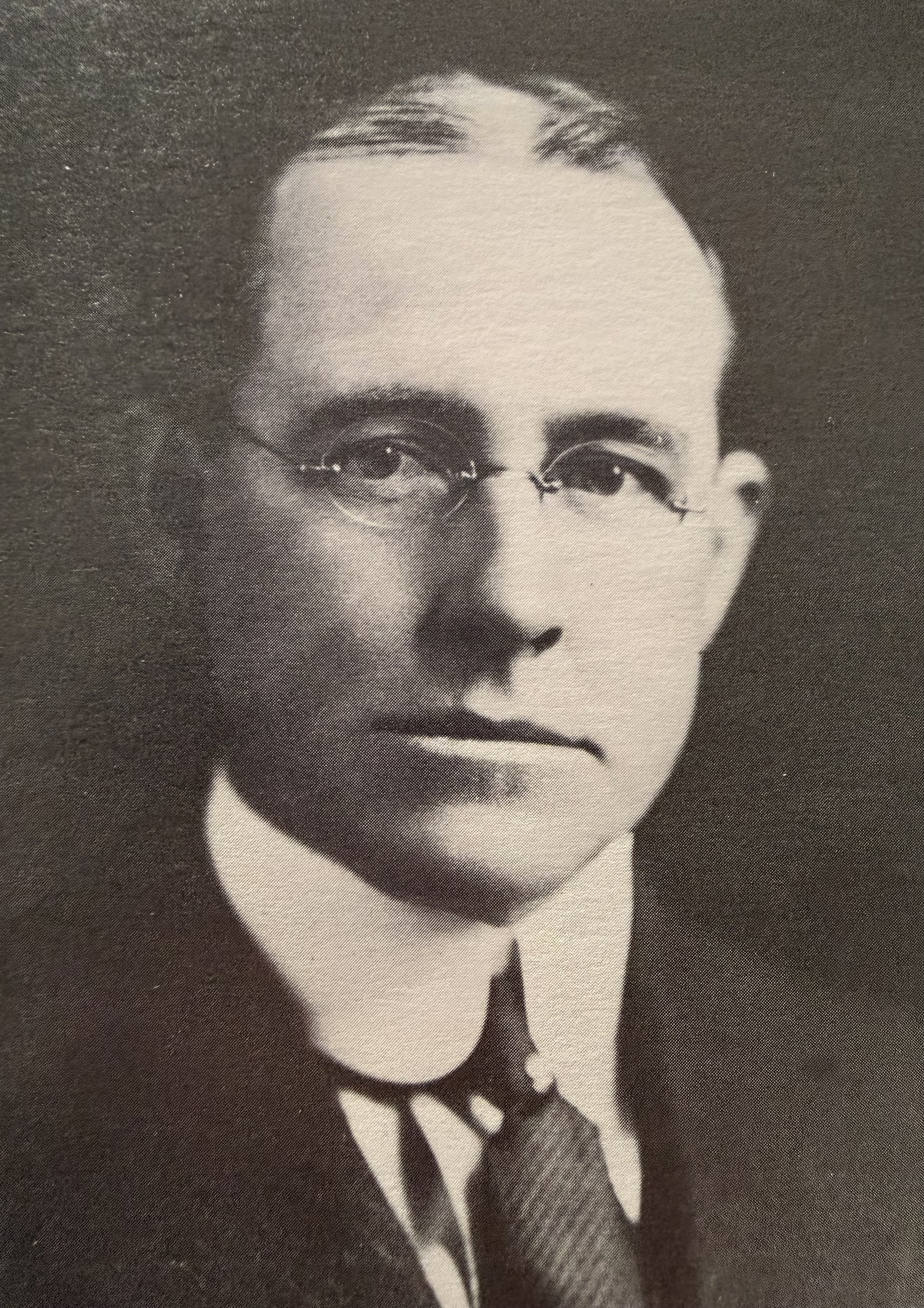
- Born: July 21, 1875; New Haven, Connecticut
- Died: April 26, 1943 (aged 67); Chicago, Ill
- Education: Yale University; Rush Medical College
- Awards: National Academy of Sciences
- Scientific career
- Fields: pathology
- Workplaces: University of Chicago

Harry Gideon Wells (21 July 1875–26 April 1943) was an American pathologist and immunologist.

== Early life and education ==
Wells was born on 21 July 1875 in New Haven, Connecticut to a family of old New England stock. His parents were Romanta Wells, a partner in a wholesale drug company, and Emma Townsend Tuttle. He was a descendant of Thomas Welles, colonial governor of Connecticut, and a relation of the similarly named Gideon Welles, Secretary of the Navy in the Lincoln administration.

Wells graduated in 1895 from Yale University, where he studied chemistry under Russell Henry Chittenden and Lafayette Mendel. He then graduated from Rush Medical College in 1898 and completed his internship at Cook County Hospital. He completed his fellowship in pathology at Rush, under the direction of Ludvig Hektoen. During his fellowship, he worked alongside Howard T. Ricketts and was awarded the Benjamin Rush Medal for a paper on the thyroid gland.

== Early career ==
After his fellowship, Wells returned to Chicago to join the faculty of the University of Chicago, where he would remain part of the staff for his entire career. He led the Department of Pathology and from 1911 until his retirement also headed the Otho S. A. Sprague Memorial Institute for Medical Research. He continued to further his education, studying chemistry under Julius Stieglitz, earning a PhD from the University of Chicago in 1903, and traveling to Europe to study in Berlin. His European tour included working with Ernst Leopold Salkowski, Emil Fischer, and Emil Abderhalden, among others, and on his way home, he assisted an American pathologist in Paris in the identification of the preserved remains of John Paul Jones. In 1907, he published his greatest work, Clinical Pathology, which would be reprinted in several editions and greatly influenced the future practice of pathology.

== Red Cross commissions ==
During and in the aftermath of World War I, Wells led two Red Cross commissions to Romania, which was fighting famine as well as epidemics of typhoid, typhus, and other contagions. The first commission, in 1917, involved crossing through Russia during the Russian Revolution to reach Romania. The following year, Wells returned with a second commission, arriving after the armistice. During this second commission, Wells was the liaison with Herbert Hoover's United States Food Administration. For his efforts fighting famine and disease, Wells was awarded the Order of the Star of Romania by the king.

== Later life ==
After his work in Europe, Wells resumed his position at the University of Chicago. He continued to publish significant books on the practice of pathology, as well as many research articles; at the time of his death, he had published (as either sole author or co-author) more than two hundred scientific papers, the last of which was published the month that he died. He retired in 1940 and died in 1943.

== Medical honors ==
Wells earned many honors during his career. He was president of the American Association for Cancer Research in 1915–1916 and again in 1920–1921, president of the American Association of Pathologists and Bacteriologists in 1920, and president of the American Association of Immunologists in 1924. He was made a member of the National Academy of Sciences in 1925.
