= Town Hall (Sandwich, New Hampshire) =

- U.S. National Register of Historic Places
- U.S. Historic district – Contributing property
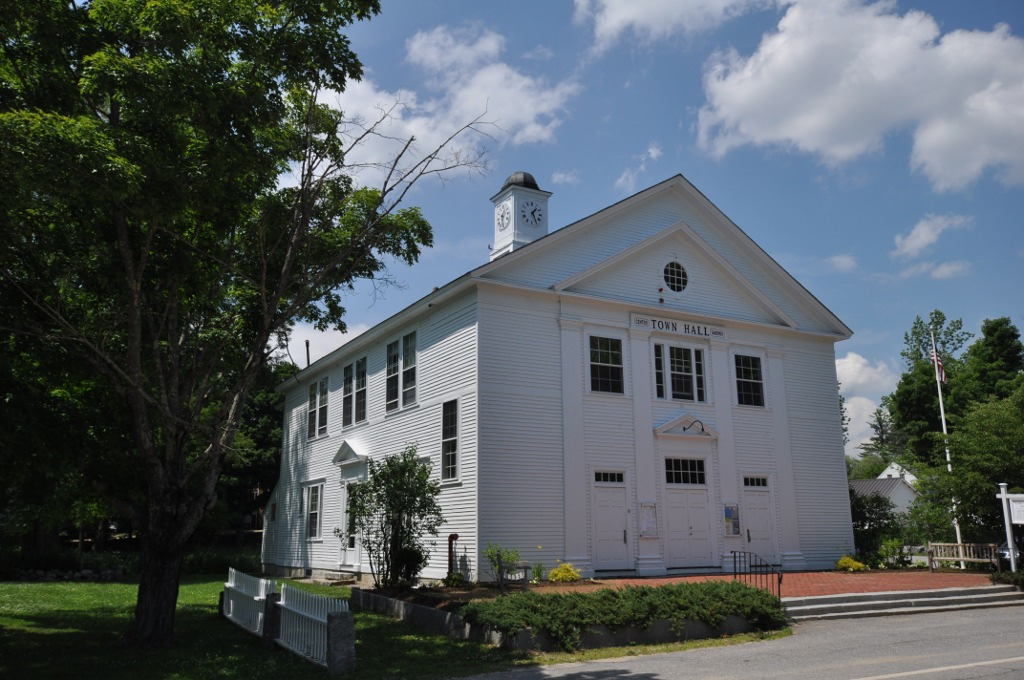

- Location within New Hampshire Location within the United States
- Location: 8 Maple St., Center Sandwich, New Hampshire
- Coordinates: 43°48′27″N 71°26′18″W
- Area: 0.1 acres (0.040 ha)
- Built: 1913
- Built by: Larkin Weed & Sons
- Architect: J. Randolph Coolidge Jr.
- Architectural style: Colonial Revival
- Part of: Center Sandwich Historic District (ID83003997)
- NRHP reference No.: 80000273

Significant dates
- Added to NRHP: May 15, 1980
- Designated CP: December 22, 1983

The Town Hall of Sandwich, New Hampshire, is located at 8 Maple Street (New Hampshire Route 113) in the village of Center Sandwich. Built in 1913, it is a handsome example of Colonial Revival architecture, and has been a prominent focal point of the town's civic and social life since its construction. The building was listed on the National Register of Historic Places in 1980.

== Description and history ==
Sandwich's Town Hall is located on the west side of Maple Street, a short way north of its junction with New Hampshire Route 109. It is a 2 1/2-story wood-frame structure, with a clapboarded exterior and gabled roof. It rests on an old foundation of cut granite blocks. The main facade has a temple-front appearance, although it is achieved with four pilasters rather than columns, supporting a fully pedimented gable end. Each of the ground-floor bays has an entrance in it, the outer ones topped by four-light transom windows. The center entry is more elaborate, with a double-leaf door topped by a double-height transom, entablature and gabled pediment. Windows are placed on the second floor, that in the center a three-part window with narrow side panels.

The building was built in 1913, on the foundation of the previous town hall, which was destroyed by fire in that year. The Colonial Revival building was designed by J. Randolph Coolidge Jr., a Boston-based architect who summered in the town. The building's ground floor houses town offices, while the second floor houses an auditorium with stage that is the only facility of its type in the town. The auditorium has historically hosted all manner of civic and social functions, including school graduations and local theatrical productions.

== See also ==
- National Register of Historic Places listings in Carroll County, New Hampshire
