= Moultonborough Academy =

High school in New Hampshire, United States

Coordinates: 43°45′03″N 71°23′47″W

Location
- 25 Blake Road; Moultonborough, (Carroll County), New Hampshire 03254; United States

Information
- Type: Public high school
- Principal: Andrew Coppinger
- Staff: 19.80 (FTE)
- Enrollment: 142 (2022-23)
- Student to teacher ratio: 7.17
- Colors: Black, red and white
- Nickname: Panthers

Moultonborough Academy is a middle and high school in Moultonborough, New Hampshire. The school educates some 350 students in grades seven through twelve. The school is located off Blake Road, near the Moultonborough Central School (K-6) on NH Route 25. The school's range of subjects include Band, Computer Literacy, Latin, Spanish, French, and Physics.

The academy's sports program includes softball, baseball, basketball, soccer, cross country running, track and field, tennis, Nordic skiing, alpine skiing, and the IL-MA football team which combines players and coaches from Inter-Lakes and Moultonborough Academy. The sports teams play in the New Hampshire Interscholastic Athletic Association (NHIAA) in Division IV. The baseball, softball, basketball, volleyball, and Nordic teams have won state championships since the academy opened in 1979.

Prior to 1979 most of Moultonborough's high school students attended Kingswood High School in Wolfeboro. Other students went to Meredith High School, to Quimby School in Sandwich, or to Brewster Academy in Wolfeboro.

The town has a reputation for encouraging its students to participate in extracurriculars, which is thought to be essential to success at the school. Athletic events are widely attended, and the larger victories are consistently celebrated with support of the fire department.
