= NH 25A =

NH 25A may refer to:

- National Highway 25A (India)
- New Hampshire Route 25A, United States
