= Red Hill River =

- The Red Hill River at Moultonborough Falls, below NH Route 25

- Location within New Hampshire Location within the United States

Location
- Country: United States
- State: New Hampshire
- County: Carroll
- Towns: Sandwich, Moultonborough

Physical characteristics
- Source: Little Pond
  - location: Sandwich
  - coordinates: 43°47′41″N 71°24′2″W
  - elevation: 650 ft (200 m)
- Mouth: Lees Pond
  - location: Moultonborough
  - coordinates: 43°44′23″N 71°24′14″W
  - elevation: 508 ft (155 m)
- Length: 6.5 mi (10.5 km)

Basin features
- Tributaries
  - right: Stanton Brook, Montgomery Brook, Cook Brook, Skinner Brook

The Red Hill River is a 6.5-mile-long (10.5 km) river in the Lakes Region of central New Hampshire in the United States. It is a tributary of Lake Winnipesaukee, part of the Merrimack River watershed.

The Red Hill River begins in the town of Sandwich, New Hampshire, at the outlet of Little Pond Red Hill Pond, just east of the village of Sandwich. The river flows north into Red Hill Pond, then turns west to flow past the village of Center Sandwich. The river then turns south and flows through a series of wetlands, into Moultonborough. The river passes through Garland Pond and drops in a short river segment past the hamlet of Moultonborough Falls to Lees Pond, the outlet of which leads almost directly into an arm of Moultonborough Bay on Lake Winnipesaukee.

== See also ==
- List of rivers of New Hampshire
