= New Hampshire Route 25 =

State highway in New Hampshire, US

New Hampshire Route 25
- NH 25 highlighted in red

Route information
- Maintained by NHDOT
- Length: 96.630 mi (155.511 km)

Major junctions
- West end: VT 25 at the Vermont state line in Piermont
- I-93 / US 3 / NH 3A in Plymouth; US 3 in Meredith; NH 16 in Ossipee
- East end: SR 25 at the Maine state line in Freedom

Location
- Country: United States
- State: New Hampshire
- Counties: Grafton, Belknap, Carroll

Highway system
- New Hampshire Highway System; Interstate; US; State; Turnpikes
← NH 18	→ NH 26
← Route 24	N.E.	→ Route 25A

New Hampshire Route 25 is a 96.62-mile (155.49 km) long east–west state highway in New Hampshire. It runs completely across the state from Vermont to Maine.

The western terminus of Route 25 is at the Vermont state line on the Connecticut River in Piermont, where the road continues west as Vermont Route 25. The eastern terminus is on the Maine state line in the town of Freedom, where the road continues east as Maine State Route 25.

== Route description ==
New Hampshire Route 25 begins at the state border, on the western bank of the Connecticut River, where it continues west as VT 25. It crosses the river on a metal truss bridge and enters the town of Piermont. Upon reaching Four Corners near the center of Piermont, NH 25 turns north to form a concurrency with NH 10, while the roadway continues east through the intersection as NH 25C, a more direct but rugged route to the town of Warren. Heading north along with NH 10 parallel to the Connecticut River, NH 25 is known locally as Dartmouth College Highway. Upon entering the town of Haverhill, in Haverhill Village, NH 25 leaves the concurrency along Mount Moosilauke Highway, paralleling Oliverian Brook.

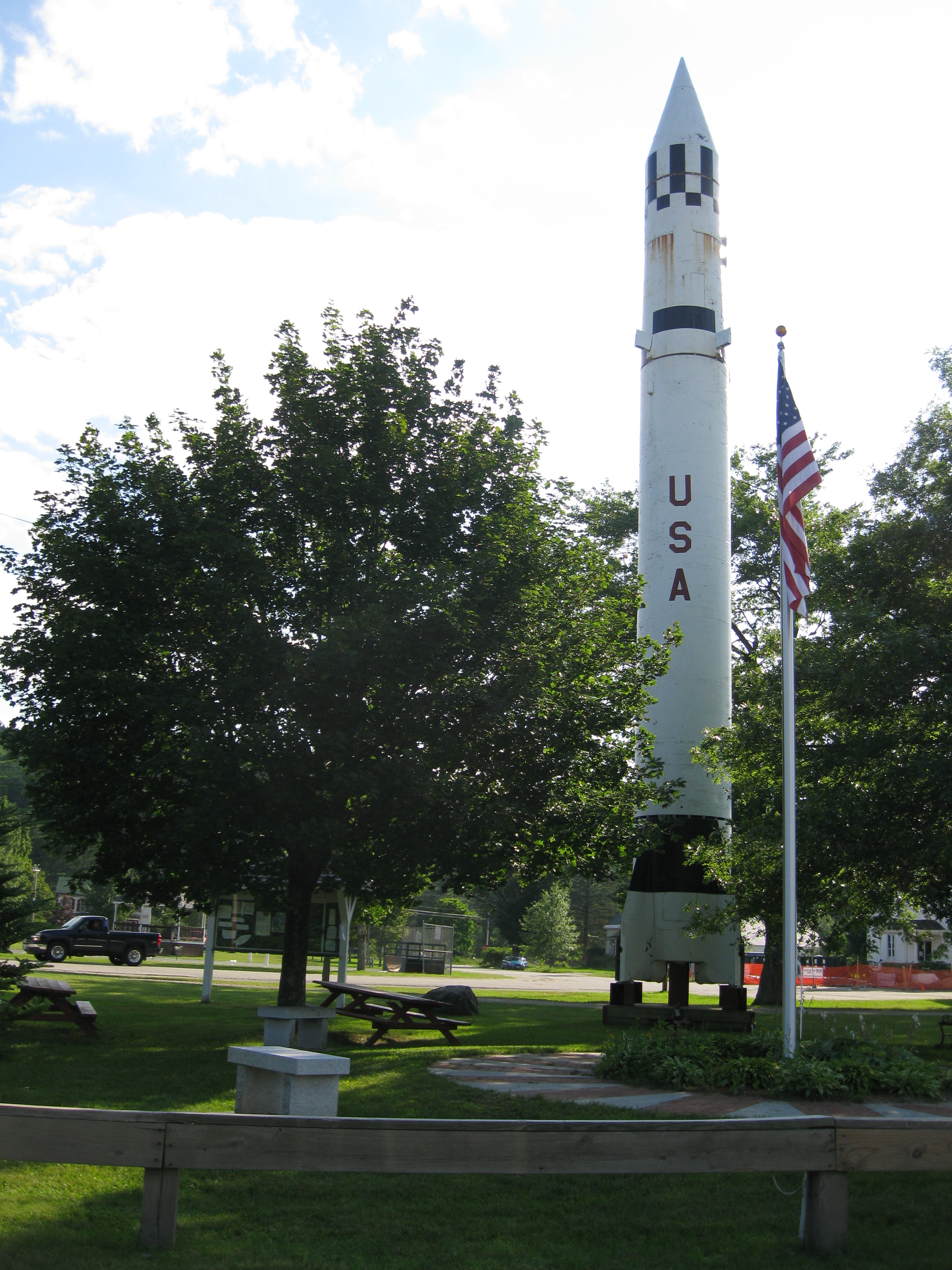
A Redstone missile is a prominent landmark at the Warren Town Common along NH 25.

Upon leaving Haverhill Village, NH 25 passes through the communities of Pike and East Haverhill, the location of the Oliverian School, before entering the town of Benton. NH 25 crosses the southwestern corner of Benton, but lacks any road connection to the rest of the town. To the northeast of the road sits the western end of the White Mountain chain, with Mount Moosilauke rising prominently. The road bends to the south and enters the town of Warren in the village of Glencliff. Winding southwards, the route merges with Route 118 to pass through the main village of Warren. The two conjoined routes parallel the Baker River, crossing it several times before entering Wentworth.

In Wentworth, NH 25/NH 118 meets the eastern terminus of NH 25A, which connects to the towns of Orford, New Hampshire, and Fairlee, Vermont. Turning gently towards the southeast, NH 25/NH 118 passes by the Plummer's Ledge Natural Area and enters the town of Rumney. NH 118 leaves to the southwest upon entering Rumney, and NH 25 continues southeastward, passing the villages of West Rumney, Rumney Depot, and Quincy. Nearby attractions include Rumney Rocks, a popular rock climbing venue, and Polar Caves Park, a series of glacial caves. Still following the Baker River, NH 25 enters the town of Plymouth, meeting NH 3A at a traffic circle in the village of West Plymouth. 3A merges from the south and the two routes head east along Tenney Mountain Highway. At the northern edge of Plymouth Village, there is a brief freeway interchange where NH 25 east merges with US 3 south, while the roadway continues on a short while before merging with an interchange on I-93 (exit 26). The interchange marks the northern end of NH 3A.

Now cosigned with US 3, NH 25 heads south along the western bank of the Pemigewasset River through Plymouth Village along Main Street, passing Plymouth State University and by a commercial district south of the university campus at the town common. In the center of the university campus there is an intersection with NH 175A, a short connector bridging the Pemigewasset and providing access to I-93 (exit 25) and NH 175. After leaving Plymouth Village, NH 25 and US 3 travel through a more rural area of Plymouth before crossing the extreme northern corner of the town of Bridgewater. After crossing the Pemigewasset into Ashland, there is an interchange with I-93 (Exit 24) and the conjoined routes turn east into Ashland Village along Daniel Webster Highway, intersect NH 132 at Main Street and Highland Street, and turn north along the western shore of Little Squam Lake.

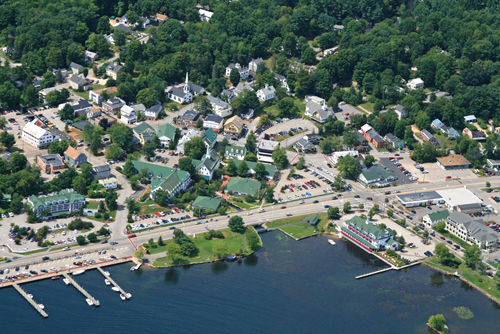
An aerial view of the intersection of Daniel Webster Highway (US 3) and Main Street in Meredith, New Hampshire. North is to the right. NH 25 enters from the north along Daniel Webster Highway, then turns sharply left along Main Street, and leaves to the northeast.

Entering the town of Holderness, there is an intersection with the southern end of NH 175 and the road curves to the east to follow the shore of Little Squam Lake. Passing between Little Squam Lake and Squam Lake, the two routes meet the southern terminus of NH 113 and pass by the main village of Holderness and the Squam Lakes Natural Science Center. After curving to the southeast, the routes pass through the village of East Holderness and pass into the town of Center Harbor. Shortly after entering town, NH 25/US 3 turns to a more southerly direction, while NH 25B has its western terminus. NH 25B provides a much more direct route for travellers continuing on NH 25, as the main route loops southward into the town of Meredith. In Meredith Village, at the tip of Meredith Bay on Lake Winnipesaukee, NH 25 leaves its long concurrency with US 3, turning sharply to the northeast along Main Street/Whittier Highway. Passing Inter-Lakes Middle High School, NH 25 turns northward when it meets the shores of Lake Winnipesaukee main axis, known as The Broads, and passes into Center Harbor a second time.

After re-entering Center Harbor, NH 25 meets the eastern end of NH 25B at the central business district of Center Harbor at the northern tip of the main axis of Lake Winnipesaukee, and heads east into Moultonborough. Passing by a number of the smaller lakes that give New Hampshire's Lakes Region its name, NH 25 travels northeast, having a brief concurrency with NH 109 in Moultonborough Village, turns northwards and passes Moultonborough Airport, then passes through the East Sandwich portion of the town of Sandwich. Turning to the east, NH 25 next enters the town of Tamworth, merging with NH 113 at Bennett Corners. The two routes run concurrently eastwards along the south bank of the Bearcamp River into the village of Whittier, where NH 113 leaves to the north. Within Tamworth, NH 25 is known as Bearcamp Highway. Bending to the southeast, NH 25 enters Ossipee.

In West Ossipee, NH 25 (now known as Ossipee Mountain Highway) passes near the historic Whittier Bridge before crossing over the Bearcamp River and coming to a T-intersection with NH 16 and joining it southbound along White Mountain Highway. Heading southeast past the western shore of Ossipee Lake, there are two intersections with NH 16B before NH 25 leaves White Mountain Highway to the northeast at an interchange in Center Ossipee. Passing through the Ossipee Lake Natural Area south of Ossipee Lake, NH 25 crosses into Effingham, passing through the village of Effingham Falls along a brief concurrency with NH 153, then crossing the Ossipee River into the town of Freedom, New Hampshire. Now following the northern bank of the Ossipee River, NH 25 reaches its eastern terminus at the Maine border, with the roadway continuing into the town of Porter, Maine, as Maine Route 25.

== History ==

In the 1920s, NH 25 was part of New England Interstate Route 25, a route in the New England Interstate Highway system.

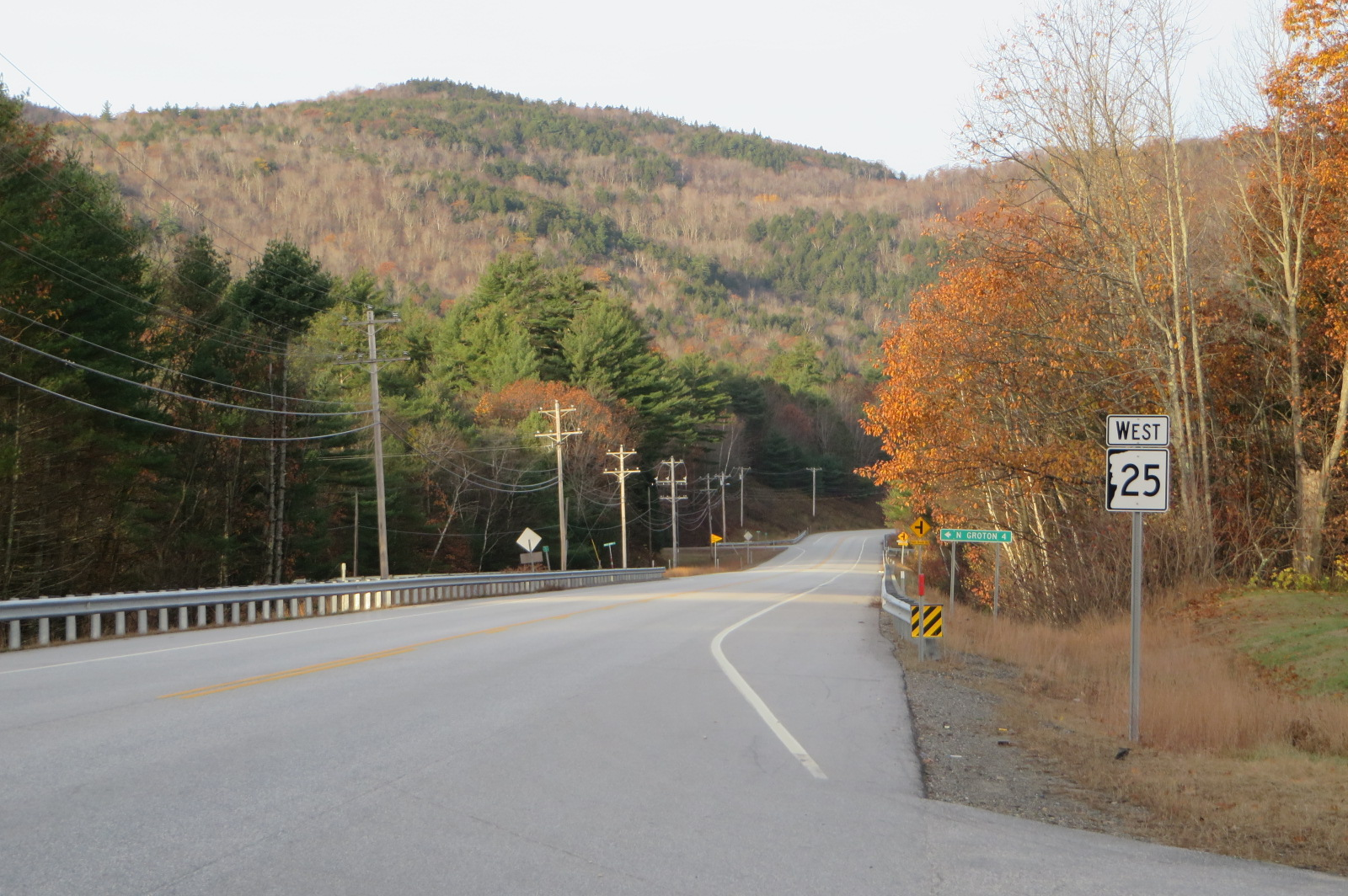
Route 25 in Rumney, NH, looking west

== Junction list ==
County	Location	mi	km	Destinations	Notes
Grafton	Piermont	0.000	0.000	VT 25 north (Waits River Road) – Bradford	Continuation from Vermont
Grafton	Piermont	1.813	2.918	NH 10 south (Dartmouth College Highway) – Hanover NH 25C east (Lake Tarleton Road) – Warren	Western end of concurrency with NH 10; western terminus of NH 25C
Grafton	Haverhill	7.129	11.473	NH 10 north (Dartmouth College Highway) – Woodsville	Eastern end of concurrency with NH 10
Grafton	Warren	20.894	33.626	NH 118 north (Sawyer Highway) – North Woodstock	Western end of concurrency with NH 118
Grafton	Warren	21.793	35.072	NH 25C (Lake Tarleton Road) – Piermont	Eastern terminus of NH 25C
Grafton	Wentworth	25.638	41.260	NH 25A west (Orford Road) – Orford	Eastern terminus of NH 25A
Grafton	Rumney	29.853	48.044	NH 118 south (Dorchester Road) – Dorchester, Canaan	Eastern end of concurrency with NH 118
Grafton	Plymouth	37.296	60.022	NH 3A south (Mayhew Turnpike) – Newfound Lake, Bristol	Western end of concurrency with NH 3A
Grafton	Plymouth	40.948– 41.237	65.899– 66.365	NH 3A north (Tenney Mountain Highway) to I-93 – Concord, Littleton US 3 north (Daniel Webster Highway) – Campton	Interchange; eastern end of concurrency with NH 3A; Western end of concurrency with US 3
Grafton	Plymouth	41.885	67.407	NH 175A east (Holderness Road) to I-93 – Holderness	Western terminus of NH 175A
Grafton	Ashland	46.943– 47.324	75.547– 76.161	I-93 (Styles Bridges Highway) – Tilton, Concord, Plymouth, Littleton	Exit 24 on I-93
Grafton	Ashland	48.011	77.266	NH 132 south (Main Street) – New Hampton, Tilton	Northern terminus of NH 132
Grafton	Holderness	50.621	81.467	NH 175 north	Southern terminus of NH 175
Grafton	Holderness	51.756	83.293	NH 113 east (Squam Lake Road) – Sandwich	Western terminus of NH 113
Belknap	Center Harbor	56.504	90.934	NH 25B east (Plymouth Street) – Center Harbor	Western terminus of NH 25B
Belknap	Meredith	59.608	95.930	US 3 south (Daniel Webster Highway) – Laconia	Eastern end of concurrency with US 3
Belknap	Center Harbor	64.343	103.550	NH 25B west (Plymouth Street) – Holderness	Eastern terminus of NH 25B
Carroll	Moultonborough	69.178	111.331	NH 109 north (Holland Street) – Center Sandwich	Western end of concurrency with NH 109
Carroll	Moultonborough	69.777	112.295	NH 109 south (Governor John Wentworth Highway) – Melvin Village, Wolfeboro	Eastern end of concurrency with NH 109
Carroll	Tamworth	75.736	121.885	NH 113 west (Jackman Pond Road) – North Sandwich	Western end of concurrency with NH 113
Carroll	Tamworth	78.586	126.472	NH 113 east (Whittier Road)	Eastern end of concurrency with NH 113
Carroll	Ossipee	82.260	132.385	NH 16 north (White Mountain Highway) – Chocorua, Conway	Western end of concurrency with NH 16
Carroll	Ossipee	87.884	141.436	NH 16 south (White Mountain Highway) – Wolfeboro, Rochester	Interchange; eastern end of concurrency with NH 16
Carroll	Effingham	93.261	150.089	NH 153 north (Green Mountain Road) – Effingham Falls	Western end of concurrency with NH 153
Carroll	Effingham	94.139	151.502	NH 153 south (Effingham Trail) – Center Effingham	Eastern end of concurrency with NH 153
Carroll	Freedom	96.630	155.511	SR 25 east (Ossipee Trail) – Portland	Continuation into Maine
1.000 mi = 1.609 km; 1.000 km = 0.621 mi: Concurrency terminus

== Suffixed routes ==
=== New Hampshire Route 25A ===
Route 25A

Route information
- Maintained by VTrans and NHDOT
- Length: 15.117 mi (24.328 km): Vermont: 0.088 miles (0.142 km); New Hampshire: 15.029 miles (24.187 km)

Major junctions
- West end: US 5 in Fairlee, VT
- NH 10 in Orford, NH
- East end: NH 25 / NH 118 in Wentworth, NH

Location
- Country: United States
- State: New Hampshire
- Counties: VT: Orange, NH: Grafton

Highway system
- New Hampshire Highway System; Interstate; US; State; Turnpikes
- State highways in Vermont
← VT 25	Vermont	→ VT 25B

New Hampshire Route 25A is a 15.117-mile (24.328 km) long east–west state highway in New Hampshire connecting Wentworth and Orford. It runs through a scenic, mountainous area of western New Hampshire.

The western terminus of NH 25A is at the Vermont state line on the Connecticut River in the town of Orford, where the route continues west as the short Vermont Route 25A. 150 yards (140 m) from the state line, VT 25A ends at U.S. Route 5 in Fairlee. The eastern terminus of NH 25A is in the town of Wentworth at New Hampshire Route 25 and New Hampshire Route 118.

In 2002, the state designated most of NH 25A as the Governor Meldrim Thomson Scenic Highway. The highway runs from Wentworth to the junction with New Hampshire Route 10 in Orford. The road was named in honor of the late Gov. Meldrim Thomson, Jr., who died April 19, 2001. Thomson's Mt. Cube Farm lined both sides of the highway.

=== New Hampshire Route 25B ===
New Hampshire Route 25B
- Location: Center Harbor
- Length: 3.246 mi (5.224 km)

New Hampshire Route 25B (abbreviated NH 25B) is a 3.246-mile-long (5.224 km) east–west state highway in New Hampshire. It runs through the town of Center Harbor in the state's Lakes Region.

The eastern terminus is in Center Harbor at New Hampshire Route 25. The western terminus is in Center Harbor at U.S. Route 3 and New Hampshire Route 25. The entire length of road is known as Dane Road and as Plymouth Street.

=== New Hampshire Route 25C ===
New Hampshire Route 25C
- Location: Piermont–Warren
- Length: 13.218 mi (21.272 km)

New Hampshire Route 25C (abbreviated NH 25C) is a 13.218-mile-long (21.272 km) east–west state highway in New Hampshire. It runs through the scenic, mountainous area connecting Warren and Piermont. While more direct than the main routing of NH 25, shortening the length between its end points by several miles, the terrain is also more rugged.

The western terminus of NH 25C is in Piermont at New Hampshire Route 10 and New Hampshire Route 25. The eastern terminus is in Warren at NH 25 and New Hampshire Route 118. The entire length of highway is known as Lake Tarleton Road.

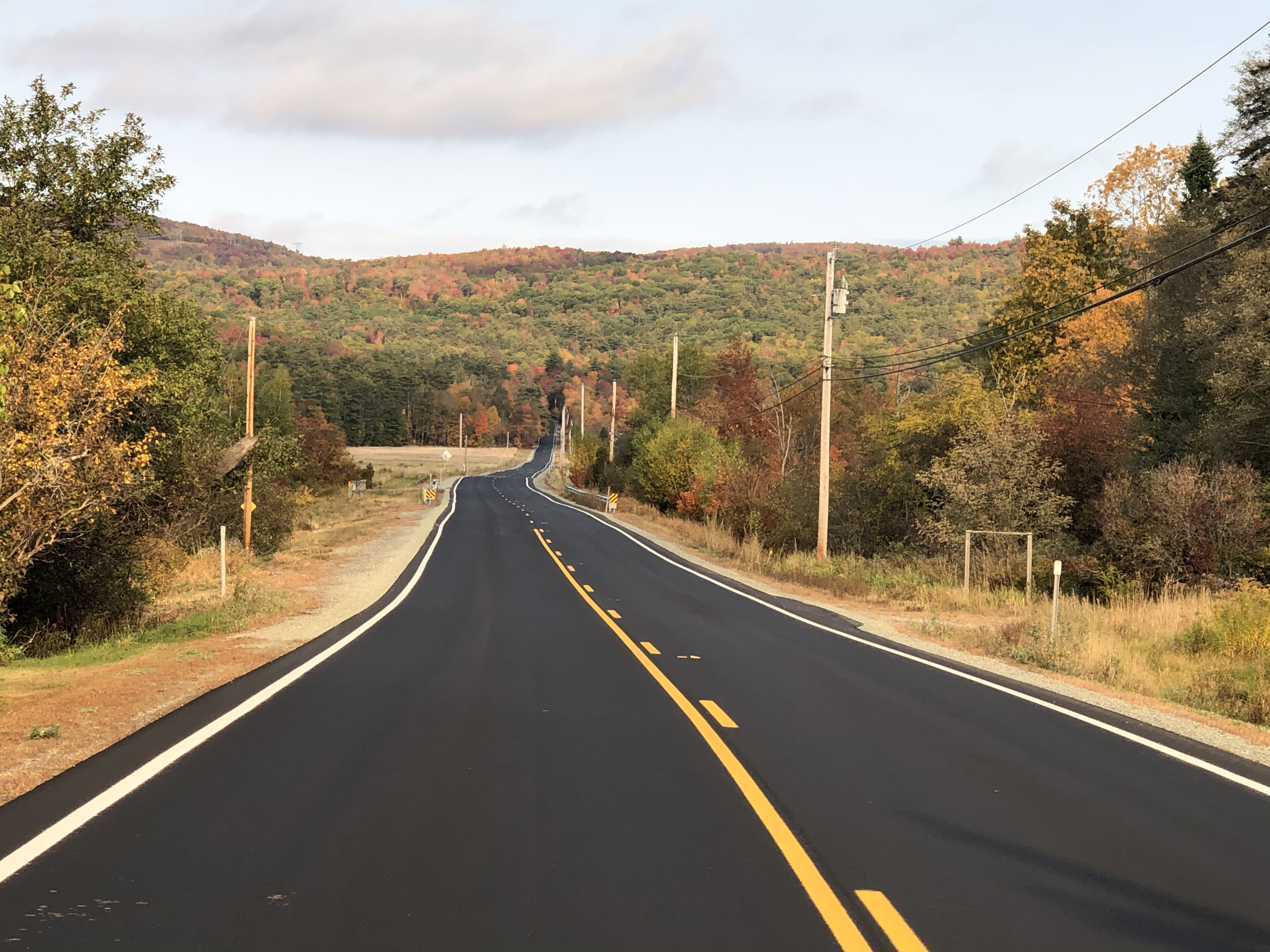
NH 25C leading northwest out of Warren
