= Sandwich Fair =

Annual fair in New Hampshire

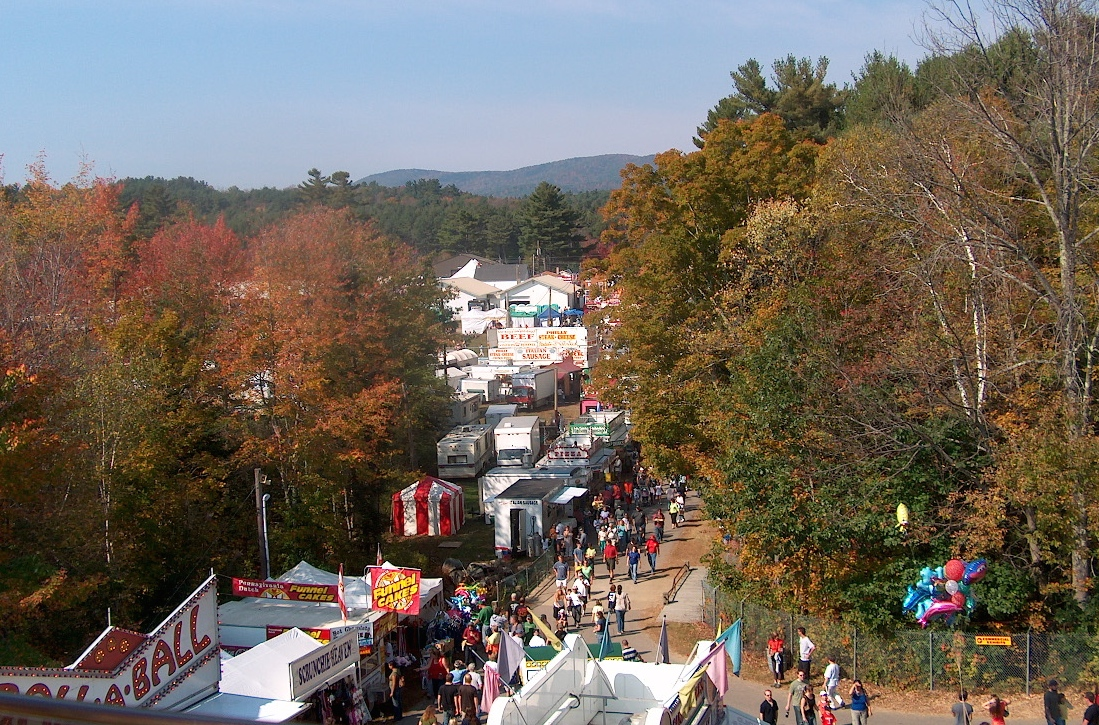
The Sandwich Fair in 2007

The Sandwich Fair is an annual event held on Columbus Day weekend in Sandwich, New Hampshire. The midway is open the three days of the fair and the Friday night prior to the fair's start. Two parades are part of the fair: an antique auto parade on Saturday and then the "Grand Street Parade" on Sunday, including marching bands from Inter-Lakes High School and Moultonborough Academy.

== History ==
The fair was first held on Sunday October 10, 1909 as a Grange fair. The fair celebrated its centennial in 2010, with 35,000 people attending. 5,000 attended in 1921, and some sporting events were cancelled because of rain that day.

The fair was a three-day event for the first time in 1988 and is now held annually on Columbus Day Weekend. The fair is held on the fairgrounds near the Samuel Wentworth Library and the tennis courts and the field after the fire station. The Fair is managed by the Sandwich Fair Association, which owns the fairgrounds. The Gillette Shows company of Pittsfield, Massachusetts manages the midway attractions.

There was no fair in 1917–18, 1942–44 nor 2020.

Friday night has been the midway preview for several years. A bracelet can be purchased granting unlimited ride access from 4 pm until 9 pm. Admission is free. Exhibit halls are closed on Friday night.

Saturday has been "kids" day with a ride special bracelet which grants unlimited ride access from 9 am - 2 pm. Exhibit halls open at 9 am and the animal shows start on Saturday also.

Sunday has always featured the "Grand Street Parade" and is still a major feature of the day along with all of the open animal shows. Horse and oxen pulling have always been very well attended. An original Abbot-Downing Company Concord coach leads the annual parade.

Monday is "Senior" day, on which seniors age 65 and up get a discount admission price, and is also the day to see all of the "4-H" animal shows.
