= Dixi Crosby =

American surgeon (1800–1873)

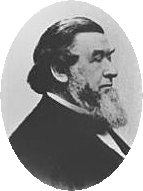
- Crosby, circa 1870
- Born: February 8, 1800; Sandwich, New Hampshire, US
- Died: September 26, 1873 (aged 73); Hanover, New Hampshire, US
- Occupation: Surgeon
- Known for: Reducing metacarpophalangeal dislocation
- Spouse: Mary Jane Moody

Dixi Crosby (February 8, 1800 – September 26, 1873) was an American surgeon and educator at Dartmouth College. He created a new technique for reducing metacarpophalangeal dislocation and was the first surgeon to open an abscess at the hip joint. Crosby was also the first surgeon in the United States to be sued for medical malpractice.

== Early life and education ==
Crosby was born February 8, 1800, in Sandwich, New Hampshire, United States. His parents were Dr Asa Crosby and Betsey (Hoit) Crosby. Just before his birth, there was concern among his parents. Asa wanted a boy and Betsey wanted a girl. It turned out the new baby was a boy and Asa, the elated father, exclaimed "Dixi" in an overjoyed voice (Latin Dixi, "I told you so"). Dixi became the child's name.

He received the typical education of the time when he grew up in the village where the family lived. It is not known if he was a graduate of any school. He did go into his ventures to make money when youthful but failed due to lack of experience in the business. He then pursued his father's trade as a surgeon.

== Medical career ==
Crosby was 20 when he took up the study of medicine with his father. He began practicing surgery within a year of when he seriously took up his medical training. One example of successful surgery in his first year of practice was when he performed an amputation of a leg to save a patient. His father and other surgeons had already declared that the patient could not survive such an operation – but Crosby saved his life.

Crosby studied at Dartmouth Medical School and eventually received his degree from that college in 1824. He practiced his medical profession for fourteen years in various places within the state of New Hampshire and then moved to Hanover, New Hampshire. He was promoted in 1838 to the chair of surgery at the Dartmouth Medical School, which position he held until 1841. To this position were added obstetrics and other diseases of women and children. He lectured in these fields for 27 years. Crosby led the successful drive to found a society supporting total abstinence from alcohol at Dartmouth in 1844.

Crosby created a new technique for reducing metacarpophalangeal dislocation. He was the first surgeon to open an abscess at the hip joint.

Crosby was the first surgeon in the United States to be sued for medical malpractice. (Note: "Dixi Crosby was also the first American surgeon to be sued for malpractice".)

== Later life and death ==
Crosby served in the provost marshal's office by day during the Civil War and attended to his medical practice at night. The honorary doctor's degree of LL.D. was given to him by Dartmouth College in 1867. He ultimately turned over his medical lectures in 1868 to his assistant. Crosby retired in 1870 and was appointed emeritus professor of surgery. He lectured them from time to time whenever he desired.

Crosby died at Hanover, New Hampshire, on September 26, 1873.

== Personal ==
Crosby married Mary Jane Moody of Gilmanton, New Hampshire, in 1827. They had two sons. The first son, Albert H. Crosby (1828–1886) of Concord, New Hampshire, became a medical doctor even though he initially trained as a lawyer. The other son, Alpheus Benning Crosby (1832–1877), became a professor of surgery at Dartmouth College.
