= Wentworth, New Hampshire =

- Town
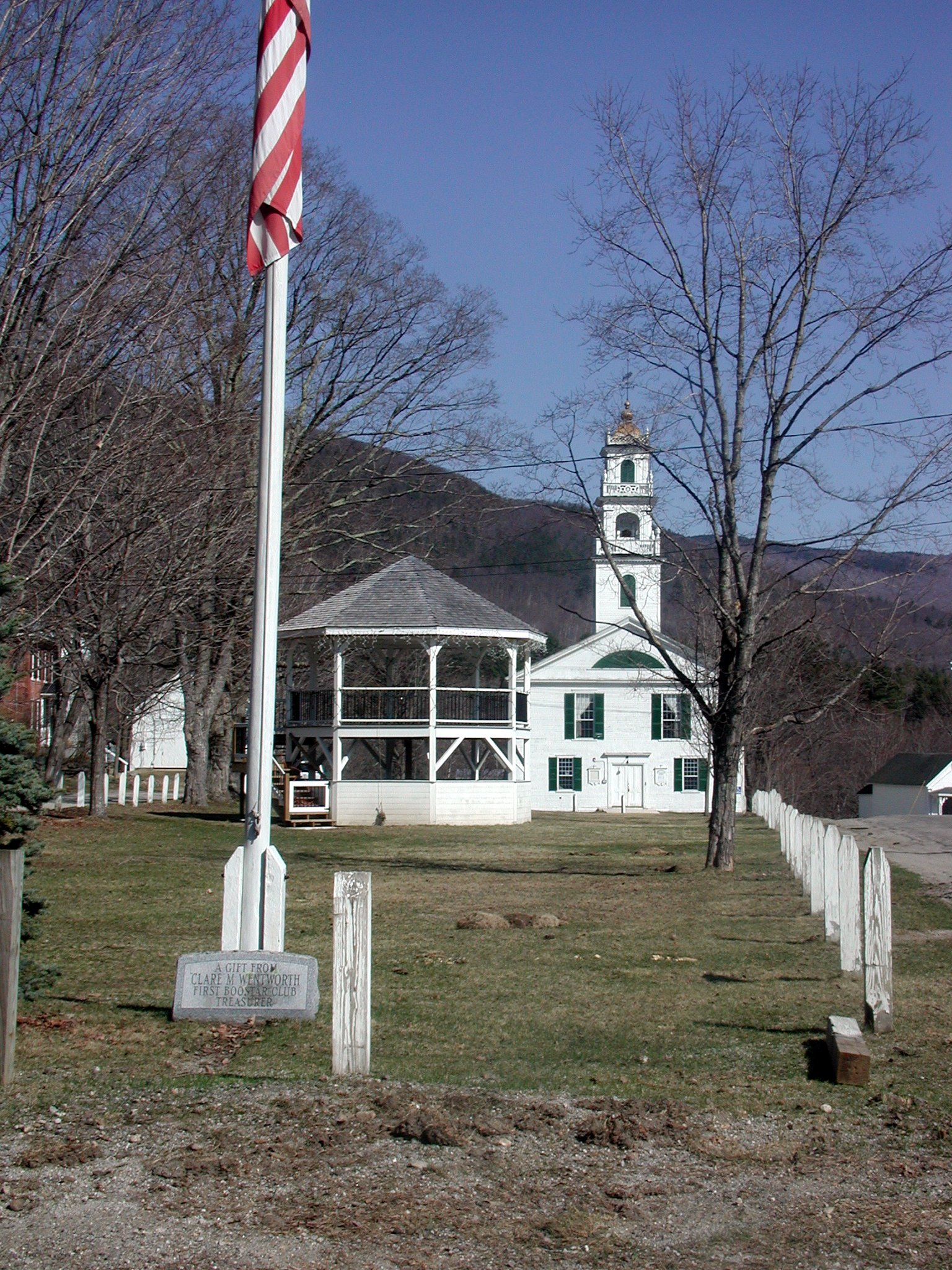
- Wentworth Common

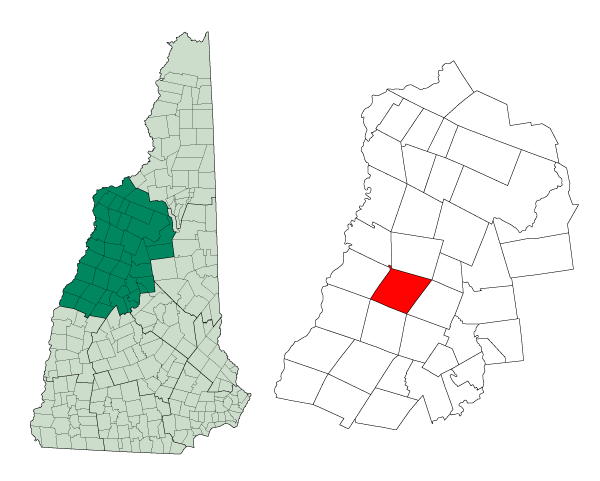
- Location in Grafton County, New Hampshire
- Coordinates: 43°51′36″N 71°55′46″W
- Country: United States
- State: New Hampshire
- County: Grafton
- Incorporated: 1766

Area
  - Total: 42.1 sq mi (109.0 km^{2})
  - Land: 41.6 sq mi (107.7 km^{2})
  - Water: 0.50 sq mi (1.3 km^{2}) 1.22%
- Elevation: 981 ft (299 m)

Population (2020)
  - Total: 845
  - Density: 20/sq mi (7.8/km^{2})
- Time zone: UTC-5 (Eastern)
  - Summer (DST): UTC-4 (Eastern)
- ZIP code: 03282
- Area code: 603
- FIPS code: 33-80500
- GNIS feature ID: 873752
- Website: www.wentworth-nh.org

Wentworth is a town in Grafton County, New Hampshire, United States. The population was 845 at the 2020 census, down from 911 at the 2010 census. The town is home to Plummer's Ledge Natural Area, and part of the White Mountain National Forest is in the northeast.

== History ==
The town was granted by Governor Benning Wentworth on November 1, 1766, to John Page as well as 60 others. Named for the governor himself, Wentworth was settled and incorporated within the same year. Many of the settlers arrived from Massachusetts, particularly Salisbury. Given its location and local environment, the village has been noted by many for its charm since the 19th century; while in "... beauties of landscape, Wentworth has a more than ordinary share."

Farmers cultivated the rich soil on the intervales. The Boston, Concord & Montreal Railroad diagonally crossed the town. With abundant water power from the Baker River, Wentworth developed into a lumber-producing town with nine sawmills. But disaster struck on August 6, 1856, when dams on the Upper and Lower Baker ponds in Orford breached during a flood, releasing a wall of water down Pond Brook to the Baker River. It raced 3 miles (5 km) down the steep, rocky channel, then undermined and washed away Wentworth's riverside mills, houses, barns, sheds and roads. It widened the river by nearly 90 feet (27 m).

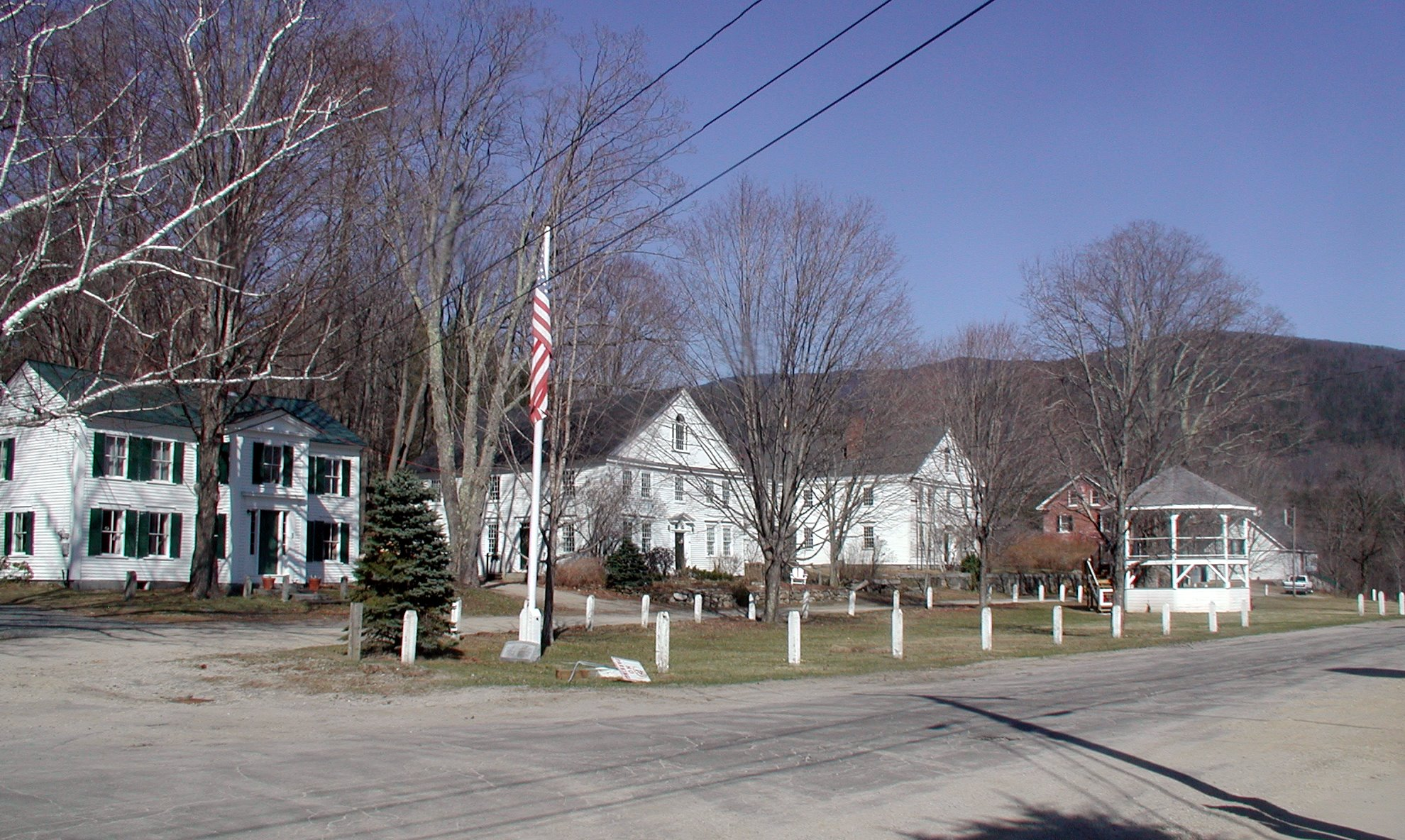
Wentworth Common

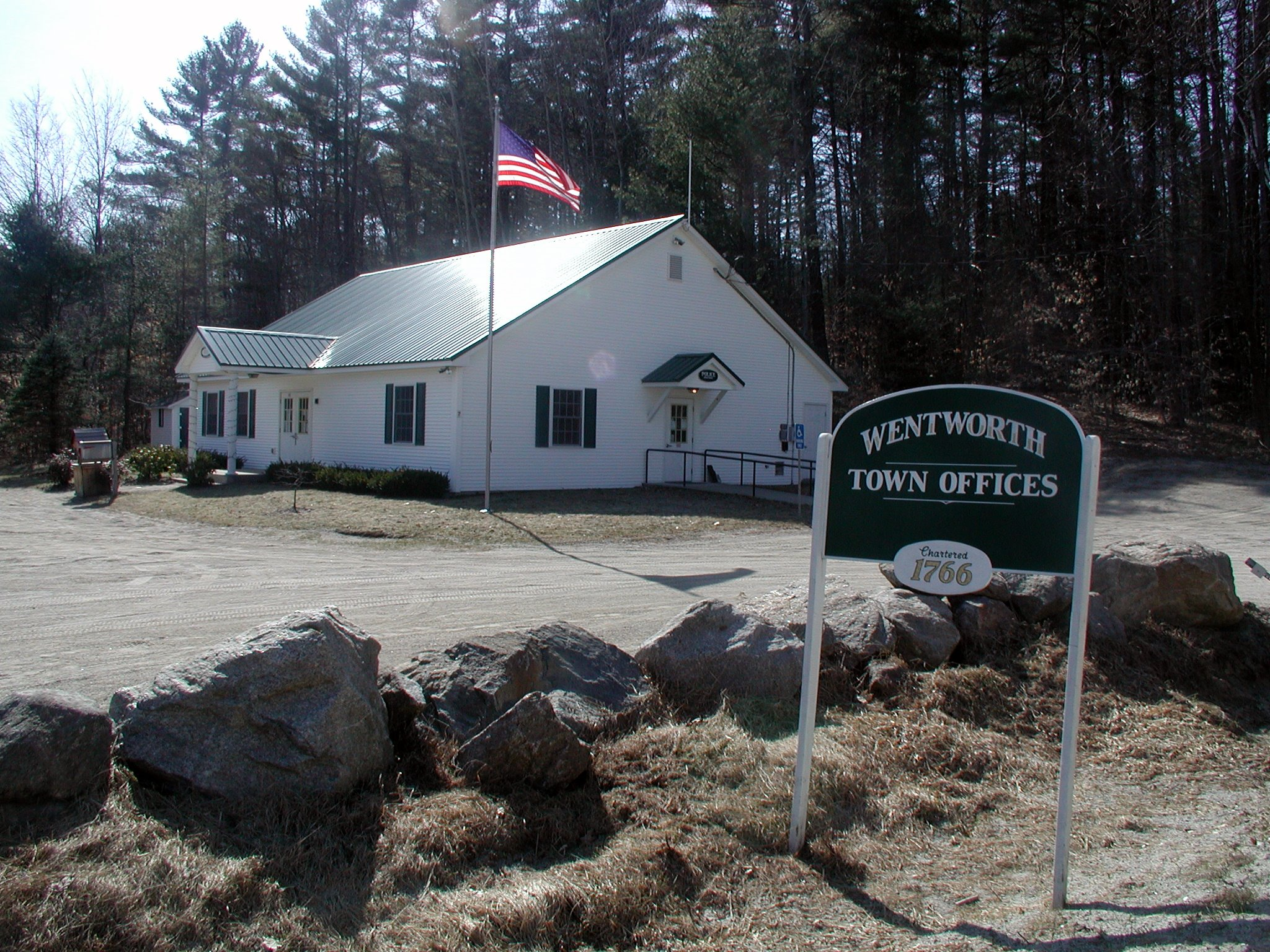
Town offices

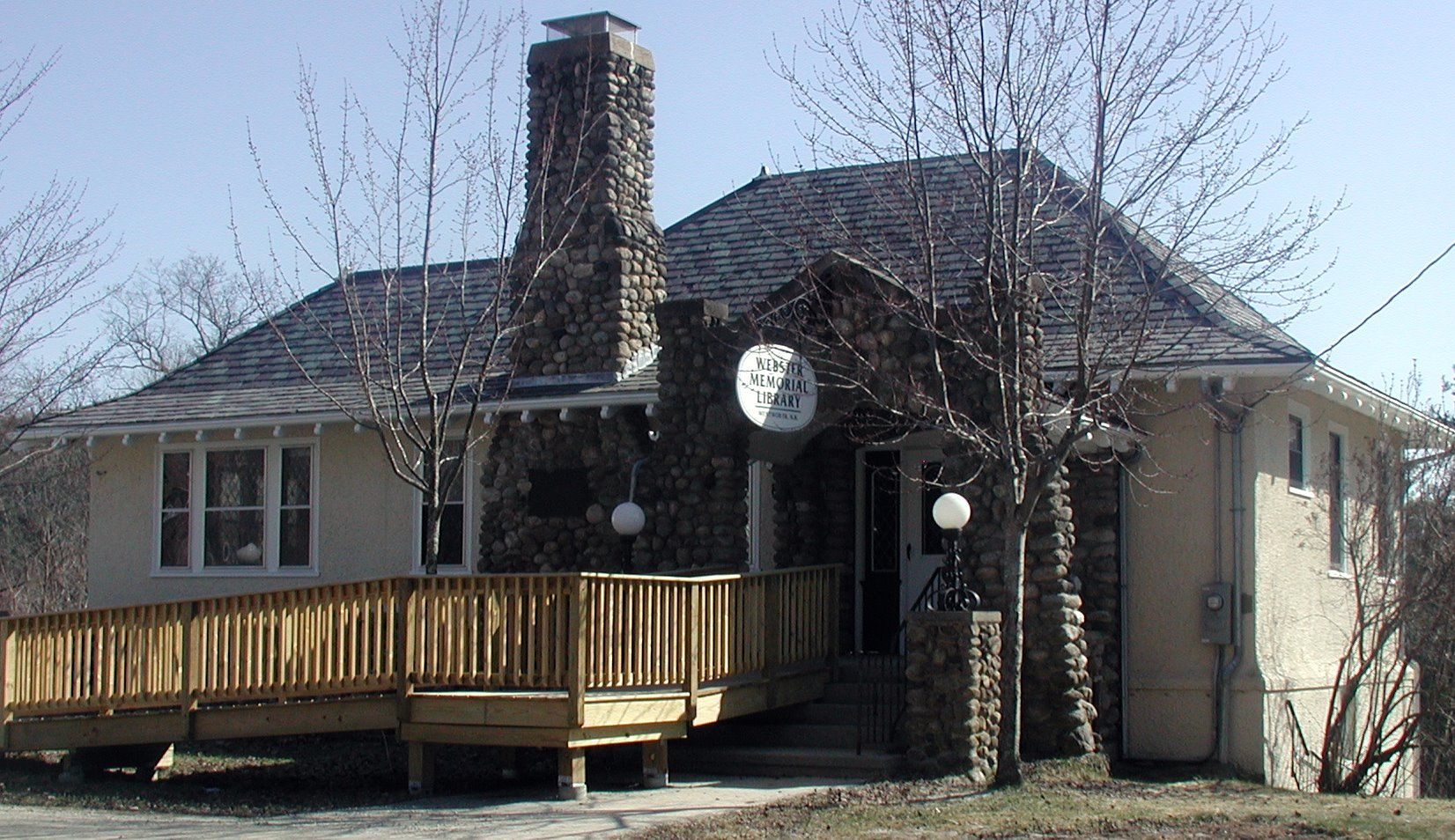
Webster Memorial Library

== Geography ==
According to the United States Census Bureau, the town has a total area of 42.1 square miles (109.0 km^{2}), of which 41.6 square miles (107.7 km^{2}) are land and 0.5 square miles (1.3 km^{2}), or 1.22%, are water. The town is drained by the Baker River and its South Branch, part of the Pemigewasset and Merrimack River watersheds. The highest point in Wentworth is Carr Mountain in the northeast corner of town, at 3,453 feet (1,052 m) above sea level.

The town is crossed north to south by New Hampshire Route 25 and New Hampshire Route 118. New Hampshire Route 25A starts at Routes 25 and 118 at the town center and proceeds west into Orford.

== Demographics ==
Historical population
Census	Pop.	Note	%±
1790	241		—
1800	488		102.5%
1810	645		32.2%
1820	807		25.1%
1830	924		14.5%
1840	1,119		21.1%
1850	1,197		7.0%
1860	1,055		−11.9%
1870	971		−8.0%
1880	939		−3.3%
1890	698		−25.7%
1900	617		−11.6%
1910	595		−3.6%
1920	507		−14.8%
1930	459		−9.5%
1940	491		7.0%
1950	413		−15.9%
1960	300		−27.4%
1970	376		25.3%
1980	527		40.2%
1990	630		19.5%
2000	798		26.7%
2010	911		14.2%
2020	845		−7.2%
U.S. Decennial Census

As of the census of 2000, there were 798 people, 310 households, and 220 families residing in the town. The population density was 19.2 people per square mile (7.4/km^{2}). There were 437 housing units at an average density of 10.5 per square mile (4.1/km^{2}). The racial makeup of the town was 97.62% White, 0.38% African American, 0.25% Asian, 0.13% from other races, and 1.63% from two or more races. Hispanic or Latino of any race were 0.38% of the population.

There were 310 households, out of which 31.9% had children under the age of 18 living with them, 60.0% were married couples living together, 7.4% had a female householder with no husband present, and 29.0% were non-families. 21.3% of all households were made up of individuals, and 8.4% had someone living alone who was 65 years of age or older. The average household size was 2.57 and the average family size was 3.04.

In the town, the population was spread out, with 25.8% under the age of 18, 5.8% from 18 to 24, 29.6% from 25 to 44, 24.7% from 45 to 64, and 14.2% who were 65 years of age or older. The median age was 40 years. For every 100 females, there were 100.4 males. For every 100 females age 18 and over, there were 101.4 males.

The median income for a household in the town was $44,219, and the median income for a family was $47,917. Males had a median income of $31,250 versus $24,500 for females. The per capita income for the town was $18,258. About 6.1% of families and 7.9% of the population were below the poverty line, including 9.7% of those under age 18 and 2.6% of those age 65 or over.

== Government ==
Wentworth uses a town meeting form of government administered by a three-member Board of Selectmen serving staggered three-year terms, with one seat elected each year. In the New Hampshire General Court, Wentworth is in the Grafton 11th and 16th House Districts, represented by Beth Folsom (R) and Jeffrey Greeson (R), respectively. Wentworth is in Senate District 2, represented by Bob Giuda (R).

== Climate ==
According to the Köppen Climate Classification system, Wentworth has a warm-summer humid continental climate, abbreviated "Dfb" on climate maps. The hottest temperature recorded in Wentworth was 98 °F (36.7 °C) on June 20, 2024, while the coldest temperature recorded was −25 °F (−31.7 °C) on January 16–17, 2009.

Climate data for Wentworth, New Hampshire, 1991–2020 normals, extremes 2000–present
Month	Jan	Feb	Mar	Apr	May	Jun	Jul	Aug	Sep	Oct	Nov	Dec	Year
Record high °F (°C)	60 (16)	64 (18)	85 (29)	90 (32)	95 (35)	98 (37)	96 (36)	97 (36)	96 (36)	86 (30)	78 (26)	65 (18)	98 (37)
Mean maximum °F (°C)	46.6 (8.1)	50.7 (10.4)	58.6 (14.8)	73.1 (22.8)	86.4 (30.2)	89.2 (31.8)	90.8 (32.7)	88.9 (31.6)	86.1 (30.1)	73.6 (23.1)	63.8 (17.7)	50.0 (10.0)	92.5 (33.6)
Mean daily maximum °F (°C)	29.4 (−1.4)	33.1 (0.6)	42.2 (5.7)	55.5 (13.1)	68.4 (20.2)	76.6 (24.8)	82.0 (27.8)	80.7 (27.1)	72.5 (22.5)	58.6 (14.8)	46.3 (7.9)	35.2 (1.8)	56.7 (13.7)
Daily mean °F (°C)	18.2 (−7.7)	20.6 (−6.3)	29.8 (−1.2)	42.3 (5.7)	54.3 (12.4)	63.3 (17.4)	68.6 (20.3)	66.9 (19.4)	59.5 (15.3)	46.9 (8.3)	35.8 (2.1)	25.4 (−3.7)	44.3 (6.8)
Mean daily minimum °F (°C)	7.0 (−13.9)	8.0 (−13.3)	17.4 (−8.1)	29.0 (−1.7)	40.1 (4.5)	49.9 (9.9)	55.2 (12.9)	53.1 (11.7)	46.4 (8.0)	35.3 (1.8)	25.3 (−3.7)	15.6 (−9.1)	31.9 (−0.1)
Mean minimum °F (°C)	−11.4 (−24.1)	−8.8 (−22.7)	−0.7 (−18.2)	19.3 (−7.1)	28.3 (−2.1)	38.1 (3.4)	45.5 (7.5)	44.4 (6.9)	32.8 (0.4)	23.3 (−4.8)	12.6 (−10.8)	−0.8 (−18.2)	−15.1 (−26.2)
Record low °F (°C)	−25 (−32)	−24 (−31)	−13 (−25)	5 (−15)	19 (−7)	30 (−1)	42 (6)	38 (3)	26 (−3)	17 (−8)	−4 (−20)	−15 (−26)	−25 (−32)
Average precipitation inches (mm)	2.75 (70)	2.30 (58)	3.01 (76)	3.35 (85)	3.56 (90)	4.12 (105)	4.61 (117)	3.87 (98)	3.62 (92)	4.66 (118)	3.50 (89)	3.55 (90)	42.90 (1,090)
Average snowfall inches (cm)	17.8 (45)	20.2 (51)	13.3 (34)	3.2 (8.1)	0.1 (0.25)	0.0 (0.0)	0.0 (0.0)	0.0 (0.0)	0.0 (0.0)	0.8 (2.0)	3.0 (7.6)	18.1 (46)	76.5 (193.95)
Average extreme snow depth inches (cm)	11.7 (30)	16.7 (42)	13.3 (34)	5.5 (14)	0.1 (0.25)	0.0 (0.0)	0.0 (0.0)	0.0 (0.0)	0.0 (0.0)	0.3 (0.76)	2.6 (6.6)	9.7 (25)	18.2 (46)
Average precipitation days (≥ 0.01 in)	11.7	10.4	9.4	11.4	15.0	16.1	15.7	13.7	11.3	16.6	12.4	13.1	156.8
Average snowy days (≥ 0.1 in)	9.8	9.2	5.8	2.1	0.1	0.0	0.0	0.0	0.0	0.4	2.4	8.5	38.3
Source 1: NOAA
Source 2: National Weather Service

== Photo gallery ==
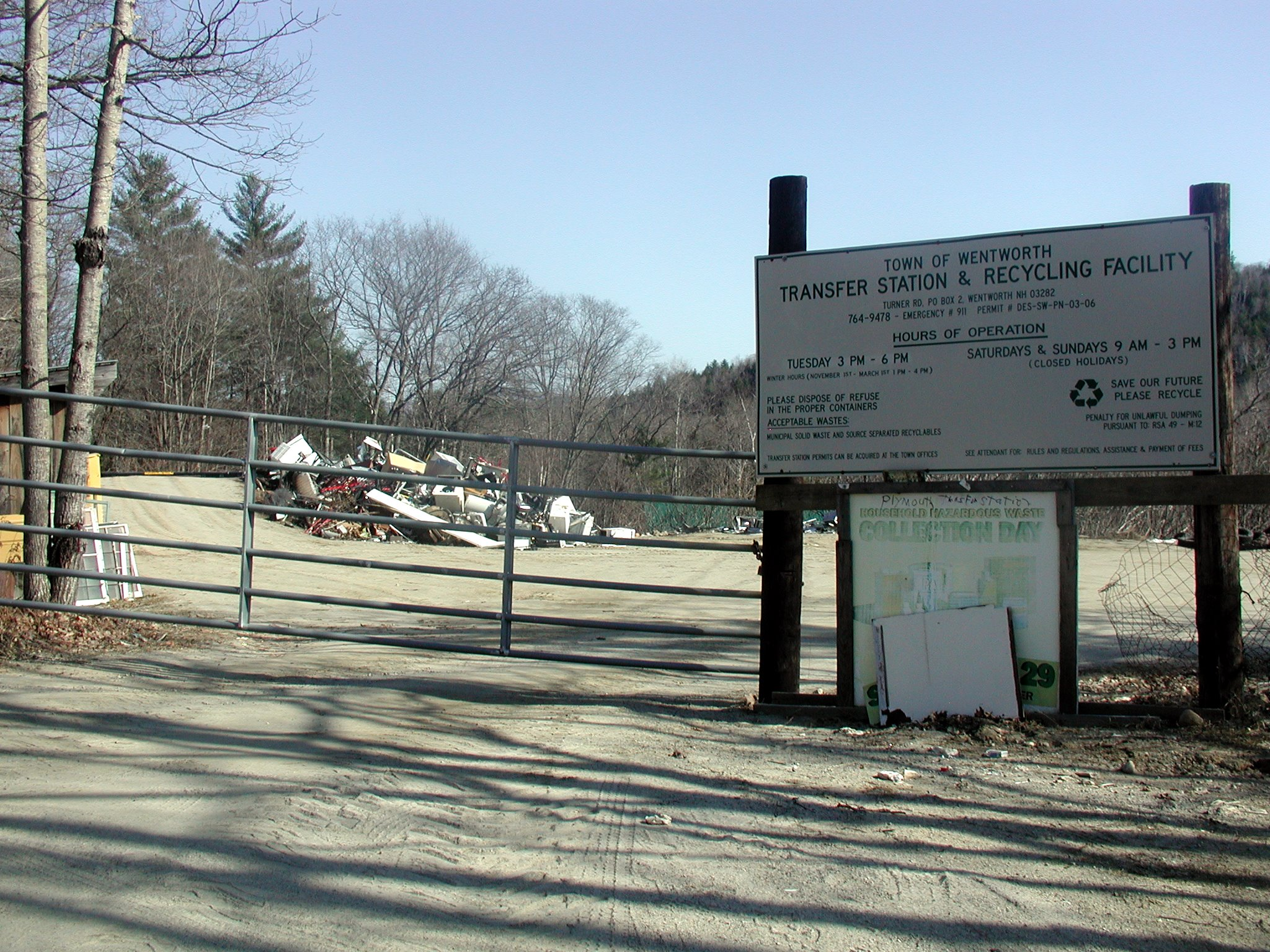
Transfer station

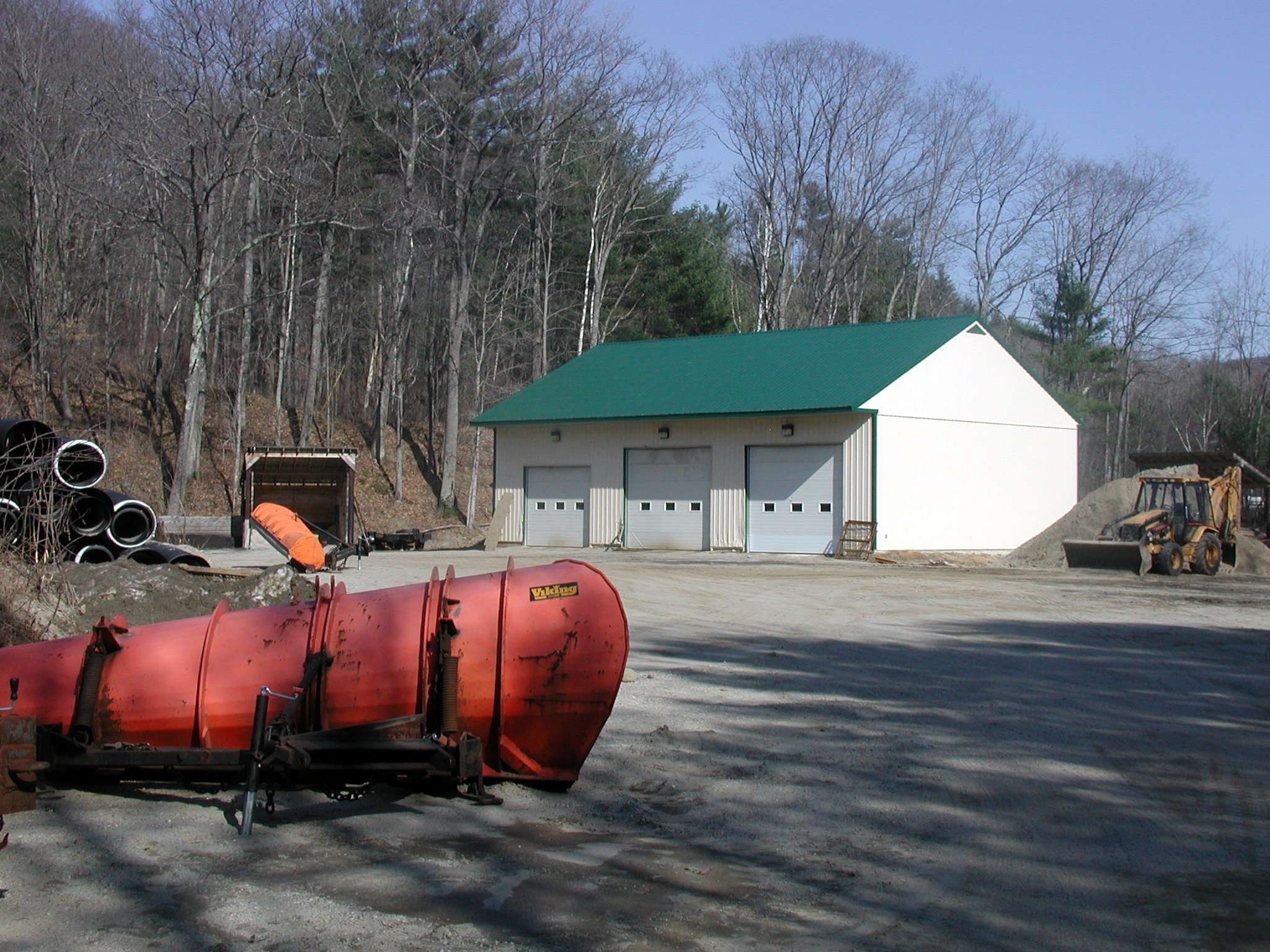
Town garage

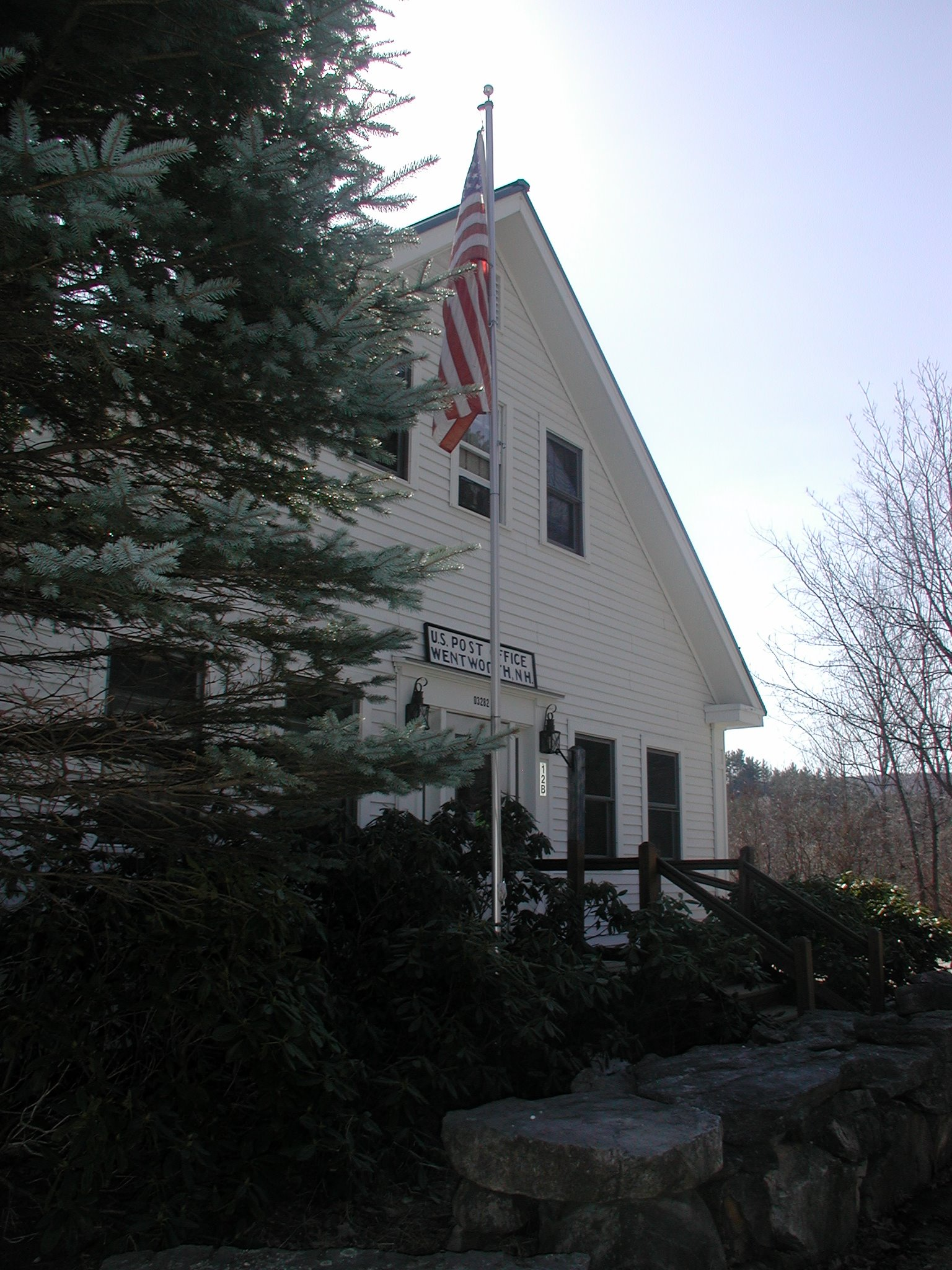
Post office

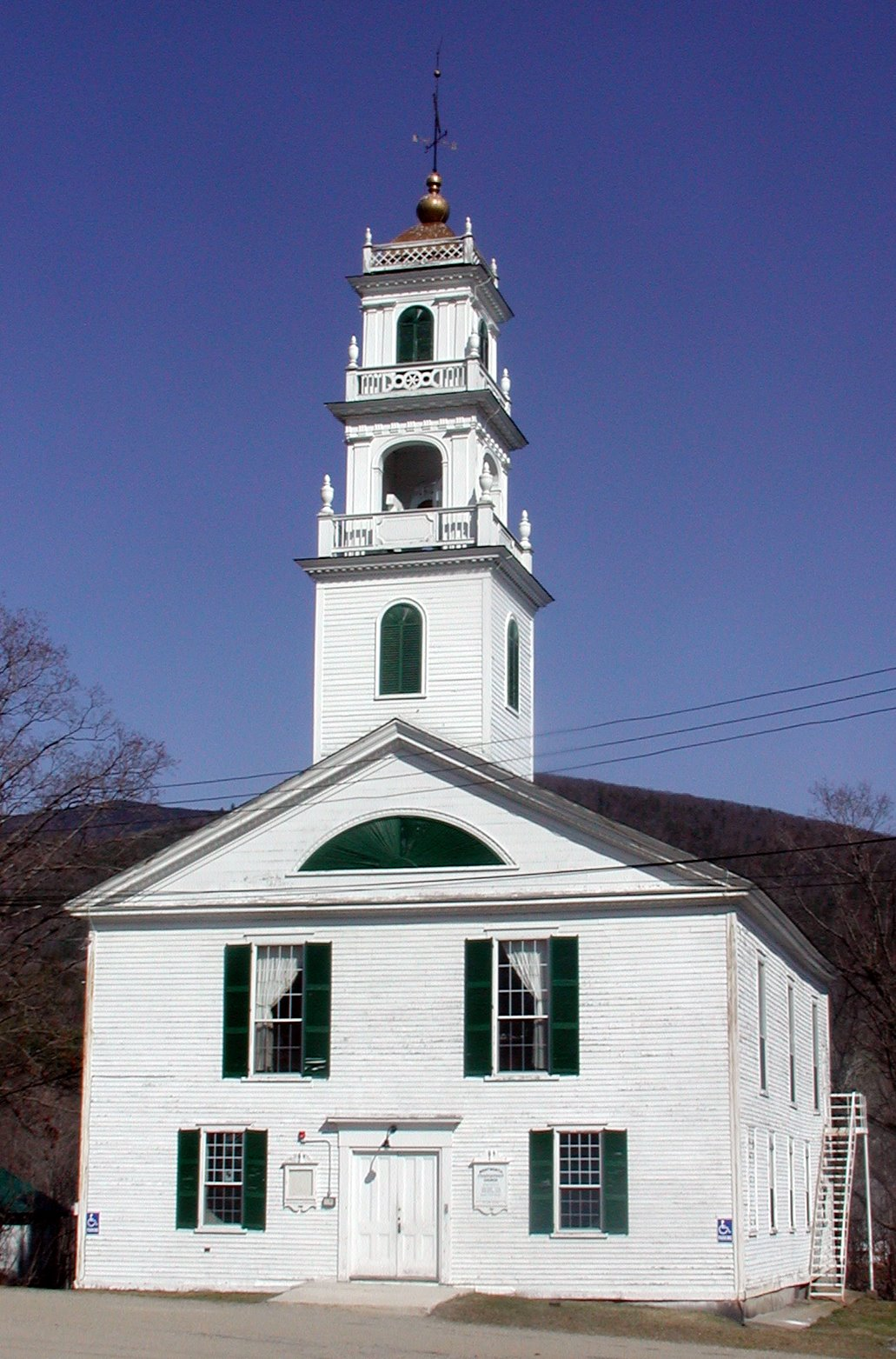
Congregational church

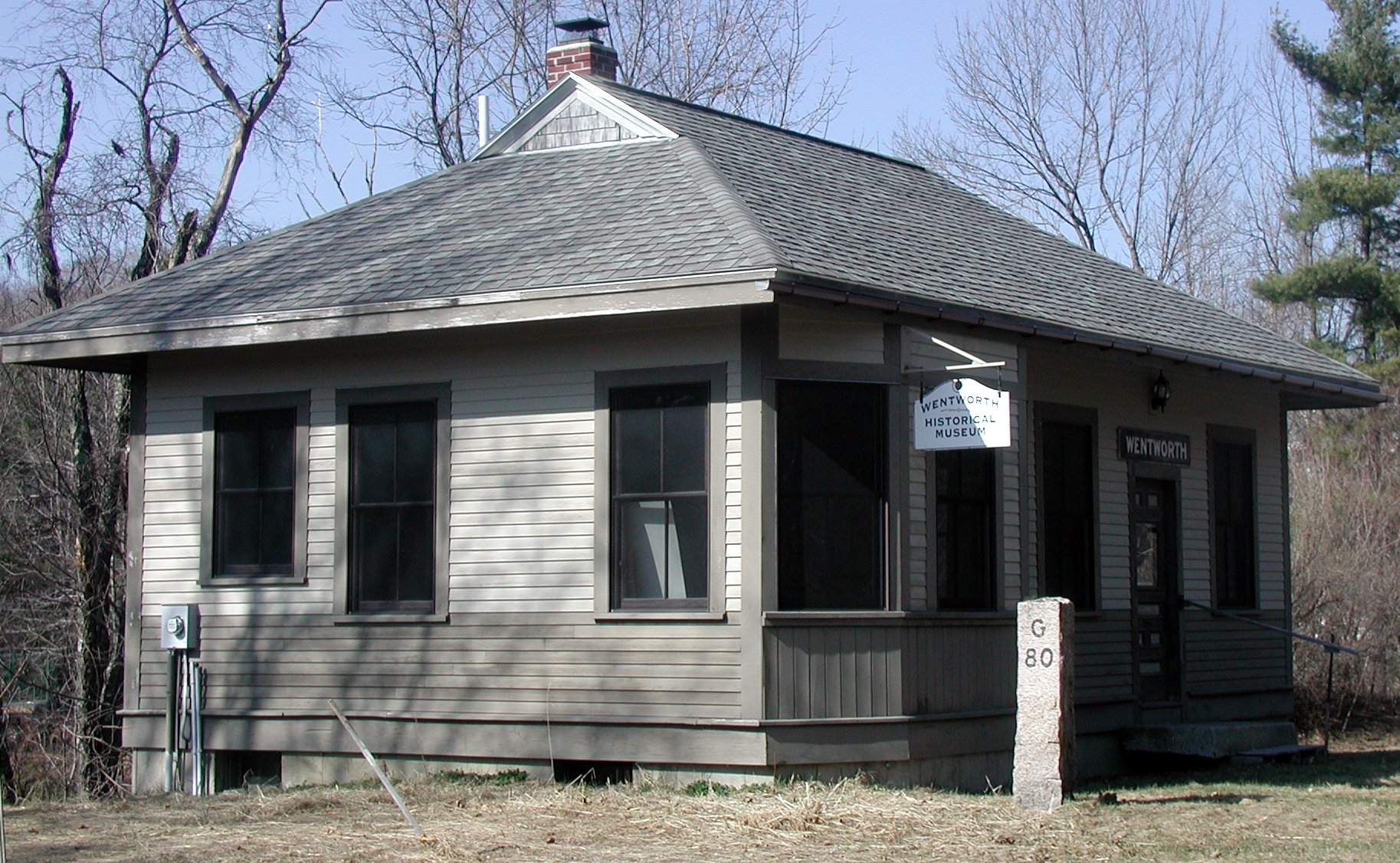
Wentworth Historical Museum

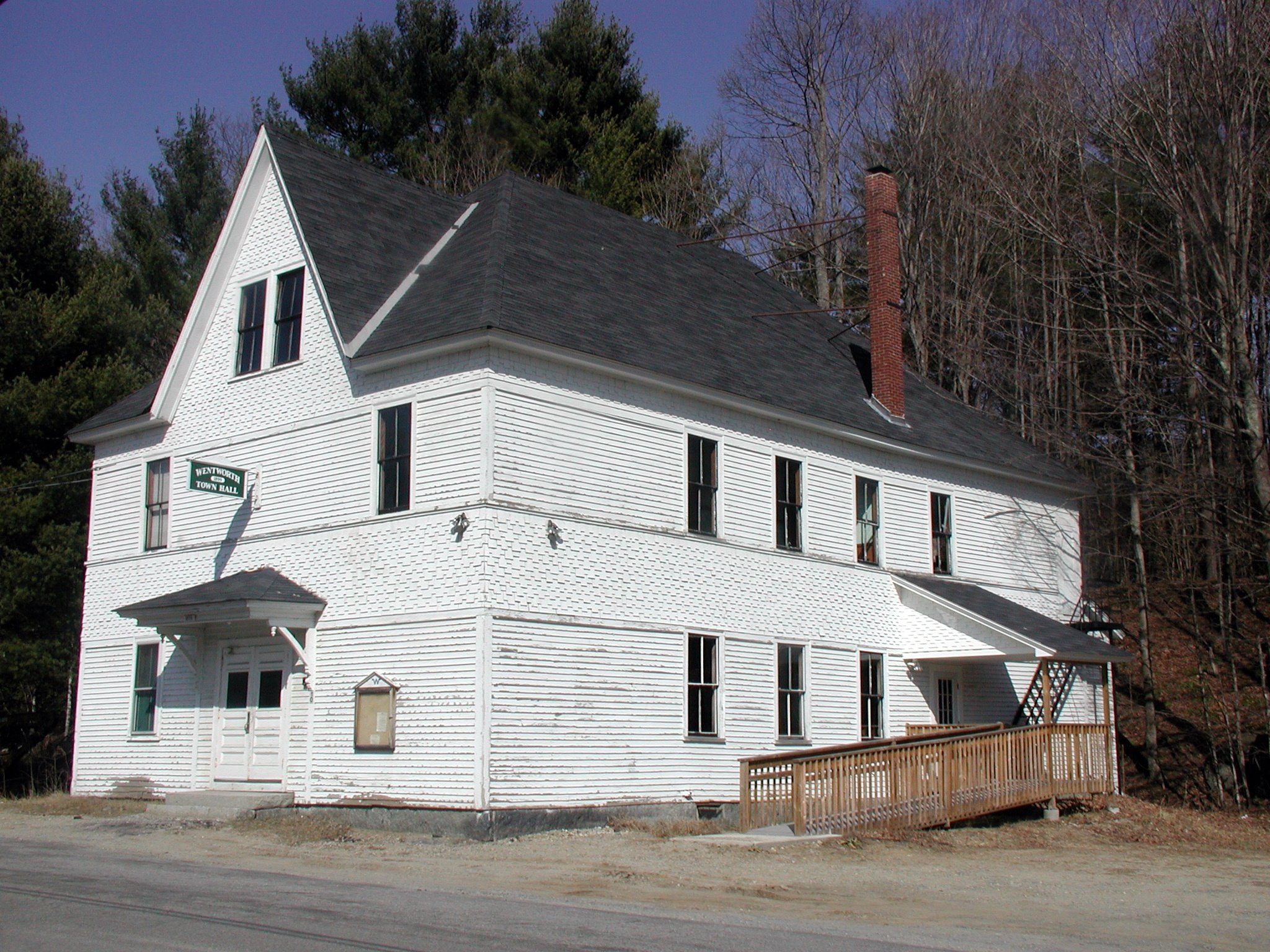
Town Hall

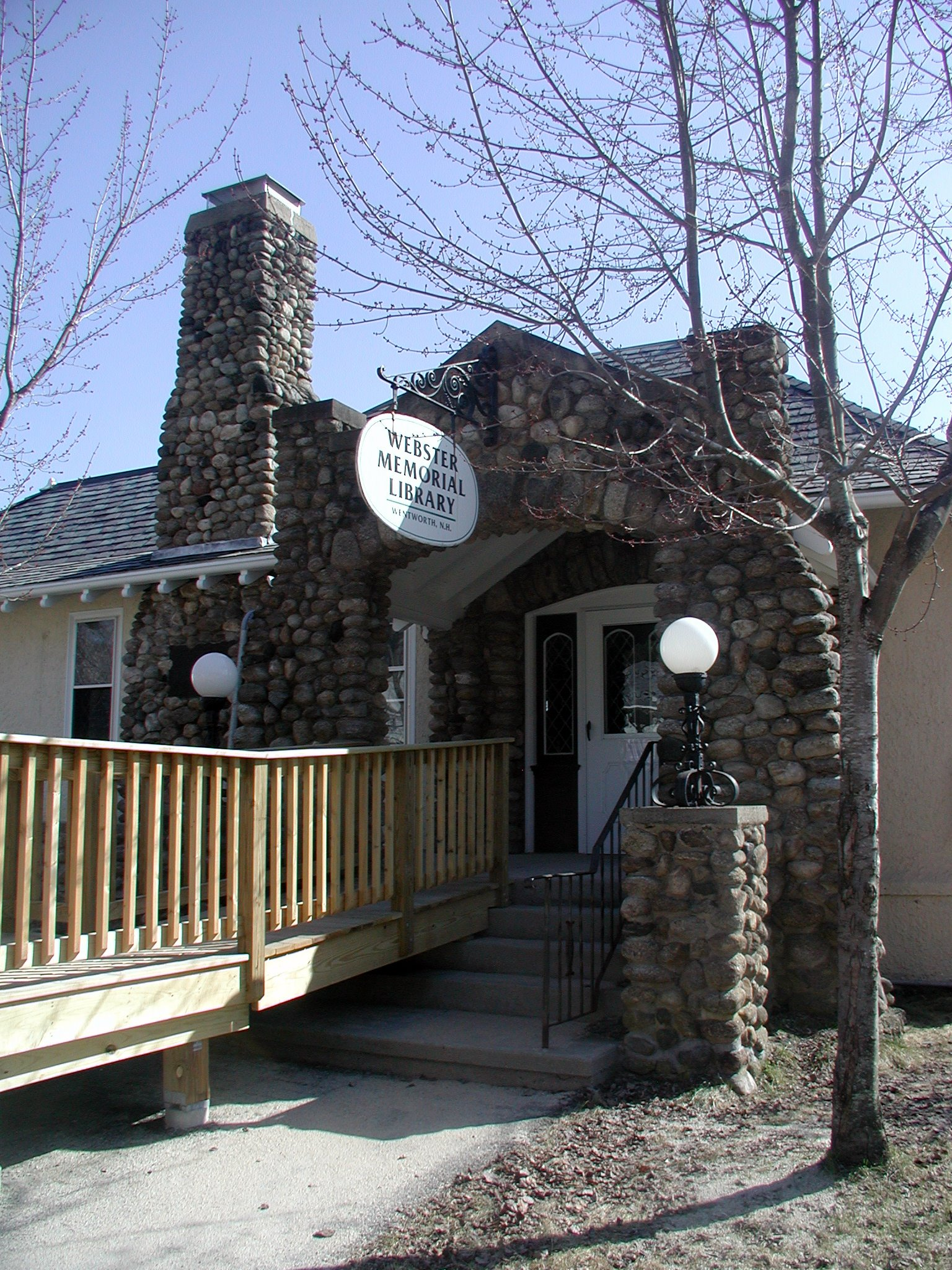
Webster Memorial Library

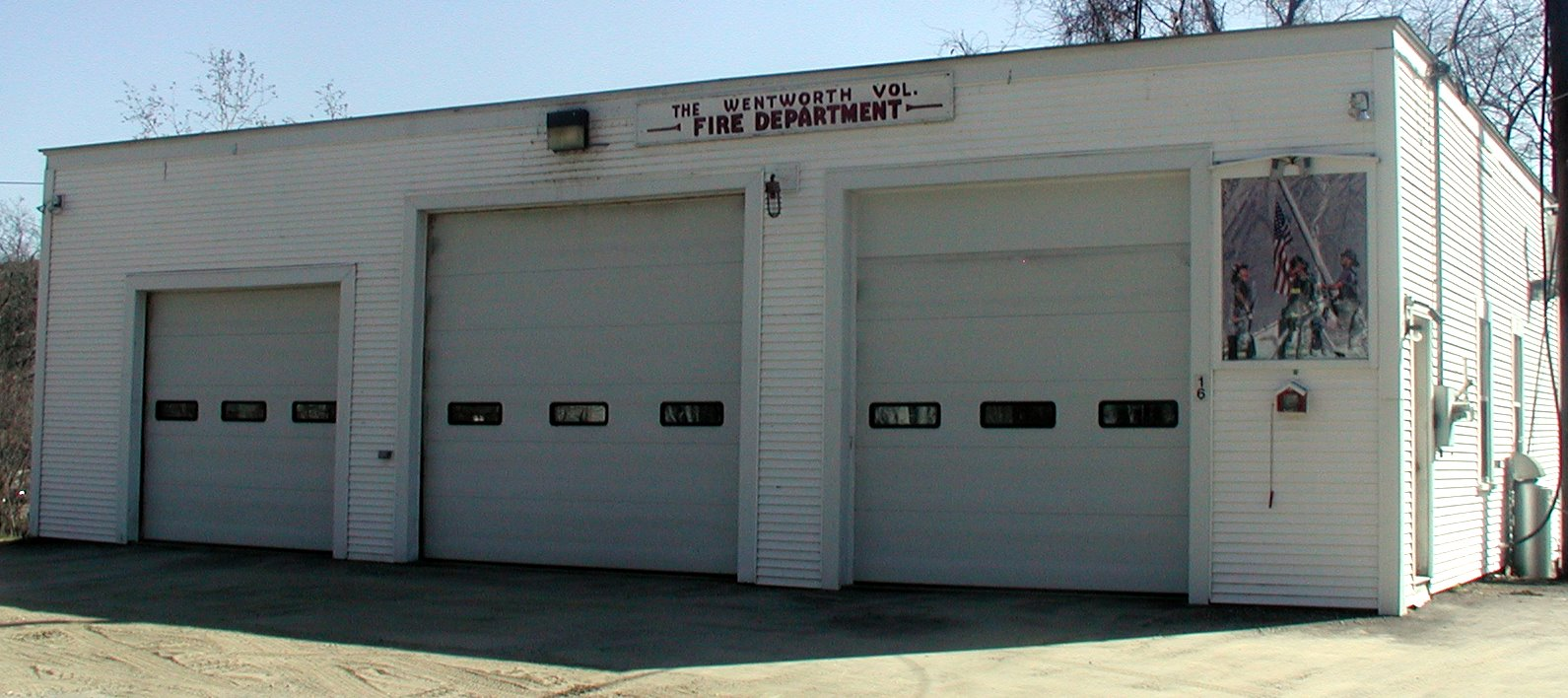
Wentworth Vol. Fire Department

== Notable people ==
- Charles Henry Turner (1861–1913), US congressman
- Thomas Whipple, Jr. (1787–1835), US congressman
