= Gilford High School =

Location
- 88 Alvah Wilson Rd; Gilford, New Hampshire 03249; United States; 43°32′31″N 71°24′14″W

Information
- School type: Public High School
- Founded: 1974
- School district: Gilford School District
- Superintendent: Kirk Beitler
- CEEB code: 300304
- Principal: Anthony Sperazzo
- Staff: 41.00 (FTE)
- Grades: 9–12
- Enrollment: 491 (2023-2024)
- Student to teacher ratio: 11.98
- Language: English
- Colors: Royal Blue and Gold
- Athletics conference: NHIAA; Division III
- Mascot: Golden Eagles
- Rivals: Inter-Lakes High School; Newfound Regional High School; Laconia High School
- Accreditation: NEASC
- Newspaper: Gilford Literary Magazine
- Communities served: Gilford and Gilmanton
- Feeder schools: Gilford Middle School
- Website: ghs.sau73.org
- Last updated: January 1, 2018

Gilford High School (GHS) is the public high school in Gilford, New Hampshire. Accredited by the New England Association of Schools and Colleges, Gilford is a comprehensive public school housing grades 9 through 12, serving the towns of Gilford and Gilmanton.

== Extracurricular activities ==
Student groups and activities include Amnesty International, Bagels & Book Club, Chess Club, Coffeehouse, DECA, Dungeons & Dragons, Environmental Club, French Club, National Honor Society, Prism Club, Robotics Team, Spanish Club, Student Council, Technical Crew, Theatre, Unified Club, Varsity Club, and Youth & Government.

Gilford High School is a member of the New Hampshire Interscholastic Athletic Association in division III. The teams, known as the Golden Eagles, compete in baseball, basketball, cross country, field hockey, football, ice hockey, lacrosse, golf, skiing, soccer, softball, swimming, tennis, track and field, and volleyball.

In the 1990s, the school soccer team, under coach Dave Pinkham, went 9 years without losing a game (the team was state champion each year). Gilford varsity holds many national records including most consecutive championships (10), most consecutive games without a loss (133), and fewest goals allowed in a season (1). During the 2002 season they were also ranked as high as #24 in the nation in the National Soccer Coaches Association of America poll. The Gilford High School volleyball team, under coach Joan Forge, won nine consecutive state championships from 1999 to 2007.

== Notable alumni ==
- David Cote, arts journalist, playwright and opera librettist
- Allie Nault, Miss America's Outstanding Teen, 2016
- Chris Sheridan, television screenwriter for Family Guy
