= New Hampshire Route 109 =

State highway in Carroll County, New Hampshire, US

New Hampshire Route 109
- Map of eastern New Hampshire with NH 109 highlighted in red

Route information
- Maintained by NHDOT
- Length: 41.029 mi (66.030 km)

Major junctions
- South end: SR 109 in Acton, ME
- NH 16 in Wakefield; NH 25 in Moultonborough
- North end: NH 113 in Center Sandwich

Location
- Country: United States
- State: New Hampshire
- Counties: Carroll

Highway system
- New Hampshire Highway System; Interstate; US; State; Turnpikes
← NH 108	→ NH 110

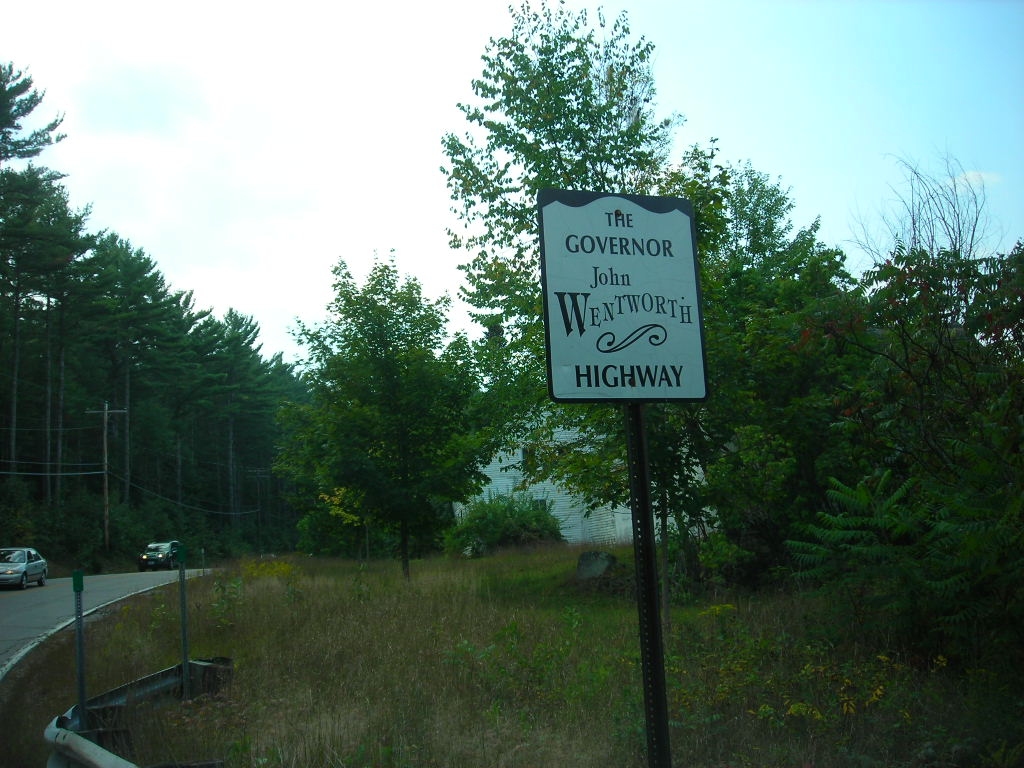
The Governor John Wentworth Highway signage along a segment of NH 109

New Hampshire Route 109 (abbreviated NH 109) is a 41.029-mile-long (66.030 km) north–south highway in Carroll County, New Hampshire. It runs southeast from Sandwich to the Maine border.

The northern terminus of NH 109 is at New Hampshire Route 113 in the village of Center Sandwich in the Lakes Region. The eastern terminus is at the Maine state line in the town of Wakefield, where the road continues as Maine State Route 109, heading toward the town of Acton.

NH 109 between Wolfeboro and Moultonborough is locally known as the Governor Wentworth Highway, with signage reading "The Governor John Wentworth Highway", in reference to Sir John Wentworth, 1st Baronet (1737–1820), who served as provincial governor from 1767 to 1775.

== Major intersections ==
The entire route is in Carroll County.

Location	mi	km	Destinations	Notes
Wakefield	0.000	0.000	SR 109 south – Acton, Sanford	Continuation from Maine
Wakefield	5.267	8.476	NH 153 south (Wakefield Road) – Milton, Rochester	Southern end of concurrency with NH 153
Wakefield	5.455	8.779	NH 153 north (Wakefield Road) – Wakefield Village, Effingham	Village of Sanbornville; northern end of concurrency with NH 153
Wakefield	6.232	10.029	NH 16 (White Mountain Highway) – Rochester, Ossipee	
Wolfeboro	15.232	24.514	NH 28 north (Center Street) – Ossipee	Southern end of wrong-way concurrency with NH 28
Wolfeboro	17.952	28.891	NH 109A north (Elm Street) – Center Tuftonboro	Southern terminus of NH 109A
Wolfeboro	18.416	29.638	NH 28 south (South Main Street) – Alton, Rochester	Northern end of wrong-way concurrency with NH 28
Tuftonboro	27.288	43.916	NH 109A south (Middle Road) – Center Tuftonboro	Northern terminus of NH 109A
Moultonborough	33.558	54.006	NH 171 east (Old Mountain Road) – Ossipee	Western terminus of NH 171
Moultonborough	35.938	57.837	NH 25 east (Whittier Highway) – West Ossipee	Southern end of concurrency with NH 25
Moultonborough	36.537	58.801	NH 25 west (Whittier Highway) – Center Harbor	Northern end of concurrency with NH 25
Sandwich	41.029	66.030	NH 113 (Maple Street / Main Street) – North Sandwich, Holderness	Northern terminus
1.000 mi = 1.609 km; 1.000 km = 0.621 mi: Concurrency terminus

== Suffixed routes ==
New Hampshire Route 109A
- Location: Wolfeboro–Tuftonboro
- Length: 8.743 mi (14.070 km)

New Hampshire Route 109A (abbreviated NH 109A) is an 8.743-mile-long (14.070 km) north–south highway in Carroll County, New Hampshire. The road splits off from New Hampshire Route 109, runs southeast roughly parallel to NH 109, and rejoins NH 109 again. The northern section of NH 109A is locally named Middle Road. The southern section is locally named Pine Hill Road.

The northern terminus of NH 109A is at NH 109 in Tuftonboro. The southern terminus is in Wolfeboro at New Hampshire Route 28 and NH 109.
