= Center Sandwich, New Hampshire =

Census-designated place in New Hampshire, United States

- Census-designated place
- Sandwich Town Hall, 2023

- Location within New Hampshire Location within the United States
- Coordinates: 43°48′30″N 71°26′22″W
- Country: United States
- State: New Hampshire
- County: Carroll
- Town: Sandwich

Area
  - Total: 0.59 sq mi (1.53 km^{2})
  - Land: 0.59 sq mi (1.53 km^{2})
  - Water: 0 sq mi (0.00 km^{2})
- Elevation: 673 ft (205 m)

Population (2020)
  - Total: 156
  - Density: 264.2/sq mi (102.01/km^{2})
- Time zone: UTC-5 (Eastern (EST))
  - Summer (DST): UTC-4 (EDT)
- ZIP code: 03227
- Area code: 603
- FIPS code: 33-10900
- GNIS feature ID: 2629720

Center Sandwich is a census-designated place in the town of Sandwich, New Hampshire, United States. It is the primary settlement in the town and had a population of 156 at the 2020 census. The village center and surrounding area are listed on the National Register of Historic Places as the Center Sandwich Historic District.

The village is home of the Sandwich Fair, held annually in early October.

== History ==
Center Sandwich began as the site of an early gristmill, erected in 1768 by Daniel Beede, which was followed in 1780 by a sawmill, both on the banks of the Red Hill River. Roads were then built to the area, and the village and surrounding rural parts of town grew from about 900 people in 1790 to over 2,000 in 1820. Most of the village's development and growth occurred in the years before the Civil War, resulting in residential and civic buildings that are largely vernacular Federal and Greek Revival in style. Because no railroads were built to serve the area, Center Sandwich declined in importance after the Civil War. Only a small number of changes occurred in the village in the 20th century. The oldest surviving building in the village is the 1792 Baptist church, originally Federal in style, but later given Greek Revival features.

== Geography ==
The CDP is in the south-central part of the town of Sandwich, at the intersection of New Hampshire Route 113 and Route 109. Route 113 leads southwest along the north side of Squam Lake 11 miles (18 km) to Holderness and leads east 13 miles (21 km) to Tamworth. Route 109 begins in Center Sandwich and travels southeast 4.5 miles (7.2 km) to Moultonborough and 22 miles (35 km) to Wolfeboro.

According to the U.S. Census Bureau, the Center Sandwich CDP has a total area of 0.58 square miles (1.5 km^{2}), of which 1,473 square metres (0.364 acres), or 0.1%, are water. The eastern edge of the CDP follows the Red Hill River, a south-flowing tributary of Lake Winnipesaukee.

== Demographics ==
Historical population
Census	Pop.	Note	%±
2010	123		—
2020	156		26.8%
U.S. Decennial Census

As of the census of 2010, there were 123 people, 63 households, and 33 families residing in the CDP. There were 89 housing units, of which 26, or 29.2%, were vacant. 15 of the vacant units were for seasonal or recreational use. The racial makeup of the CDP was 97.6% white, 0.8% Native American, and 1.6% from two or more races. None of the population were Hispanic or Latino of any race.

Of the 63 households in the CDP, 17.5% had children under the age of 18 living with them, 39.7% were headed by married couples living together, 11.1% had a female householder with no husband present, and 47.6% were non-families. 39.7% of all households were made up of individuals, and 30.2% were someone living alone who was 65 years of age or older. The average household size was 1.95, and the average family size was 2.67.

16.3% of residents in the CDP were under the age of 18, 2.4% were from age 18 to 24, 15.4% were from 25 to 44, 34.9% were from 45 to 64, and 30.9% were 65 years of age or older. The median age was 54.8 years. For every 100 females, there were 70.8 males. For every 100 females age 18 and over, there were 58.5 males.

For the period 2011–15, the estimated median annual income for a household was $39,737, and the per capita income for the CDP was $20,130.

== See also ==
- National Register of Historic Places listings in Carroll County, New Hampshire
