= Inter-Lakes Middle High School =

Location
- 1 Laker Lane; Meredith, New Hampshire 03253; United States
- Coordinates: 43°39′58″N 71°29′24″W

Information
- School type: Public High School
- School district: Inter-Lakes School District
- Superintendent: Mary Moriarty
- CEEB code: 300395
- Principal: Amanda Downing
- Grades: 7–12
- Enrollment: 289 (2022-23)
- Language: English
- Colors: Royal Blue and White
- Athletics conference: NHIAA; Division III
- Mascot: Lakers
- Rivals: Franklin High School; Gilford High School; Newfound Regional High School; Moultonborough Academy
- Accreditation: NEASC
- Communities served: Center Harbor, Meredith, and Sandwich, NH
- Feeder schools: Inter-Lakes Middle Tier
- Website: ilmhs.interlakes.org
- Last updated: January 1, 2018

Inter-Lakes Middle High School is a combined middle school and high school in Meredith, New Hampshire. The school serves the towns of Meredith, Center Harbor, and Sandwich.

The school competes in the NHIAA Division 3, and has teams in boys' and girls' cross-country skiing, soccer, cross-country track, basketball, tennis, lacrosse, and outdoor track and field. Girls' teams are offered in softball and volleyball, while boys' teams are offered in baseball, football, ice hockey, and golf. The Inter-Lakes math team competes in the NH Small School Division and the Lakes Region Math League. In 2019 the math team won the league championship and were third in the state. The Inter-Lakes robotics team, The Lakerbots, competed in the FRC New England District Championships in 2021.

Inter-Lakes High School is also home to Inter-Lakes Community Auditorium, which hosts Inter-Lakes Summer Theater during the summer months.
