= Plummer's Ledge Natural Area =

Coordinates: 43°50′06″N 71°53′03″W

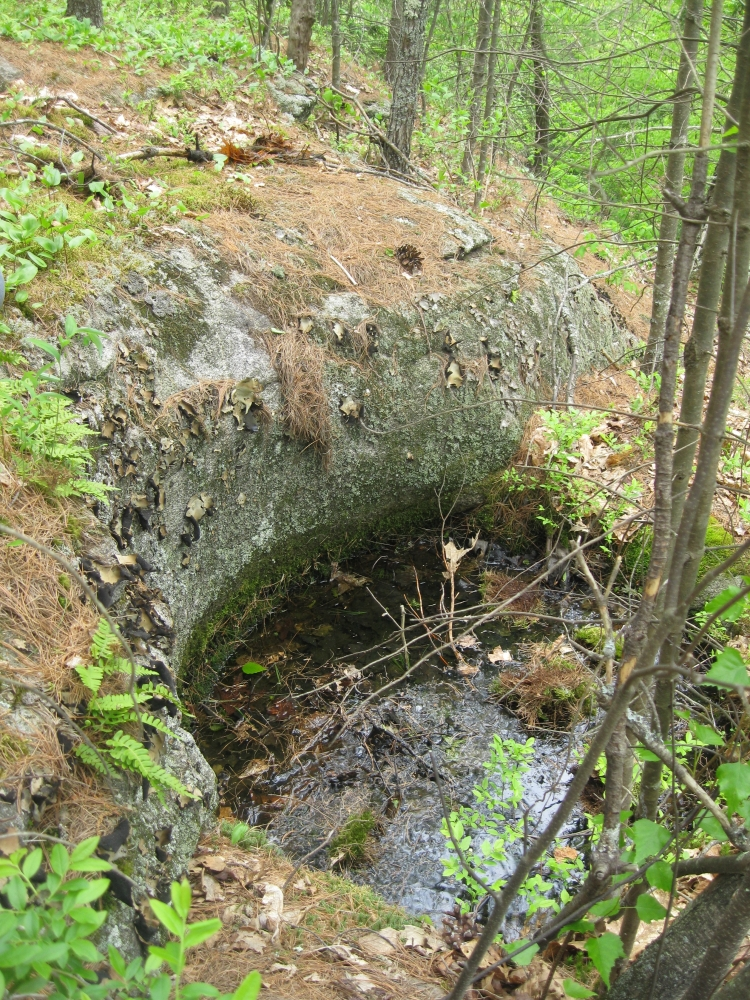
Small glacial pothole at Plummer's Ledge

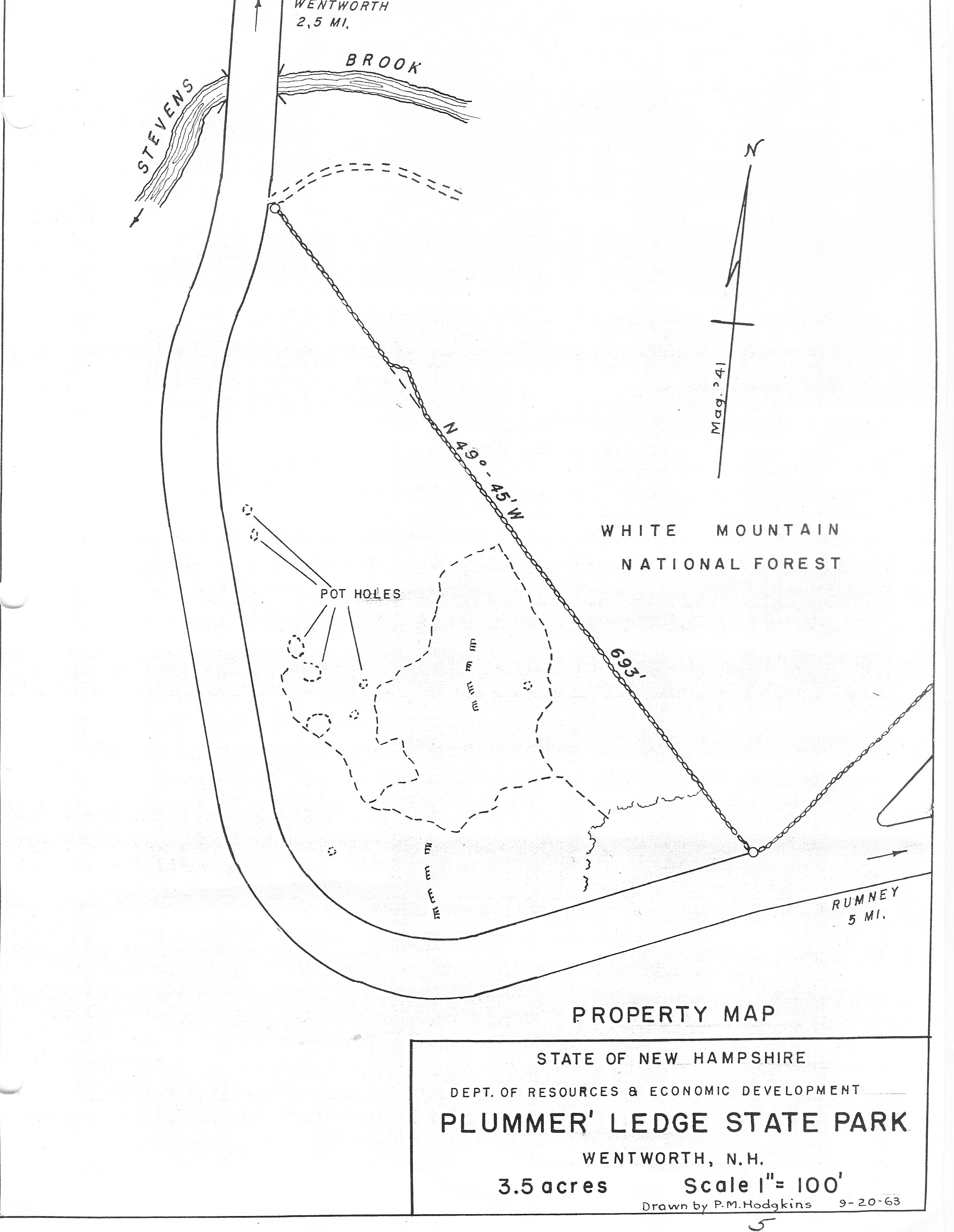
Map of Plummer's Ledge

Plummer's Ledge Natural Area in Wentworth, New Hampshire is a 3.5-acre (1.4 ha) plot of land protected by the State of New Hampshire to preserve unique geologic features called glacial potholes.

Geologists usually account for the isolated potholes, now high and dry, by the plunging of melt water through vertical cracks or crevasses in the glacial ice. These cracks, called moulins, caused water, boulders, cobbles, and gravel to churn with intense cutting power, drilling into the slope of a granite ledge. The three giant potholes at Plummer's Ledge are not only very large and very deep, to 15 feet (4.6 m) across and 20 feet (6.1 m) enclosed depth, but they were cut straight down into a ledge on its 45-degree side slope. The depth is an interesting puzzle. "It is hard to see how either moving or stagnant ice could hold in position a plunging torrent long enough to drill a cylindrical hole ten or more feet deep in rock."

The area was deeded to the State of New Hampshire on May 7, 1938 by George F. Plummer and is administered by the Department of Resources and Economic Development under the Division of Forests and Lands.

The giant potholes are at the foot of a short cliff approximately 75 feet (23 m) east of Buffalo Road, opposite a lumberyard 2.8 miles (4.5 km) from East Side Road in Wentworth village, 1.7 miles (2.7 km) from Sand Hill Road in Rumney. Access is easiest from a grassy area at the side of the road southeast of the potholes. There are traces of an old trail from the northwest corner of this area, uphill and then turning left towards the potholes, but the trail is obscured by many fallen trees; the area is evidently not maintained by the state. Only one of the potholes has been excavated, and since it is filled with water a visitor cannot see its depth.
