= New Hampshire Route 113 =

State highway in New Hampshire, US

New Hampshire Route 113
- Map of eastern New Hampshire with NH 113 highlighted in red. The easternmost section, between Conway and the Maine border, is no longer part of the route.

Route information
- Maintained by NHDOT
- Length: 40.456 mi (65.108 km)

Major junctions
- West end: US 3 / NH 25 in Holderness
- NH 16 in Tamworth; NH 16 / NH 153 in Conway
- East end: US 302 in Conway

Location
- Country: United States
- State: New Hampshire
- Counties: Grafton, Carroll

Highway system
- New Hampshire Highway System; Interstate; US; State; Turnpikes
← NH 112	→ NH 113B

New Hampshire Route 113 (abbreviated NH 113) is a 40.456-mile long (65.108 km) east–west state highway in east-central New Hampshire. NH 113 begins in the Lakes Region at an intersection with U.S. Route 3 and New Hampshire Route 25 in Holderness, and stretches eastward across the central part of the state, ending at an intersection with U.S. Route 302 in Conway, just a few miles west of the Maine border.

== Route description ==
NH 113 is signed as an east-west route, but is oriented in a southwest-northeast fashion. It begins in Holderness, splitting off the Daniel Webster Highway (US 3/NH 25) near Squam Lake. While the D.W. Highway skirts the southern side of the lake, NH 113 heads around the west and north sides of the lake and east into the town of Sandwich, where it meets the northern end of NH 109. Continuing northeast, NH 113A splits off to the north before NH 113 turns east to enter Tamworth, where it joins NH 25 for a short concurrency. NH 113 turns back northeast, intersecting the eastern end of the NH 113A loop before crossing the White Mountain Highway (NH 16) near Chocorua Lake. NH 113 continues eastward into Madison, meeting the northern end of NH 41, and then turns almost due north towards Conway. Shortly after entering Albany, NH 113 once again intersects NH 16, this time forming a concurrency. After a short trip through the extreme corner of Albany, the conjoined routes enter Conway. Along the way the two routes meet the eastern end of the Kancamagus Highway (NH 112). In downtown Conway, NH 113 splits eastward from NH 16 just after intersecting the northern end of NH 153. While NH 16 continues northward towards North Conway, NH 113 heads east towards Center Conway as East Main Street. After about 1.5 miles (2.4 km), it reaches its eastern terminus at US 302. East Main Street continues as US 302 towards the Maine state border.

== History ==
The historic eastern terminus of NH 113 as signed was at the Maine state line, along current US 302. From Center Conway, NH 113 was cosigned with US 302 and abruptly ended at the state line. Aside from this concurrency being redundant, the signage was potentially confusing, as US 302 intersects Maine State Route 113 just 1.1 miles (1.8 km) east of the state line.

By fall 2015, new signage indicated that NH 113 had been truncated to end at US 302 at their junction in Center Conway. Between this intersection and the Maine state line, East Main Street is signed solely as US 302.

Maine State Route 113 is unrelated to NH 113, though the former does cross into New Hampshire and runs briefly within East Conway. At their closest, the routes lie within 4.5 miles (7.2 km) of each other.

NH 113 west leaving village of Center Sandwich

== Major intersections ==
County	Location	mi	km	Destinations	Notes
Grafton	Holderness	0.000	0.000	US 3 / NH 25 (Daniel Webster Hwy.) to NH 175 – Meredith, Ashland	Western terminus
Carroll	Sandwich	11.723	18.866	NH 109 south (Main Street) – Moultonborough, Wolfeboro	Northern terminus of NH 109
Carroll	Sandwich	15.420	24.816	NH 113A east (Whiteface Road) – Wonalancet	Western terminus of NH 113A
Carroll	Tamworth	19.324	31.099	NH 25 west (Bearcamp Highway) – Moultonborough, Meredith	Western end of concurrency with NH 25
Carroll	Tamworth	22.174	35.686	NH 25 east (Bearcamp Highway) – Ossipee, Freedom	Eastern end of concurrency with NH 25
Carroll	Tamworth	24.574	39.548	NH 113A west (Chinook Trail) – Wonalancet	Eastern terminus of NH 113A
Carroll	Tamworth	27.513	44.278	NH 16 (White Mountain Hwy.) – Ossipee, Conway	
Carroll	Madison	29.932	48.171	NH 41 south (Plains Road) – Ossipee	Northern terminus of NH 41
Carroll	Albany	36.498	58.738	NH 16 south (White Mountain Hwy.) – Tamworth, Ossipee	Western end of concurrency with NH 16
Carroll	Conway	37.642	60.579	NH 112 west (Kancamagus Hwy.) – Lincoln, Woodstock	Eastern terminus of NH 112
Carroll	Conway	38.395	61.791	NH 153 south (Pleasant Street) – Eaton, Freedom	Northern terminus of NH 153
Carroll	Conway	38.467	61.907	NH 16 north (White Mountain Hwy.) – North Conway, Glen	Eastern end of concurrency with NH 16
Carroll	Conway	40.456	65.108	US 302 (Eastman Road) – Center Conway, Fryeburg, ME	Eastern terminus
1.000 mi = 1.609 km; 1.000 km = 0.621 mi: Concurrency terminus

== Suffixed routes ==
=== New Hampshire Route 113A ===
New Hampshire Route 113A
- Location: Sandwich–Tamworth
- Length: 13.222 mi (21.279 km)

New Hampshire Route 113A is a 13.222-mile-long (21.279 km) loop road in Carroll County, New Hampshire. The highway splits from NH 113 in Tamworth, loops around to the north, west and south, then rejoins NH 113 again in the town of Sandwich. The road provides access to Hemenway State Forest in the White Mountains area of New Hampshire.

The eastern terminus of NH 113A is in Tamworth at NH 113. In this area, the highway is named Chinook Trail. The western terminus is at NH 113 in Sandwich, where the road is named Whiteface Road.

Along the route NH 113A passes through the village of Wonalancet in Tamworth and Whiteface and North Sandwich in Sandwich.

=== New Hampshire Route 113B ===
New Hampshire Route 113B
- Location: Chatham, NH–Stow, ME
- Length: 3.95 mi (6.36 km)

New Hampshire Route 113B (NH 113B), despite its designation, is not a loop road of NH 113. The route, which never intersects nor comes close to NH 113, is a loop of Maine State Route 113, but lies almost entirely within New Hampshire, producing the very unusual situation of one state having a suffixed route off another state's highway.

Both ends of the highway are located in the town of Stow, Maine, while most of the route (2.961 miles (4.765 km)) runs in Chatham, New Hampshire. It retains the NH 113B designation in both states.

NH 113B is one of two New Hampshire routes (the other being NH 153) which cross into Maine but retain their designations. North of NH 113B's northern terminus, SR 113 immediately crosses into New Hampshire for a couple of miles while retaining its own designation.

== See also ==
- Maine State Route 113, which crosses into New Hampshire twice.
