= North Sandwich, New Hampshire =

Unincorporated community in New Hampshire, United States

- Unincorporated community
- Sign at village center

- Location within New Hampshire Location within the United States
- Coordinates: 43°50′26″N 71°23′50″W
- Country: United States
- State: New Hampshire
- County: Carroll
- Town: Sandwich
- Elevation: 682 ft (208 m)
- Time zone: UTC-5 (Eastern (EST))
  - Summer (DST): UTC-4 (EDT)
- ZIP code: 03259
- Area code: 603
- GNIS feature ID: 872406

North Sandwich is an unincorporated community in the town of Sandwich in Carroll County, New Hampshire. It is located at the junction of New Hampshire Routes 113 and 113A, 3.6 miles (5.8 km) northeast of Center Sandwich. Route 113 continues east into Tamworth, while Route 113A travels north to Wonalancet.

North Sandwich has a separate ZIP code (03259) from other areas in the town of Sandwich.
