= Sandwich, New Hampshire =

- Town
- Along NH Route 109 at top of Wentworth Hill

- Seal

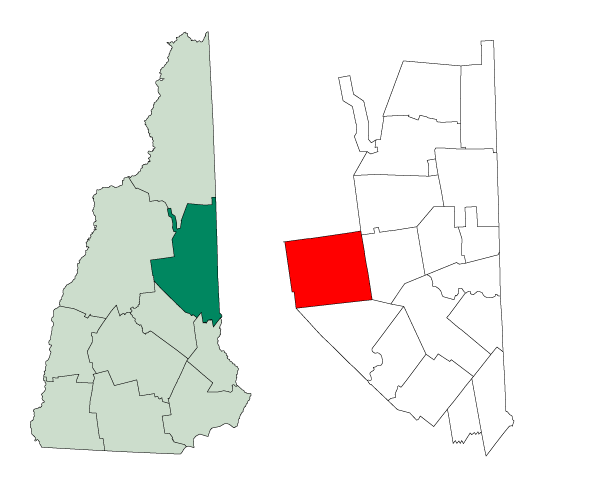
- Location in Carroll County, New Hampshire
- Coordinates: 43°48′27″N 71°26′21″W
- Country: United States
- State: New Hampshire
- County: Carroll
- Incorporated: 1763
- Villages: Center Sandwich; North Sandwich; Sandwich; Whiteface

Area
  - Total: 94.1 sq mi (243.8 km^{2})
  - Land: 90.9 sq mi (235.4 km^{2})
  - Water: 3.3 sq mi (8.5 km^{2}) 3.47%
- Elevation: 853 ft (260 m)

Population (2020)
  - Total: 1,466
  - Density: 16/sq mi (6.2/km^{2})
- Time zone: UTC-5 (Eastern)
  - Summer (DST): UTC-4 (Eastern)
- ZIP Codes: 03227 (Center Sandwich); 03259 (North Sandwich); 03883 (South Tamworth); 03886 (Tamworth); 03254 (Moultonborough)
- Area code: 603
- FIPS code: 33-67780
- GNIS feature ID: 873717
- Website: sandwichnh.org

Sandwich is a town in Carroll County, New Hampshire, United States. Its population was 1,466 at the 2020 census, and an estimated 1,548 in 2025. Sandwich includes the villages of Center Sandwich and North Sandwich. Part of the White Mountain National Forest is in the north, and part of Squam Lake is in the southwestern corner of the town. As such, Sandwich lies on the boundary between New Hampshire's Lakes Region and White Mountains Region. The Sandwich Range of the White Mountains lies partially within the town, as does the namesake Sandwich Mountain. The town is home to the Sandwich Fair, a popular agricultural fair that occurs every October.

== History ==
Chartered in 1763 by colonial Governor Benning Wentworth, the land was considered so inaccessible that the grant was enlarged, making Sandwich one of the largest towns in the state. It was named in honor of John Montagu, 4th Earl of Sandwich, said to be the inventor of the sandwich.

The earliest European settlers arrived in 1767. By 1830 Sandwich had grown to a population of 2,700, nearly double the current (2020) population. At that time the town contained farms, stores, mills, churches, schools, carpenters, blacksmiths, and wheelwrights.

By the end of the 1800s much of the population had left Sandwich to live in cities to the west. Sandwich began to be an attraction for visitors, summer residents and artists, which continues to this day.

The League of New Hampshire Craftsmen began in Sandwich as "Sandwich Home Industries" in 1920, and continues statewide today. Each fall the town hosts the Sandwich Fair. The Durgin Bridge, built in 1864, is a covered bridge in the eastern section of town.

== Geography ==
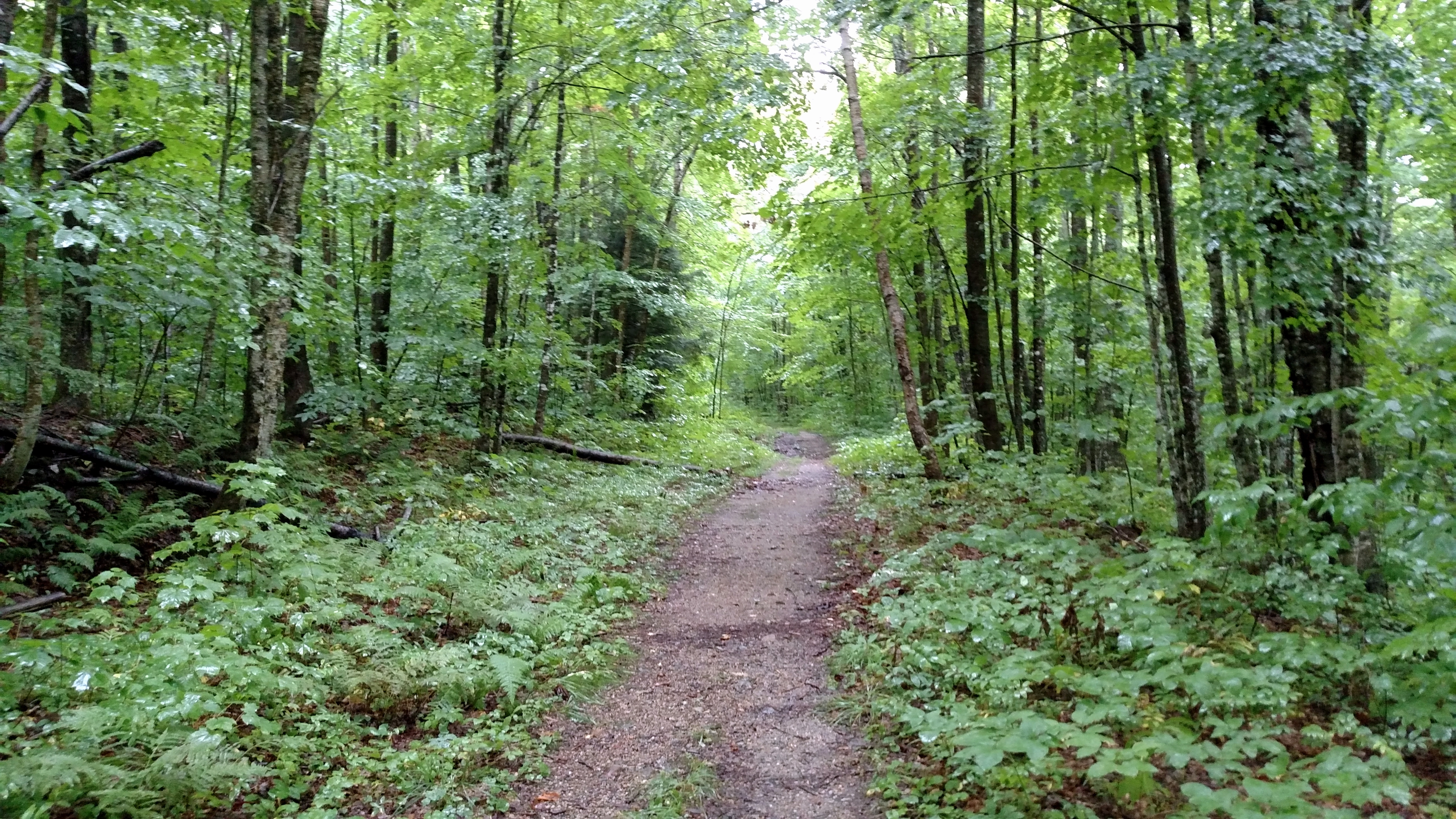
Guinea Pond Trail in the White Mountain National Forest

According to the United States Census Bureau, the town has a total area of 94.1 square miles (243.8 km^{2}), of which 90.9 square miles (235.4 km^{2}) are land and 3.3 square miles (8.5 km^{2}) are water, comprising 3.47% of the town. Sandwich is drained to the east by the Bearcamp and Cold rivers, to the northwest by the Beebe River, to the southwest by Squam Lake, and to the south by the Red Hill River. The Bearcamp and Cold rivers are part of the Saco River watershed, draining east into Maine, while the remainder of the town is part of the Merrimack River watershed, draining south to Massachusetts.

The White Mountain National Forest occupies the northwestern quadrant of the town, as well as a strip of land along the town's northern border. Mount Israel, elevation 2,630 feet (802 m) above sea level, is within the national forest close to the geographic center of the town. Part of the Squam Mountains is in the west. Part of the Sandwich Range is in the north, including the 3,993-foot (1,217 m) Sandwich Mountain (also known as Sandwich Dome), the highest point in town as well as in Carroll County.

The primary settlement in the town is Center Sandwich. Other villages include Sandwich, North Sandwich, and Whiteface.

== Demographics ==
Historical population
Census	Pop.	Note	%±
1790	905		—
1800	1,413		56.1%
1810	2,232		58.0%
1820	2,368		6.1%
1830	2,743		15.8%
1840	2,625		−4.3%
1850	2,577		−1.8%
1860	2,227		−13.6%
1870	1,854		−16.7%
1880	1,701		−8.3%
1890	1,303		−23.4%
1900	1,077		−17.3%
1910	928		−13.8%
1920	1,175		26.6%
1930	731		−37.8%
1940	742		1.5%
1950	615		−17.1%
1960	620		0.8%
1970	666		7.4%
1980	905		35.9%
1990	1,066		17.8%
2000	1,286		20.6%
2010	1,326		3.1%
2020	1,466		10.6%
2024 (est.)	1,544		5.3%
U.S. Decennial Census

As of the census of 2010, there were 1,326 people, 617 households, and 405 families residing in the town. There were 1,057 housing units, of which 440, or 41.6%, were vacant. 373 of the vacant units were for seasonal or recreational use. The racial makeup of the town was 98.0% white, 0.2% African American, 0.2% Native American, 0.5% Asian, 0.1% Native Hawaiian or Pacific Islander, 0.0% some other race, and 1.1% from two or more races. 0.5% of the population were Hispanic or Latino of any race.

Of the 617 households, 19.3% had children under the age of 18 living with them, 55.1% were headed by married couples living together, 7.9% had a female householder with no husband present, and 34.4% were non-families. 27.4% of all households were made up of individuals, and 13.9% were someone living alone who was 65 years of age or older. The average household size was 2.15, and the average family size was 2.59.

In the town, 16.3% of the population were under the age of 18, 3.8% were from 18 to 24, 15.9% from 25 to 44, 40.9% from 45 to 64, and 23.2% were 65 years of age or older. The median age was 53.2 years. For every 100 females, there were 96.4 males. For every 100 females age 18 and over, there were 93.7 males.

For the period 2011–2015, the estimated median annual income for a household was $57,000, and the median income for a family was $63,824. Male full-time workers had a median income of $57,917 versus $40,804 for females. The per capita income for the town was $31,599. 10.0% of the population and 7.3% of families were below the poverty line. 22.3% of the population under the age of 18 and 5.3% of those 65 or older were living in poverty.

== Transportation ==
Four New Hampshire state highways cross the town:

- NH 25 crosses the town's southeastern corner, from Moultonborough in the south to Tamworth in the east. It is locally known as Whittier Highway.
- NH109 enters from Moultonborough in the south and terminates in the Center Sandwich, near the fairgrounds, at NH 113. It is known locally as Wentworth Hill Road.
- NH 113 is the main east–west route across town, entering from Holderness in the west, where it is known as Holderness Road. In Center Sandwich, it becomes Main Street, and at the northern terminus of NH 109, it turns north along Maple Street. The name changes to North Sandwich Road until the village of North Sandwich, where it turns onto Beede Flats Road before entering Tamworth to the east.
- NH 113A has its western terminus in North Sandwich at NH 113, then goes north along Whiteface Road before turning hard to the east along Chase Road and entering Tamworth at the northeastern corner of town.

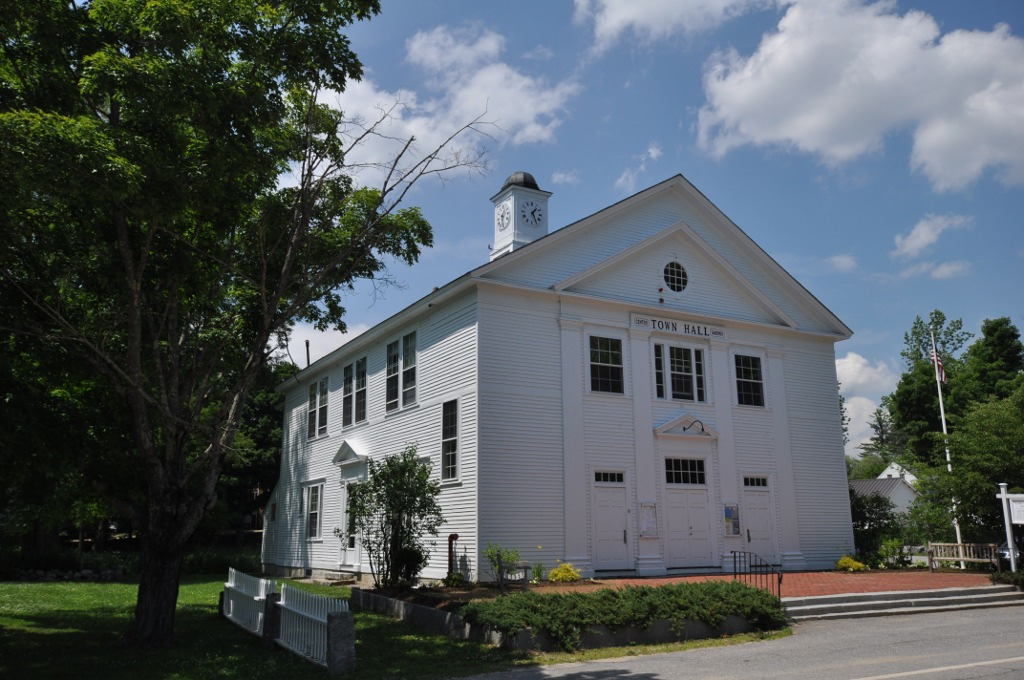
Sandwich Town Hall

== Sites of interest ==
- Advice To The Players (A local Shakespeare company)
- John Davidson's Club Sandwich
- Sandwich Historical Society Museum
- Sandwich Fair
- Squam Lake, site of some location filming for the 1981 feature film On Golden Pond

== Notable people ==
- Isaac Adams (1802–1883), inventor, Massachusetts politician
- Dixi Crosby (1800–1873), surgeon, educator, born in the town
- Claude Rains (1889–1967), portrayed Captain Renault in the film Casablanca
- "Long John" Wentworth (1815–1888), former mayor of Chicago
- Norbert Wiener (1894–1964), the founder of cybernetics, summered at his cottage in Sandwich

== Historic photos ==
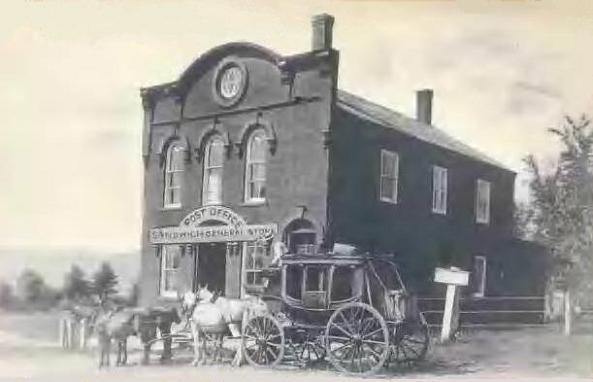
General store and post office c. 1910

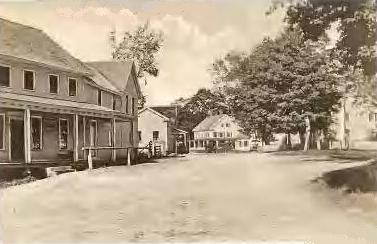
Upper Square in 1911

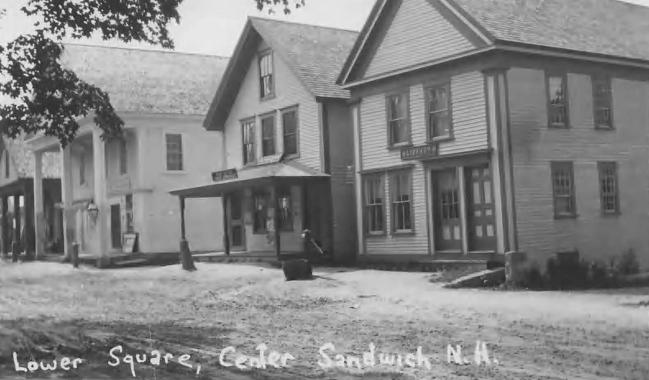
Lower Square c. 1910

== See also ==
- Sandwich, Illinois, named after Sandwich, New Hampshire
