= Christian Fenger =

Danish-born surgeon, pathologist, and medical instructor

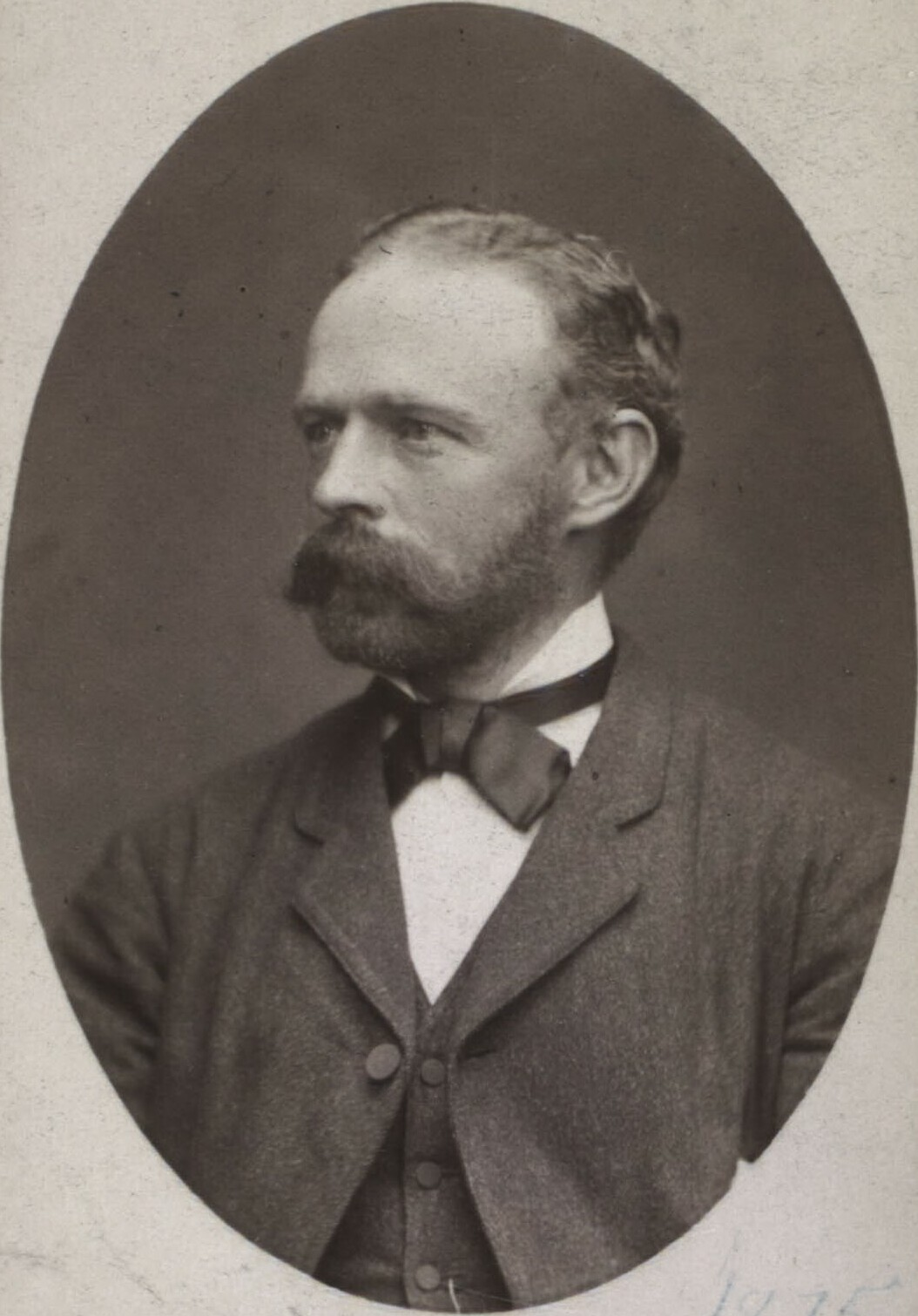
- Born: November 3, 1840; Copenhagen, Denmark
- Died: March 7, 1902 (aged 61); Chicago, Illinois, United States
- Resting place: Graceland Cemetery
- Education: Copenhagen Polytechnic Institute; University of Copenhagen
- Known for: Surgery

Signature
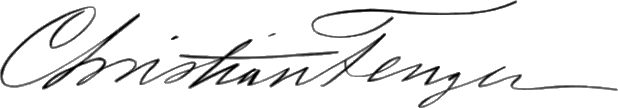

Christian Fenger (November 3, 1840 – March 7, 1902) was a Danish-born surgeon, pathologist, and medical instructor. In the later half of his life, he worked at several medical institutions in Chicago, and became one of the most highly regarded surgeons in the United States.

== Early life and education ==
Fenger was born in Ringkøbing, the son of farmer Hans Frederik Fenger (1816–1901) and Frederikke Mathilde Fjelstrup (Fjeldstrup) (1816–1894). His brother was minister at Holmen Church and royal confessioner Hans Mathias Fenger. Their father owned Augustenborg Manor from 1861 to 1870. His paternal grandparents were businessman Peter Fenger and Else Fenger. Fenger studied engineering at the Copenhagen Polytechnic Institute for around a year before his father convinced him to pursue a medical degree at the University of Copenhagen. He gained experience as a surgeon during the Danish-Prussian War and Franco-Prussian War and received his MD in 1874.

== Career ==
From 1875 to 1877, Fenger worked in Egypt, where he studied trachoma and schistosomiasis. However, he did not cope well with the Egyptian climate, and at the advice of a group of Americans he met in Cairo, he set off for the United States. He eventually settled in Chicago, which had a prominent Scandinavian community.

Fenger was invited to perform some autopsies at Cook County Hospital, and soon joined that hospital's surgical staff with a distinguished record conducting experimental skin grafts. He worked there until 1893, while also holding various teaching positions at the Chicago Medical College and the College of Physicians and Surgeons of Chicago. From 1893 to 1899, Fenger worked as chair of surgery at the Chicago Medical College; he then became a professor of surgery at Rush Medical College. Fenger's lectures were very popular, and over the years, he trained several prominent physicians, including William James Mayo, Charles Horace Mayo, Nicholas Senn, James B. Herrick, Ludvig Hektoen, and Howard Taylor Ricketts.

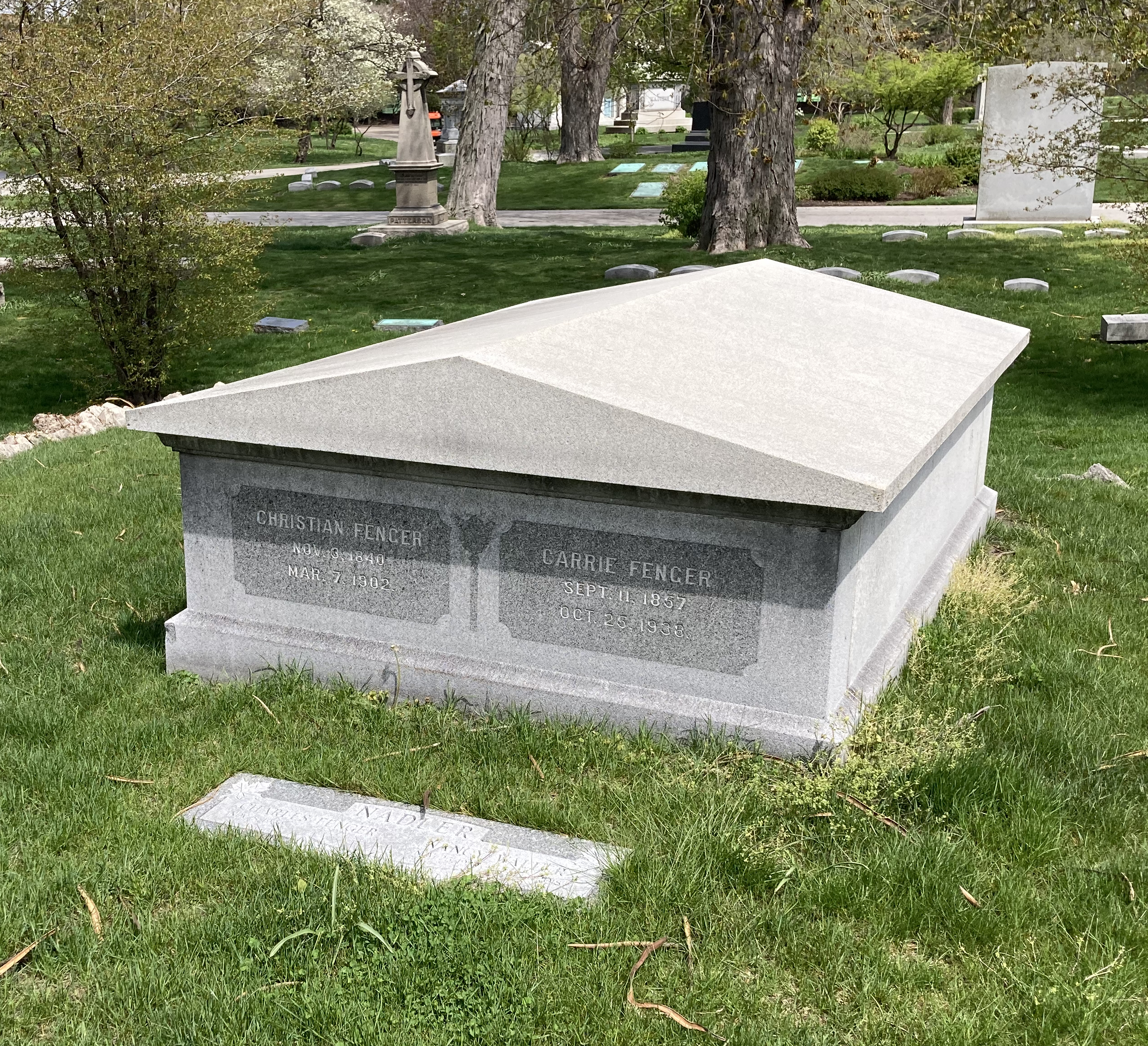
Fenger's grave at Graceland Cemetery

In Chicago, Fenger helped demonstrate the bacterial origins of endocarditis and developed techniques for cleft palate repair, vaginal hysterectomy, and the relief of ureteral strictures. He also became one of the first surgeons to remove an intramedullary tumor from the spinal cord. He performed thousands of autopsies, and used his knowledge of about twelve languages to keep abreast of medical literature. A writer in the Journal of the American Medical Association declared, "There is nothing that he has written, at least nothing with which we are familiar, that does not contain something of value, valuable at least for the time at which it was produced."

== Awards and honors ==
In 1901, Fenger was named to the Order of the Dannebrog by the king of Denmark. He died of pneumonia at his home in Chicago on March 7, 1902. He was buried at Graceland Cemetery. Christian Fenger Academy High School in Chicago is named in his honor.
