= Frederick B. Moorehead =

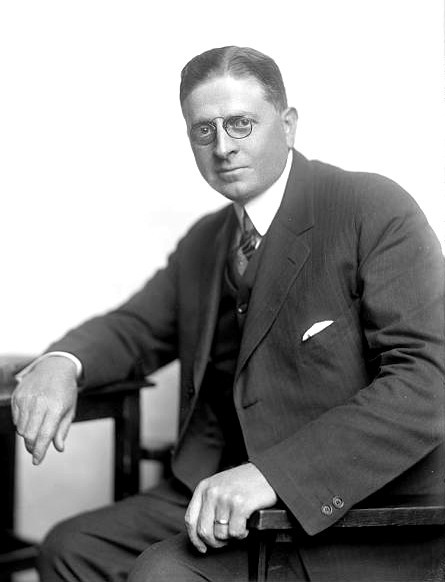
Frederick Brown Moorehead

Frederick Brown Moorehead (October 14, 1875 – August 29, 1944) was an oral surgeon, and led a campaign for what is now the University of Illinois at Chicago College of Dentistry to become part of the University of Illinois.

== Biography ==
Frederick Moorehead was born in 1875 in Mineral Point, Wisconsin, son of James Walter Moorehead and Mary Jane Brown. He graduated from Chicago College of Dental Surgery in 1899 and from Rush Medical College in 1905.

During his administration as dean (1913–1924), the college pioneered the use of electrically driven equipment, and entrance requirements were toughened to allow more time for advanced science training instead of teaching basic skills.

As professor and head of the Department of Oral and Plastic Surgery from 1913-1944, Moorehead was senior author of the textbook Pathology of the Mouth and many research articles, and made advances in reconstructive surgery. In the summer of 1921, Moorehead, along with Henry Sage Dunning of New York and Truman W. Brophy, met in Chicago to organize the 1st association in North America of specialists in what would come to be known as plastic surgery. He also found time to serve on the staff of four other medical facilities, and maintain a private practice.

Moorehead died at Presbyterian Hospital in Chicago on August 29, 1944.

Preceded by George Washington Cook	Deans of the University of Illinois at Chicago College of Dentistry; 1913-1924	Succeeded by Frederick Bogue Noyes
