= List of Nu Sigma Nu chapters =

Nu Sigma Nu Medical Fraternity was a North American co-ed professional fraternity for medical students and related sciences. The national entity ceased operations in 1973, with a few chapters remaining active as a local fraternity. In the following list, active chapters are indicated in bold and inactive chapters are in italics.

Chapter	Charter date and range	Institution	Location	Status	Ref.
Alpha	March 2, 1882 – 2008	University of Michigan	Ann Arbor, Michigan	Inactive	
Beta	May 17, 1889	Detroit College of Medicine	Detroit, Michigan	Inactive	
Gamma	March 26, 1890 – June 12, 1893	Medico-Chirurgical College of Philadelphia	Philadelphia, Pennsylvania	Inactive	(Note: From the 1903 history: "The Gamma chapter of ΝΣΝ was granted without investigation into the character of the work done, while the fraternity was in its infancy. None of the men were experienced in fraternity work and no new men were initiated. But [~only] one of the nine charter members maintain[ed] his standing in the general fraternity, and he affiliate[ed] with Rho chapter. No further report of Gamma and its men [would] appear [in subsequent histories]." The 1932 history indicated that at the seventh National Convention that Gamma's charter was withdrawn and all expelled except one.)
Delta	February 2, 1891	Western University of Pennsylvania	Pittsburgh, Pennsylvania	Inactive	
**Epsilon**	February 21, 1891	University of Minnesota	Minneapolis, Minnesota	Active	
Zeta	March 28, 1891	Chicago Medical College	Evanston, Illinois	Inactive	
Eta	February 2, 1892	University of Illinois College of Medicine	Champaign-Urbana, Illinois	Inactive	
Theta	March 12, 1892	University of Cincinnati Health	Cincinnati, Ohio	Inactive	
Iota	February 4, 1893 – June 10, 1899, 1904–before 1963	Columbia University College of Physicians and Surgeons	New York City, New York	Inactive	(Note: Chapter was suspended in 1899 for sub-par academics.)
Kappa	March 11, 1893	Rush Medical College	Chicago, Illinois	Inactive	
**Lambda**	March 14, 1896	Perelman School of Medicine	Philadelphia, Pennsylvania	Active	
Mu	April 14, 1896–1953	Syracuse University	Syracuse, New York	Inactive	(Note: Chapter formed from The Alpha Society, established in 1894.)
Nu	June 1, 1896 – 1909, 1934	University of Southern California	Los Angeles, California	Inactive	
Xi	February 13, 1897	New York University School of Medicine	New York City, New York	Inactive	
Omicron	December 18, 1899	Union University	Albany, New York	Inactive	
Pi	February 25, 1900	Washington University in St. Louis	St. Louis, Missouri	Inactive	(Note: Chapter formed from Alpha Kappa Phi (local) and continued to use that name.)
**Rho**	February 15, 1900	Jefferson Medical College	Philadelphia, Pennsylvania	Active	
Sigma	April 4, 1900	Western Reserve University	Cleveland, Ohio	Inactive	
Tau	June 11, 1900	Cornell University	Ithaca, New York	Inactive	
Upsilon	September 7, 1900	Cooper Medical College	Palo Alto, California	Inactive	(Note: Chapter formed from Pi Sigma Tau (local), established in 1893.)
Phi	September 7, 1900	University of California	Berkeley, California	Inactive	
Chi	February 15, 1902	University of Toronto	Toronto, Ontario, Canada	Inactive	
Psi	February 20, 1904 – before 1963	University of Virginia	Charlottesville, Virginia	Inactive	(Note: Chapter formed from Pi Mu (local) and continued to use this name.)
Omega	1900			Memorial	
Beta Alpha	October 10, 1904	University of Maryland School of Medicine	Baltimore, Maryland	Inactive	
Beta Beta	March 18, 1905	Johns Hopkins University	Baltimore, Maryland	Inactive	
Beta Gamma	December 8, 1905	University at Buffalo	Buffalo, New York	Inactive	(Note: Chapter formed from I.C.I. (local) and continued to use that name.)
Beta Delta	December 18, 1906	Roy J. and Lucille A. Carver College of Medicine	Iowa City, Iowa	Inactive	
Beta Epsilon	December 21, 1906	University of Nebraska Omaha	Omaha, Nebraska	Inactive	
Beta Zeta	January 19, 1907	Yale University	New Haven, Connecticut	Inactive	(Note: Chapter formed from Delta Epsilon Iota (local) and continued to use that name.)
Beta Eta	May 18, 1908	Indiana University School of Medicine	Bloomington, Indiana	Inactive	(Note: Charter transferred Jan 1, 1913, from Bloomington to Indianapolis)
Beta Theta	February 6, 1909 – before 1963	University of Kansas School of Medicine	Lawrence, Kansas	Inactive	
Beta Iota	February 4, 1910	Tulane University School of Medicine	New Orleans, Louisiana	Inactive	
Beta Kappa	March 15, 1913	Harvard Medical School	Boston, Massachusetts	Inactive	
Beta Lambda	December 20, 1915	University of Texas	Galveston, Texas	Inactive	
Beta Mu	November 12, 1918	McGill University	Montreal, Quebec, Canada	Inactive	
Beta Nu	May 12, 1919	University of Oregon Medical School	Portland, Oregon	Inactive	
Beta Xi	February 26, 1924 – c. 1973	University of Colorado School of Medicine	Denver, Colorado	Inactive	
Beta Omicron	January 2, 1926	University of Wisconsin School of Medicine	Madison, Wisconsin	Inactive	
Beta Pi	October 29, 1927 – before 1963	University of Vermont	Burlington, Vermont	Inactive	(Note: Chapter formed from Delta Mu (local) and continued to use that name.)
Beta Rho	November 21, 1931 – before 1963	Duke University	Durham, North Carolina	Inactive	(Note: "A half century of Nu Sigma Nu" indicates March 7, 1931 for the date it was instituted rather than November 21, 1931 from the duke image)
Beta Sigma	May 25, 1934 – December 1, 1934	Queen's School of Medicine	Kingston, Ontario, Canada	Inactive	(Note: Chapter formed from Psi Delta Phi (local).)
Beta Tau	March 2, 1935	Ohio State University	Columbus, Ohio	Inactive	(Note: Chapter came from chapter of Alpha Mu Pi Omega who supported a proposed merger with Nu Sigma Nu)
Beta Upsilon	February 8, 1941	George Washington University	Washington, D.C.	Inactive	
Beta Phi	January 20, 1947	University of Alabama	Birmingham, Alabama	Inactive	
Beta Chi	February 4, 1950	University of Washington	Seattle, Washington	Inactive	
Beta Psi	May 19, 1951	LSU Health Sciences Center New Orleans	New Orleans, Louisiana	Inactive	
Gamma Alpha	1953	University of California Los Angeles	Los Angeles, California	Inactive	
Gamma Beta	October 23, 1960	University of Mississippi School of Medicine	Oxford, Mississippi	Inactive	
