= Bertram Welton Sippy =

American gastroenterologist (1866–1924)

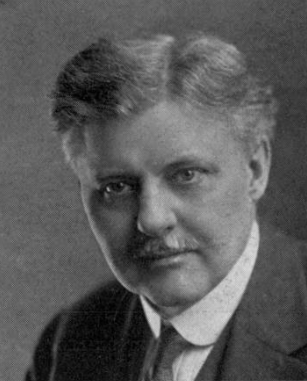
- Born: October 30, 1866; Neptune, Richland County, Wisconsin, US
- Died: August 15, 1924 (aged 57); Eden Township, Mason County, Michigan, US
- Education: Rush Medical College
- Occupation: Physician
- Years active: 1890–1924
- Known for: Sippy regimen
- Relatives: Mabel Zarifa Lamberson, wife Jay George Lamberson, father-in-law
- Medical career
- Field: Gastroenterology
- Institutions: Chicago Presbyterian Hospital, American Medical Association, Association of American Physicians, American Gastroenterological Association, Chicago Neurological Society, Chicago Pathological Society
- Sub-specialties: Internal medicine

Bertram Welton Sippy (October 30, 1866 – August 15, 1924) was an American gastroenterologist, notable for developing the Sippy regimen for the treatment of peptic ulcer disease.

== Biography ==
Bertram Welton Sippy was born on October 30, 1866, in Neptune, Wisconsin, the son of Thomas Sippy and Laura Welton; one of four children born to them. His father was a native of Hinckley, Ohio, and his mother a native of Akron, Indiana. He went to Rush Medical College to study medicine, graduating in 1890. He interned at Cook County Hospital until 1892; in 1895-1896, he studied abroad at the University of Vienna, and in 1902 studied at the University of Berlin. He practiced as an attending physician at Cook County Hospital from 1900 until 1912, and at Presbyterian Hospital from 1906 until his death. He also taught as a professor of medicine at Rush Medical College and the University of Chicago, from 1906 onwards.

In addition to his medical responsibilities, he was also a member of the University Club of Chicago social club and Nu Sigma Nu fraternity.

He was most notable for his pioneering treatment for peptic ulcer disease; linking the acidity of the stomach to the severity of the ulcers, he prescribed hourly servings of milk and cream supplemented by other forms of antacids. This treatment revolutionized the healing of the ulcers, but was ultimately superseded due to its inability to prevent their recurrence.

On June 25, 1895, in Madison, Wisconsin, he married Mabel Zarifa Lamberson, daughter of Wisconsin assemblyman Jay George Lamberson and his wife Jane Elizabeth Ward.

He died on Friday, August 15, 1924 at his summer estate on Woodruff Lake, in Eden Township, Mason County, Michigan.

== Bibliography ==
- Gastric and duodenal ulcer. Medical cure by an efficient removal of gastric juice corrosion.
- Diagnosis of esophageal lesions.
