= Ernest E. Irons =

American physician (1877–1959)

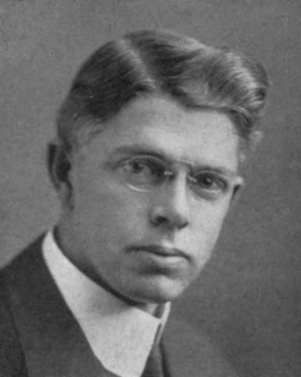

President of the American Medical Association
- In office 1949–1950

President of the American College of Physicians
- In office 1944–1946

Personal details
- Born: February 17, 1877 Council Bluffs, Iowa
- Died: January 18, 1959 (aged 81) Chicago, Illinois
- Education: University of Chicago; Rush Medical College
- Occupation: Physician

Ernest Edward Irons (February 17, 1877 – January 18, 1959) was an American physician who led several prominent medical organizations. Working as an intern under physician James B. Herrick, he identified abnormalities on a blood smear that resulted in the first published report of sickle cell disease.

Irons was later dean of Rush Medical College, and he was president of the American Medical Association (AMA), the American College of Physicians and the American Association for the Study and Control of Rheumatic Diseases. Late in his life, he spent several years as the board president for the Chicago Municipal Tuberculosis Sanitarium.

== Early life ==
Irons was born on a farm in the area of Council Bluffs, Iowa, to Edward Irons and Mary J. Sharp Irons. In 1894, a young Irons was the founding president of the Iowa Ornithologists' Association. He remained involved with the group when he went to college at the University of Chicago. He earned a medical degree from Rush Medical College in 1903.

== Career ==
=== Description of sickle cell disease ===
As a 27-year-old medical intern, Irons was working at Presbyterian Hospital in Chicago with James B. Herrick, who ran a hematology clinic. Irons evaluated Walter Clement Noel, who had immigrated to Chicago from Grenada to enter dental school. Noel was experiencing weakness, shortness of breath and a painful sore on his ankle. Because of the Noel's country of origin and his symptoms, Irons and Herrick thought that the man had malaria. Irons took a blood sample from the patient and examined it under a microscope, expecting to confirm the malaria diagnosis. Instead, Irons noted elongated, sickle-shaped red blood cells on the slide.

Irons alerted Herrick, and they attempted to come up with a differential diagnosis for the man's symptoms and blood results. The pair followed Noel for more than two years but ultimately lost track of him without establishing a diagnosis. After publishing reports of the man's illness in 1910, Herrick was credited with the first report of sickle cell disease. After Noel completed dental school in Chicago, he returned to Grenada to open a dental clinic. He died of pneumonia a few years later.

=== Postgraduate training and medical practice ===
Irons pursued postgraduate studies in Vienna in 1909 and 1910. He studied bacteriology at the University of Chicago until 1912, graduating with a Ph.D. By the mid-1910s, Irons was on the executive committee of the Chicago Society of Internal Medicine.

During World War I, he was a lieutenant colonel in the U.S. Army Medical Corps and was placed in charge of the hospital at Camp Custer. At a conference of the American Hospital Association in 1919, Irons presented a paper on the elimination of waste in hospital food service operations. In the same year, Irons explained to The Literary Digest that Army hospitals were teaching technical skills to wounded soldiers. Irons said that even after wounds healed, a soldier remained stiff and that learning technical skills helped to rebuild his strength during the recovery process.

He was dean of Rush Medical College from 1923 to 1936. Irons was named president of the board of directors of the Chicago Municipal Tuberculosis Sanitarium (MTS) in 1948. The Chicago Tribune credited Irons with greatly improving the services, outcomes and morale at the MTS, noting that the mortality rate fell and that the center's waiting list was able to be eliminated.

=== Service to national organizations ===
In the early 1920s, Irons was chairman of the Nu Sigma Nu national physician fraternity. He also served as president of the Institute of Medicine of Chicago. In 1934–1935, he was the founding president of the American Association for the Study and Control of Rheumatic Diseases, which was later known as the American Rheumatism Association and the American College of Rheumatology. Irons was the president of the American College of Physicians from 1944 to 1946.

He was the 1949–1950 president of the AMA. Irons and the AMA strongly opposed President Truman's proposal for a national health plan, referring to it as socialized medicine and drawing parallels to Communism. Even at his inaugural address as AMA president, Irons focused on the topic. "Nationalized medicine will be followed by nationalized industry. Industrialists see the threat to free enterprise and progress," he said. He later voiced his opposition to federal funding of both higher education and healthcare, saying, "Every subsidy carries with it the threat of regulation, despite any disclaimer of previous intent." While Irons was president, the AMA spent $1 million to fight Truman's health plan proposal.

== Personal ==
Irons was married to the former Gertrude Thompson from Ontario. They had two children, physician Edwin N. Irons and attorney Spencer E. Irons.

== Later life ==
In the 1950s, Irons published a book, The Story of Rush Medical College, and he started work on a history of Presbyterian-St. Luke's Hospital. In November 1958, Irons was assaulted and robbed outside of his home in Chicago. The robbers stole a dollar in change from him. Still recovering from spinal injuries sustained in the attack, Irons suffered a heart attack and died at Presbyterian Hospital in Chicago on January 18, 1959.
