= Julian Herman Lewis =

American pathologist (1891–1989)

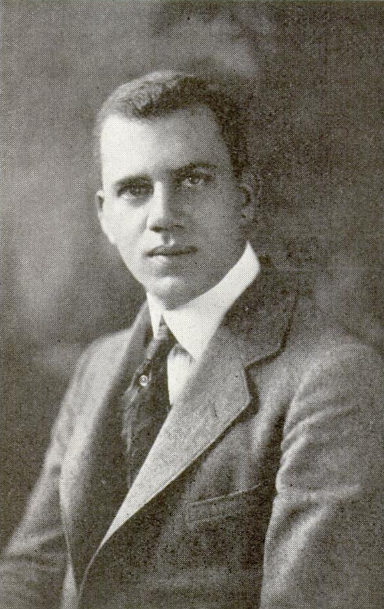
- Lewis circa 1922
- Born: May 26, 1891
- Died: March 6, 1989 (aged 97)
- Education: BA, University of Illinois Urbana-Champaign, 1911; MA, University of Illinois Urbana-Champaign, 1912; PhD, University of Chicago, 1915; MD, Rush Medical College, 1917
- Occupation: Pathologist
- Known for: The Biology of the Negro (1942)
- Medical career
- Awards: Ricketts Prize (1915); Benjamin Rush Medal (1917); Guggenheim Fellowship (1926)

Julian Herman Lewis (May 26, 1891 – March 6, 1989) was an American pathologist. The son of a freed slave, Lewis became the first African-American associate professor at the University of Chicago in 1922. His research interests included racial differences in relation to medicine and immunology. He earned a Guggenheim Fellowship for research in immunology in 1926.

Lewis's research on race culminated in the 1942 publication of The Biology of the Negro, a lengthy text summarizing the scientific literature on the demographic, anatomical, physiological and biochemical characteristics of the black population. While Lewis was deeply interested in biological differences between the races, he argued against the viewpoint that black people were biologically inferior. The book, though well reviewed, sold poorly, and Lewis published no further works after 1943.

== Early life and education ==
Lewis was born on May 26, 1891, in Shawneetown, Illinois, to John Calhoun Lewis, a freed slave, and Cordelia O. Scott Lewis. Both of Lewis's parents were schoolteachers. Lewis attended the University of Illinois Urbana-Champaign for his undergraduate education, graduating in 1911 with a degree in biology and physiology. He received a master's degree from the University of Illinois Urbana-Champaign in 1912 and then attended the University of Chicago, where he completed his PhD in 1915. Lewis won the Ricketts Prize for his PhD dissertation on lipids and immunity. He graduated from Rush Medical College with an MD in 1917, earning the Benjamin Rush Medal for academic achievement. Lewis married Eva Overton in 1918; the couple had three children.

== Career ==
=== Early career ===
After his graduation from Rush, Lewis was appointed to the University of Chicago's department of pathology. In 1920 he was hired as a pathologist at the African-American Provident Hospital, where he eventually became chief pathologist. During his early years at Chicago, Lewis worked closely with H. Gideon Wells and Ludvig Hektoen. Wells served as a mentor and advocate throughout Lewis's career, and Hektoen's research on blood groups informed Lewis's studies of medicine and race.

Hektoen had previously published statistics on ABO blood types, but had not noted the race of his subjects, who were all white. In 1922, Lewis published a paper on the frequency of ABO blood types in African-Americans in the Journal of the American Medical Association. Lewis noted that the distribution of blood types differed between white and black people and that it was inaccurate to define what was "normal" based only on white subjects. This would become a major theme of his research.

In the same year that Lewis's paper was published, he became an associate professor of pathology at Chicago. The first African-American to hold such a position at the university, Lewis served in this role until 1943. The Sprague Institute awarded him a grant in 1922 to research "pathology among Negroes in all countries", and in 1926, he earned a Guggenheim Fellowship for immunology studies at the University of Basel.

=== The Biology of the Negro ===
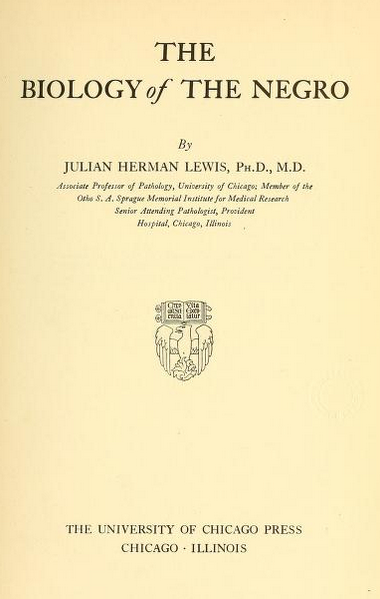
Front page of The Biology of the Negro, 1942

In 1942, Lewis published the culmination of the work he had begun 20 years ago: a 400-page volume titled The Biology of the Negro, drawing on medical and anthropological studies from more than 1,300 different researchers. The book—"nothing more than an arranged assembly of the observed and reported facts concerning the biology, including the pathology, of the Negro", as Lewis described it—provided an extensive overview of the literature on racial differences, spending, for example, 35 pages on a discussion of black skin. It was divided into nine chapters, the first three of which covered demographic factors, anatomy, and physiology and biochemistry. The remaining six focused on racial differences in the presentation of various classes of diseases. Special attention was given to sickle cell anemia, which Lewis argued was a disease exclusive to the black population.

While Lewis stated that "many of the biological and environmental characteristics of the two peoples...show sharp contrasts", he criticized the use of biological differences to justify belief in the inferiority of blacks to whites. He argued that many physiological differences were advantageous, noting the comparative resistance of blacks to malaria and how it facilitated the building of the Panama Canal by West Indian laborers, and dismissed research on racial differences in mental illness as "in keeping with the conventional vaudeville stage conception of the Negro". A 1942 review in the Journal of the National Medical Association stated " [i]t is noteworthy that the author failed to discover any fundamental evidence to show that the Negro is biologically inferior to other groups".

Some, however, considered Lewis's focus on the biological aspects of race to be regressive. A review by William Montague Cobb in The Crisis, the official magazine of the NAACP, praised the book as "a significant contribution to the long recognized need for a scientific reference volume on constitutional studies of the Negro", but noted that it did little to challenge the contemporary medical literature and in its discussion of sickle cell anemia "approache[d] dangerously the reductio ad absurdum which even the Negro himself denounces in respect to so-called tests of Negro blood". Lewis's position on sickle cell disease was later characterized by Keith Wailoo as "an endorsement and legitimation of cherished racial categories through blood analysis".

The book, although it received mostly positive reviews, sold less than 500 copies in 1942 and was not reprinted. Lewis's biological approach to the study of race gradually fell out of favor in the academic community.

=== Later career ===
H. Gideon Wells died in 1943. Lewis's academic work suffered: after that year he never published a research paper again, and he was put on leave from the university in 1944. The next year, he asked the Sprague Institute to fund the establishment of a laboratory dedicated to the study of racial differences at the Provident Hospital. The Institute agreed to finance the project, but the plans never materialized; the death of Lewis's wife that year may have played a role. During the later years of his career, Lewis took up various positions at local hospitals, eventually leaving Provident in 1952. He served as the director of pathology at Our Lady of Mercy Hospital in Dyer, Indiana until just before his death. Lewis died on March 6, 1989.

== Selected publications ==
- Lewis, Julian Herman (1915). "Inhibitory Action of Heterologous Protein Mixtures on Anaphylaxis". The Journal of Infectious Diseases. 17 (1): 241–258. doi:10.1093/infdis/17.1.241. JSTOR 30083500.
- Lewis, Julian H. (1922). "The Racial Distribution of Isohemagglutinin Groups". The Journal of the American Medical Association. 79 (17): 1422. doi:10.1001/jama.1922.02640170048014. ISSN 0098-7484.
- The Biology of the Negro. Chicago, Illinois: University of Chicago Press. 1942. OCLC 910873.
