= Nu Sigma Nu =

International fraternity

- ΝΣΝ
- Founded: 2 March 1882; 144 years ago University of Michigan
- Type: Professional
- Former affiliation: PIC
- Status: Active
- Emphasis: Medicine
- Scope: North America
- Member badge
- Colors: Garnet, White, and Yellow gold
- Flower: Red and white carnations
- Chapters: 2 active, 48 chartered
- Members: 30,000+ lifetime
- Headquarters: Ann Arbor, Michigan; United States

Nu Sigma Nu (ΝΣΝ) was a North American professional fraternity for medicine, now existing as a handful of chapters. It was founded in 1882 by five medical students at the University of Michigan. As one of the earliest formed among all professional fraternities, Nu Sigma Nu was the first fraternal organization nationally to limit membership to medical students only. It can therefore claim that it was the first Medical Professional Fraternity. It was a member of the Professional Fraternity Association.

== History ==
Nu Sigma Nu was founded on March 2, 1882, by medical students from the class of 1883 at the University of Michigan in Ann Arbor, Michigan. Their goal was "to further the best interests of our profession." Later, its purpose was more fully stated as, "To promote scholarship, the development of better teaching, and generally in raising medical education to a higher level." Its founding members were Frederick Clark Bailey, Charles Marshall Frye, John Lincoln Gish, William James Mayo, Robert D. Stephens, and Benjamin Grinnell Strong.

The founders developed and signed the constitution and signed the original charter upon their initiation. Soon afterward, two professors were added to the membership rolls: Donald McLean and George E. Frothingham. With these, and a fixed attention on professional achievement in its defined area of study, the fraternity had a relatively short period before contemplating a national expansion. The Grand Chapter of Nu Sigma Nu was formed in 1886. Its Beta chapter was formed in 1889 at the Detroit College of Medicine, and the fraternity added additional chapters during a vigorous period of growth from 1890 to 1933.

Nu Sigma Nu was the first of five national medical professional fraternities to form, and did so when the concept of a professional fraternity was far less common; it was a pioneer in the establishment of the professional model. It was the first fraternal organization nationally to limit membership to medical students only. It can therefore claim that it was the first Medical Professional Fraternity.

Chapters that aggressively maintained their ties with alumni and faculty for the benefit of student members, and who eyed long-term viability, with alumni support, encouraged early growth of their building and scholarship funds. As early as 1901, the Alpha chapter had accumulated enough capital to seek real estate investment, and it purchased a suitable lot in Ann Arbor on Huron Street, near the medical school at that time. By the writing of the 1903 history, there were already 2,093 members.

Historical records show Epsilon chapter at the University of Minnesota similarly sought to build early in its history, choosing a site at 429 Union Street, in Minneapolis, just two blocks from the medical school. Prior to this, Epsilon chapter rented space at the Masonic Temple at 6th and Hennepin in Minneapolis.

By 1954 Nu Sigma Nu had initiated over 30,000 members on 45 campuses. The fraternity became co-educational in 1972. The national fraternity was dissolved in 1973, due to changing student interest and organizational turmoil. However, several well-established chapters survived and have flourished as semi-local institutions. The remaining chapters occasionally communicate, but there is no continuation of national convention activity.

== Symbols and traditions ==
Nu Sigma Nu's badge was a stacked monogram of its Greek letters, crown-set with rubies and pearls. Its crest was sometimes, but not always, versioned by chapter; Alpha chapter used an "Α" in the center, Epsilon chapter uses an "Ε" in the center, etc. Its flowers were the red and white carnations. Its colors were garnet, white and yellow gold.

Its 'fraternity yell' as adopted in 1903 was "Nu Sig Nu Sig Nu Sig Nu, Nu Sig Nu Sig Nu Sig Nu." Several songs are recorded in the 1903 history, pairing them with then-popular tunes to which the new words were written to fit. One of them, to the tune of "Auld Lang Syne", is called "ENYS GNAL DLUA" with the following lyrics:

Should auld acquaintance die away,
And friends be passers-by,
Nu Sigma Nu will ever stay
To be our lasting tie.
Nu Sigma Nu where'er she's found,
Holds friendships strong and true;
So, brothers, join all hands around
And sing Nu Sigma Nu.
As years go on we'll all know well
Old age has come at last
Nu Sigma Nu will ever tell
Fond memories of the past.
Our watchword shall forever be:
What'er we think or do,
from now until eternity,
our frat, Nu Sigma Nu.

== Membership ==
Membership requirements for Nu Sigma Nu varied by chapter. The Michigan chapter offered its facilities to house medical students and those in related fields. Other chapters appear to limit membership to only medical students.

== Activities and scholarships ==
Several catalogs and histories were published by the Fraternity in its early years, including Nu Sigma Nu in 1903, and similarly titled versions in 1900, and other years. Some chapters had been diligent in publishing chapter bulletins which included historical summaries, lists and commentary of national interest.

The Alpha chapter previously offered scholarships to support an international residency to one student per year, paid for by a fund developed by the alumni of the chapter. Apparently, some of the dormant chapters maintained investment and/or scholarship funds. In 2011, the successors of the chapter at the University of Colorado announced their intent to contribute $650,000 for a "green roof" atop the Anschutz Health and Wellness Center at the new Anschutz Medical Campus at the University of Colorado. The chapter had expired in approximately 1973, about the time the national was dissolved, though afterward its alumni bought three houses which they leased to students for over a decade after the chapter's closure.

== Chapters ==
The society had established 37 chapters by 1930, and 48 by circa 1963. Of that chapter roster, three remain active, the University of Pennsylvania, University of Minnesota, and Thomas Jefferson University.

== Notable members ==
- Eugene W. Caldwell, engineer, radiographer and physician
- William T. Fitzsimons (Beta Theta), physician and United States Army officer considered the first American officer killed in World War I
- Ernest E. Irons, dean of Rush Medical College and president of the American Medical Association and the American College of Physicians
- William J. Mayo (Alpha) one of the co-founders of the Mayo Clinic
- Jeffrey R. MacDonald, military physician convicted of murder
- C. A. Robins, Governor of Idaho and Idaho Senate
- Fred Schacht, college football coach, All-American player, and medical doctor
- Herbert Scheetz, college football coach
- Bertram Welton Sippy, gastroenterologist
- Kendall Smith, professor emeritus of medicine at Weill Cornell Medicine
- William E. Upjohn, founder of the Upjohn Pharmaceutical Company
- Clarence Hungerford Webb, medical doctor and archaeologist

== See also ==
- Professional fraternities and sororities
