= Ruth Darrow =

American pathologist

- Darrow with a patient, c. 1945
- Born: 1895
- Died: 1956 (aged 60–61); Chicago, Illinois, United States
- Education: Western Reserve University; Rush Medical College
- Occupation: Pathologist
- Known for: Identifying the cause of hemolytic disease of the newborn
- Spouse: Chester Darrow

Ruth Renter Darrow (1895–1956) was an American pathologist who was the first to identify the cause of hemolytic disease of the newborn (HDN). In 1938, three years prior to the discovery of antibodies against the Rh antigen, Darrow correctly hypothesized that the disease was caused by destruction of red blood cells due to antibodies in the mother's blood. Darrow's research was inspired by her personal experiences with the disease.

== Biography ==
Darrow was born in 1895. She did her undergraduate studies at Western Reserve University and graduated from Rush Medical College in Chicago, Illinois, in 1930. Five years later she had her third child, a son, with her husband Dr. Chester Darrow. Her son suffered from erythroblastosis fetalis (now known as hemolytic disease of the newborn) and died shortly after birth. Darrow began to research HDN with a dedication that her colleagues described as consuming her; she later stated that after her son's death, "the study of this disease has been my chief avocation". At the time, the disease was believed to be caused by a metabolic defect of red blood cells.

The mother is actively immunized against fetal red cells or some component of them. The immunization may conceivably occur as a result of an accident whereby the fetal cells or their hemoglobin gain entrance to the maternal blood sinuses. The antibodies formed in the maternal organism may then pass to the child through the placenta... Such a transfer of immune bodies from an actively immunized mother to the fetus or new-born child sets up in the offspring a state of passive immunity.

— Ruth Renter Darrow, Archives of Pathology (1938)

In 1938, while working as a physician at the Women's and Children's Hospital in Chicago, Darrow published a review of HDN in the Archives of Pathology that drew on her personal experiences in addition to the existing literature. Darrow reasoned that given the disease's effect on red blood cells, its familial occurrence, and the tendency of women's first few pregnancies to be unaffected, the cause of HDN must involve the mother becoming immunized against some element of the fetus's red cells after they enter the mother's circulation. The maternal antibody could then cross into the fetal circulation and cause an antigen-antibody reaction resulting in destruction of red blood cells.

Darrow's hypothesis about the cause of HDN is consistent with the current understanding, although the antibodies involved in HDN had yet to be discovered when Darrow published her paper. However, the paper received little attention at the time, perhaps due to its 40-page length and its publication in a journal of pathology rather than pediatrics.

While her description of the general mechanism of HDN was correct, Darrow believed the causative agent was fetal hemoglobin rather than blood group antibodies. She based this hypothesis on studies by Louis K. Diamond which showed that the parents of babies with HDN usually had compatible ABO blood types; the Rh antigen was poorly understood at the time. Darrow's belief in this hypothesis was strengthened when she had her blood type tested in 1941 and the result was Rh positive. However, this result was erroneous, and a repeat test three years later showed she was Rh negative.

In 1941, Philip Levine and colleagues published a paper that confirmed Darrow's antigen-antibody theory of HDN using serologic testing. Levine's testing conclusively demonstrated the presence of Rh antibodies in HDN. A colleague of Levine's recollected that "bubbling with excitement yet reluctant to overturn established dogma and aware that he was venturing into uncharted seas, Levine was visibly reassured when his attention was called to Ruth Darrow's paper in the Archives of Pathology".

In 1941, Darrow gave birth to a daughter at the Women and Children's Hospital. Her daughter, like her son, suffered from HDN. Darrow, working with her intern Josephine Chapin, devised a treatment plan based on her research. Despite the high mortality rate of HDN at the time, Darrow's daughter made a full recovery.

Darrow died in 1956 in Chicago, Illinois.

== Selected publications ==
- "Icterus gravis (erythroblastosis) neonatorum". Archives of Pathology 25 (1938): 378–417.
- "Pathogenesis of passive Rh isosensitization in the newborn (erythroblastosis fetalis)". Archives of Diseases of Childhood 73 (1947): 257–278 (with Josephine Chapin)
