= Russell Morse Wilder =

American physician

- Born: November 24, 1885; Cincinnati, Ohio
- Died: December 16, 1959 (aged 74); Rochester, Minnesota
- Occupation: Physician

Russell Morse Wilder Sr. (November 24, 1885 – December 16, 1959) was an American physician, diabetologist, epileptologist, and medical researcher, known as one of the originators of the ketogenic ("classic keto") diet as a therapy for both epilepsy and diabetes. He coined the term "ketogenic diet." He was also among the first American physicians to use insulin for patients with diabetes.

== Biography ==
At the University of Chicago he graduated with a B.S. in 1907 and with a Ph.D. in pathology in 1911. At Rush Medical College he was an instructor from 1909 to 1910 in pathology and anatomy and graduated there in 1911 with an M.D. (Rush Medical College was affiliated with the University of Chicago until 1942.) During his undergraduate study he spent a year at Heidelberg University. As a medical student, he went to Mexico City in December 1909 with the physician and medical researcher Howard Taylor Ricketts to study typhus fever in the Valley of Mexico. Ricketts died of the disease on May 5, 1910, but Wilder returned to Mexico to carry on the research. He studied for eight months in 1914 in Vienna, principally at the First Medical Clinic under the pathologist Albert Müller-Deham (1881–1971), who had studied as a medical assistant under Carl von Noorden. Upon his return from Vienna, Wilder became a physician at Chicago's Presbyterian Hospital, where he worked from 1914 to 1917 and completed his medical residency. While he worked at Presbyterian Hospital, he was a fellow at the Sprague Memorial Institute from 1915 to 1917.

At the Mayo Clinic, Wilder was a staff member from 1919 to 1929 and was section head for all the diabetic patients. At the Mayo Foundation he was an assistant professor from 1919 to 1922 and an associate professor from 1922 to 1929. From 1929 to 1931 he was a professor of medicine and chair of the department of medicine at the University of Chicago. In 1931 he rejoined the staff of the Mayo Clinic and became, at the Mayo Foundation, a full professor and head of the department of medicine. At the Mayo Clinic he investigated clinical problems of metabolism and nutrition. In 1950 he retired from the Mayo Clinic and Mayo Foundation to become the first director of the newly formed National Institute of Arthritis and Metabolic Diseases. In 1953, due to health problems, he retired as the institute's director and returned to Rochester, Minnesota.

Wilder was the author or co-author of more than 250 papers and contributed to several medical textbooks and to the Encyclopaedia Britannica. He served "at various times on the editorial board of the Journal of Nutrition and the Archives of Internal Medicine, the editorial committee of Nutrition Reviews and as an associate editor of Public Health Reports." He used his expertise in medicine and nutrition to serve the U.S. Federal government in several committees and agencies, especially during WW II. For a one-year term from 1946 to 1947 he was the president of the American Diabetes Association. In 1950 he delivered the Frank Billings Lecture. In 1954 he received the American Medical Association's Joseph Goldberger Award in Clinical Nutrition. In 1956 he was the president of the National Vitamin Foundation, which in 1954 created the Russell M. Wilder Fellowship. In 1956 he received an award from the American Bakers Association "in recognition of his leadership in promoting enrichment of white flour and bread with vitamins."

On March 18, 1911, in Butler, Ohio, he married Lucy Elizabeth Beeler (1889–1968). Upon his death he was survived by his widow and two sons, Russell Morse Wilder Jr., M.D. (1912–1979) and Thomas Carroll Wilder, M.D. (1915–1961).

== Selected publications ==
=== Articles ===
- Ricketts, H. T.; Wilder, R. M. (1910). "The Typhus Fever of Mexico (Tarbadillo)". Journal of the American Medical Association (6): 463–467. doi:10.1001/jama.1910.92550320009002o.
- Ricketts, H. T.; Wilder, R. M. (1910). "The Transmission of the Typhus Fever of Mexico (Tabardillo) by Means of the Louse (Pediculus Vestamenti)". Journal of the American Medical Association (16): 1304–1307. doi:10.1001/jama.1910.92550420001001h.
- Ricketts, H. T.; Wilder, R. M. (1910). "The Etiology of the Typhus Fever (Tabardillo) of Mexico City". Journal of the American Medical Association (17): 1373–1375. doi:10.1001/jama.1910.92550430001001o.
- Ricketts, H. T.; Wilder, R. M. (1910). "The Relation of Typhus Fever (Tabardillo) to Rocky Mountain Spotted Fever". Archives of Internal Medicine. V (4): 361–370. doi:10.1001/archinte.1910.00050260038003.
- Wilder, Russell M. (1917). "d-Glucose tolerance in health and disease". Archives of Internal Medicine (2): 311–334. doi:10.1001/archinte.1917.00080210152008.
- Russell M. Wilder (1924) [reprinted from Minnesota Medicine, 1923, vi, 524–529]. "How is the overworked general practitioner to use insulin?". In M. H. Mellish (ed.). Collected Papers of the Mayo Clinic and the Mayo Foundation. Vol. XV. W. B. Saunders. pp. 645–655.
- Wilder, Russell M. (1926). "Hyperthyroidism, Myxedema and Diabetes". Archives of Internal Medicine. 38 (6): 736–760. doi:10.1001/archinte.1926.00120300053005.
- Wilder, Russell M.; Allan, Frank N.; Power, M. H.; Robertson, H. E. (1927). "Carcinoma of the Islands of the Pancreas". Journal of the American Medical Association. 89 (5): 348–355. doi:10.1001/jama.1927.02690050014007.
- Woltman, Henry W.; Wilder, R. M. (1929). "Diabetes Mellitus". Archives of Internal Medicine. 44 (4): 576–603. doi:10.1001/archinte.1929.00140040114010.
- Wilder, Russell M. (1929). "Hyperparathyroidism: Tumor of the Parathyroid Glands Associated with Osteitis Fibrosa". Endocrinology. 13 (3): 231–244. doi:10.1210/endo-13-3-231.
- Wagener, Henry P.; Dry, Thomas J. Story; Wilder, Russell M. (1934). "Retinitis in Diabetes". New England Journal of Medicine. 211 (25): 1131–1137. doi:10.1056/NEJM193412202112502.
- Sprague, R.G.; Blum, B.B.; Osterberg, A.E.; Kepler, E.J.; Wilder, R.M. (1936). "Clinical Observations with Insulin Protamine Compound". Journal of the American Medical Association. 106 (20): 1701–1705. doi:10.1001/jama.1936.02770200007003.
- Wilder, R. M.; Kendall, E. C.; Snell, A. M.; Kepler, E. J.; Rynearson, E. H.; Adams, M. (1937). "Intake of Potassium, an Important Consideration in Addison's Disease". Archives of Internal Medicine. 59 (3): 367–393. doi:10.1001/archinte.1937.00170190002001.
- Cutler, Haydn H.; Power, M. H.; Wilder, R. H. (1938). "Concentrations of Chloride, Sodium and Potassium in Urine and Blood". Journal of the American Medical Association. 111 (2): 117–122. doi:10.1001/jama.1938.02790280007002.
- Williams, R. D.; Mason, H. L.; Wilder, R. M.; Smith, B. F. (1940). "Observations on Induced Thiamine (Vitamin B1) Deficiency in Man". Archives of Internal Medicine. 66 (4): 785–799. doi:10.1001/archinte.1940.00190160002001.
- Williams, R. D.; Mason, H. L.; Smith, B. F.; Wilder, R. M. (1942). "Induced Thiamine (Vitamin B1) Deficiency and the Thiamine Requirement of Man". Archives of Internal Medicine. 69 (5): 721–738. doi:10.1001/archinte.1942.00200170003001.
- Williams, R. D.; Mason, H. L.; Power, M. H.; Wilder, R. M. (1943). "Induced Thiamine (Vitamin B1) Deficiency in Man". Archives of Internal Medicine. 71: 38–53. doi:10.1001/archinte.1943.00210010044003.
- Williams, Ray D.; Mason, Harold L.; Cusick, Paul L.; Wilder, Russell M. (1943). "Observations on Induced Riboflavin Deficiency and the Riboflavin Requirement of Man". The Journal of Nutrition. 25 (4): 361–377. doi:10.1093/jn/25.4.361.
- Adamson, J. D.; Jolliffe, N.; Kruse, H. D.; Lowry, O. H.; Moore, P. E.; Platt, B. S.; Sebrell, W. H.; Tice, J. W.; Tisdall, F. F.; Wilder, R. M.; Zamecnik, P. C. (1945). "Medical Survey of Nutrition in Newfoundland". Canadian Medical Association Journal. 52 (3): 227–250. PMC 1582114. PMID 20323369.
- Wilder, Russell M. (1948). "The Unknown Diabetic and How to Recognize Him". Journal of the American Medical Association. 138 (5): 349–51, Disc., 355. doi:10.1001/jama.1948.02900050017005. PMID 18881479.
- Aykroyd, W.R.; Jolliffe, N.; Lowry, O.H.; Moore, P.E.; Sebrell, W.H.; Shank, R.E.; Tisdall, F.F. (1949). "Medical resurvey of nutrition in Newfoundland 1948". Canadian Medical Association Journal. 60 (4): 329–352. PMC 1591368. PMID 18113857.
- Steinberg, A. G.; Wilder, R. M. (1952). "A study of the genetics of diabetes mellitus". American Journal of Human Genetics. 4 (2): 113–135. PMC 1716433. PMID 14943712.

=== Books ===
- Wilder, Russell Morse; Foley, Mary A.; Ellithorpe, Daisy (1921). A Primer for Diabetic Patients: A Brief Outline of the Principles of Diabetic Treatment, Sample Menus, Recipes and Food Tables. W. B. Saunders; 76 pages; 5th edition (1934). 172 pages
