= Margarethe Kunde =

Physician and physiologist (1888–?)

Margarethe Meta H. Kunde
- Born: 15 February 1888; Germany
- Education: University of Nebraska (A.B., B.Sc.); University of Chicago (Ph.D); Rush Medical College (M.D.)
- Scientific career
- Fields: Physiology
- Workplaces: University of Chicago; Northwestern Medical School; Chicago Wesley Hospital

Margarethe Meta Kunde (15 February 1888 – ?) was a German-born, American physician and physiologist.

== Life and work ==
Born in Germany, Margarethe Kunde immigrated to the United States as a small child. She attended the University of Nebraska where she received her A.B. in 1917 and her B.Sc. in 1919. Kunde received her Ph.D in physiology, researching the effects of prolonged fasting on the basal metabolic rate system, from the University of Chicago in 1923 while working there as an assistant and instructor in physiology. While still working at Chicago, she earned her M.D. from Rush Medical College in 1925. She became an assistant professor of medicine in 1930 and then a professor of physiology two years later, resigning in 1936 to concentrate on her private practice.

Kunde started teaching again in 1941, this time as an instructor at the Northwestern Medical School, while working briefly at the Endocrine Clinic of the Chicago Maternity Center (1941) and Cook County Hospital. From 1943 to after 1968, she worked at Chicago Wesley Hospital while researching endocrinology. Her date of death is unknown.
