= Tazelaar =

Tazelaar is a surname. Notable people with the surname include:

- Dirk Tazelaar (born 1963), Australian cricketer
- Henry Tazelaar, American pathologist
- Peter Tazelaar (1920–1993), Dutch World War II veteran
