= Scheetz =

Scheetz is an occupational surname, an Americanized form of German Schütz, which may refer to either an archer or watchman. Notable people with the surname include:

- Herbert Scheetz (1882–1958), American football coach
- Owen Scheetz (1913–1994), American baseball player
- Sami Scheetz (born 1996), American politician
- Terry Scheetz (born 1941), American politician
