= Ludvig Hektoen =

American pathologist (1863–1951)

Ludvig Hektoen MD, NAS
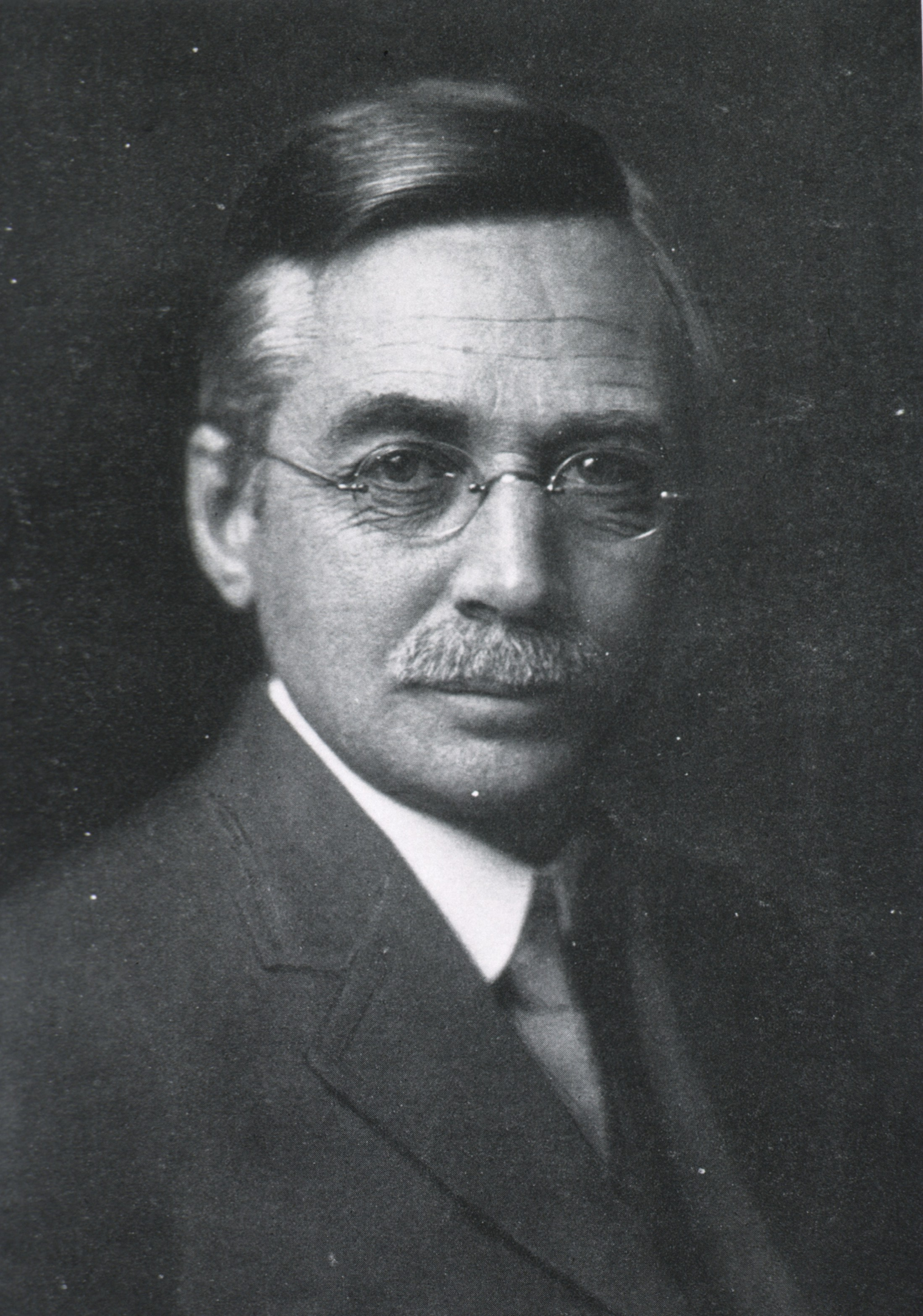
- Born: July 2, 1863; Westby, Wisconsin, United States
- Died: July 5, 1951 (aged 88); Chicago, Illinois, United States
- Education: BA, Luther College, Iowa, 1883 MD, College of Physicians and Surgeons of Chicago, 1887
- Occupation: Pathologist

Ludvig Hektoen (July 2, 1863 – July 5, 1951) was an American pathologist known for his work in the fields of pathology, microbiology and immunology. Hektoen was appointed to the National Academy of Sciences in 1918, and served as president of many professional societies, including the American Association of Immunologists in 1927 and the American Society for Microbiology in 1929. He was the founding editor of the Archives of Pathology and Laboratory Medicine in 1926 and edited several other medical journals. He was knighted to the Order of St. Olav in 1929, and in 1933, he became professor emeritus of pathology at the University of Chicago. The Hektoen Institute for Medical Research—formerly the John McCormick Institute of Infectious Diseases—now bears his name.

== Early life and education ==
Hektoen was born on July 2, 1863, in Westby, Wisconsin, to Peter P. Hektoen, a farmer and Lutheran schoolteacher, and Olave Hektoen (née Thorsgaard), (Note: Also written as Olava.) both Norwegian immigrants. At the age of 14, Hektoen enrolled in Luther College in Iowa, during which time he developed a friendship with Johan K. Schreiner, a Norwegian physician who inspired him to pursue medicine.

After graduating from Luther College with a Bachelor of Arts degree in 1883, Hektoen spent the next year taking pre-medical courses at the University of Wisconsin. He then enrolled in the College of Physicians and Surgeons in Chicago (now the University of Illinois College of Medicine). To finance his medical education, Hektoen worked as an attendant and later a druggist in the Northern Hospital for the Insane in Oshkosh, Wisconsin. As a druggist, Hektoen had the opportunity to observe the work of the doctors and participate in autopsies. Hektoen graduated with an MD in 1887 as valedictorian of his class. Later that year, Hektoen placed first in an exam for an internship at the Cook County Hospital in Chicago. He began work as an intern in the fall of 1887. During his internship Hektoen trained under Christian Fenger, who influenced his decision to specialize in pathology.

== Career ==
=== Professional appointments ===
Hektoen began working as a pathologist at Cook County Hospital in 1889. The same year, he was hired as curator of the museum at Rush Medical College, and in 1890 he became a lecturer of pathology at Rush and physician to the Cook County coroner's office. Beginning in 1892, Hektoen held various professorships in pathology and morbid anatomy at Rush, the College of Physicians and Surgeons, and the University of Chicago, becoming head of the pathology department at Chicago in 1901. In 1933, he was appointed professor emeritus of pathology at the University of Chicago.

Hektoen served as president of many professional societies, including the Chicago Medical Society from 1919 to 1921, the American Association of Immunologists in 1927, and the Society of American Bacteriologists in 1929. In 1902, he was the founding director of the John McCormick Institute of Infectious Diseases, an organization dedicated to researching scarlet fever, which in 1943 was reopened as the Hektoen Institute for Medical Research. He served as a member of the National Advisory Health Council from 1934 to 1938, chaired the United States National Research Council from 1936 to 1938, and from 1937 to 1944 was executive director for the National Advisory Cancer Council.

Hektoen was editor of the Journal of Infectious Diseases from 1904 to 1941, and in 1926 was the founding editor of the Archives of Pathology (now the Archives of Pathology and Laboratory Medicine), continuing in this role until 1950. He also edited the Transactions of the Chicago Pathological Society and the Proceedings of the Institute of Medicine of Chicago, and wrote editorials for the Journal of the American Medical Association.

Throughout his career, Hektoen earned eight honorary degrees. In 1918 he became a member of the National Academy of Sciences, and he received, among other honors, the Order of St. Olaf in 1929 and the Distinguished Service Medal of the American Medical Association in 1942.

=== Research ===
Hektoen was a prolific writer, publishing over 300 medical papers on diverse subjects. In the early years of his career, Hektoen's publications consisted mainly of pathology case studies. In 1894, he published The technique of post-mortem examination, a textbook on autopsies for medical students at the Cook County Hospital. After 1897, he began to publish works on bacterial and fungal infections, and from 1900 onwards published many papers on forensic pathology, reflecting his work as an expert witness. In the early 1900s, Hektoen's research interests—influenced by his directorship of the John McCormick Institute—turned strongly towards infections and immunology. By 1906, Hektoen had begun studying blood groups and agglutination reactions of red blood cells. He proposed in 1907 that the "possible danger" of blood transfusions "can be avoided by the selection of a donor whose corpuscles are not agglutinated by the serum of the recipient and whose serum does not agglutinate the corpuscles of the latter". This made him the first to describe the principle of crossmatching. In 1917, while studying immunity in rabbits, he published a description of what is now known as the anamnestic response; and in 1933, working with William H. Welker, he introduced the use of aluminum hydroxide as an adjuvant to increase the immunogenic potential of injected antigens. Hektoen also conducted research into measles, tuberculosis and poliomyelitis and the use of blood cultures for diagnosis.

== Personal life and death ==
In 1891, during a brief stay in Europe, Hektoen married Ellen Strandh. They had two children, a daughter and a son, both of whom died prematurely. Hektoen died in Chicago on July 5, 1951, from complications of diabetes.

== Selected publications ==
- The technique of post-mortem examination. W.T. Keener Company. 1893.
- Isoagglutination of Human Corpuscles with Respect to Demonstration of Opsonic Index and to Transfusion of Blood. Journal of the American Medical Association, 48, pp. 1739–1740. 1907.
- On the Formation and Fate of Antibodies, in Harvey Lectures, 1909–1910, Philadelphia, J. B. Lippincott Company, pp. 150–191.
- Precipitin-Production in Allergic Rabbits. Journal of Infectious Diseases, 21, pp. 279–286, 1917.
- Precipitin Production in Rabbits Following Intramuscular Injection of Antigen Absorbed by Aluminum Hydroxide, Journal of Infectious Diseases, 53, pp. 309–311, 1933 (with W. H. Welker).
