= Bob Steele (swim coach) =

American competitive swimmer

Biographical details
- Born: circa 1939; Chicago, Illinois
- Education: Southern Illinois University; BA, Phys. Ed. 1961; MA, Education 1962

Playing career
- 1957-1961: Southern Illinois University; Carbondale, Ill.
- 1959-1962: Southern Illinois U. Carbondale Sharks (Student Coach)
- Positions: backstroke, student coach

Coaching career (HC unless noted)
- 1962-1966: Richwoods High School; Peoria
- 1966-1970: Deerfield High School
- 1970-1973: Northwestern University; Evanston, Ill.
- 1974-1984: Southern Illinois University; Head Swim Coach
- 1985-1987: Justus Aquatics, Director; Orlando International Aquatic Center
- 1987-1995: U.S. Swimming; Director, Athlete/Coach Development
- 1998-2004: California State; Bakersfield, Ca.
- 2005-2016: USA Swimming; Master Coach/Consultant

Accomplishments and honors

Championships
- 6 x National Independent Champions (Southern Illinois University); 5 x NCAA Division II Titles (California State Bakersfield)

Awards
- 4 x Division II Coach of the Year (California State Bakersfield); ASCA Hall of Fame; SIU Distinguished Alumnus; International Swimming Coaches Hall of Fame; CSCAA Top 100 Coaches of Century

Bob Steele was a competitive swimmer for Southern Illinois University and a collegiate swim coach for California State Bakersfield from 1997 through 2004 where he led the team to 5 NCAA Division II National Championships, and was named Division II Coach of the year four times. From 1984 through 1995, he was a director of athlete development for USA Swimming. Receiving wide recognition for his service to collegiate coaching and the American swimming community, he was selected as one of College Swimming Coaches Association of America's (CSCAA) Top 100 Coaches of the Century.

Steele was born around 1939 and graduated South Chicago's Chicago Fenger High School in 1957. Athletic from his early youth, his family lived on East 103rd Street, a few miles East of the Southern tip of Lake Michigan, and he played in a Junior Football League at the age of 14 sponsored by the Chicago Park District.

== Southern Illinois University ==
After High School, he attended Southern Illinois University in Carbondale, beginning in 1957, where he swam under Coach Bob Casey, receiving his Bachelor's degree in 1961, and a Masters from the College of Education and Human Services in 1962. He served as swimming team captain in 1958. In February 1959, he led Southern Illinois to defeat St. Louis by winning the 200-yard backstroke at a meet in Carbondale. In 1961, as a collegiate honor, he was recognized as the outstanding undergraduate in the Department of Physical Education at Southern Illinois. While at Southern Illinois, as a student coach and later as Head Swim Coach, he initially helped with the Carbondale Youth Swim Program, which became the Saluki Swim Club in 1961. As the Saluki Swim Club, the program was strengthened as it became more closely associated with the Southern Illinois University Saluki's swim program and facilities.

== Coaching ==
=== High school and club coaching in Illinois ===
In his early coaching career, Steele coached the Carbondale Sharks while completing graduate work at Southern Illinois University Carbondale from 1959 through 1962. He coached nine years in the Peoria area including four years at Richwoods High School from 1962-1966, and five years at Deerfield High School from 1966-70. During his tenure as a High School coach, he mentored 27 All American swimmers, three Illinois State Champions, three state record holders, and eight conference title teams. He has also coached club teams in Wichita, Kansas, and coached and managed Justus Aquatics, in Orlando, Fla.

== Collegiate, international, and club coaching ==
=== Northwestern ===
He was hired to coach swimming at Northwestern University in June 1970, and served from 1970 through 1973, replacing former 26-year veteran Coach Bill Peterson. His 1972-3 team, largely underclassmen, had 12 members with NCAA qualifying times, and finished 23rd in the NCAA championships.

=== Southern Illinois ===
In July 1973, he was hired to coach his Alma Mater Southern Illinois University at Carbondale (SIU) by Athletic Director Doug Weaver, where he remained through 1984. Steele improved the team record at Northwestern from losing seasons to a 7-3 finish in his last year. But unlike Northwestern University, SIU had a longer history of giving swimming scholarships, and his first-year team was strong, inheriting five All-Americans recruited by former coach Ray Essick. His SIU teams at Southern Illinois were six time winners of the National Independent Championship and in ten years finished their swimming season rated in the top 20 in NCAA Division I competition.

=== Justus Aquatics ===
In a relatively brief stint from 1985 through 1987, he coached and directed programs at Justus Aquatics, an exceptional facility in the Orlando International Aquatic Center, known since 2021 as the Rosen Aquatic Fitness Center on International Drive in Orlando. Three time Olympic medalist Rowdy Gaines did promotion for Justus Aquatics and also assisted with the teams and the summer skill camps. Harris Rosen, a prominent Orlando hotelier, former Disney executive and philanthropist who later helped update and fund the facility, swam at the Justus Aquatic Center by 1987. The Center was a frequent site for high profile national competition when Steele coached there and hosted the 1986 World Championship Trials, the 1986 U.S. Open, the 1985 U.S. Swimming National Championships, and the large YMCA Swimming and Diving Championships, but had some issues with sustained funding. The Center now offers a world class Olympic size 17 lane competition pool as well as a seven lane heated teaching pool, a motorized endless pool, a modern strength training facility, membership, group and private lessons, and a competitive Swim Academy for children and teenagers.

=== U.S. Swimming Director ===
From 1987 through 1995, he was the Director of Athlete Development for United States swimming. During his time as Director, he requested $300,000 to develop minority youth programs, though he was able to secure only $2,000. He was successful, however in hosting a minority Coach's clinic in Washington, D.C. that attracted 744 Black swimmers.

=== Cal State Bakersfield ===
Moving to the West Coast, one of his most distinguished periods of service was with California State Bakersfield where he coached from 1998 through 2004. His collegiate teams won five NCAA II National Championships in seven years at California State. One of his more outstanding swimmers was breast stroker Jason Shattenkirk, a state breast-stroke champion and three-time All-American at Cal State during Steele's early tenure from 1996-1999.

In 2004, Steele was named USA Swimming's first Master Coach Consultant, a part time position targeted at both enhancing athlete's performances, and improving coaching performances. From 2005 through 2016, he continued to work as a USA Swimming Master Coach/Consultant. The courses he taught and the lectures he presented during this period were largely of his own design and content, and gathered a wide audience.

Nineteen of his swimmers in 41 events have been world ranked and two American Record holders have been among swimmers he coached.

He has coached swimmers at the Pan Am Games, World Championships, Olympics, and sports festivals. He has coached U.S. teams in international meets.

Steele retired from coaching around 2016. In his retirement, he has produced acrylic paintings, as he minored in Art during his undergraduate studies at Southern Illinois.

=== Mentoring roles ===
An active participant in the swimming community, and a swimming mentor by 1973, he was co-chair of the World's Swimming Coach Clinic in Chicago. He led over 100 USA Team camps and over 50 Winning Spirit Racing Camps, a program he founded himself. He has served as a speaker to as many as 30,000 coaches at American Swimming Coaches Association (ASCA), International Swimming Federation (FINA), Local Swimming Committees (LSC) and the High School Coaches Associations. He is the author of the book, Games, Gimmicks, Challenges, for Swimming Coaches. The book focuses on hundreds of training ideas gleaned from hundreds of coaches for things Steele believed swimmers enjoyed learning and performing, in order to reach greater levels of success.

=== Honors ===
Steele became a member of the American Swimming Coaches Association (ASCA) Hall of Fame in 2016 and is a recipient of the Southern Illinois University (SIU) Distinguished Alumnus for Professional Achievements. He is also a member of the International Swimming Coaches of America Hall of Fame as of March 2022, and the somewhat exclusive College Swimming Coaches Association of America's (CSCAA) Top 100 Coaches of the last Century.
