= Chuck Ulrich =

American football player (1929–2006)

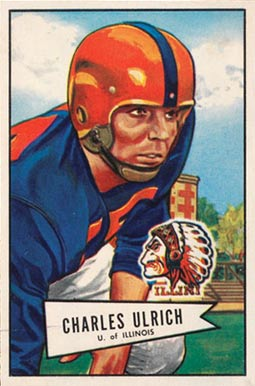
- Ulrich on a 1952 Bowman football card

No. 72
- Position: Defensive tackle

Personal information
- Born: December 14, 1929; Chicago, Illinois, U.S.
- Died: April 10, 2006 (aged 76); Beaufort, South Carolina, U.S.
- Listed height: 6 ft 4 in (1.93 m)
- Listed weight: 250 lb (113 kg)

Career information
- High school: Fenger Academy (Chicago)
- College: Illinois
- NFL draft: 1952: 4th round, 41st overall pick

Career history
- Chicago Cardinals (1954–1958)

Awards and highlights
- First-team All-American (1951); First-team All-Big Ten (1951)

Career NFL statistics
- Fumble recoveries: 6
- Stats at Pro Football Reference

Charles Ulrich Jr. (December 14, 1929 – April 10, 2006) was an American professional football player who was a defensive tackle for five seasons with the Chicago Cardinals of the National Football League (NFL) from 1954 to 1958.

Ulrich played college football for the Illinois Fighting Illini, who defeated Stanford 40–7 in the 1952 Rose Bowl to stake a claim for the national championship. He attended Fenger High School in Chicago.

After his football career, Ulrich was a physical education teacher at Joseph Warren Elementary School in Chicago during the 1960s.

He is a member of the Chicagoland Sports Hall of Fame.
