= Jay G. Lamberson =

American politician

Jay George Lamberson
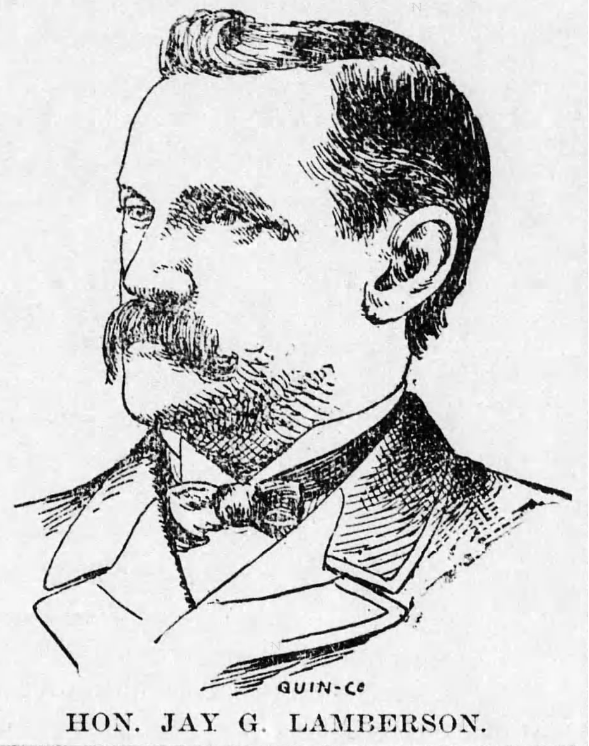
- Illustration of Jay G. Lamberson, 1895

Wisconsin State Assemblyman, Richland County
- In office 1891–1897
- Preceded by: Robert H. DeLap
- Succeeded by: William M. Fogo

Personal details
- Born: August 27, 1846 Elkhorn, Walworth County, Wisconsin
- Died: February 22, 1927 (aged 80) Richland Center, Richland County, Wisconsin
- Resting place: Willow Valley Cemetery
- Party: Republican Party
- Children: Bertha Lamberson; Mabel Zarifa (Lamberson) Sippy; Ward Elbert Lamberson; Laura Blanche (Lamberson) Smith; Lelia Maud Lamberson; Bartlett Fitch Lamberson
- Parents: Nicholas Lamberson (father); Sarah Rachel (Fitch) Lamberson (mother)
- Relatives: Bertram Welton Sippy, son-in-law
- Military career
- Allegiance: United States of America
- Branch: Union Army
- Service years: December 29, 1863 – July 3, 1865
- Rank: Private
- Unit: 6th Independent Battery Wisconsin Light Artillery

Jay George Lamberson (August 27, 1846 – February 22, 1927) was an American politician and member of the Wisconsin State Assembly.

== Biography ==
Lamberson was born on August 27, 1846, in what is now Elkhorn, Wisconsin. He moved with his parents in 1858 to Sextonville, Wisconsin. During the American Civil War, he served with the 6th Independent Battery Wisconsin Light Artillery of the Union Army. Jobs Lamberson held after returning home include schoolteacher before owning four near-by farms, including two dairy farms. He died on February 22, 1927, in Richland Center, Wisconsin.

On December 24, 1872, in Sextonville, Wisconsin, he married Jane Elizabeth Ward, a native of Paw Paw Township, DeKalb County, Illinois, and the daughter of Nathaniel Ward Jr., originally of Hampden, Maine, and Mary Came Bartlett, originally of Shapleigh.

His first surviving daughter, Mabel Z., married American physician Bertram Welton Sippy.

== Political career ==
Lamberson was elected to the Assembly in 1890, 1892 and 1894. In addition, he was a member of the city council of Richland Center. He was a Republican.

== Legacy ==
After his death, a resolution in his honor was unanimously adopted by the Wisconsin State Assembly. It reads as follows:

WHEREAS, Honorable Jay G. Lamberson of Richland Center, Richland County, a former member of the assembly, died February 22, 1927; and

WHEREAS, Jay G. Lamberson was born in Elkhorn, Walworth county, Wisconsin, on August 27, 1846, and later came to Richland county with his parents. His early education was obtained in the village of Sextonville where later he taught school. He enlisted as a private in the Sixth Wisconsin Battery December 29, 1863 and served his country until the close of the war, when he was mustered out at Madison, Wisconsin, July 3, 1865. December 24, 1872, he married Jennie Ward, who pre ceded him in death a little less than a year. To this marriage were born six children, three of whom survive the parents, Mrs. B. W. Sippy, Chicago, Illinois, Mrs. James Forsyth Smith and Ward Lamberson of Rich land Center. Mr. Lamberson held many offices of trust in the county and state.
WHEREAS, He represented Richland county in the as sembly for three terms, 1891, 1893 and 1895, during that time being chairman of the committee on state affairs. He was also a member of the city council of Richland Center. In all his business relations, he was capable and reliable, honored by the county in which he lived in a way that showed that the people trusted him and appreciated his merits. He always proved himself devoted to his duty, a man of integrity, earnestness, and sincerity of purpose. His sterling qualities set him above the average standard of humanity. His private life was characterized by simplicity, virtue, and devotion to his home, qualities which endeared him to his family, neighbors, and friends. He lived a kindly, Christian life, strong and helpful. As was said by Joseph of Aranathea, " He was a good man and just". Therefore, be it
Resolved by the assembly, That it expresses its deep ap preciation for the life and services of Jay G. Lamberson and extends its sympathy and condolence to his children. And be it further
Resolved, That an engrossed copy of this resolution, properly attested, be transmitted to the children of the deceased.
