= Fenger Academy High School (Chicago) =

Fenger High School
- Man entrance, 2015.

Location
- 11220 S. Wallace Street; Chicago, Illinois 60628; United States; 41°41′23″N 87°38′19″W

Information
- School type: Public; Secondary
- Opened: 1893
- CEEB code: 140745
- Principal: Mescha M. Robertson
- Grades: 9–12
- Gender: Coed
- Enrollment: 219 (2024–2025)
- Campus type: Urban
- Colors: Red; Green
- Athletics conference: Chicago Public League
- Team name: Titans
- Accreditation: North Central Association of Colleges and Schools
- Yearbook: Courier
- Website: fengerhighschool.org

Fenger Academy High School is a public 4-year high school located in the Roseland neighborhood on the far south side of Chicago, Illinois, United States. Fenger is a part of the Chicago Public Schools district and is named for Danish surgeon Christian Fenger. Fenger opened in 1893.

== History ==
When it opened in 1893, Fenger was known as Curtis School. The Chicago Board of Education renamed the school in 1915 in honor of a well-known Danish surgeon, Christian Fenger. The current Fenger building was constructed between 1924 and completed in 1926.

=== Other information ===
Fenger, along with its former principal Elizabeth Dozier and numerous staff and students was featured prominently in the 2014 CNN documentary series Chicagoland.

== Athletics ==
Fenger competes in the Chicago Public League (CPL) and is a member of the Illinois High School Association (IHSA). The school sport teams are stylized as the Titans. The boys' baseball team won an Illinois state title and placed first in 1945–46 and were public league champions four times; 1945–46, 1951–52, 1970, 1985–86. Fenger football team won Chicago prep bowls titles four times; 1937–38, 1939–40, 1944–45, 1953–54. The boys' golf team were public league champions two times; 1970–71, 1972–73. Fenger girls' basketball team were regional champions in 2012–2013.

== Notable alumni ==
- Andre Brown (1984) – NFL wide receiver (Miami Dolphins)
- Angeline Caruso (1940) – educator and educator administrator, Noted as the first woman to serve as superintendent of the Chicago Public Schools district
- Eleanor Dapkus (1941) – baseball player
- Sammy Esposito (1949) – baseball player for Chicago White Sox
- Montell Griffin (1988) – boxer
- Pamela Hutchinson (1976) – Singer, best known as a member of the R&B/soul group The Emotions.
- Larry "Flash" Jenkins (1973) – actor, film director, producer, and screenwriter
- Rich Kreitling (1955) – NFL wide receiver for the Cleveland Browns and Chicago Bears
- Eliot Ness (1921) – Prohibition agent, famed leader of The Untouchables
- Billy Rogell (1922) – MLB player (Boston Red Sox, Detroit Tigers, Chicago Cubs)
- Bob Steele (1957) - Southern Illinois University (SIU) swimmer, 1962 SIU graduate and Head Swim coach from 1973-1984, and Hall of Fame swim coach for California State Bakersfield from 1997-2004.
- Chuck Ulrich (1948) – football player
- Eleanor Wolf (1942) – All-American Girls Professional Baseball League player.
- Robert Zemeckis (1970) – screenwriter, Academy Award-winning director (Forrest Gump)
- Bob Zick (1945) – MLB player, Chicago Cubs (1954)
