= Esther Somerfeld-Ziskind =

American neurologist and psychiatrist (1901–2002)

- Born: July 2, 1901; Chicago, Illinois
- Died: November 11, 2002 (aged 101); Silver Lake, Los Angeles, California
- Citizenship: American
- Education: University of Chicago; Rush Medical College; University of California, Los Angeles
- Awards: Recipient Research Award California Medical Association; Honorary Award Southern California Psychiatric Society
- Scientific career
- Fields: Neurology; Psychology

Esther Somerfeld-Ziskind (July 2, 1901 – November 11, 2002) was an American neurologist and psychiatrist. She conducted pioneering research into the use of insulin, lithium, and electroconvulsive therapy in the treatment of psychiatric disorders. She was the daughter of Czech and Romanian immigrants. She received her medical degree in Chicago, Illinois, and her Masters in Los Angeles, California. After marrying Eugene Ziskind, they opened their own practice. Somerfeld-Ziskind was later chair of the psychiatry department at Cedars-Sinai Medical Center.

== Early life and education ==
Esther Somerfeld was born in 1901 in Chicago. She was the daughter of Russian and Romanian immigrants, Matilda and Emanuel Somerfeld, Esther worked her way through school during the 1920s as a secretary and as an editor for the Journal of the American Medical Association. While she planned to become a social worker, Somerfeld-Ziskind changed her mind to pursue pre-med at the University of Chicago. She received her medical degree at Rush Medical College in Chicago in 1925. That year, Somerfeld-Ziskind interned at Los Angeles County General Hospital and later completed a pediatric residency at Los Angeles Children's Hospital. She married Eugene Ziskind in 1928, whom she had met during her undergraduate studies at the University of Chicago. She left pediatrics and joined him on the path of specializing in neurology and psychiatry. In 1934, Somerfeld-Ziskind went on to earn her Masters of Arts in Psychology at the University of California at Los Angeles.

== Career and research ==
She and her husband, Eugene Ziskind, started their own small psychiatric practice on Wilshire Boulevard in Los Angeles during the Depression. They only charged patients at half price, and often received payment in the form of gifts. They had some expertise in treating disorders with convulsions. In 1938 they were using Metrazol to create convulsions in a patient with Parkinson's diseases which gave favourable results. This was remarkable as there were few ways of mitigating this disease, however Metrazol therapy was generally abandoned in 1941.

In 1953, she and her husband were cofounders along with Eugene's two brothers, social worker Louis Ziskind and attorney David Ziskind, of Gateways Hospital and Mental Health Center. (Gateways hospital was extant in 2015 and had 55 beds.) She also served as the chair of the psychiatry department at Cedars-Sinai Medical Center. Later in life, Somerfeld-Ziskind worked extensively as a faculty member of the medical school at the University of Southern California, teaching child psychiatry, group therapy, and psychopathology.

Throughout her career, Somerfeld-Ziskind and her husband worked together to research the use of insulin, lithium, and electroconvulsive therapy to treat psychiatric disorders. They published many research articles to esteemed journals such as American Journal of The Medical Sciences and the Journal of Nervous and Mental Disease. Some of these included:

- "Metrazol and Electric Convulsive Therapy of the Affective Psychoses"
- "Effect of Phenobarbital on the Mentality of Epileptic Patients"
- "Hydration Studies in Epilepsy"

== Awards ==
In 1931, Somerfeld-Ziskind earned an award for her research article titled "Meningeal Allergy in Tuberculosis" by the California Medical Association.

She and her husband began lecture-discussion groups at the old Cedars of Lebanon Hospital, which were the first group therapy sessions in the city. In 1987, they received an Honorary Award for distinguished service by the Southern California Psychiatric Society in 1987.

== Personal life ==
An accomplished classical pianist, Somerfeld-Ziskind owned two baby grands. She often hosted performances of eight-handed compositions that she played with friends. She was also an avid reader, and belonged to two book discussion clubs. Until the last year of her life, she wrote book reviews for the journal of the American Psychiatric Association, analyzing texts of 1,000 pages or more. While her husband of 65 years died in 1993, Somerfeld-Ziskind lived to be 101 years old. Up through her final year, she was still attending to patients at Los Angeles Children's Hospital, where she was remembered as "a legend". She died at her home in Silver Lake, Los Angeles, on November 11, 2002.
