= Truman W. Brophy =

American dentist

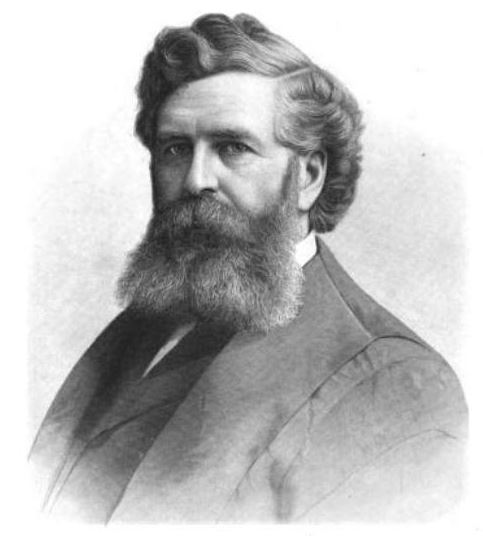
- Born: Truman William Brophy; April 12, 1848; Will County, Illinois
- Died: February 4, 1928 (aged 79); Los Angeles, California
- Resting place: Rosehill Cemetery
- Education: Elgin Academy; Pennsylvania College of Dental Surgery; Rush Medical School
- Occupation: Oral surgeon
- Spouse: Emma J. Mason (m. 1873)
- Children: 4

Truman William Brophy (April 12, 1848 – February 4, 1928) was an American oral surgeon. He's known to be the founder of the Chicago College of Dental Surgery. He also served as the American President of the Fourteenth International Medical Congress in Madrid in 1903. He created innovative techniques to correct cleft lip and cleft palate.

== Life ==
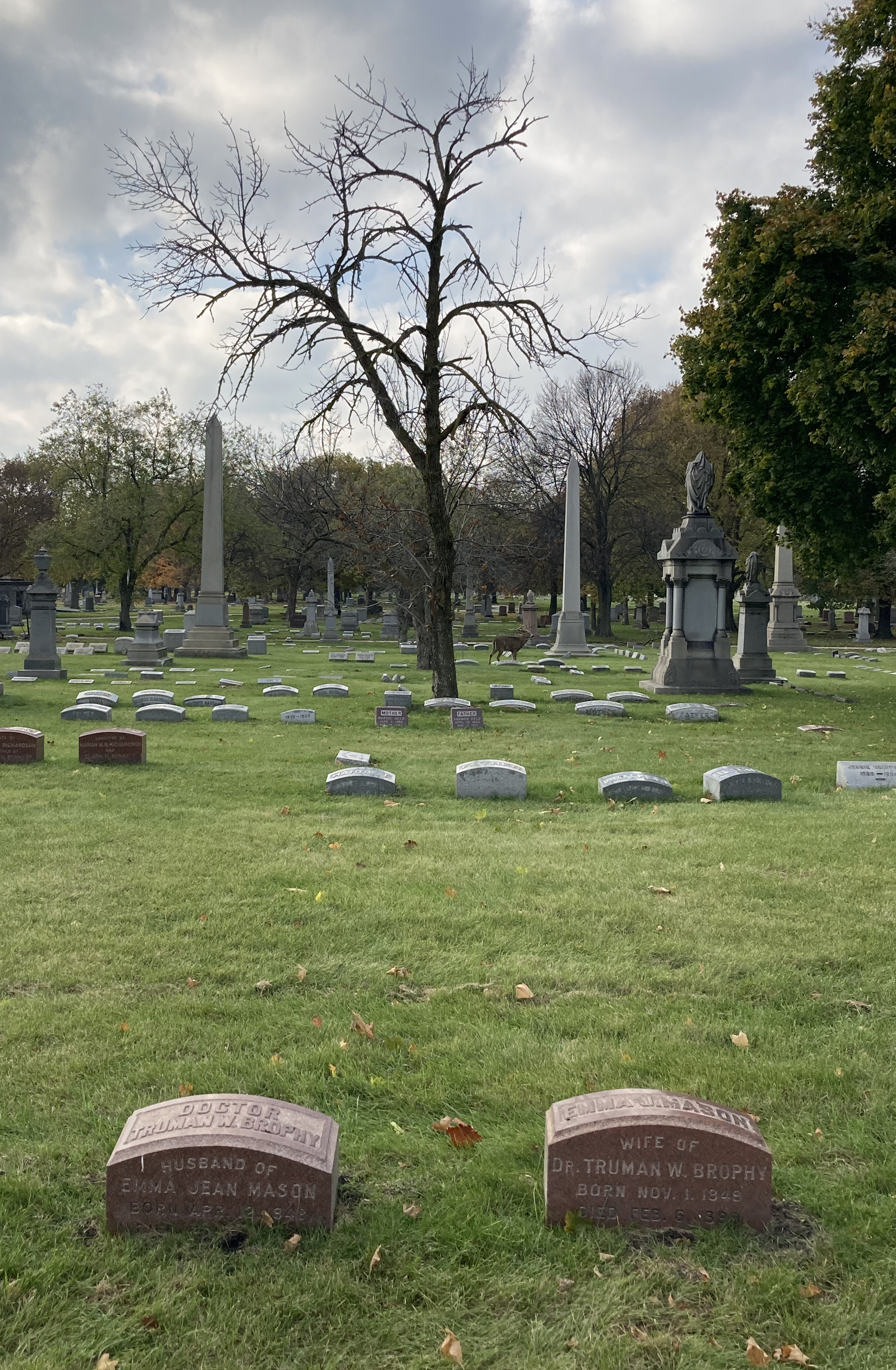
Brophy's grave at Rosehill Cemetery

He was born to William and Amelia Brophy in Will County, Illinois on April 12, 1848. He studied at Elgin Academy in his early years. Brophy went to California in 1852 for two years and upon his return to Illinois, he purchased a farm in Kane County, Illinois. In 1866, he studied at Dyrenfurths Business College when he was 19 years old. Dr. Brophy started working at a dental practice owned by Dr. J. O. Farnsworth. Upon the death of the owner of the practice, Brophy succeeded the practice of Farnsworth and started working there. The fire of 1871, destroyed his practice and Brophy became penniless. Instead of building a new practice, he decided to attend the Pennsylvania College of Dental Surgery and obtain his DDS there.

He married Emma J. Mason on May 8, 1873, and they had four children.

He then returned to Chicago, where he enrolled himself at Rush Medical School and obtained his Medical Degree in 1880. After graduating from Rush, Dr. Brophy became a faculty at the school and started teaching Dental Pathology and Surgery.

In 1882, Dr. Brophy founded the Chicago College of Dental Surgery. Brophy is known to develop tissue forceps, which are often used in cleft palate surgeries. Dr. Brophy also wrote a textbook on oral surgery in 1913.

He died in Los Angeles on February 4, 1928. He was buried at Rosehill Cemetery in Chicago.

== Awards and recognition ==
- Chicago College of Dental Surgery – Dean
- Odontological and Dental Societies of Chicago – President
- 14th International Medical Congress, Spain – President (1903)
