= Henry Tazelaar =

American pulmonary and cardiovascular pathologist

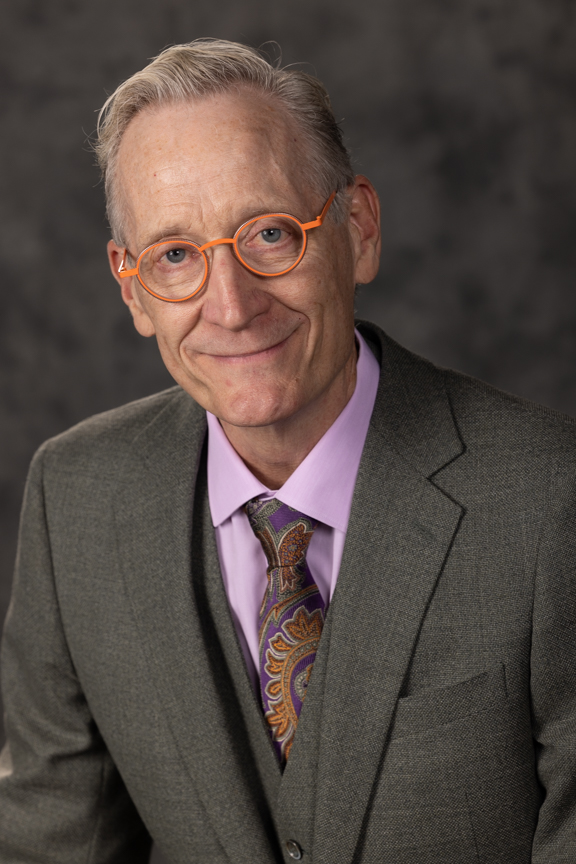
Henry D. Tazelaar, MD, pulmonary pathologist and Professor of Laboratory Medicine and Pathology at Mayo Clinic Arizona

Henry D. Tazelaar is an American pathologist, academic, and educator internationally recognized for his expertise in pulmonary and cardiovascular pathology. He is the Geraldine Colby Zeiler Professor of Cytopathology at the Mayo Clinic College of Medicine and Science, and the former Chair of the Department of Laboratory Medicine and Pathology at Mayo Clinic Arizona. He currently serves as President of the International Academy of Pathology (IAP) with his term ending in 2026. Tazelaar's research has contributed to international classification systems for lung disease, transplant pathology, and thoracic tumors, and he has authored or co-authored over 355 peer-reviewed publications and three textbooks.

== Education and early career ==
Tazelaar received his B.A. (with honors) from Calvin University in 1978 and his Doctor of Medicine from Rush Medical College of Rush University in 1983, where he was inducted into the Alpha Omega Alpha Honor Medical Society and received the Sir William Osler Pathology Award for Excellence in Pathology.

He completed an internship and residency in pathology at Stanford University Medical Center (1983–1985), followed by a postdoctoral fellowship supported by the National Institutes of Health (1985–1986) in the laboratory of Dr. Margaret E. Billingham, a pioneering figure in cardiac transplant pathology. He subsequently completed a fellowship in surgical pathology at Stanford (1986–1987) and served as Clinical Instructor in the Department of Pathology there (1987–1988). He was certified in Anatomic Pathology by the American Board of Pathology in 1988.

== Career ==
Tazelaar joined the Mayo Clinic in Rochester, Minnesota in 1988, where he worked for 17 years in the Division of Anatomic Pathology. He rose through the academic ranks from Assistant Professor (1988) to Associate Professor (1992) to full Professor of Laboratory Medicine and Pathology (1996), a rank he continues to hold at the Mayo Clinic College of Medicine and Science.

In 2005 he became a Consultant in the Division of Anatomic Pathology at Mayo Clinic in Scottsdale, Arizona. He served as Chair of the Department of Laboratory Medicine and Pathology at Mayo Clinic Arizona, and concurrently as Medical Director of the Mayo Clinic Office of Environmental Sustainability. He received the Geraldine Colby Zeiler Endowed Professorship in Cytopathology in 2017.

Tazelaar founded the Pulmonary Pathology Fellowship at Mayo Clinic Rochester in 1996, and subsequently established the ACGME-accredited Pulmonary Pathology Fellowship at Mayo Clinic Arizona, where he serves as Program Director. He has been described as an active educator providing mentorship to a multitude of residents and fellows, many of whom have gone on to faculty and research positions at major academic medical centers.

== Professional leadership ==
Tazelaar has served in leadership roles in several major national and international pathology organizations.

=== International Academy of Pathology (IAP) ===
Tazelaar has been a member of the International Academy of Pathology since 1990. He served as Treasurer of the IAP before being elected President-Elect in October 2022. He currently serves as President of the IAP (through 2026), representing the United States and Canadian Division.

=== Pulmonary Pathology Society ===
Tazelaar served as Secretary (1998–2000), Treasurer (2000–2002), Vice President (2002–2004), and President (2004–2006) of the Pulmonary Pathology Society.

=== Other societies ===
He has served on the board of the United States and Canadian Academy of Pathology (USCAP) and has chaired its Foundation Committee. He has also served on multiple committees of the College of American Pathologists, the International Society for Heart and Lung Transplantation (ISHLT), and the American Thoracic Society. He was President of the History of Pathology Society from 2019 to 2020.

== Research and contributions ==
Tazelaar's research has focused on refining criteria used to diagnose the rejection of transplanted hearts and lungs, identifying new pulmonary diseases, and developing better ways to evaluate tissue samples for the diagnosis of lung and pleural disease. His observations have led to the identification of several new or unusual pulmonary conditions and helped standardize the way pathologists report findings to clinicians.

=== Transplant pathology ===
Tazelaar is a co-author of the working formulations that provide standardized guidelines for pathologists interpreting lung and heart biopsies from transplant patients. These were published as revisions of the 1996 and 1990 working formulations in the Journal of Heart and Lung Transplantation and remain the standard reference in transplant pathology.

=== Pulmonary lymphangioleiomyomatosis ===
Tazelaar was part of the team that described pulmonary lymphangioleiomyomatosis (LAM) — a disease that occurs almost exclusively in women — in a male patient, expanding understanding of the disease's pathophysiology.

=== Acute eosinophilic pneumonia ===
Tazelaar's 1997 paper on acute eosinophilic pneumonia, published in the American Journal of Respiratory and Critical Care Medicine, demonstrated that the pathologic finding in these cases was diffuse alveolar damage with prominent eosinophils, establishing the histopathologic criteria that remain in use today.

=== Vaping-associated lung injury (EVALI) ===
During the 2019 national outbreak of e-cigarette or vaping product use-associated lung injury (EVALI), Tazelaar was a co-author on one of the first papers to characterize the pathological findings of the disease. Published in the New England Journal of Medicine, the paper described lung biopsy findings from 17 patients and helped establish the histopathologic spectrum of EVALI, contributing to its recognition as a distinct clinical entity.

== Textbooks and selected publications ==
=== Textbooks ===
Tazelaar has contributed to several major reference works in pathology:

- Thurlbeck's Pathology of the Lung, 3rd edition (2005), co-edited with Andrew Churg, Jeffrey L. Myers, and Joanne L. Wright (Thieme Publishing Group, ISBN 1-58890-288-9). The first edition of this work won the Medical Textbook of the Year award from the Royal Society of Medicine/Society of Authors in 2005.
- Neoplastic Mimics in Thoracic and Cardiovascular Pathology (2013), co-authored with Mark R. Wick (Demos Medical Publishing).
- Atlas of Pulmonary Pathology: A Pattern Based Approach (2021), co-authored with Yasmeen M. Butt (Elsevier, ISBN 9780323639279).

=== Selected peer-reviewed publications ===
- Tazelaar HD, Linz LJ, Colby TV, Myers JL, Limper AH. Acute eosinophilic pneumonia: histopathologic findings in nine patients. Am J Respir Crit Care Med. 1997;155(1):296–302.
- Aubry MC, Myers JL, Ryu JH, Henske EP, Logginidou H, Jalal SM, Tazelaar HD. Pulmonary lymphangioleiomyomatosis in a man. Am J Respir Crit Care Med. 2000;162(2 Pt 1):749–752.
- Stewart S, Fishbein MC, Snell GI, Berry GJ, Boehler A, Burke MM, Tazelaar HD, et al. Revision of the 1996 working formulation for the standardization of nomenclature in the diagnosis of lung rejection. J Heart Lung Transplant. 2007;26(12):1229–1242.
- Stewart S, Winters GL, Fishbein MC, Tazelaar HD, Kobashigawa J, et al. Revision of the 1990 working formulation for the standardization of nomenclature in the diagnosis of heart rejection. J Heart Lung Transplant. 2005;24(11):1710–1720.
- Homme JL, Aubry MC, Edwards WD, Bagniewski SM, Pankratz VS, Kral CA, Tazelaar HD. Surgical pathology of the ascending aorta: a clinicopathologic study of 513 cases. Am J Surg Pathol. 2006;30(9):1159–1168.
- Klein JRH, Tazelaar HD, Leslie KO, Colby TV. One hundred consecutive granulomas in a pulmonary pathology consultation practice. Am J Surg Pathol. 2010;34(10):1456–1464.
- Castonguay MC, Ryu JH, Yi ES, Tazelaar HD. Granulomas and giant cells in hypersensitivity pneumonitis. Hum Pathol. 2015;46(4):607–613.
- Butt YM, Smith ML, Tazelaar HD, Vaszar LT, Swanson KL, et al. Pathology of Vaping-Associated Lung Injury. N Engl J Med. 2019;381(18):1780–1781.
- Fraune C, Churg A, Yi ES, et al. Lymphoid Interstitial Pneumonia (LIP) Revisited. Am J Surg Pathol. 2023;47(3):281–295.
- Porter AB, Noe KH, Tazelaar HD, et al. A Journey Toward Gender Equity in Medicine. Mayo Clin Proc. 2023;98(5):657–661.
- Churg A, Tazelaar H, Matej R, et al. Pathologic Criteria for the Diagnosis of Usual Interstitial Pneumonia vs Fibrotic Hypersensitivity Pneumonitis in Transbronchial Cryobiopsies. Mod Pathol. 2023;36(9):100221.
- Churg A, Wright JL, Manchen P, et al. A Brief Guide to Interpreting Transbronchial Cryobiopsies for Diffuse Parenchymal Lung Disease. Am J Surg Pathol. 2025;49(10):1068–1077.
- Tazelaar HD, Aubry MC, Roden AC, et al. Twenty-Four Years' Experience With a Pulmonary Pathology Journal Club: What Have We Learned? Arch Pathol Lab Med. 2025;149(10):960–967.
