= Chicago Dental Infirmary =

First dental school in Chicago, Illinois

Coordinates: 41°52′26″N 87°40′16.5″W

The Chicago Dental Infirmary was the first dental school in Chicago. It only accepted students that already possessed Doctor of Medicine degrees, making it a post-doctorate school. Training consisted of two courses of lectures in dentistry. A year after opening, the school changed its name to the Chicago College of Dental Surgery.

== Background ==
In the early part of the 1800s dentistry was perceived to be a mechanical activity requiring only manipulative dexterity to extract an offending tooth. In many cities the role of dentist was the domain of the barber, watchmaker, blacksmith, etc. In the middle of the century dental training had become more formal and there was considerable debate whether dentistry was a separate profession or a part of the medical field. By the end of the 1800s it had been decided that dentistry was a separate profession that included some medical training (basic science and anatomy).

Discussions among the dentists in Chicago about starting a dental school began in the 1860s. On January 26, 1864 staff members of Rush Medical College held the first meetings about founding a dental school, this would be followed by several more meetings over the next 5 years. Rush Medical College decided to start a dental department and on March 12, 1869 a charter was issued to found the Chicago Dental College, but all attempts to put this charter in to operation failed.

In 1875-76 a small number of Chicago dentists (Oliver, Danforth, Henry Palmer Wadsworth and Balney) began providing a series of dentistry related lecture in the evenings, three or four times a week. They were attended by 12 to 15 dentists among them E D Swain, C P Pruyn, R E Koch, J W Wassell, Truman W. Brophy, A W Harlan, Frank H B Gardner and Edmund Noyes. These lectures have been referred to as the beginning of dental education in Chicago.

Rush Medical College, having failed to establish a dental school, appealed to the Chicago Dental Society to look into the matter and in September 1876 a committee was appointed to do so. They concluded that the educational environment at the time was not favorable for organizing a dental school. Another meeting among dentists in 1880 also did not produce a school. In the summer of 1882 the situation had changed and progress was made in establishing Chicago first dental school. On February 20, 1883 a charter was issued for the Chicago Dental Infirmary, Collegiate Department.

== History ==
When the Chicago Dental Infirmary opened on March 12, 1883 its initial faculty included G V Black, W L Copeland, W T Belfield, L L McArthur, L P Haskell, Truman W Brophy, Edmund Noyes, and A W Harlan. Generally salaries were not paid for lecture courses as the honor, pleasure and other indirect benefits of an association with an educational institute was considered sufficient compensation.

On June 30, 1884 the school was rechartered and the name changed to Chicago College of Dental Surgery. The school also dropped its requirement that all students already have a Doctor of Medicine degree and changed it to a requirement that students need only be matriculating in such a degree, this eventually lead to the dropping of any medical degree requirement.

== Antecedence ==
As the Chicago College of Dental Surgery an affiliation was developed with the Lake Forest University in 1890. This arrangement resulted in the school being referred to as the Lake Forest University Dental Department. This affiliation was dissolved in 1902 and the Chicago College of Dental Surgery operated unaffiliated for a couple of years until it affiliated with Valparaiso University in 1905. In 1918 this affiliation ended when World War I forced Valparaiso University into bankruptcy. The school remained unaffiliated until it merged with the Loyola University Dental School in 1926.

== See also ==
- 1897 Chicago Dental Infirmary football team
