= Howard Taylor Ricketts =

American pathologist (1871–1910)

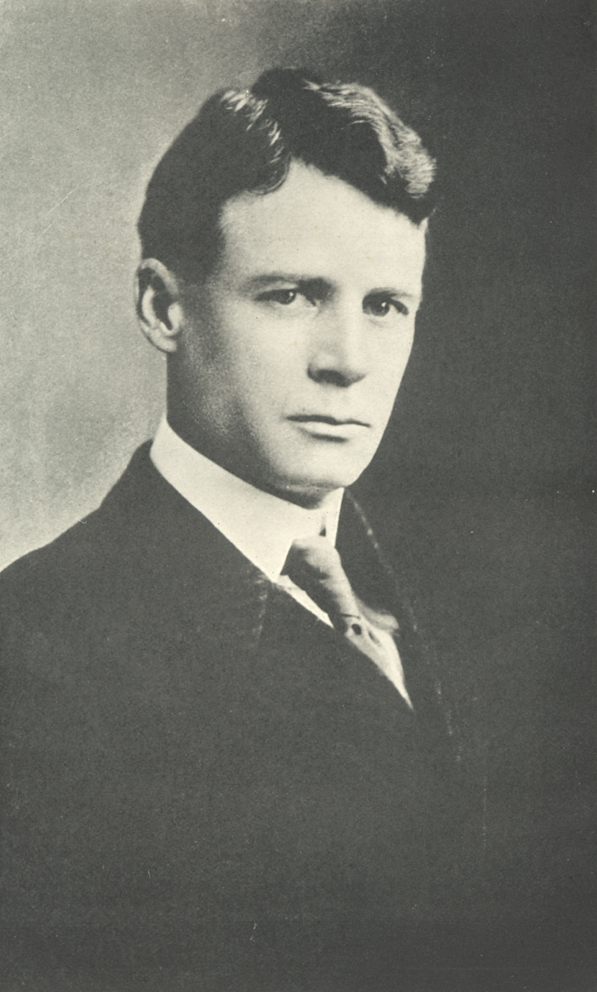
- Born: February 9, 1871; Findlay, Ohio, United States
- Died: May 3, 1910 (aged 39); Mexico City, Mexico
- Known for: Blastomycosis, bacillus, typhus
- Scientific career
- Fields: Bacteriology

Howard Taylor Ricketts (February 9, 1871 – May 3, 1910) was an American pathologist after whom the bacteria family Rickettsiaceae and the order Rickettsiales are named.

== Biography ==
He was born in Findlay, Ohio. In the early part of his career, Ricketts undertook research at Northwestern University on blastomycosis. He later worked in the Bitterroot Valley of Montana and at the University of Chicago on Rocky Mountain spotted fever. This early pathology, entomology and epidemiology research in Hamilton, Montana led to the eventual formation of the Rocky Mountain Laboratories there.

While in Montana, Ricketts and his assistant discovered that the vector that carried the pathogen for Rocky Mountain spotted fever is a tick, the Rocky Mountain wood tick (Dermacentor andersoni; some other species of ticks, such as the American dog or wood tick, Dermacentor variabilis, also are vectors). It was not at once clear what kind of organism the pathogen was; eventually it was named Rickettsia, the first of the Rickettsiales to be identified. However, for decades, until electron microscopy and other technologies became sufficiently advanced, it was not known whether Rickettsiales were bacteria, viruses, or something in between. They now are known to be bacteria specialised for intracellular parasitism.

Ricketts was devoted to his research and, on several occasions, injected himself with pathogens to study their effects. The pathogen causing Rocky Mountain spotted fever, Rickettsia rickettsii was named after him. After this eponymous genus, the larger family and order were given their names.

In 1910, Ricketts became interested in a strain of murine-carried typhus known as tabardillo due to a major outbreak in Mexico City, and the apparent similarity of the disease to spotted fever. Days after isolating the organism that he believed caused typhus, he himself died of the disease. His last papers were written in collaboration with R. M. Wilder.

Following his death, his family established an annual student research prize, the Howard Taylor Ricketts Prize, at the University of Chicago in 1912. Noteworthy recipients of the Ricketts Prize include Julian Herman Lewis (1913), Lauretta Bender (1923), Sara Elizabeth Branham (1924), Gail Monroe Dack (1925), and Maurice Hilleman (1945).
