= Herbert Sheetz =

American football coach (1882–1958)

Herbert Scheetz
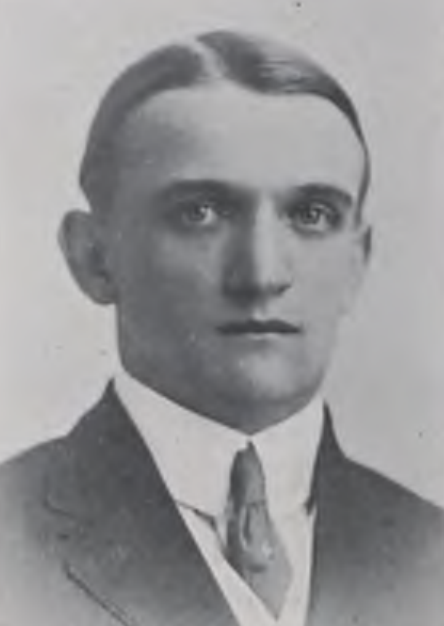
- Sheetz pictured in the Kaldron 1908, Allegheny yearbook

Biographical details
- Born: March 4, 1882; Haycock Township, Bucks County, Pennsylvania, U.S.
- Died: April 14, 1958 (aged 76); Allentown, Pennsylvania, U.S.

Coaching career (HC unless noted)
- 1907–1908: Allegheny

Head coaching record
- Overall: 7–7–3

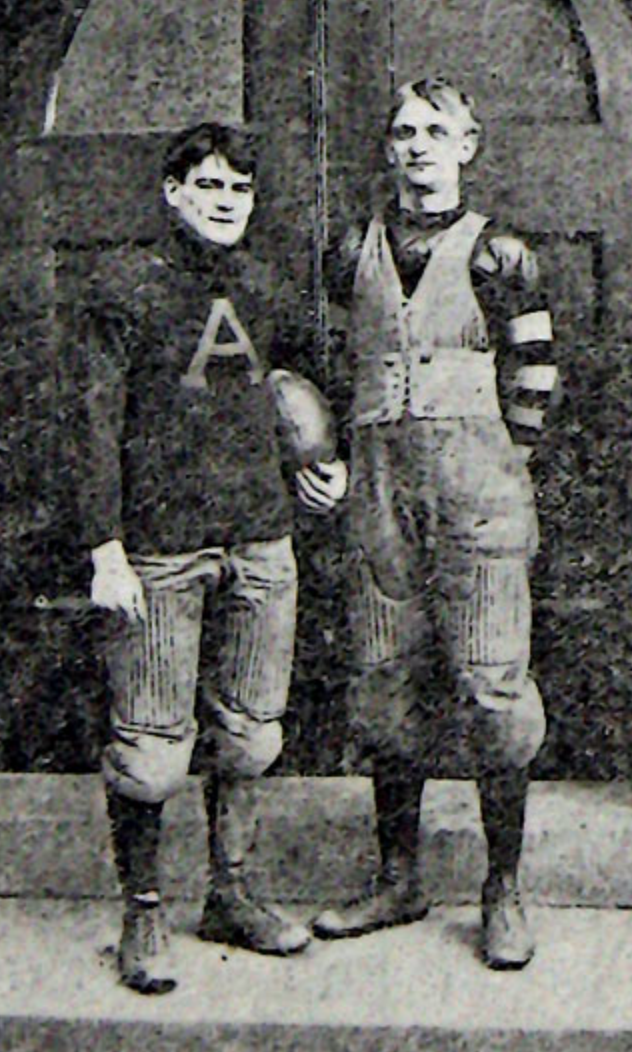
Herbert Sheetz with Captain Benedict of the 1907 Allegheny team

Herbert Nicholas Sheetz (March 4, 1882 – April 14, 1958) was an American college football coach. He served as the head football coach at Allegheny College in Meadville, Pennsylvania from 1907 to 1908, compiling a record of 7–7–3.

== Biography ==
Born in 1882 in Bucks County, Pennsylvania, Sheetz attended the Mercersburg Academy (1902), and Jefferson Medical College (1906), where he earned his M.D. degree. He subsequently entered medical practice as a physician at a hospital in McKeesport, Pennsylvania, serving there 1906 to 1907.

== Death ==
Sheetz died on April 14, 1958, in Allentown, Pennsylvania.

== Head coaching record ==
Year	Team	Overall	Conference	Standing	Bowl/playoffs
Allegheny Gators (Independent) (1907–1908)
1907	Allegheny	5–3–2			
1908	Allegheny	2–4–1			
Allegheny:		7–7–3			
Total:		7–7–3			
