= Archives of Pathology & Laboratory Medicine =

- Discipline: Pathology
- Language: English
- Edited by: Philip T. Cagle

Publication details
- Former name(s): Archives of Pathology
- History: 1976–present
- Publisher: College of American Pathologists
- Frequency: monthly
- Impact factor: 4.094 (2019)

Standard abbreviations
- ISO 4: Arch. Pathol. Lab. Med.

Indexing
- CODEN: APLMAS
- ISSN: 0003-9985 (print); 1543-2165 (web)
- OCLC no.: 02300010

Links
- Journal homepage; College of American Pathologists; American Medical Association

The Archives of Pathology & Laboratory Medicine (Arch Pathol Lab Med) is a core clinical medical journal published by the College of American Pathologists and the American Medical Association. It continues in series publications entitled the Archives of Pathology and Laboratory Medicine (1926–28), the Archives of Pathology (1928–50), the A.M.A. Archives of Pathology (1950–60), and the Archives of Pathology (1960–75).
