= James B. Herrick =

American physician

James Herrick
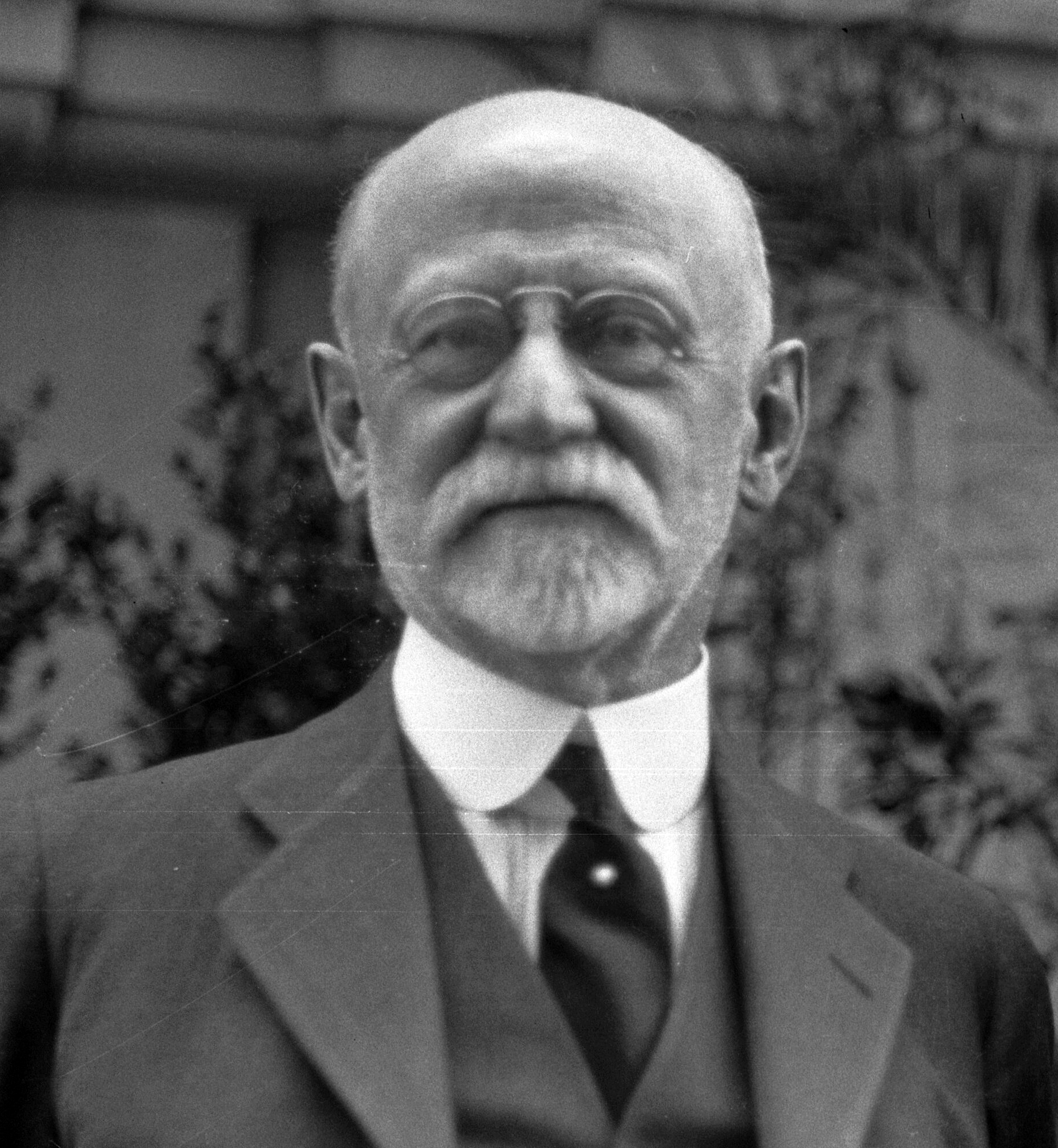
- Herrick in 1927
- Born: 11 August 1861; Oak Park, Illinois
- Died: 7 March 1954 (aged 92); Chicago, Illinois
- Education: University of Michigan; Rush Medical College
- Known for: Sickle-cell disease Myocardial infarction
- Scientific career
- Fields: Medicine

James Bryan Herrick (11 August 1861 in Oak Park, Illinois – 7 March 1954 in Chicago, Illinois) was an American physician and professor of medicine who practiced and taught in Chicago. He is credited with the description of sickle-cell disease and was one of the first physicians to describe the symptoms of myocardial infarction.

== Biography ==
Herrick was born in Oak Park, Illinois, of parents Origen White Herrick and Dora Kettlestrings Herrick (who was considered the oldest native daughter of Oak Park, because her father had homesteaded there). He attended Oak Park and River Forest High School and nearby Rock River Seminary. He received a BA degree from the University of Michigan in 1882, after which he taught school in Peoria, Illinois and Oak Park.

Herrick married Zellah P. Davies of Oak Park. After a few years of teaching in the public schools he entered Rush Medical College, and received a medical degree in 1888. He interned at Cook County Hospital, after which he opened a private practice in the Chicago area. He also obtained a part-time teaching position at Rush College, and was listed as a full professor there from 1900 through 1927. He was also on the staff of Presbyterian Hospital in Chicago from 1895 through 1945.

== Medical discoveries ==
Herrick studied and taught at various Chicago hospitals. His first discovery, in 1910, was that of sickle-shaped red blood cells on the blood film of a dental student from Grenada. His description of the student's disease was known for many years as Herrick's syndrome, and is now known as sickle-cell disease. The condition is prevalent in West Africa.

Herrick's second major contribution was a landmark article on myocardial infarction ("heart attack") in JAMA in 1912. He proposed that thrombosis in the coronary artery leads to the symptoms and abnormalities of heart attacks and that this was not inevitably fatal. While Herrick was not the first to propose this, ultimately his article was the most influential, although at the time it received only limited attention. In 1918 he was one of the first to encourage electrocardiography in the diagnosis of myocardial infarction.

Herrick is not closely associated with genetics, but his discoveries turned out to be inherited traits, so his contributions pointed other researchers toward genetically-based conditions.

== Books ==
- Herrick, J. B. (1895). A Handbook of Medical Diagnosis for Students. United States: Lea Brothers & Company.
- James Bryan Herrick - an appreciation - a compilation of Herrick papers, edited by William W. Holmes. Published in 1935 LCCN: 36014236 LC: R154.H38H6

== Services, awards and honors ==
Herrick served as president of several medical associations, including the Chicago Pathological Society, the Chicago Society of Internal Medicine, the Association of American Physicians, the American Heart Association, the Institute of Medicine (Chicago chapter), and the Society of Medical History (Chicago chapter).

He received an honorary degree (Master of Arts) from the University of Michigan (1907), and an honorary degree (Doctor of Law) from UM (1932).

He received the George H. Kober Medal from the Association of American Physicians (1930).

Herrick received the Distinguished Service Cross from the American Medical Association (1939).

He traveled several times to Europe in order to further his medical education. He actively participated in and supported the Chicago Literary Club all his life. He was an avid student of Geoffrey Chaucer's writings.

The collected papers were donated to Rush Medical College after his death. A portion of his collected papers had also been donated to the University of Chicago before his death.

He is commemorated by an annual award and a memorial lecture.
