= Rush Medical College =

Medical school of Rush University, Chicago, Illinois, US

Coordinates: 41°52′25.1″N 87°40′10.2″W

- Type: Private
- Established: 1837; 189 years ago
- Parent institution: Rush University
- Endowment: $632 million (2018)
- Dean: Cynthia Brincat (interim)
- Faculty: 2,600
- Students: 525
- Location: Chicago, Illinois, US
- Campus: Urban
- Website: www.rushu.rush.edu/rush-medical-college

Rush Medical College is the medical school of Rush University, a private research university in Chicago, Illinois. Established in 1837, it is affiliated with Rush University Medical Center, and John H. Stroger Jr. Hospital of Cook County.

== History ==
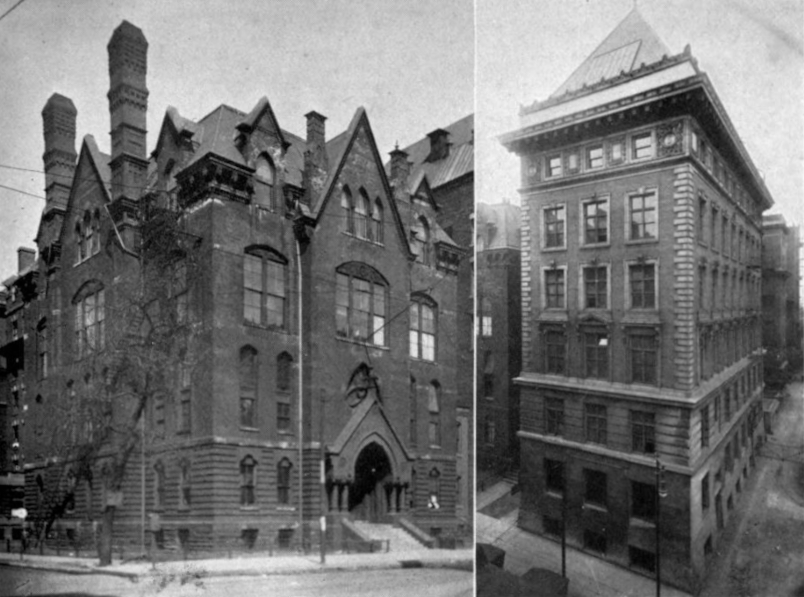
Rush Medical College and Senn Hall in 1922

Rush Medical College was one of the first medical colleges in the state of Illinois and was chartered in 1837, two days before the city of Chicago was chartered, and opened with 22 students on December 4, 1843. Its founder, Daniel Brainard, named the school in honor of Benjamin Rush, the only physician with medical school training to be a signatory of the Declaration of Independence. He later taught Meriwether Lewis the basic medical skills for his expedition with William Clark to the Pacific Northwest. Rush was also known as the "Father of American Psychiatry".

During the early 1860s, Rush Medical College staff members started discussions on establishing a dental department. On March 12, 1869, a charter was issued to found the Chicago Dental College, which was intended to be Chicago's first dental school. All attempts to put this charter into operation failed, however, and an appeal was made to the Chicago Dental Society to become involved. As a result, on February 20, 1883, a charter was issued for the Chicago Dental Infirmary, which opened on March 12, 1883.

During the college's first century, more than 10,000 physicians received their training there. Rush Medical College was affiliated with Lake Forest College from 1887 to 1898 and with the University of Chicago from 1898 until 1941.

With the onset of World War II, the medical college temporarily suspended its educational program, although it continued as an institution. Its faculty continued undergraduate and graduate teaching of medicine and the biological sciences as members of the faculty of the University of Illinois. The charter of the medical college was reactivated in 1969 when it became part of Rush-Presbyterian-St. Luke's Medical Center. In 1971, Rush Medical College reopened with a class of 61 first-year students and 30 third-year students.

== Students ==
For the 2016–2017 academic year, Rush Medical College had 515 medical students. For the entering class of 2016–2017, a total of 10,754 applications were received, with 138 students matriculating. For the class of 2022–23, 14,247 applications were received with 144 matriculating.

== Curriculum ==
In 2010, the Rush Medical College curriculum implemented a system-based curriculum. Each organ system is organized into individual blocks that integrates material from anatomy, biochemistry, histology, physiology, microbiology, pathophysiology, immunology, and pharmacology. Preclinical years are graded as Pass/Fail, and clinical years are graded as Honors, High Pass, Pass, Fail. There are currently no external or internal rankings for preclinical students.

Concurrently, students in the first two years are enrolled in the EXPLORE Program. This program introduces students to various aspects of medicine and provides hands-on physical examination training. Students obtain clinical experience starting in the first weeks of school as they are required to work alongside a mentoring physician in any field of choice. An evidence-based medicine (EBM) course is included during the first and second year. A USMLE Step 1 passing score is required for promotion into the clinical years. USMLE Step 2 CK and CS must be taken by November 1 of the fourth year, and passing both is required for graduation.

== Notable alumni ==
- J. M. Adams – Member of the Wisconsin State Assembly in 1870
- Charles Erwin Booth – Member of the Wisconsin State Assembly
- Truman W. Brophy – Founder of Chicago Dental Infirmary
- Henry Arthur Callis – One of the founders of Alpha Phi Alpha
- Myron S. Cohen – Protocol chair for the HPTN 052 study which was regarded by the journal Science as the breakthrough of the year in 2011
- Mabel Evelyn Elliott - Medical Director for refugees in Greece, ran world's largest refugee center.
- Ruth Darrow – physician who first identified the cause of hemolytic disease of the newborn
- Daniel Downs – Member of the Wisconsin State Assembly and of the Wisconsin State Senate
- Samuel Abbott Ferrin – Member of the Wisconsin State Assembly
- Morris Fishbein – Editor of JAMA from 1924 to 1950. He was notable for exposing quacks and debunking dubious medical practices.
- Evarts Graham – Thoracic surgeon best known for his research linking smoking to lung cancer
- James B. Herrick – physician who first described sickle cell anemia, and a type of myocardial infarction.
- Marie Agnes Hinrichs – a national president of Sigma Delta Epsilon
- Ernest E. Irons – president of the American Medical Association (AMA), the American College of Physicians and the American Association for the Study and Control of Rheumatic Diseases.
- Edwin Herman Lennette — virologist and pioneer of diagnostic virology
- Julian Herman Lewis – African-American pathologist known for his research on medicine and race
- Andrew Caldwell Mailer – Member of the Wisconsin State Senate from 1897 to 1901
- Robert E. Minahan – Mayor of Green Bay, Wisconsin
- Clem Neacy – End and tackle in the NFL, surgeon
- Dean Harold Noyes – Dean of Oregon Dental School
- David J. Peck – In 1847, became the first African American to receive a Doctor of Medicine degree from an American medical school
- Benoni Reynolds – Member of the Wisconsin State Assembly in 1876 and of the Wisconsin State Senate from 1878 to 1879
- James C. Reynolds – Member of the Wisconsin State Assembly and of the Wisconsin State Senate
- C. A. Robins – Governor of Idaho (1947–1951)
- Robert Holbrook Smith ("Dr. Bob") – Co-founder of Alcoholics Anonymous
- Esther Somerfeld-Ziskind – neurologist and psychiatrist
- Benjamin H. Southworth – Physician and member of the University of Michigan 1901 National Championship football team.
- Jules C. Stein - Ophthalmologist and businessman. Co-founder of Music Corporation of America, Inc (MCA).
- Benjamin Franklin Stephenson – Union Army surgeon and founder of the Grand Army of the Republic
- Michael Stuart – Mayo Clinic sports physician and orthopedic surgeon
- Henry Tazelaar – lung, heart and transplant pathologist
- Max Thorek - founder of International College of Surgeons, International Museum of Surgical Science, and Thorek Memorial Hospital.
- Ruth May Tunnicliff – bacteriologist, medical researcher
- Murray Sanders, U.S. Army Medical Corps officer nominated for Nobel Prize in Medicine
- W. Ian Lipkin, Virus Hunter, inventor of molecular tools for pathogen discovery

== See also ==
- James Oliver Van de Velde, Bishop of Chicago, founder of hospital taken over by Rush Medical College
- West Loop

== Bibliography ==
- Irons, Ernest E. (1953). The Story of Rush Medical College. Chicago: Board of Trustees of Rush Medical College.
