= Katharine C. Day =

American ornithologist

- Born: Katharine Clark; February 10, 1891; Boston, Massachusetts, U.S.
- Died: March 27, 1975 (aged 84); Cheshire, Connecticut
- Scientific career
- Fields: Ornithology

Katharine "Kitty" Harding Day (née Clark; February 10, 1891 – March 27, 1975) was an American ornithologist from Boston. She was one of the first American women to use bird banding to study the nesting behavior of native American birds.

Her pioneer studies of the nesting behavior of the veery (Catharus fuscescens) foreshadowed the discovery of cooperative parental care in that species nearly a century later. She conducted one of the first studies of the nesting biology of the black-throated blue warbler (Setophaga caerulescens). Her many contributions to Life Histories of North American Birds (1919– 1968), edited by Arthur Cleveland Bent, were invariably credited under the name "Mrs. Richard B. Harding".

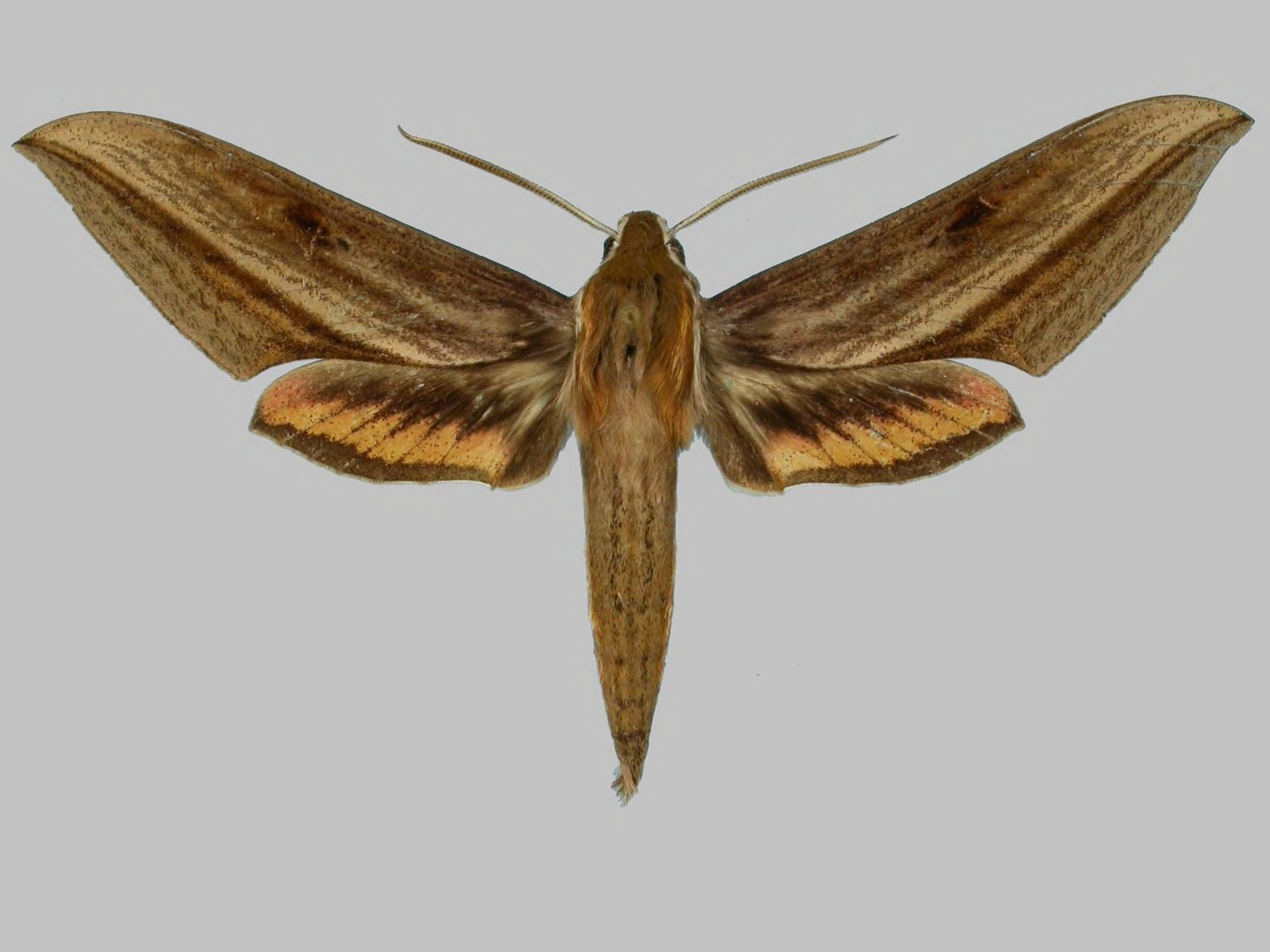
Xylophanes katharinae, a Mexican species of sphinx moth named after Katharine (Clark) Harding Day.

She is the namesake of a sphinx moth, Xylophanes katharinae, which was described by her father in 1931: "I have given this form the name [Xylophanes] katharinae in honor of my daughter Mrs. Richard B. Harding, because of her keen interest in science and because this form is so close to X. josephinae, named for my wife."

== Biography ==
=== Family and marriage ===
Katharine Clark was born in Boston, Massachusetts, the daughter of the entomologist Benjamin Preston Clark (1860–1939) and Josephine Clark (1868–?).

At the age of 21, she married Richard Bruce Harding (1888–1945) at Saint Stephen's Episcopal church in Cohasset, Massachusetts, on June 8, 1912. They had two sons, Richard Jr. (1913) and Robert (1917).

After Richard's death, Katharine married her second husband, Freeman Day, on June 12, 1948, and relocated to Eugene, Oregon.

=== Ornithology ===
Katharine and her husband set up a bird banding station in Cohasset in 1922.

From 1925 to 1932, she published 15 times under the name K. C. Harding, most of which were brief reports of recaptured banded birds in the Bulletin of the Northeastern Bird Banding Association (including its inaugural issue) and occasional notes on nesting behavior of various species.

In 1924, Katharine spent five weeks near Holderness, New Hampshire. The following year, she published a short paper called "Semi-colonization of Veeries", in which she reported a high density of nests and no aggression among male veeries, foreshadowing the discovery of cooperative parental care and flexible mating systems in that species in 2011–2012.

She was one of 10 women to attend the 1930 meeting of the American Ornithologists' Union, held from October 21–24, at which she presented her groundbreaking work on the nesting behavior of the black-throated blue warbler.

=== Bibliography ===
- Harding, K. C. (1925). "Mockingbird (Mimus polyglottos polyglottos) nesting in Cohasset, Mass.". Auk. 42 (1): 141–142.
- Harding, K. C. (1925). "Semi-colonization of Veeries". Bulletin of the Northeastern Bird Banding Association. 1: 4–7.
- Harding, R. B. & Harding, K. C. (1925). "Juncos with diseased feet". Bulletin of the Northeastern Bird Banding Association. 2 (2): 39–40.
- Harding, K. C. (1926). "Tree Sparrow Returns". Bulletin of the Northeastern Bird Banding Association. 2 (1): 16.
- Harding, R. B. & Harding, K. C. (1926). "White-throats in Cohasset, Massachusetts". Bulletin of the Northeastern Bird Banding Association. 2 (2): 37.
- Harding, K. C. (1926). "A pair of Red-breasted Nuthatches". Bulletin of the Northeastern Bird Banding Association . 2 (1): 16.
- Harding, K. G. [sic] (1927). "A Black-throated Blue Warbler return near Lake Asquam, New Hampshire". Bulletin of the Northeastern Bird Banding Association. 3 (3):7 4–75.
- Harding, K. C. (1927). "A partial record of the nesting of the Kingfisher". Bulletin of the Northeastern Bird Banding Association. 3 (3): 69–70.
- Harding, K. C. (1927). "The protection of ground nests while under observation". Bulletin of the Northeastern Bird Banding Association. 3 (3): 54–55.
- Harding, K. C. (1928). "Purple Finch's nesting ceremony". Bulletin of the Northeastern Bird Banding Association. 4 (3): 108.
- Harding, K. C. (1929). "A White-throated Sparrow Return". Bulletin of the Northeastern Bird Banding Association. 4 (1): 29.
- Harding, K. C. (1929). "Further observations on the Black-throated Blue Warbler". Bulletin of the Northeastern Bird Banding Association. 5 (2): 77–80.
- Harding, K. C. (1929). "Outwitting a Saw-whet Owl". Bulletin of the Northeastern Bird Banding Association. 5 (2): 36.
- Harding, K. C. (1930). "A change in the nesting-habits of the Wood Pewee". Bird-Banding. 1: 144.
- Harding, K. C. (1931). "Nesting habits of the Black-throated Blue Warbler". Auk. 48: 512–522.
- Harding, K. C. (1931). "Cerulean Warbler in Holderness, New Hampshire". Auk. 47: 90.
- Harding, K. C. (1932). "Age record of Black-capped Chickadee". Bird-Banding. 3: 18.
- Harding, Katherine G. [sic] (1942). "A Purple Finch Recovery". Bird-Banding. 13 (3): 121.
- Harding, Katherine G. [sic] (1942). "Unusual Chickadee Returns". Bird-Banding. 13 (3): 121.
- Harding, Katharine C. (1943). "An eight year old Song Sparrow". Bird-Banding. 14 (3): 77.
- Harding, K. C. (1943). "Banding a Scarlet Tanager". Bird-Banding. 14 (3): 76.
- Day, K. C. (1953). "Home life of the Veery". Bird-Banding. 24: 100–106.
