= Camp Ossipee =

Historic summer camp in New Hampshire, United States

- U.S. National Register of Historic Places
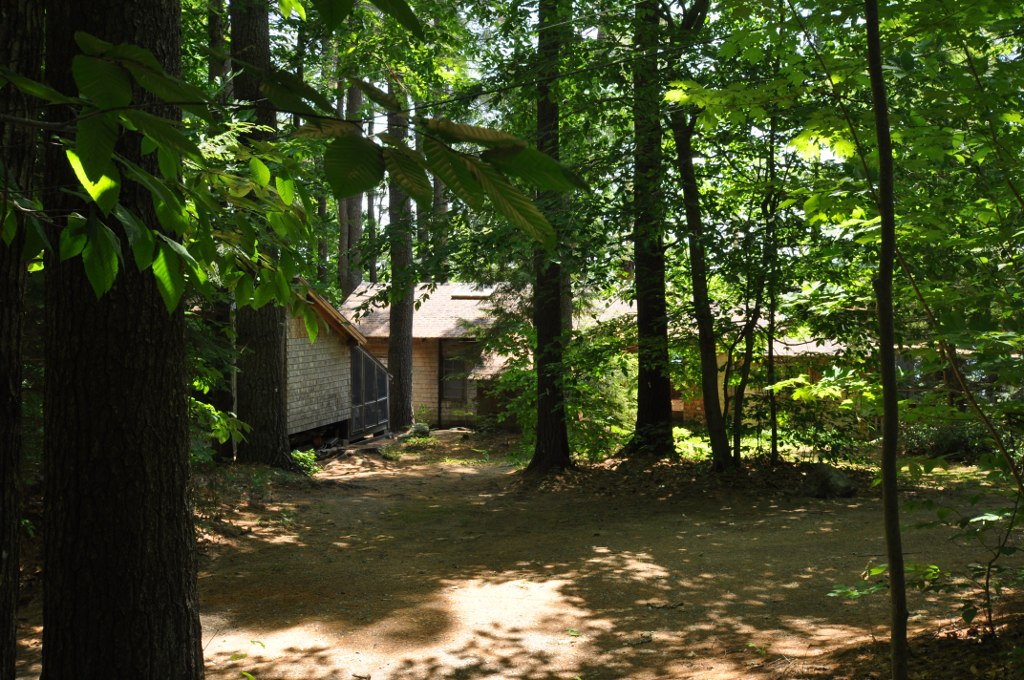
- The Hurd family camp

- Location within New Hampshire Location within the United States
- Location: 11 & 13 Porter Road, Holderness, New Hampshire
- Coordinates: 43°44′39″N 71°32′57″W
- Area: 1.3 acres (0.53 ha)
- Built: c. 1900; 1947
- Architectural style: Summer camp
- MPS: Squam MPS
- NRHP reference No.: 13000154
- Added to NRHP: April 10, 2013

Camp Ossipee is an historic private summer camp in Holderness, New Hampshire. Located on Porter Road on the shores of Squam Lake, it consists of two adjacent family camps owned by the Porter and Hurd families. The older of the two camps was built in 1902, and features an electric railroad to bring supplies to the camp from the road. The camp was listed on the National Register of Historic Places in 2012.

== Description and history ==
Camp Ossipee is located in eastern Holderness, on the south shore of Mooney Point, a peninsula projecting into Squam Lake's west side. It consists of two main camp buildings, four outbuildings, and a short railroad to facilitate the movement of supplies from the access road to the main buildings, which are set down a slope near the water. The older of the two camp buildings is a single-story frame structure, finished in wooden shingles and roughly shaped in a broad V. The water-facing facade is covered by a full-width screened porch which uses slender logs for support. The interior of the building is rustically finished, with a hexagonal living room at its center. The newer of the main buildings is a roughly rectangular single-story frame structure, set further back from the water to the east of the older one.

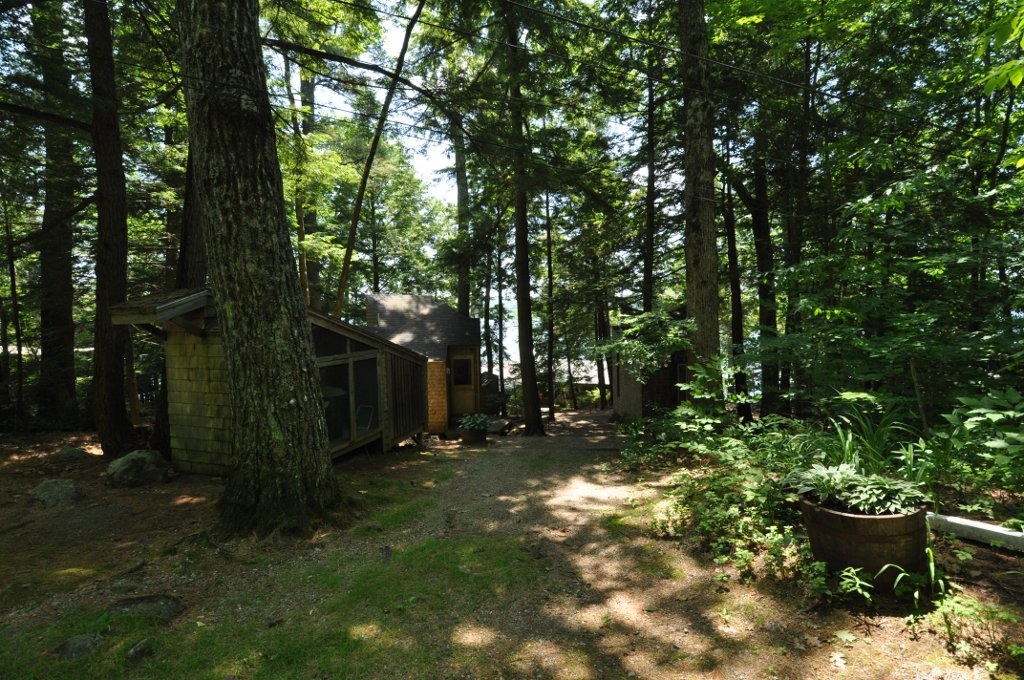
The Porter family camp

Prior to the 1890s, Mooney Point was farmland owned by George Mooney. In 1895 he sold the entire point for use as summer recreation, representing one of the first large-scale conversions of this type in Holderness. Ellen Balch Huntington, the purchaser, established a number of summer camps, probably for use by friends and family. It is believed that Ossipee's oldest structure dates to this period, and was probably informally designed by Huntington. In 1904, the southern part of the point was developed for use as a boys' camp named Camp Aloha. That camp failed in 1934, and the land where Camp Ossipee was purchased by the composer Quincy Porter in 1946. The property remains in the hands of Porter's descendants.

== See also ==
- Watch Rock Camp
- National Register of Historic Places listings in Grafton County, New Hampshire
