= True Farm =

Historic house in New Hampshire, United States

- U.S. National Register of Historic Places
- U.S. Historic district
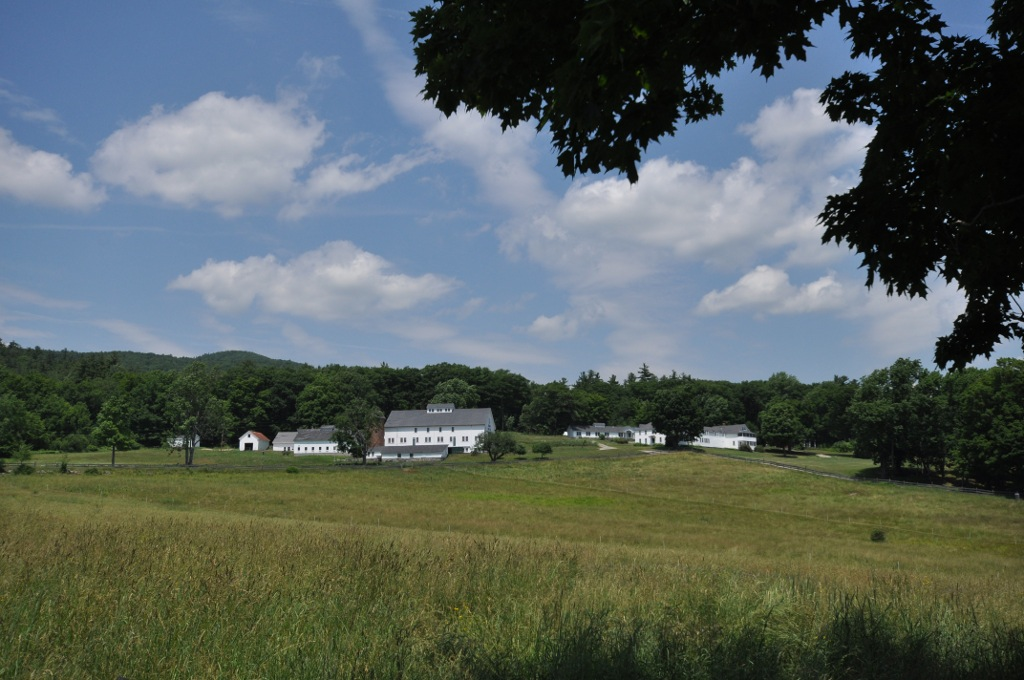

- Location within New Hampshire Location within the United States
- Location: 53, 64, 70 True Farm Rd., & 884 NH 113, Holderness, New Hampshire
- Coordinates: 43°45′46″N 71°33′49″W
- Area: 141 acres (57 ha)
- Architectural style: Federal; Colonial Revival; Summer camp
- MPS: Squam MPS
- NRHP reference No.: 12000507
- Added to NRHP: August 15, 2012

True Farm is a historic farm and summer estate in Holderness, New Hampshire. Located off New Hampshire Route 113 on True Farm Road, the farm is based around a c.1820 farmhouse, and was expanded into a summer estate in 1920 by George Saltonstall West. The 100-acre (40 ha) estate includes numerous outbuildings and a lakefront cottage. The farm was listed on the National Register of Historic Places in 2012.

== Description and history ==
True Farm is located about 4 miles (6 km) northeast of the village center of Holderness, on more than 140 acres (57 ha) of land which is crossed by True Farm Road and New Hampshire Route 113. The property is a mix of woodlands, open fields, and manicured landscapes, and includes residences, farm outbuildings, and estate outbuildings including a bathhouse, playhouse, and springhouse. The main house is a c.1820 farmhouse located among fields south of the True Farm/113 junction. Primarily Federal in its styling, it was given significant Colonial Revival features in the 1920s. A smaller Colonial Revival house, built in the 1920s to house farmhands, lies a short way southwest of the main house. A small cluster of buildings lie screened in woods between Route 113 and Squam Lake.

The farm was operated by a long line of True family members until 1888, when Charles True began leasing part of the farm out for Camp Algonquin, the second summer camp for children on Squam Lake, and also began to take on seasonal boarders at the farm. One of the camp's attendees was George Saltonstall West, who in 1920 purchased the property and began its conversion into a seasonal summer property. The property was operated in part as a working farm, with the Wests shipping its products to their home in Chestnut Hill, Massachusetts. The property was divided among his heirs after George West's death in 1959.

== See also ==
- Webster Estate, located nearby
- National Register of Historic Places listings in Grafton County, New Hampshire
