= Holderness Inn =

- U.S. National Register of Historic Places
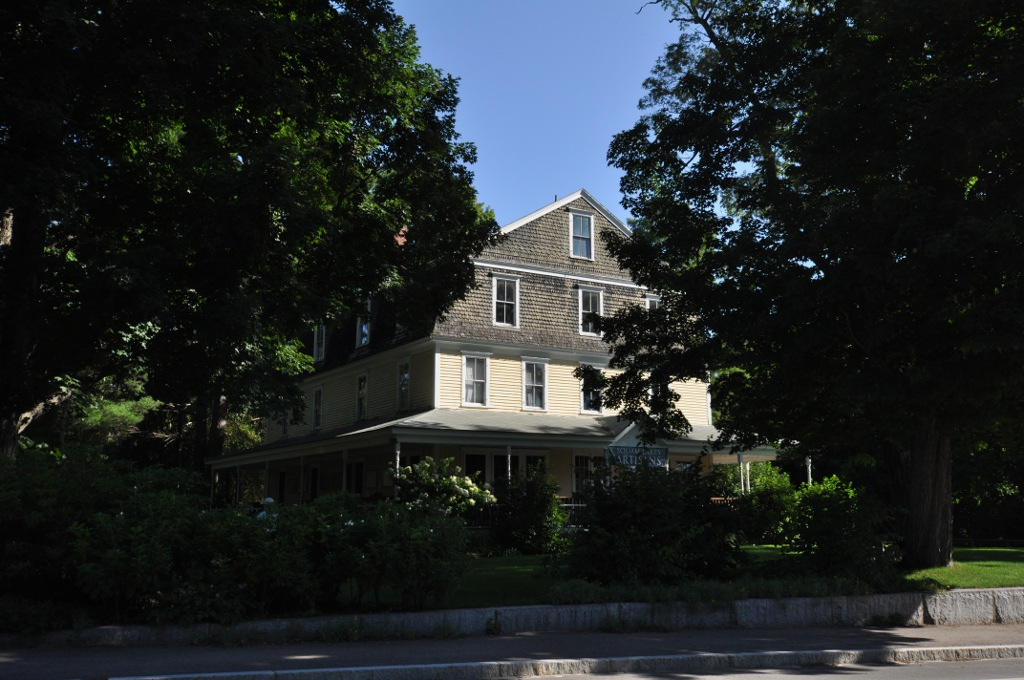

- Location within New Hampshire Location within the United States
- Location: US 3, Holderness, New Hampshire
- Coordinates: 43°43′53″N 71°35′24″W
- Area: 0.8 acres (0.32 ha)
- Built: 1895
- Built by: Davison, John S.
- Architectural style: Late Victorian
- NRHP reference No.: 84000523
- Added to NRHP: December 13, 1984

The Holderness Inn is a former 19th century hotel on United States Route 3 in Holderness, New Hampshire. Built in 1895–96, it is the only such building standing in the Squam Lake area, from a period when there were a significant number of resort hotels around the lake. The building was listed on the National Register of Historic Places in 1984. It is now owned by the Squam Lakes Natural Science Center, and is open seasonally as an art gallery and craft showroom.

== Description and history ==
The former Holderness Inn is on the western fringe of the village center on the north side of US 3. It is a 3 1/2-story wood-frame structure, with a gabled mansard roof and clapboarded exterior. A three-story wing extends northeast from the main block, and is similarly roofed. The north side of the wing has had a two-story shed-roof addition added. The main block has a porch that wraps around three sides. The interior was historically arranged with public spaces (lounge and meeting areas, reception, kitchen, and dining area) on the ground floor, and guest rooms on the upper floors. It retains many original finishes, including plaster and woodwork, despite some modifications for its use by the science center.

The inn was built in 1895-6 by John Davison, whose previous hotel, a converted parsonage, was destroyed by fire. His business's importance to the local economy was underscored by the town's decision to exempt the property from taxation for ten years if he rebuilt, and it set a reward for the capture of the arsonist who is thought to have set the fire. Originally called the Central Inn, it was soon renamed the Holderness Inn. It was operated by the Davison family until 1967, when it was turned over to the science center.

== See also ==
- National Register of Historic Places listings in Grafton County, New Hampshire
