= Boulderwood (Holderness, New Hampshire) =

Historic house in New Hampshire, United States

- U.S. National Register of Historic Places
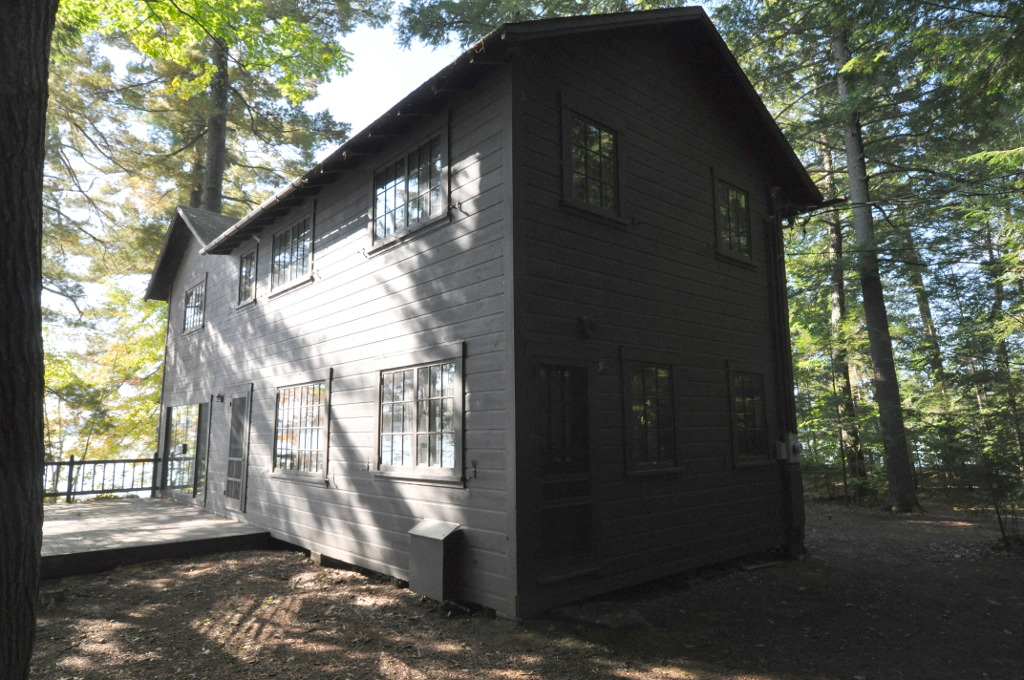

- Location within New Hampshire Location within the United States
- Location: Mooney Point Road, Holderness, New Hampshire
- Coordinates: 43°44′45″N 71°32′43″W
- NRHP reference No.: 100002300
- Added to NRHP: April 9, 2018

Boulderwood is a historic private summer camp on the shore of Squam Lake in Holderness, New Hampshire. Located on Mooney Point, the camp was developed beginning in the 1920s by Elwyn G. Preston. Preston, whose family had summered in other camps located on the point, began purchasing land in 1922, which included 2,000 feet (610 m) of shoreline, which was gradually expanded with other land purchases.

The camp was listed on the National Register of Historic Places in 2018.

== See also ==
- National Register of Historic Places listings in Grafton County, New Hampshire
