= Webster Estate =

Historic house in New Hampshire, United States

- U.S. National Register of Historic Places
- U.S. Historic district
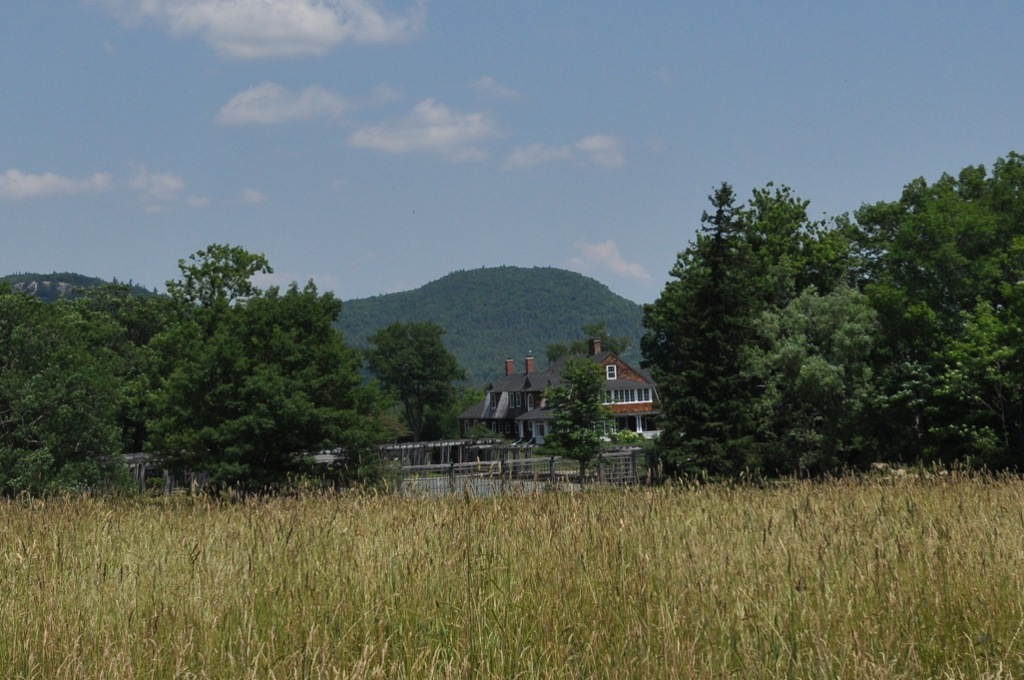
- One of the houses on the Webster Estate

- Location within New Hampshire Location within the United States
- Location: Holderness, New Hampshire
- Coordinates: 43°45′35″N 71°33′31″W
- Area: 16.4 acres (6.6 ha)
- Built: 1886
- Architectural style: Shingle style
- NRHP reference No.: 89000448
- Added to NRHP: June 9, 1989

The Webster Estate is a historic summer estate in Holderness, New Hampshire. Located near Carns Cove on Squam Lake off New Hampshire Route 113, the estate belongs to the locally prominent Webster family. It includes a number of houses: the Homestead, which was built for the family patriarch, Frank Webster, in 1899, and the 1903 Laurence Webster House. It was one of the largest summer estates on Squam Lake at the time. A 16.4-acre (6.6 ha) remnant of the original 5,000-acre (2,000 ha) estate was listed on the National Register of Historic Places in 1989.

== Description and history ==
The Webster Estate is located a few miles northeast of the village center of Holderness, on terrain that slopes southwest of Carns Cove on Squam Lake. The estate is accessed via a series of private or semi-private lanes, including Webster Lane and Burleigh Farm Road. A significant portion of the estate lands are meadow, providing the three houses built for the Webster family expansive views of the lake. The houses are clustered on the hillside well back from Route 113, along with a garage, greenhouse, and formal garden. The Homestead, the estate's original main house, is a two-story gambrel-roofed Shingle-style structure, with a fieldstone foundation and shingled exterior. Its principal public rooms are extended to the outside by covered piazzas. The interior retains original finishes, which are of modest and unpretentious style. The Laurence J. Webster House stands to its west; it is also Shingle style, but has a more elaborate massing than The Homestead.

Frank G. Webster was a prominent financial manager, who for many years had a leading role in the investment firm Kidder, Peabody & Co. He first visited the Squam Lake area in 1881, staying at the Asquam Hotel on Shepard Hill. In 1891, he purchased the farm of Willy Sleep, which became the core holding of the estate, and is where the surviving estate houses now stand. At its height, the estate reached 5,000 acres (2,000 ha), and was one of the largest private landholdings in the state. Webster managed the estate as a timber farm, carefully limiting the harvests. The Homestead is the only significant property associated with Webster's life.

== See also ==
- Camp Carnes
- Burleigh Brae and Webster Boathouse
- National Register of Historic Places listings in Grafton County, New Hampshire
