= Natalia Raigorodsky =

Marie Leda Natalia Raigorodsky Heimsath Harter Parris
- Born: Marie Leda Natalia Raigorodsky; 28 July 1929; Tulsa, Oklahoma, United States
- Died: 28 August 2018 (aged 89)
- Other name: Natalia Raigorodsky
- Education: Barnard College; American University
- Occupations: Composer, educator, Music critic
- Spouse(s): Charles Herman Heimsath; James L. Parris

Marie Leda Natalia Raigorodsky Heimsath Harter Parris (28 July 1929 - 28 August 2018) was an American composer, educator, and music critic who produced over 150 works, including two operas and two symponies. She published under the name Natalia Raigorodsky.

== Biography ==
Raigorodsky was born in Tulsa, Oklahoma, to Ethel McCaleb and Paul M. Raigorodsky. She grew up in Texas, then moved to Maine in the early 1940s. She graduated from Barnard College in 1952 and earned a master's degree in composition and music history in 1963 from American University. Raigorodsky studied privately at Yale University and the Juilliard School of Music. Her teachers included Stanley Hummel, Quincy Porter, Gordon H. Smith, and Bernard Wagenaar. She taught music theory and piano privately throughout her life.

Raigorodsky married Charles Herman Heimsath and had two sons. In 1987, she married James L. Parris.

From 1962 to 1966, Raigorodsky lived in Washington, D.C. where she programmed classical music for radio programs and worked as an announcer and interviewer, as well as a music critic. A longtime member of the First Church of Christ, Scientist, she wrote organ chorale settings for several hymns, and set religious texts to music. She also belonged to Mu Phi Epsilon.

By 1978, Raigorodsky was living in Muncy Valley, Pennsylvania, where she became involved with restoring and preserving the Keystone Mountain Park Trust. In 1982, her opera The Promise of Peace was premiered by the Opera Theatre of Washington D.C., which later performed The White Cliffs as well.

Some of Raigorodsky’s compositions were self-published. Others were published by Culley Music and Wings of the Morning Music. Many of her works are archived at the Library of Congress. Her compositions include:

== Chamber ==
- Dusk (flute and piano)
- Introduction, Reflection and Allegro (woodwind quintet)

== Opera ==
- The Promise of Peace
- The White Cliffs (text by Alice Duer Miller)

== Orchestra ==
- Symphony No. 1 (also arranged for flute, harp and bassoon)
- Symphony No. 2

== Organ ==
- Light of Love: Seven Organ Chorales from the Christian Science Hymnal

== Piano ==
- Preludes

== Vocal ==
- “A Sound I’ve Heard” (text by Evelyn Grover Heiss)
- “Christmas Love”
- “Lord’s Prayer”
- “Love’s Promise“
- “O Thou Unchanging Truth” (text by Peter J. Henniker-Heaton)
- Open Windows: Five Musical Settings of Poems of Spiritual Inspirations
- “Psalm of Thanksgiving”
- Psalms 21, 23, 27, 100, 121
- She Lies Asleep, Requiem (chorus, horn and piano)
- “Thanksgiving”
- “Wake Ye People and Sing”
