= Quincy Porter =

American composer

Quincy Porter

William Quincy Porter (February 7, 1897 – November 12, 1966) was an American composer and teacher of classical music.

== Biography ==
Born in New Haven, Connecticut, he went to Yale University where his teachers included Horatio Parker and David Stanley Smith. Porter received two awards while studying music at Yale: the Osborne Prize for Fugue, and the Steinert Prize for orchestral composition. He performed the winning composition, a violin concerto, at graduation. Porter earned two degrees at Yale, an A.B. from Yale College and a Mus. B from the music school.

After graduation, he spent a year in Paris, studying at Schola Cantorum, then went to New York where he studied with Ernest Bloch and Vincent d'Indy. In 1923 Porter joined the faculty of the Cleveland Institute of Music where he was later appointed head of the Theory Department. He remained there until 1928 when he resigned to focus on composition. Returning to Paris on a Guggenheim Fellowship Porter began composing in earnest. During his 3 years in Paris, he composed Blues Lointains (1928), the Suite for Viola Alone (1930), his 3rd String Quartet (1930), 4th String Quartet (1931), his 2nd Violin Sonata (1929), and his Piano Sonata (1930). During the first trip, his daughter, Helen, was born.

In 1931 Porter returned to the United States, first rejoining the faculty at the Cleveland Institute of Music, then teaching at Vassar, where he was appointed a professor in 1932. In 1954, Porter's 1953 Concerto Concertante, a concerto for two pianos and orchestra, was awarded the Pulitzer Prize for Music. Music historian Nicholas Tawa calls the piece, "affectively compelling, orchestrally luminous, and contrapuntally active"; cooperative rather than competitive. In 1938 later Porter became dean (1938–42) and then director (1942–46) of the New England Conservatory of Music, and in 1946 returned to Yale, as professor, to teach until 1965. His students there included Natalia Raigorodsky. Porter also served, from 1958 until his death, as chairman of the board of directors of the American Music Center, which he had founded with Howard Hanson and Aaron Copland in 1939. He died in Bethany, Connecticut.

He wrote a substantial amount in the "absolute (established) forms", including nine string quartets (1923–1953), several concertos (including one for harpsichord, one for viola, and one for two pianos, the latter work receiving the 1954 Pulitzer Prize for Music), and two symphonies. His later music—while tonal—is harmonically acerbic and dissonant. His work was also part of the music event in the art competition at the 1936 Summer Olympics.

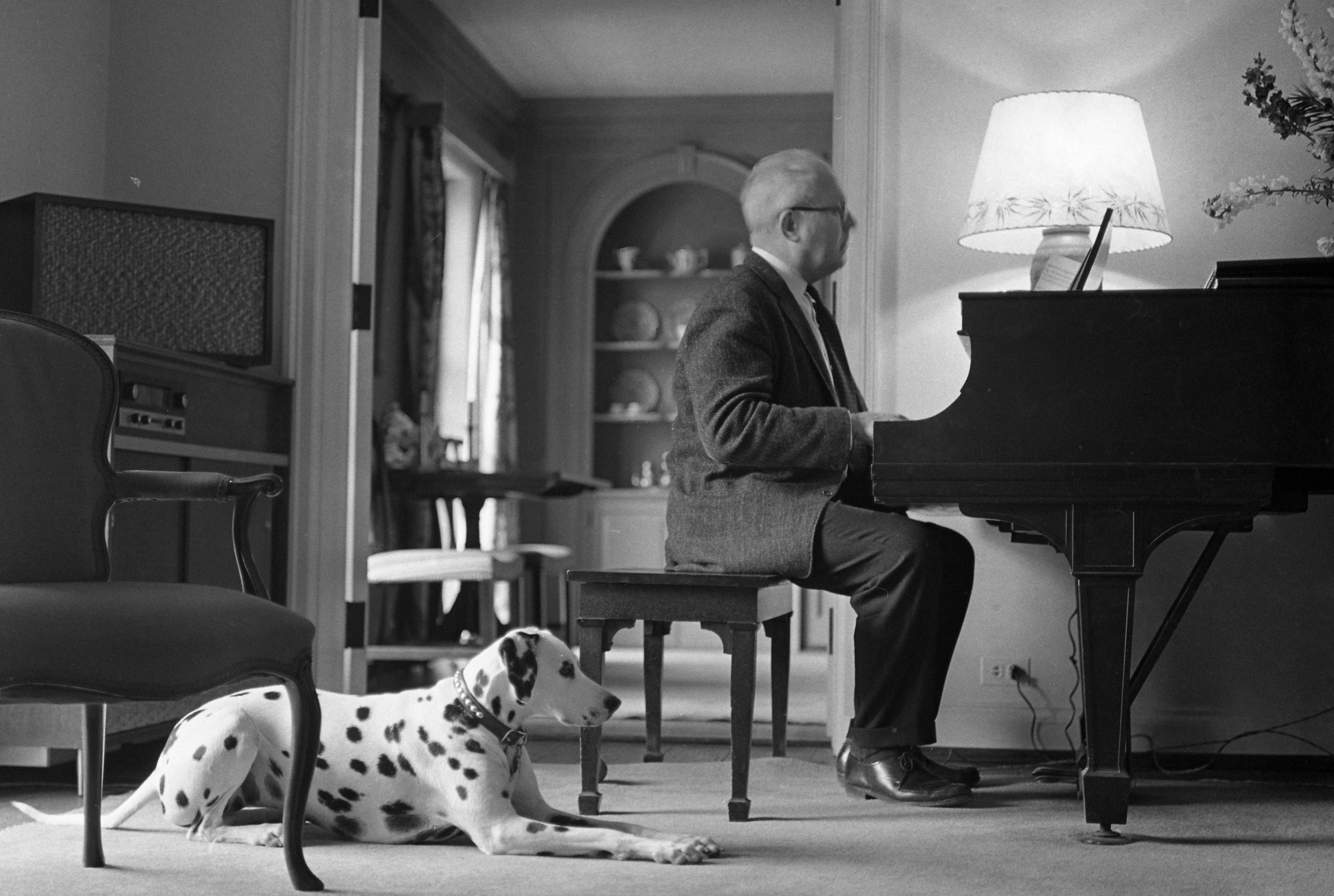
Quincy Porter at Pierson College 1961

== Selected works ==
- Symphonies
  - Symphony no. 1, 1934
  - Symphony no. 2, 1962
- Other orchestral
  - Ukrainian Suite, 1925
  - Poem and Dance, 1932
  - Dance in Three-Time, 1937
  - Music for Strings, 1941
  - New England Episodes, 1958
- Concertos
  - Concerto Concertante, for two pianos and orchestra, 1953
  - Harpsichord Concerto, 1959
  - Viola Concerto, 1948
  - Fantasy on a Pastoral Theme for organ and strings, 1943
  - Concerto for Wind Orchestra, 1959
- Chamber music
  - Nine string quartets from 1922 to 1923 (no. 1 in E minor), 1925, 1930, 1931, 1935, 1937, 1943, 1950, 1958
  - Piano Quintet, 1927
  - Quintet for harpsichord and strings, 1961
  - Oboe quintet (Elegiac), 1966
  - Little Trio (Suite in E Major) for flute, violin, and viola, 1928
  - Clarinet quintet, 1929
  - Two violin sonatas (1926, 1929; second recorded in the 1950s and more recently, 1st given its premiere recording in the late 1990s) (also an early sonata from 1919 has been recorded)
  - Suite for viola alone, 1930
  - Piano Sonata (1930)
  - Sonata for horn and piano, 1946
  - Sextet on a Slavic Folk-Theme, 1947
  - Blues Lointains for flute and piano (1928)

== Books ==
- Porter, Quincy. A Study of Sixteenth Century Counterpoint; Based on the Works of Orlando di Lasso. Boston: Loomis. 3rd ed. 1948.
- Porter, Quincy. A Study of Fugue Writing; Based on Bach's Well-tempered Clavichord. Boston: Loomis. 1951.

== See also ==
- Camp Ossipee, Porter's summer camp in Holderness, New Hampshire
