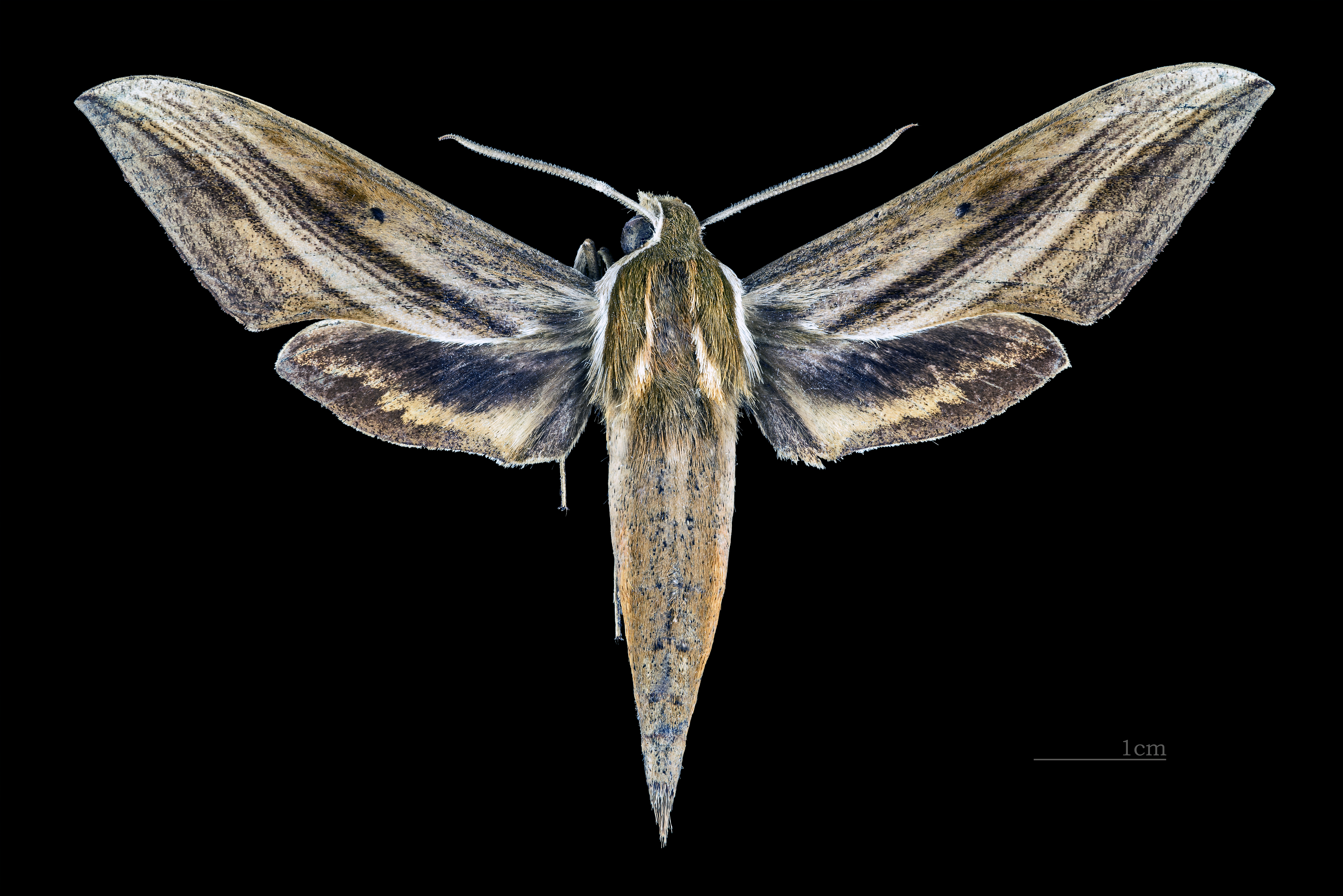
- Xylophanes josephinae male dorsal MHNT
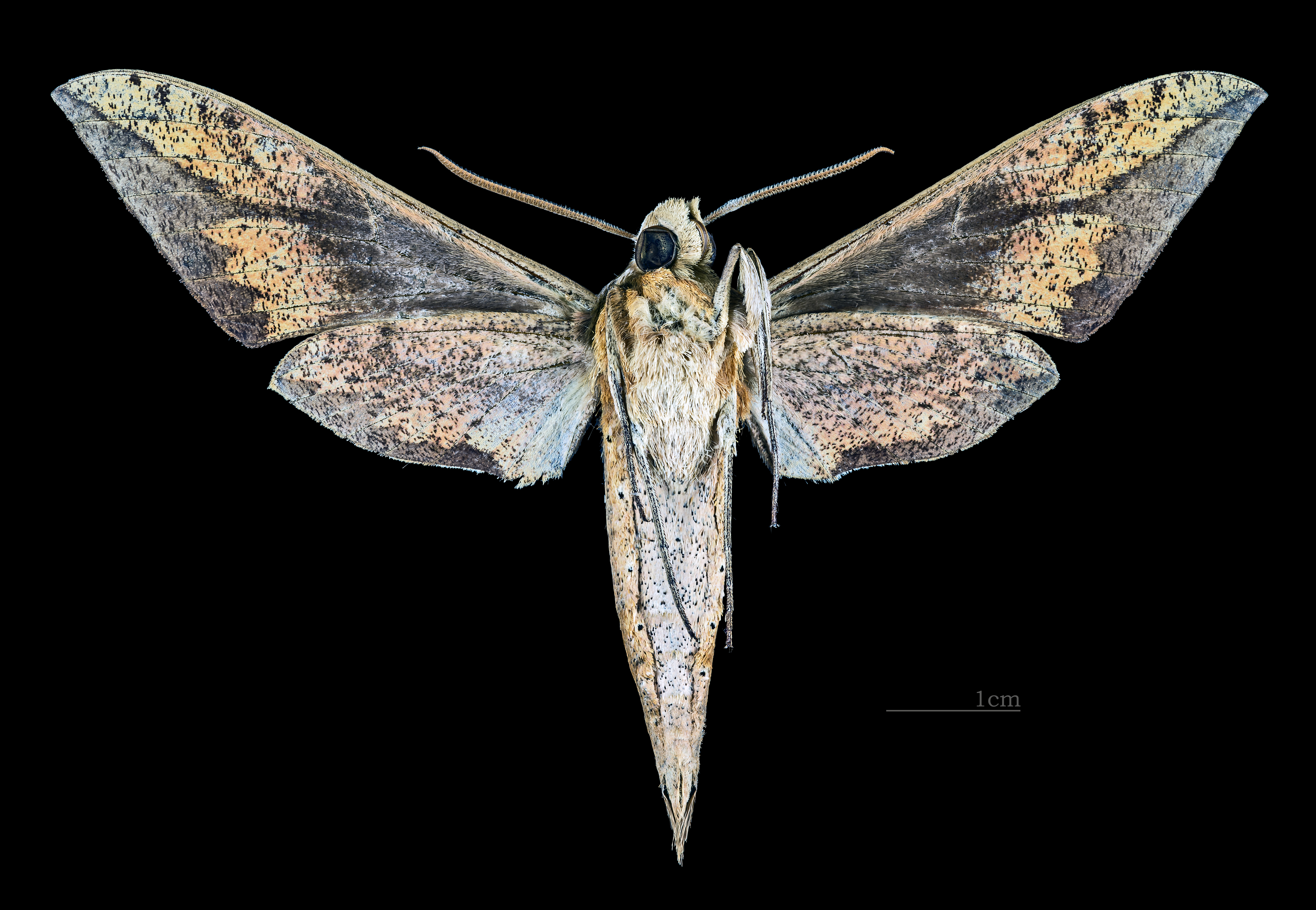
- Xylophanes josephinae male ventral MHNT

Scientific classification
- Domain: Eukaryota
- Kingdom: Animalia
- Phylum: Arthropoda
- Class: Insecta
- Order: Lepidoptera
- Family: Sphingidae
- Genus: Xylophanes
- Species: X. josephinae

Binomial name
- Xylophanes josephinae Clark, 1920

Synonyms
- Xylophanes cantel Schaus, 1941

= Xylophanes josephinae =

Species of moth

Xylophanes josephinae is a moth of the family Sphingidae. It is known from Guatemala and Mexico.

The wingspan is 40–42 mm. It is similar to Xylophanes damocrita but larger, the forewings are more elongate, making the outer margin appear almost straight, the hindwings are longer (the apex clearly exceeding the forewing tornus). The forewing upperside is also similar but the pale median area of the basal half of the wing is less extensive, not crossing the basal parts of the first three postmedian lines and thus not linking with the pale line between the third and fourth postmedian lines. Furthermore, the dark dashes distal to discal spot are less clear and the postmedian and submarginal lines are straighter. The median band of the hindwing upperside is well developed only at the start, but rapidly disappearing towards the apex.

Adults are probably on wing year-round.

The larvae possibly feed on Psychotria panamensis, Psychotria nervosa and Pavonia guanacastensis.
