= John Myers (photographer) =

British artist

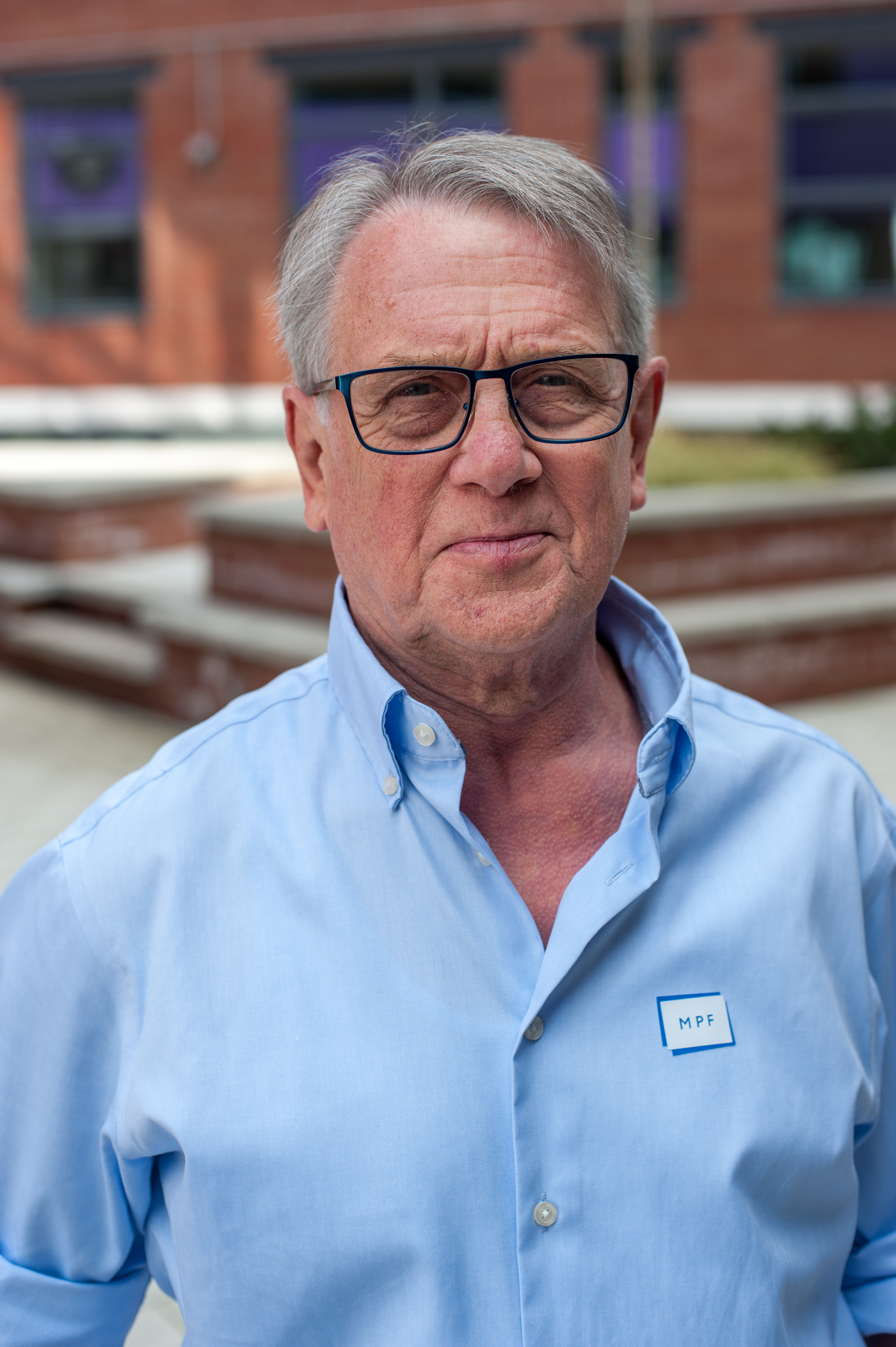
Myers in 2018

John Myers (born 1944) is a British landscape and portrait photographer and painter. Between 1973 and 1981 he photographed mundane aspects of middle class life in the centre of England—black and white portraits of ordinary people and suburbia within walking distance of his home in Stourbridge.

Myers self-published this photography in books in 1974 and 1990; then only after renewed critical attention in 2011 were more books dedicated solely to his photography published. His work was included in the international survey of photographers, The Photography Book (Phaidon Press, 2014). Since the early 1970s he has exhibited in the UK and Europe. His work is held in the collection of the Library of Birmingham, in the Arts Council Collection, and in the James Hyman Collection.

He later gave up photography for painting and had a solo exhibition in 2003 at Rugby Art Gallery and Museum.

Myers worked as a lecturer in fine art, then painting, from 1969 to 2001.

== Life and work ==
Originally from Bradford, Myers has been based in the Black Country town of Stourbridge, in the West Midlands, since graduating from art school in Newcastle in 1969.

His photographs between 1972 and 1979 were all made within walking distance of his home, mostly of people and places that he knew. His self-published book from this period, Middle England (1974), contains black and white portraits of individuals and families, which were also included in his first major exhibition at Ikon Gallery, Birmingham, in 2012. His black and white photographs of "garages, TVs, electricity substations, new builds and his neighbours" in The World is not Beautiful: 1973–1981 (published 2017) were also made within walking distance of his house. He has also extensively photographed British industry.

Myers used a 4×5 large format Gandolfi camera that takes some time to set up and to use. He has noted the influence of photographers August Sander, Lewis Hine, Walker Evans, Eugene Atget, and Diane Arbus.

His photographic archive from 1972 to 1981 is held in the Library of Birmingham's photography collection. The archive contains 134 of his portraits, mainly from 1973 to 1975; and roughly 160 photographs of aspects of the urban environment, from 1974 to 1981.

Although his work is thoroughly English in feel, Myers was a contemporary of, and can be favourably compared to, American Landscape photographers including Stephen Shore, Lewis Baltz & Robert Adam[s]. Closely echoing minimalist sculpture, Myers' imagery pares landscape back to its most minimal, presenting environments, objects and buildings, which marginalise or exclude human presence and offer clear stylistic affinities with the work of Carl Andre[,] Dan Flavin, Donald Judd and Sol LeWitt. In addition to the photographs' conceptual purity, they also represent a remarkable and nostalgic panorama of Britain in the early 1970s.

In 1976 Myers self-published a book and co-curated an exhibition of photographs by Harold Eugene Edgerton (1903–1990). Edgerton was the inventor of single and multi-flash stroboscopic photography and this was the first solo exhibition in Europe of his work.

Myers gave up photography for painting.

He worked as senior lecturer in fine art at Stourbridge College of Art from 1969 to 1989; then senior lecturer in painting, and head of the MA in painting, at the University of Wolverhampton from 1989 to 2001.

== Publications ==
=== Publications by Myers ===
- Middle England: Twenty Four Photographs. Self-published, 1974. OCLC 228036416. With a preface by Paul David Lewis.
- Seeing the Unseen, the High Speed Photography of Dr. Harold E. Edgerton. Self-published, 1976. Photographs by Harold Eugene Edgerton.
- The Dudley Experience, De-Industrialisation, Unemployment and Enterprise in Dudley M.B.C. 1979–1983. Self-published, 1990.
- John Myers: Middle England. Birmingham: Ikon, 2011. ISBN 978-1904864721. With an introduction by Jonathan Watkins and Pete James, and essays by Paul David Lewis, Eugenie Shinkle and Ian Jeffrey. Exhibition catalogue.
- The World is not Beautiful: 1973–1981. Hatfield, Hertfordshire: University of Hertfordshire Galleries; Manchester: Cornerhouse, 2017. Edited by Matthew Shaul and Steven Adams. ISBN 978-0-9935912-2-8. Exhibition catalogue.
- The Portraits. Bristol: RRB, 2018. ISBN 9781999727512. Edition of 458 copies.
- Looking At The Overlooked. Bristol: RRB, 2018. ISBN 978-1-9997275-3-6. Edition of 458 copies.
- The End of Industry. Bristol: RRB, 2019. Edition of 500 copies.
- The Guide. Bristol: RRB, 2021. ISBN 9781916057579. Includes work from The Portraits, Looking At The Overlooked, and The End of Industry plus 5 previously unpublished images. With writing by Myers. Edition of 800 copies.
- Life As It Is. Bristol: RRB, 2022.

=== Zine by Myers ===
- The End of Manufacturing. Southport: Café Royal, 2017. Edition of 350 copies.

=== Publications with contributions by Myers ===
- Serpentine Photography 73: The Arts Council presents work by 43 young photographers. London: Arts Council of Great Britain, 1973. ISBN 978-0900085949. 45 cards (90 sides) in an envelope.
- British Image 1. London: Arts Council of Great Britain, 1975. ISBN 978-0728700352. Photographs by Homer Sykes, Claire Schwob, Myers, Daniel Meadows, Bryn Campbell, Roslyn Banish, Ian Dobbie, and Paul Carter; with a very brief introduction by Robin Campbell and Barry Lane. Pages 28 to 37 present "Middle England" by Myers, introduced by an essay on the work by Paul David Lewis.
- About 70 Photographs. London: Arts Council of Great Britain, 1980. Edited by Chris Steel-Perkins and William Messer. ISBN 0-7287-0208-8 (paperback); ISBN 0-7287-0209-6 (hardback). Steele-Perkins and Messer comment on Young Boy (1975) on pp 12–13.
- Approaching Photography. Focal Press, 1982. By Paul Hill. ISBN 9780240511450.
- Unpopular Culture: Grayson Perry Selects from the Arts Council Collection. Edited by Grayson Perry. London: Hayward, 2008. ISBN 9781853322679.
- The Photography Book. Second, revised edition. Phaidon, 2014. ISBN 978-0714867380.

== Photography exhibitions ==
=== Solo exhibitions ===
- John Myers 33 portraits, 14 boring photographs, 10 televisions, 8 sub stations, 6 houses, 3 furniture stores and one giraffe, Gallery of Photography, Dublin, February–March 2014.
- John Myers: The World is Not Beautiful – it is There, Art and Design Gallery, University of Hertfordshire, Hatfield, December 2016 – January 2017; The Gateway Gallery, Luton Culture, Luton, February–April 2017.

=== Group exhibitions ===
- Serpentine Photography 73, Arts Council, Serpentine Gallery, London, July–August 1973.
- Unpopular Culture, De La Warr Pavilion, Bexhill-on-Sea, May–July 2008; Harris Museum and Art Gallery, Preston, July–September 2008; DLI Museum and Art Gallery, Durham, November 2008 – January 2009; Southampton City Art Gallery, January–March 2009; Aberystwyth Arts Centre, March–May 2009; Scarborough Art Gallery, May–July 2009; Longside Gallery, Wakefield, July–October 2009; Victoria Art Gallery, Bath, November 2009 – January 2010. Artworks from the Arts Council Collection curated by Grayson Perry.
- Distinctly, Pingyao International Photography Festival, Pingyao, China, September 2018.

=== Exhibitions curated by Myers ===
- Seeing the Unseen: The High Speed Photography of Dr. Harold Edgerton, Ikon Gallery, Birmingham, January 1976; then toured to The Photographers' Gallery, London; Hatton Gallery, Newcastle University; Midland Group Gallery, Nottingham; Modern Art Oxford; and Arnolfini, Bristol. Curated by Myers and Geoffrey Holt.
- Seeing the Unseen: Photographs and films by Harold E. Edgerton, The Pallasades Shopping Centre, Birmingham, July–September 2010. A repeat organised by Ikon Gallery of the previous exhibition.

== Solo painting exhibition ==
- Here's One I Made Earlier, Rugby Art Gallery and Museum, Rugby, April–May 2003

== Collections ==
Myers' work is held in the following collections:

- Arts Council Collection, UK: 8 prints
- James Hyman Collection, UK
- Library of Birmingham, Birmingham, UK: roughly 300 prints

== Award ==
- 1974: Arts Council England publishing award, to produce Middle England
