= Harold Edgerton =

American engineer and inventor (1903-1990)

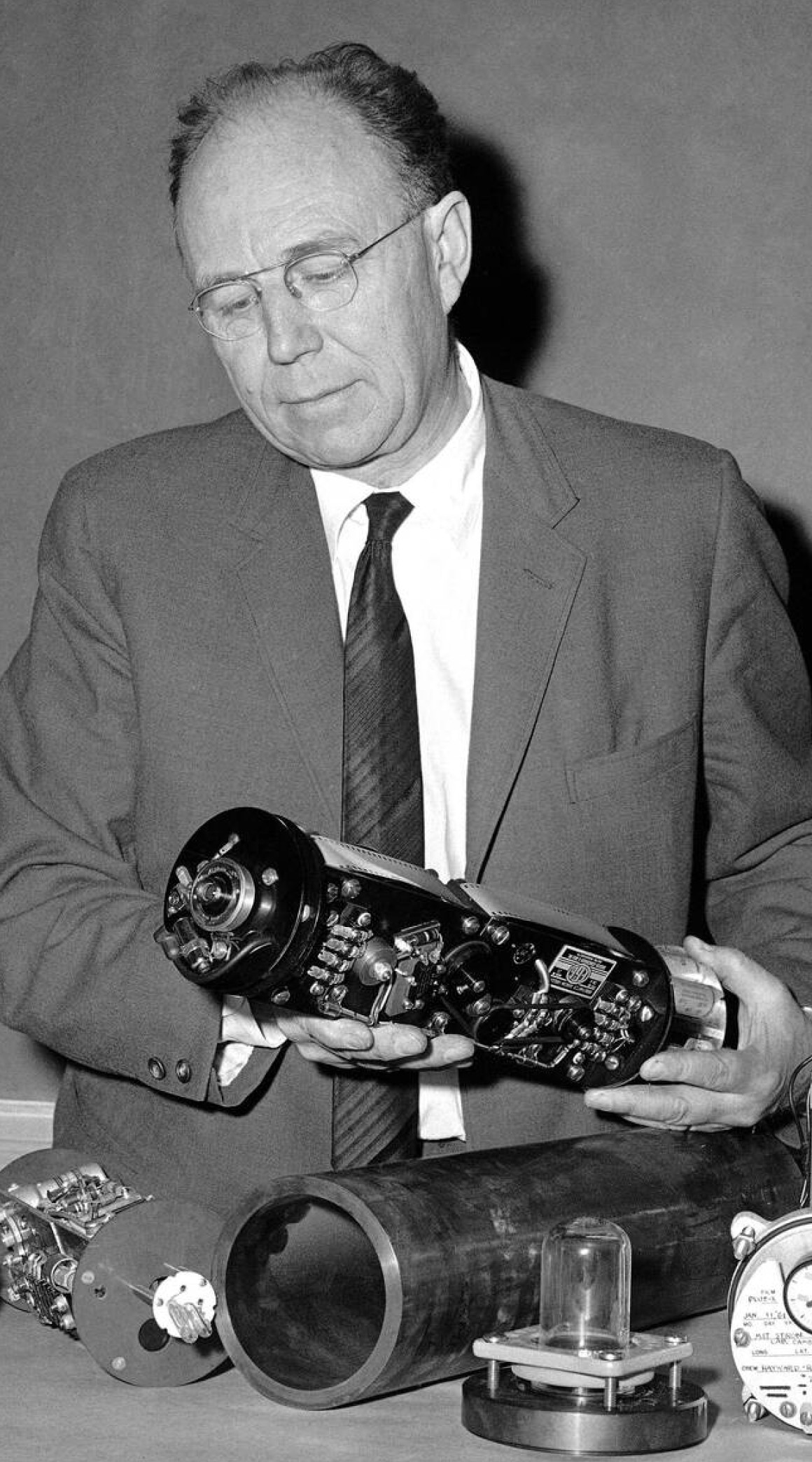
- Edgerton in 1963
- Born: Harold Eugene Edgerton; April 6, 1903; Fremont, Nebraska
- Died: January 4, 1990 (aged 86); Cambridge, Massachusetts
- Other names: 'Doc' Edgerton, Papa Flash
- Education: University of Nebraska (BS, Electrical Engineering, 1925); Massachusetts Institute of Technology (MS, Electrical Engineering, 1927; ScD, Electrical Engineering, 1931)
- Known for: Stroboscope
- Awards: SPIE Gold Medal (1981)
- Scientific career
- Fields: Engineering/photography
- Workplaces: Massachusetts Institute of Technology

Harold Eugene Edgerton (April 6, 1903 – January 4, 1990), also known as Papa Flash, was an American scientist and researcher, a professor of electrical engineering at the Massachusetts Institute of Technology. He is largely credited with transforming the stroboscope from an obscure laboratory instrument into a common device. He also was deeply involved with the development of sonar and deep-sea photography, and his equipment was used in collaboration with Jacques Cousteau in searches for shipwrecks and even the Loch Ness Monster.

== Biography ==
=== Early years ===
Edgerton was born in Fremont, Nebraska, on April 6, 1903, the son of Mary Nettie Coe and Frank Eugene Edgerton, a descendant of Samuel Edgerton, the son of Richard Edgerton, one of the founders of Norwich, Connecticut, and Alice Ripley, a great-granddaughter of Governor William Bradford (1590–1657) of the Plymouth Colony and a passenger on the Mayflower. His father was a lawyer, journalist, author and orator and served as the assistant attorney general of Nebraska from 1911 to 1915. Edgerton grew up in Aurora, Nebraska. He also spent some of his childhood years in Washington, DC, and Lincoln, Nebraska.

=== Education ===
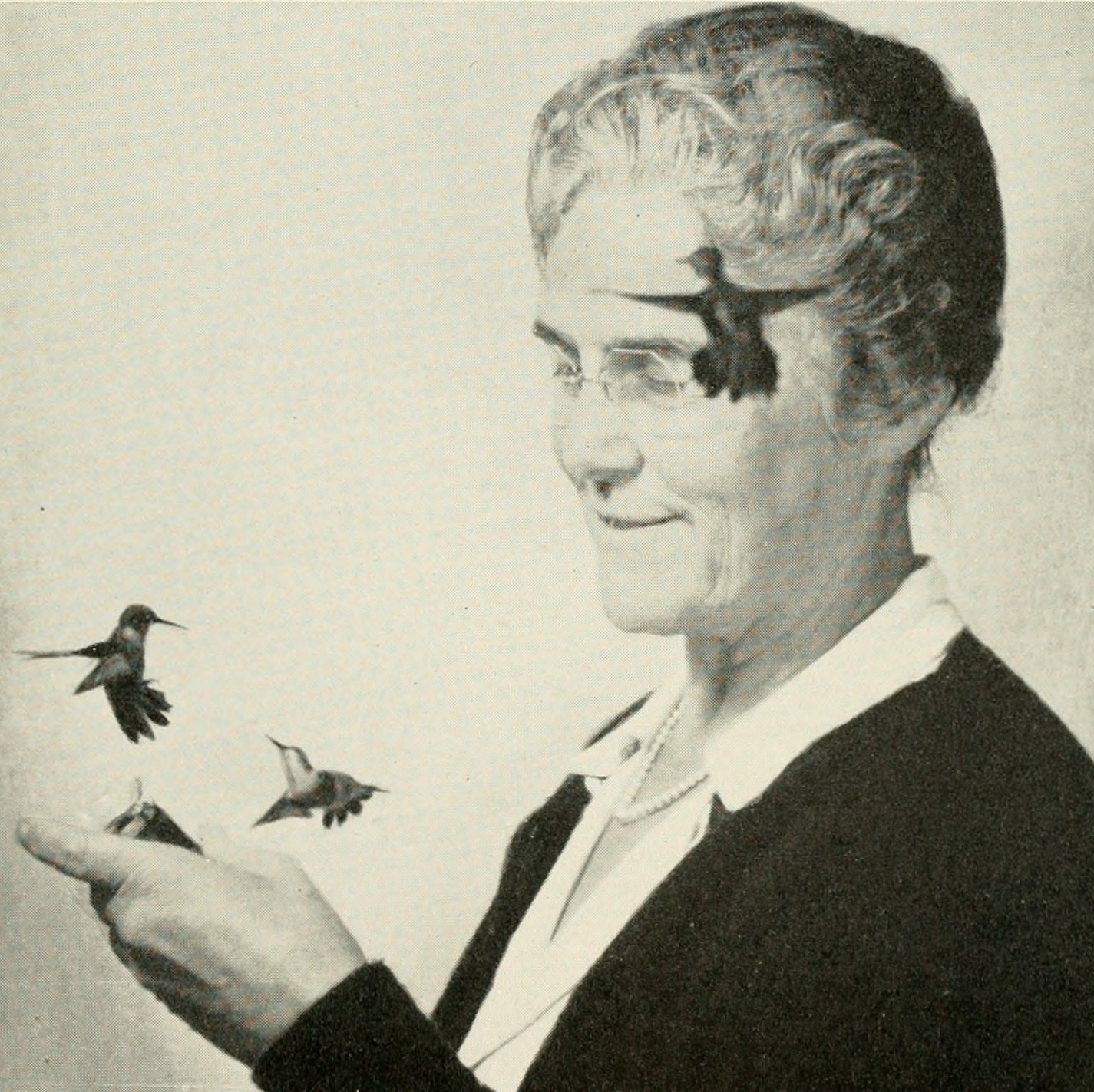
A 1936 picture of May Rogers Webster with hummingbirds

In 1925 Edgerton received a bachelor's degree in electrical engineering from the University of Nebraska where he became a member of Acacia fraternity. He earned an SM in electrical engineering from MIT in 1927. Edgerton used stroboscopes to study synchronous motors for his ScD thesis in electrical engineering at MIT, awarded in 1931. He credited Charles Stark Draper with inspiring him to photograph everyday objects using electronic flash; the first was a stream of water from a faucet.

In 1936 Edgerton visited hummingbird expert May Rogers Webster. He was able to illustrate with her help that it was possible to take photographs of the birds beating their wings 60 times a second using an exposure of one hundred thousandth of a second. A picture of her with the birds flying around her appeared in National Geographic.

=== Career ===
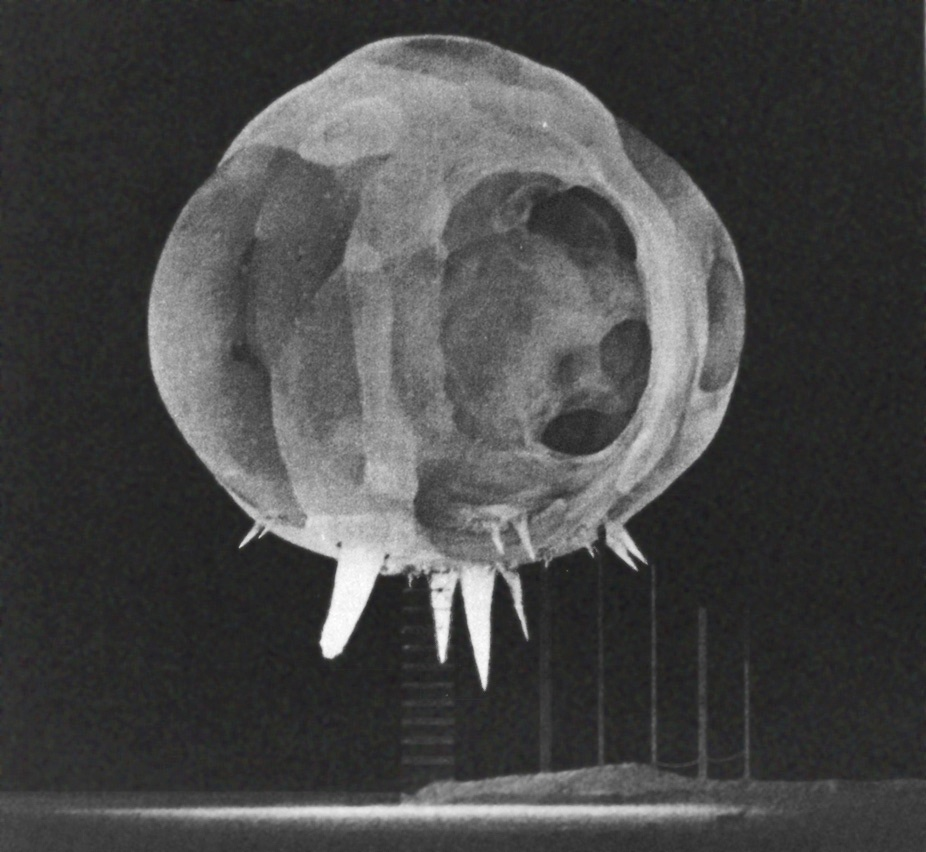
Nuclear explosion captured by Edgerton's Rapatronic camera

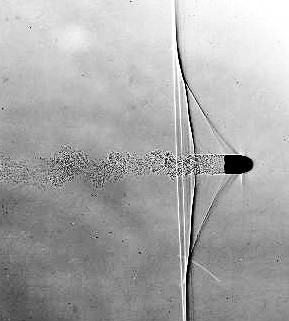
Shadowgraph of bullet in flight using Edgerton's equipment and stroboscope

In 1937 Edgerton began a lifelong association with photographer Gjon Mili, who used stroboscopic equipment, in particular, multiple studio electronic flash units, to produce photographs, many of which appeared in Life magazine. When taking multiflash photographs this strobe light equipment could flash up to 120 times a second. Edgerton was a pioneer in using short duration electronic flash in photographing fast events photography, subsequently using the technique to capture images of balloons at different stages of their bursting, a bullet during its impact with an apple, or using multiflash to track the motion of a devil stick, for example.

He was awarded a bronze medal by the Royal Photographic Society in 1934, the Howard N. Potts Medal from the Franklin Institute in 1941, the Golden Plate Award of the American Academy of Achievement in 1966, the David Richardson Medal by the Optical Society of America in 1968, the Albert A. Michelson Medal from the same Franklin Institute in 1969, and the National Medal of Science in 1973.

Edgerton partnered with Kenneth J. Germeshausen to do consulting for industrial clients. Later Herbert Grier joined them. The company name "Edgerton, Germeshausen, and Grier" was changed to EG&G in 1947. EG&G became a prime contractor for the Atomic Energy Commission and had a major role in photographing and recording nuclear tests for the US through the fifties and sixties. For this role Edgerton and Charles Wykoff and others at EG&G developed and manufactured the Rapatronic camera.

His work was instrumental in the development of side-scan sonar technology, used to scan the sea floor for wrecks. Edgerton worked with undersea explorer Jacques Cousteau, by first providing him with custom-designed underwater photographic equipment featuring electronic flash, and then by developing sonar techniques used to discover the Britannic. Edgerton participated in the discovery of the American Civil War battleship USS Monitor. While working with Cousteau, he acquired the nickname "Papa Flash". In 1988 Doc Edgerton worked with Paul Kronfield in Greece on a sonar search for the lost city of Helike, believed to be the basis for the legend of Atlantis.

Edgerton co-founded EG&G, Inc., which manufactured advanced electronic equipment including side-scan sonars and sub-bottom profiling equipment. EG&G also invented and manufactured the Krytron, the detonation trigger for the hydrogen bomb, and an EG&G division supervised many of America's nuclear tests.

In addition to having the scientific and engineering acumen to perfect strobe lighting commercially, Edgerton is equally recognized for his visual aesthetic: many of the striking images he created in illuminating phenomena that occurred too fast for the naked eye now adorn art museums worldwide. In 1940, his high speed stroboscopic short film Quicker'n a Wink won an Oscar.

Edgerton was appointed a professor of electrical engineering at the Massachusetts Institute of Technology (MIT) in 1934. At MIT Edgerton created a technology lab nicknamed Strobe Alley, considered by author Pagan Kennedy as a forerunner of the Hackerspace. This lab and its encouragement of tinkering and invention influenced the careers of MIT students such as Martin Klein, who contributed to the development of side scan sonar.

In 1956, Edgerton was elected a Fellow of the American Academy of Arts and Sciences. He became a member of the United States National Academy of Sciences in 1964 and a member of the American Philosophical Society in 1972. He was especially loved by MIT students for his willingness to teach and his kindness: "The trick to education", he said, "is to teach people in such a way that they don't realize they're learning until it's too late". His last undergraduate class, taught during fall semester 1977, was a freshman seminar titled "Bird and Insect Photography". One of the graduate student dormitories at MIT carries his name.

In 1962, Edgerton appeared on I've Got a Secret, where he demonstrated strobe flash photography by shooting a bullet into a playing card and photographing the result.

Edgerton's work was featured in an October 1987 National Geographic Magazine article entitled "Doc Edgerton: the man who made time stand still".

=== Family ===
After graduating from the University of Nebraska, Edgerton married Esther May Garrett in 1928. She was born in Aurora, Nebraska, on September 8, 1903, and died on March 9, 2002, in Charleston, South Carolina. She received a bachelor's degree in mathematics, music and education from the University of Nebraska. A skilled pianist and singer, she attended the New England Conservatory of Music and taught in public schools in Aurora, Nebraska and Boston. During their marriage they had three children: Mary Louise (April 21, 1931), William Eugene (8/9/1933), Robert Frank (5/10/1935). His sister, Mary Ellen Edgerton, was the wife of L. Welch Pogue (1899–2003) a pioneering aviation attorney and chairman of the old Civil Aeronautics Board. The technology writer, journalist, and commentator David Pogue is his great nephew.

=== Death ===
Edgerton remained active throughout his later years, and was seen on the MIT campus many times after his official retirement. He died suddenly on January 4, 1990, at the MIT Faculty Club at the age of 86, and is buried in Mount Auburn Cemetery, Cambridge, Massachusetts.

== Legacy ==
On July 3, 1990, in an effort to memorialize Edgerton's accomplishments, several community members in Aurora, Nebraska, decided to construct a "Hands-On" science center. It was designated as a "teaching museum", that would preserve Doc's work and artifacts, as well as feature the "Explorit Zone" where people of all ages could participate in hands-on exhibits and interact with live science demonstrations. After five years of private and community-wide fund-raising, as well as individual investments by Doc's surviving family members, the Edgerton Explorit Center was officially dedicated on September 9, 1995, in Aurora.

At MIT, the Edgerton Center, founded in 1992, is a hands-on laboratory resource for undergraduate and graduate students, and also conducts educational outreach programs for high school students and teachers.

== Works ==
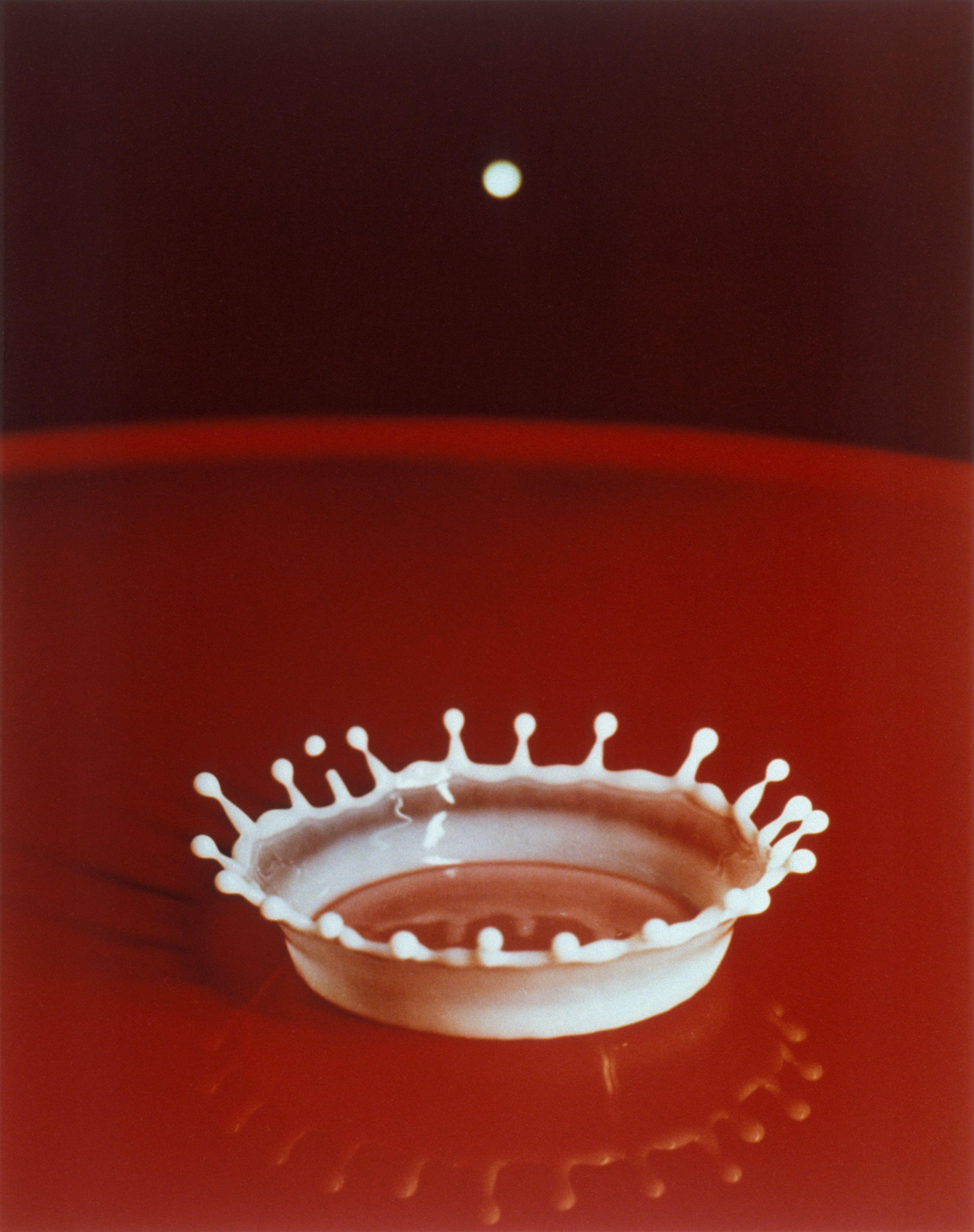
Milk Drop Coronet (1957)

- Flash! Seeing the Unseen by Ultra High-Speed Photography (1939, with James R. Killian Jr.). Boston: Hale, Cushman & Flint.
- Electronic Flash, Strobe (1970). New York: McGraw-Hill.
- Moments of Vision (1979, with Mr. Killian). Cambridge, Massachusetts: MIT. ISBN 0-262-05022-6
- Sonar Images (1986, with Mr. Killian). Englewood Cliffs, NJ: Prentice-Hall. ISBN 0-13-822651-2
- Stopping Time, a collection of his photographs, (1987). New York: H.N. Abrams. ISBN 0-8109-1514-6

=== Photographs ===
Some of Edgerton's noted photographs are :

- Hummingbirds (1936)
- Football Kick (1938)
- Gussie Moran's Tennis Swing (1949)
- Diver (1955)
- Milk Drop Coronet (1957)
- Cranberry Juice into Milk (1960)
- Moscow Circus (1963)
- Bullet Through Banana (1964)
- .30 Bullet Piercing an Apple (1964)
- Cutting the Card Quickly (1964)
- Pigeon Release (1965)
- Bullet Through Candle Flame (1973) (with Kim Vandiver)

== Exhibitions ==
- Flashes of Inspiration: The Work of Harold Edgerton, Massachusetts Institute of Technology, Cambridge, Massachusetts, 2009.
- Seeing the Unseen: The High Speed Photography of Dr. Harold Edgerton, Ikon Gallery, Birmingham, January 1976; then toured to The Photographers' Gallery, London; Hatton Gallery, Newcastle University; Midland Group Gallery, Nottingham; Modern Art Oxford; and Arnolfini, Bristol. Curated by John Myers and Geoffrey Holt.
- Seeing the Unseen: Photographs and films by Harold E. Edgerton, The Pallasades Shopping Centre, Birmingham. A repeat organised by Ikon Gallery of the previous exhibition.

== Collections ==
Edgerton's work is held in the following public collection:

- Museum of Modern Art, New York City: 29 prints (as of July 2018)
- International Photography Hall of Fame, St. Louis, MO
- Winnipeg Art Gallery | Qaumajuq - Winnipeg, MB: 60 prints

== See also ==
- Air-gap flash
