= Holderness, New Hampshire =

- Town
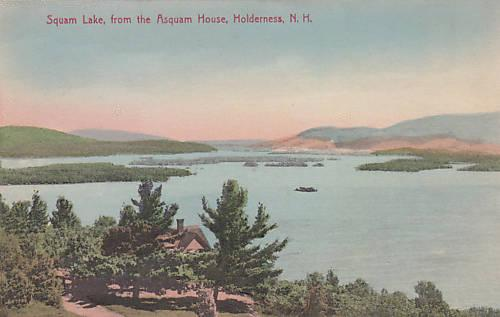
- Squam Lake c. 1910

- Seal

- Location in Grafton County, New Hampshire
- Coordinates: 43°45′01″N 71°35′17″W
- Country: United States
- State: New Hampshire
- County: Grafton
- Incorporated: 1761
- Named for: Robert Darcy, 4th Earl of Holderness
- Villages: Holderness; East Holderness

Area
  - Total: 35.7 sq mi (92.5 km^{2})
  - Land: 30.3 sq mi (78.6 km^{2})
  - Water: 5.4 sq mi (13.9 km^{2}) 15.05%
- Elevation: 866 ft (264 m)

Population (2020)
  - Total: 2,004
  - Density: 66/sq mi (25.5/km^{2})
- Time zone: UTC-5 (Eastern)
  - Summer (DST): UTC-4 (Eastern)
- ZIP code: 03245
- Area code: 603
- FIPS code: 33-36900
- GNIS feature ID: 873627
- Website: www.holderness-nh.gov

Holderness is a town in Grafton County, New Hampshire, United States. The population was 2,004 at the 2020 census. An agricultural and resort area, Holderness is home to the Squam Lakes Natural Science Center and is located on Squam Lake. Holderness is also home to Holderness School, a co-educational college-preparatory boarding school.

== History ==
The Squam Lakes were a trade route for the Abenaki and early European settlers, who traveled the Squam River to the Pemigewasset River, then to the Merrimack River and seacoast. In 1751, Thomas Shepard submitted a petition on behalf of 64 grantees to colonial Governor Benning Wentworth for 6 miles square on the Pemigewasset River. The governing council accepted, and the town was named after Robert Darcy, 4th Earl of Holderness. The French and Indian War, however, prevented settlement until after the 1759 Fall of Quebec. The land was regranted as "New Holderness" in 1761 to a group of New England families, and first settled in 1763. As proprietor of half the town, Samuel Livermore intended to create at New Holderness a great estate patterned after those of the English countryside. By 1790, the town had 329 residents, and in 1816, "New" was dropped from its name.

Holderness became a farming and fishing community, except for the "business or flat iron area" located on the Squam River, which has falls that drop about 112 feet (34 m) before meeting the Pemigewasset River. With water power to operate mills, the southwestern corner of town developed into an industrial center, to which the Boston, Concord & Montreal Railroad entered in 1849. But the mill village would be at odds with the agricultural community, especially when denied civic amenities including gaslights and sidewalks. Consequently, in 1868, it was set off as Ashland.

Tourists in the 19th century discovered the region's scenic mountains and lakes. Before the age of automobiles, they would depart the train in Ashland and board a steamer, which traveled up the Squam River to rustic fishing camps or hillside hotels beside Squam Lake. Today, Holderness remains a popular resort area, where in 1981 the movie On Golden Pond was filmed.

In 1924, pioneer ornithologist Katharine (Clark) Harding Day studied a breeding population of the veery (Catharus fuscescens) in Holderness.

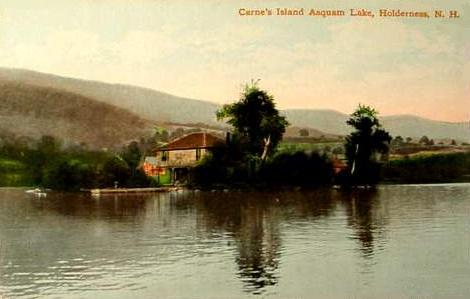
Carne's Island c. 1910

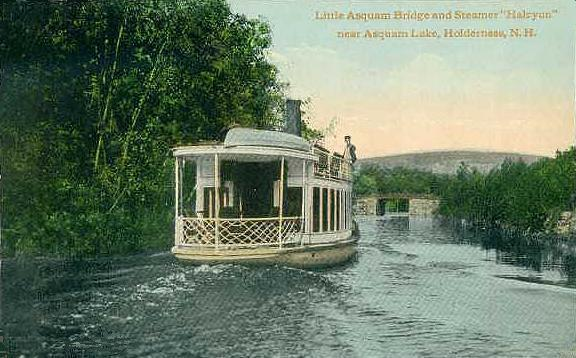
Steamer Halcyon c. 1910

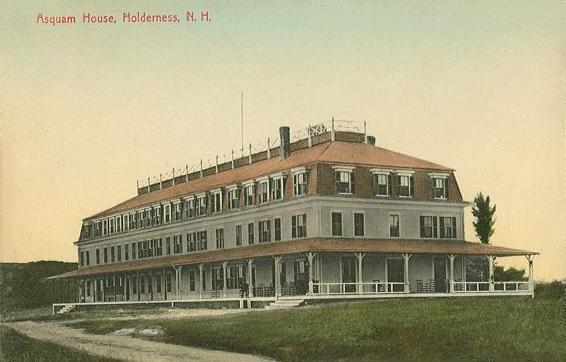
Asquam House in 1912. A "high-class modern hotel on Shepherd Hill on the shores of Asquam Lakes".

== Geography ==
Holderness is in central New Hampshire along the southeastern border of Grafton County. According to the U.S. Census Bureau, the town has a total area of 35.7 square miles (92.5 km^{2}), of which 30.3 square miles (78.6 km^{2}) are land and 5.4 square miles (13.9 km^{2}) are water, comprising 15.05% of the town. Bounded on the northwest by the Pemigewasset River, Holderness is drained by Owl Brook and the Squam River. Part of Squam Lake is in the east, and Little Squam Lake is in the center. Mount Prospect, with an elevation of 2,064 feet (629 m) above sea level, is in the north. The highest point in Holderness is Mount Webster in the northeast part of the town, elevation 2,076 feet (633 m) and part of the Squam Range. Via the Pemigewasset River, Holderness lies fully within the Merrimack River watershed.

The town is served by U.S. Route 3 and state routes 25, 113 and 175.

== Demographics ==
Historical population
Census	Pop.	Note	%±
1790	329		—
1800	531		61.4%
1810	835		57.3%
1820	1,160		38.9%
1830	1,429		23.2%
1840	1,528		6.9%
1850	1,744		14.1%
1860	1,765		1.2%
1870	793		−55.1%
1880	703		−11.3%
1890	595		−15.4%
1900	662		11.3%
1910	652		−1.5%
1920	602		−7.7%
1930	644		7.0%
1940	735		14.1%
1950	731		−0.5%
1960	749		2.5%
1970	1,048		39.9%
1980	1,586		51.3%
1990	1,694		6.8%
2000	1,930		13.9%
2010	2,108		9.2%
2020	2,004		−4.9%
U.S. Decennial Census

As of the census of 2000, there were 1,930 people, 768 households, and 546 families residing in the town. The population density was 63.5 inhabitants per square mile (24.5/km^{2}). There were 1,208 housing units at an average density of 39.8 per square mile (15.4/km^{2}). The racial makeup of the town was 97.88% White, 0.47% African American, 0.05% Native American, 0.36% Asian, 0.10% from other races, and 1.14% from two or more races. Hispanic or Latino of any race were 0.41% of the population.

There were 768 households, out of which 30.7% had children under the age of 18 living with them, 61.2% were married couples living together, 5.9% had a female householder with no husband present, and 28.9% were non-families. 21.5% of all households were made up of individuals, and 7.3% had someone living alone who was 65 years of age or older. The average household size was 2.48 and the average family size was 2.91.

In the town, the population was spread out, with 24.4% under the age of 18, 6.9% from 18 to 24, 24.5% from 25 to 44, 31.4% from 45 to 64, and 12.8% who were 65 years of age or older. The median age was 42 years. For every 100 females, there were 95.9 males. For every 100 females age 18 and over, there were 98.8 males.

The median income for a household in the town was $47,895, and the median income for a family was $55,526. Males had a median income of $36,500 versus $26,116 for females. The per capita income for the town was $27,825. About 2.8% of families and 4.9% of the population were below the poverty line, including 9.2% of those under age 18 and 4.0% of those age 65 or over.

== Town government ==
Holderness is governed in the traditional New England style, with a five-member board of selectmen as its executive branch, and the traditional town meeting as its legislative branch. Municipal elections and town meetings are customarily held in March.

== Notable people ==
- George Butler (1943–2021), documentary filmmaker (Pumping Iron, The Endurance)
- Moses Cheney (1793–1875), abolitionist, conductor on Underground Railroad
- Oren B. Cheney (1816–1903), founder of Bates College
- Arthur Livermore (1766–1853), US congressman
- Samuel Livermore (1732–1803), US senator
- Hercules Mooney (1715–1800), officer in the Continental Army
- Lorenzo L. Shaw (1828–1907), mill owner
- May Rogers Webster (1873–1938), naturalist, founded Lost River Conservation Camp
- James H. Wolff (1847–1913), lawyer, war veteran, civil rights activist

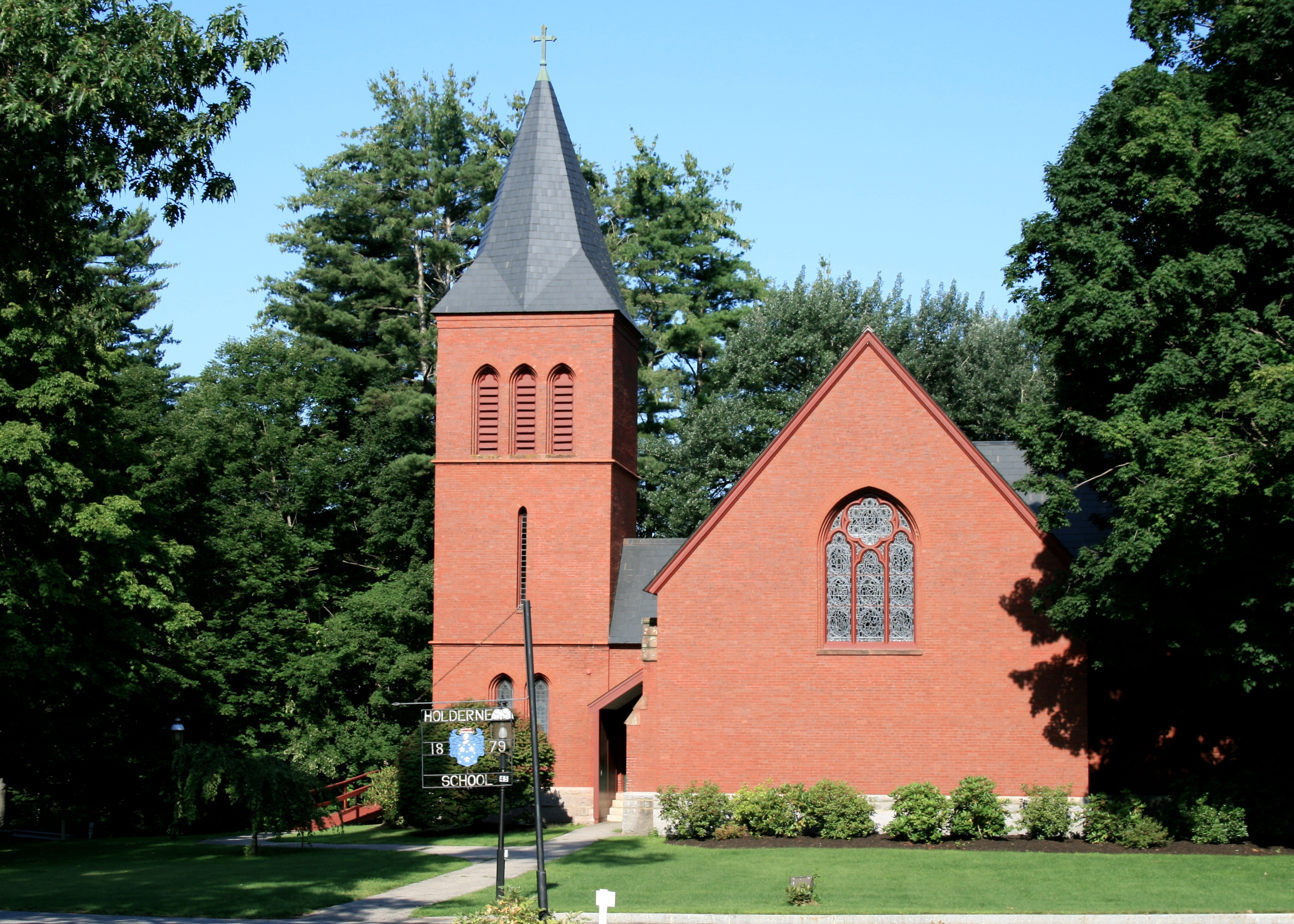
Chapel of the Holy Cross

== Sites of interest ==
The town has multiple properties listed on the National Register of Historic Places:

- Boulderwood, a private summer camp
- Burleigh Brae and Webster Boathouse
- Camp Carnes, a private summer camp
- Camp Ossipee, a private summer camp
- Chapel of the Holy Cross
- Chocorua Island Chapel
- Holderness Free Library
- Holderness Inn
- North Holderness Freewill Baptist Church–Holderness Historical Society Building
- Rockywold–Deephaven Camps
- Shepard Hill Historic District
- Trinity Church
- True Farm
- Watch Rock Camp, a private summer camp
- Webster Estate
