= Squam Lakes Natural Science Center =

Zoo in Holderness, New Hampshire, United States

- Interactive map of Squam Lakes Natural Science Center
- 43°44′02″N 71°35′22″W
- Date opened: July 1, 1969
- Location: Holderness, New Hampshire, United States
- Annual visitors: 53,000
- Website: www.nhnature.org

Squam Lakes Natural Science Center (SLNSC) is an environmental education center and zoo founded in 1966 and opened to the public on July 1, 1969. The science center is located in Holderness, New Hampshire, United States. The mission of the science center is to advance understanding of ecology by exploring New Hampshire's natural world.

The science center uses live animal exhibits, natural science education programs, and lake cruises to educate visitors about the natural world. Using the outdoors as a classroom and native New Hampshire animals as teaching ambassadors, the science center teaches the ecological concepts of adaptations, populations, interrelationships, and habitats.

== History ==
Planning for the center started in 1965, and 180 acres (73 ha) for the center was purchased in 1966 with money raised from the community. The center was opened to the public on July 1, 1969.

In September 2006, the center was first accredited by the Association of Zoos and Aquariums (AZA). It is the only AZA-accredited institution in northern New England. The science center was accredited for a second five-year term in September 2011, and again in September 2016. It regained accreditation in September 2026, following a lapse.

== Animals ==
- American black bear
- White-tailed deer
- Coyote
- Mountain lion
- Bobcat
- North American river otter
- Red fox
- Bald eagle
- American mink
- Barred owl
- Red-tailed hawk

== See also ==
- Holderness Inn, owned by the center and location of Kirkwood Gardens.
- May Rogers Webster (1873-1938), conservationist based in Holderness
