= North Holderness Freewill Baptist Church–Holderness Historical Society Building =

Historic church in New Hampshire, United States

- U.S. National Register of Historic Places
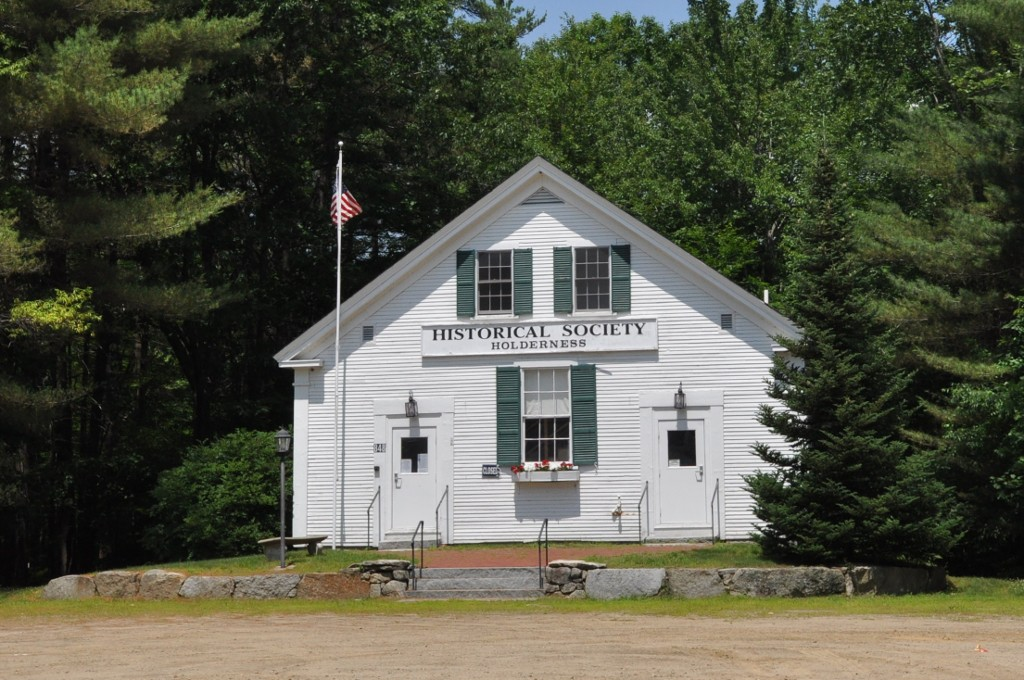

- Location within New Hampshire Location within the United States
- Location: U.S. Route 3, Holderness, New Hampshire
- Coordinates: 43°43′56″N 71°35′10″W
- Area: less than one acre
- Built: 1860
- Architect: John Jewell, John S. Drew
- NRHP reference No.: 86002171
- Added to NRHP: September 4, 1986

The North Holderness Freewill Baptist Church–Holderness Historical Society Building (Third Free Will Baptist Church of Holderness) is an historic church building in Holderness, New Hampshire. Built in 1860 for a Free Will Baptist congregation, it is a little-altered example of a rural vernacular church building. It was added to the National Register of Historic Places in 1986. The building was moved in 1994 from its original site on Owl Brook Road to U.S. Route 3 east of the center of Holderness by the Holderness Historic Society, who now own it.

== Description and history ==
The former North Holderness Freewill Baptist Church building is located in the village center of Holderness, at the back of a property just east of the Squam River crossing of US Route 3. It is a 1½-story frame structure, with a gabled roof and clapboarded exterior. The building corners have simple pilasters, and the gables have corner returns. Its main facade is three bays wide, with two entrances flanking a central window. Two smaller windows are set in the gable above. The side elevations each have two windows, and the rear wall has none. The interior consists of small vestibules at each entrance, separated by a choir niche, and a single large chamber. Floors are original wooden planking, and the walls are plaster with horizontal board wainscoting. A raised platform extends across much of the area in front of the north wall.

The church was built for a Free Will Baptist congregation founded in 1847 by the division of one serving all of what are now Holderness and Ashland. This congregation at first met in a local schoolhouse, and commissioned construction of this building in 1860. Who exactly built it is a subject of local debate; there are conflicting stories about the involvement of local builders John Jewell, John Drew, and a master carpenter named Worthen. The church was built on a small parcel on Owl Brook Road, purchased by the congregation for $20. The congregation was disbanded in 1894, but the church continued to be used for occasional services into the 20th century. It was acquired by the local historical society in 1970, and was moved to its present location in 1994.

== See also ==
- National Register of Historic Places listings in Grafton County, New Hampshire
