= Bernard Wagenaar =

American classical composer

Bernard Wagenaar (July 18, 1894 – May 19, 1971) was a Dutch-American composer, conductor and violinist.

Wagenaar was born in Arnhem. He studied at Utrecht University before starting his career as a teacher and conductor in 1914. He moved to the U.S. in 1920, and he became a citizen in 1927. From 1925 to 1968 he taught at the Juilliard School, where Tutti Camarata, James Cohn, Peter Dickinson, Jacob Druckman, Bernard Herrmann, Norman Dello Joio, Charles Jones, Jerome Moross, Mel Powell, Natalia Raigorodsky, Ned Rorem, Alan Shulman, Robert Ward and Katharine Mulky Warne were among his pupils. He was an active member of the League of Composers and similar organizations and was an officer of the Order of Orange-Nassau in the Netherlands. He died in York, Maine.

He wrote four symphonies (1926, 1930, 1936 and 1946) and other orchestral, vocal, and chamber music in a broadly neoclassical style.

His second symphony was one of the few American works Arturo Toscanini performed with the New York Philharmonic Orchestra; the first performances were on November 10, 11, and 13, 1933, in Carnegie Hall.
