= May Rogers Webster =

American naturalist

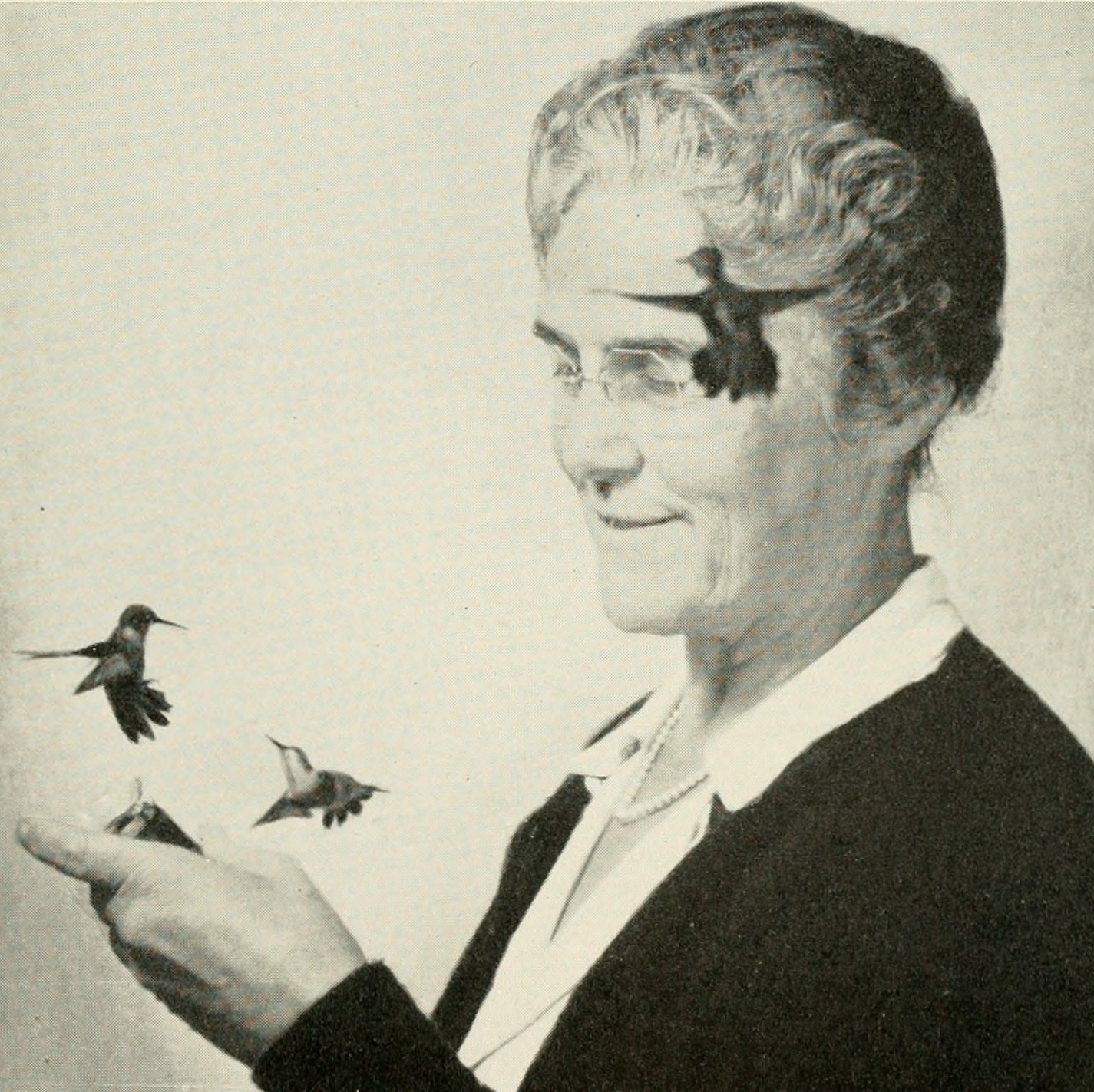
- May Rogers Webster with hummingbirds, photographed with a strobe light by Harold Eugene Edgerton
- Born: Alice May Rogers; May 23, 1873; Scituate, Massachusetts, United States
- Died: January 7, 1938 (aged 64); Boston, Massachusetts, United States
- Occupation: naturalist
- Known for: taming hummingbirds
- Notable work: starting environmental education programs in New Hampshire
- Spouse: Laurence Jackson Webster (m. 1901)
- Children: 1 son
- Parents: Thomas Lewis Rogers (father); Ella Sophia Nickerson Rogers (mother)

May Rogers Webster (May 23, 1873 – January 7, 1938) was an American naturalist active in New Hampshire, especially known for her knack of taming hummingbirds, but also for starting environmental education programs in that state.

== Early life ==
Alice May Rogers Webster (nee' Rogers) was born in Scituate, Massachusetts, the daughter of Thomas Lewis Rogers and Ella Sophia Nickerson Rogers. She was a member of the Massachusetts Society of Mayflower Descendants, tracing her ancestry to William Brewster.

== Hummingbirds, camp, and other activities ==
After reading a 1928 article about feeding hummingbirds in National Geographic by Margaret L. Bodine, Laurence J. Webster designed a blown-glass hummingbird feeder for his wife, May Rogers Webster, who enjoyed hummingbirds in the garden of their summer home in Holderness, New Hampshire. May Webster was elected as an associate of the American Ornithologists' Union in 1936. She hosted visiting scientists interested in the birds who frequented her garden. In 1950, after she died, the Webster feeder became the first commercially-produced hummingbird feeder, and the design is still called "the Webster feeder" by enthusiasts today.

In 1932, May Rogers Webster founded the New Hampshire Nature Camp at Lost River, and she ran the teacher training camp for several years. The teacher training camp continued summer programming at Lost River into the 1960s. In 1933, she began "Conservation Week" in New Hampshire schools, an annual observance dedicated to environmental education. In 1935, she spoke to the New Hampshire state meeting of Garden Clubs about conservation. She was active on the national level in the Garden Club of America. She was vice president of the New England Wildflower Preservation Society, and a member of the Massachusetts Society of Colonial Dames.

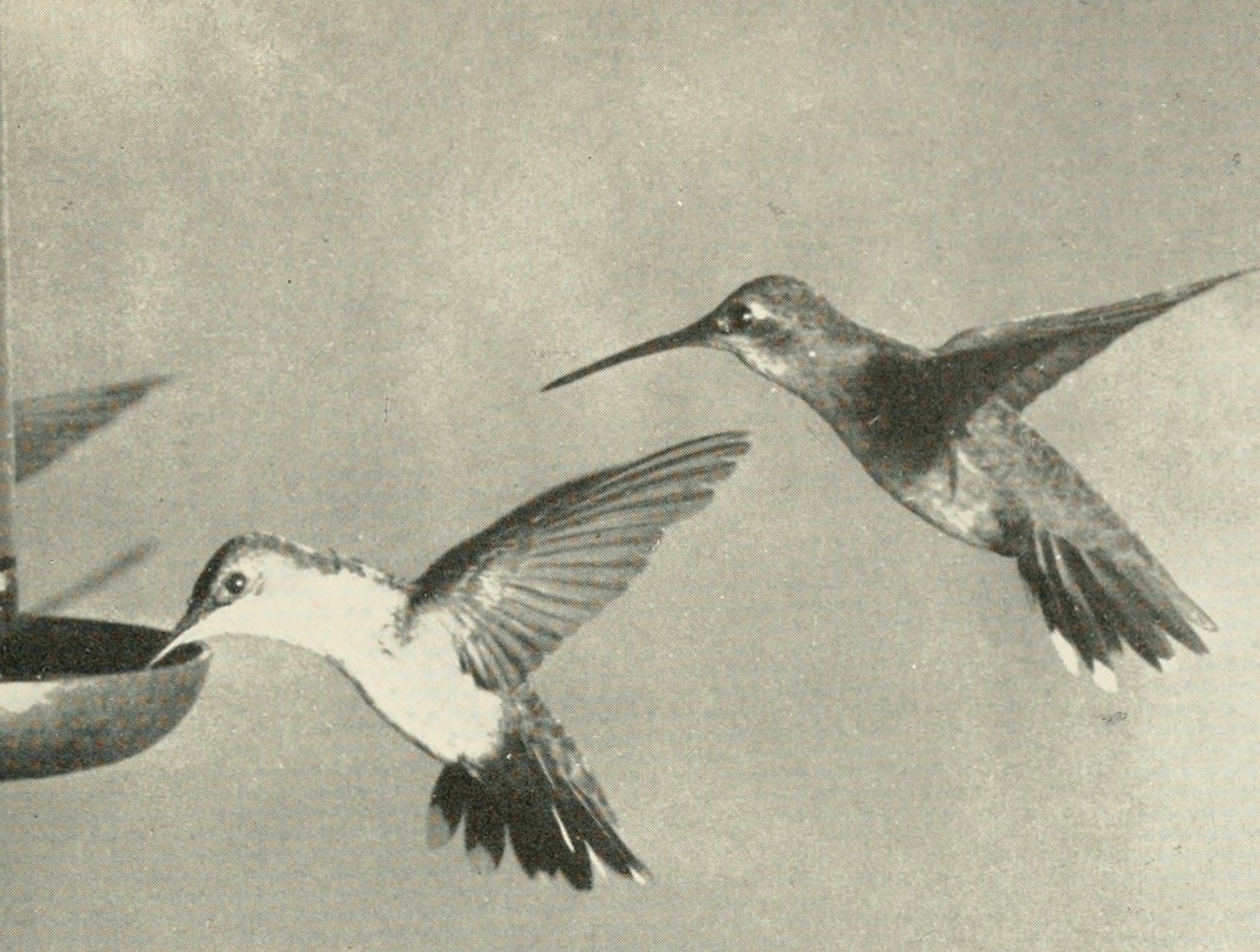
May Rogers Webster's birds

In 1936, she was visited by Harold E. Edgerton. He was able to illustrate with her help that it was possible to take photographs with an exposure of one hundred thousandth of a second using a strobe. Edgerton took photographs of hummingbirds in Holderness using the "Webster Feeder". A picture of her with the birds flying around her appeared in National Geographic.

== Personal life and legacy ==
May Rogers married Laurence Jackson Webster in 1901. They had a son, Frank George Webster, born 1903. She died in 1938, in Boston, Massachusetts. In 1966, Frank Webster donated the Lost River camp property to the Squam Lakes Association, in memory of Laurence and May, for the creation of the Squam Lakes Natural Science Center. May's great-grandson, Tim Fisher, has served as president of the Squam Lakes Association and chair of the Leadership Council of the Squam Lakes Uplands Conservation Project.
