= Holderness Free Library =

- U.S. National Register of Historic Places
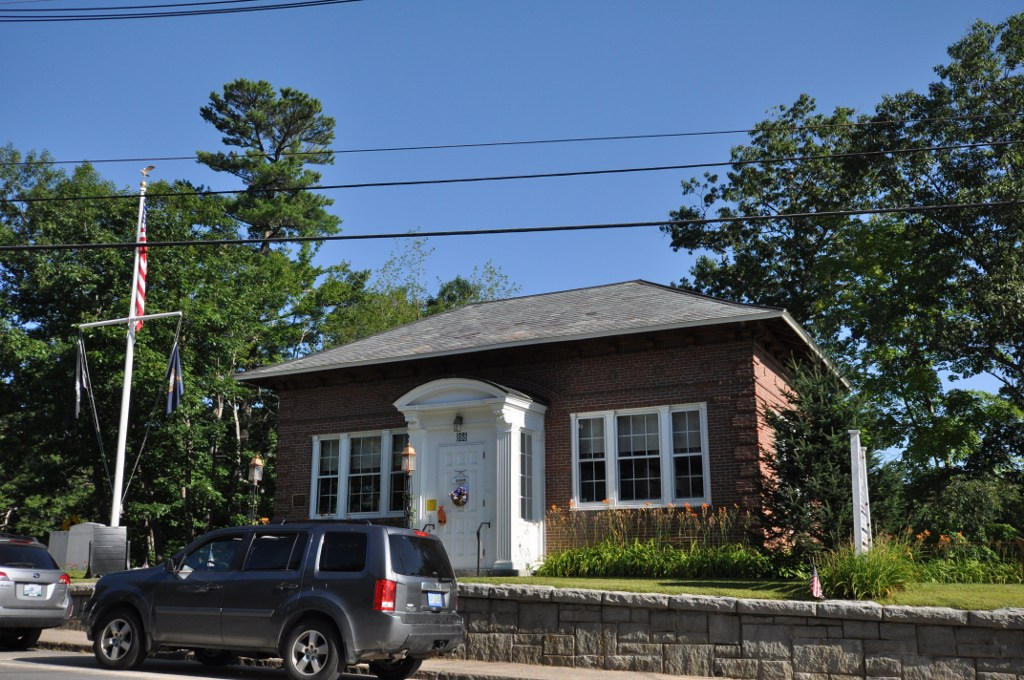

- Location within New Hampshire Location within the United States
- Location: 866 US 3, junction of NH 113, Holderness, New Hampshire
- Coordinates: 43°43′55″N 71°35′18″W
- Area: 0.4 acres (0.16 ha)
- Built: 1909
- Architect: Fox & Gale
- NRHP reference No.: 85000478
- Added to NRHP: March 7, 1985

The Holderness Free Library is the public library of Holderness, New Hampshire. It is located at 866 US Route 3, at its junction with New Hampshire Route 113. The architecturally eclectic building it presently occupies was built in 1909 to a design by Boston architects Fox & Gale, and was listed on the National Register of Historic Places in 1985. It was the first purpose-built building for the library, which had occupied private homes and other facilities since its founding in 1893.

== Architecture and history ==
The Holderness Free Library is located prominently in the village center of Holderness, at the northeast corner of US 3 and New Hampshire 113, on a lot overlooking the Squam River. It is a small single-story masonry building, with a brick exterior on a stone foundation. It is covered by a hip roof with slightly flared eaves, under which are elaborately decorated rafter ends. The brickwork is mostly common bond, with corner quoining and bands of corbelling above the window bays. The entrance is at the center of the symmetrical south-facing front facade, sheltered by a wood-frame vestibule whose entrance has a Classical surround of fluted pilasters and a segmented-arch pediment. The interior is a single large chamber, finished in a variety of woodwork.

The library has its beginnings in a private collection established by summer residents in 1878, which was loaned to the public from a private residence. In 1893, the town officially adopted this collection, which was placed in Whitten's General Store. The store (and several other buildings in the village center) were destroyed by fire in 1906, reducing most of the original collection to ashes. Private funds, raised mainly from wealthy summer residents, paid for the construction of this building, which was completed in 1909 to a design by the Boston firm of Fox & Gale. The building is one of the architecturally most eclectic in the New Hampshire Lakes Region, exhibiting a harmonious combination of Classical, Colonial Revival, and Victorian elements.

== See also ==
- National Register of Historic Places listings in Grafton County, New Hampshire
