= Watch Rock Camp =

Historic house in New Hampshire, United States

- U.S. National Register of Historic Places
- Location: Address restricted Holderness, New Hampshire
- Area: 21 acres (8.5 ha)
- Built: 1926
- Architectural style: Francis Y. Joannes
- MPS: Squam MPS
- NRHP reference No.: 13000973
- Added to NRHP: December 24, 2013

Watch Rock Camp is a historic summer camp in Holderness, New Hampshire. Located off New Hampshire Route 113 on the shore of Squam Lake, the camp was built in 1926 for Herbert and Elizabeth Gallaudet; he was a scion of the founders of Gallaudet College. The camp was designed by New York City architect Francis Y. Joannes.

The camp was listed on the National Register of Historic Places in 2013.

== See also ==
- Camp Carnes
- National Register of Historic Places listings in Grafton County, New Hampshire
