= Camp Carnes =

- U.S. National Register of Historic Places
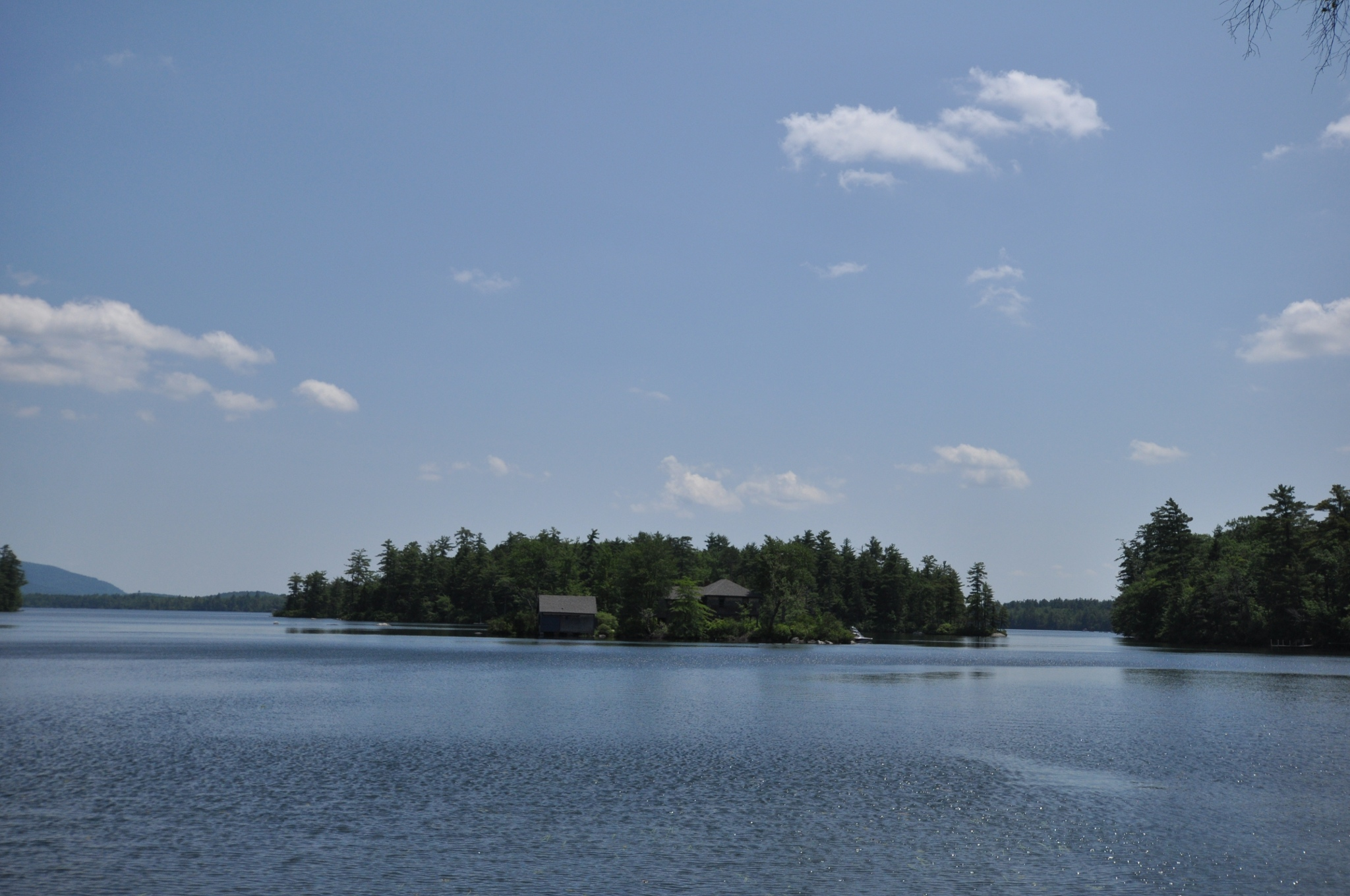

- Location within New Hampshire Location within the United States
- Location: On an island in Carnes Cove, Squam Lake, Holderness, New Hampshire
- Coordinates: 43°45′46″N 71°33′26″W
- Built: 1894
- MPS: Squam MPS
- NRHP reference No.: 12000506
- Added to NRHP: August 15, 2012

Camp Carnes is a historic private summer camp in Holderness, New Hampshire. Located on an island in Squam Lake's Carnes Cove off New Hampshire Route 113, the 1894 camp is one of the first to be established on an island in Squam Lake, and forms part of the extensive set of properties owned by the locally prominent Webster family. The camp was listed on the National Register of Historic Places in 2012.

== Description and history ==
Carnes Cove is a tongue of Squam Lake projecting northward on the northwestern part of Squam Lake in northeastern Holderness. Carnes Island is one of the smaller islands in the cove, located between Groton Island, the largest, and the northern mainland.

The Squam Lake area was largely agricultural into the last quarter of the 19th century, when interest began to build in the area as a summer tourist destination. Frank and Mary Webster, he a partner in the New York City firm of Kidder, Peabody & Co., summered for several years at the Asquam House hotel in Holderness before purchasing Carnes and Groton Islands in 1894; the earliest known island camp on Squam Lake is that of the Cook family on Kent Island, established in 1886. Prior to their purchase, Carnes Island had housed a fishing shanty used by William Carnes, which they replaced with a more gracious building. Although supposedly rustic in character, the Websters brought maids with them to the camp each summer, and served meals on linen and china bearing the name "Camp Carnes". The Websters later purchased large tracts of the nearby mainland, where they developed the Webster Estate.

== See also ==
- Burleigh Brae and Webster Boathouse
- National Register of Historic Places listings in Grafton County, New Hampshire
