= Shepard Hill Historic District =

Historic district in New Hampshire, United States

- U.S. National Register of Historic Places
- U.S. Historic district
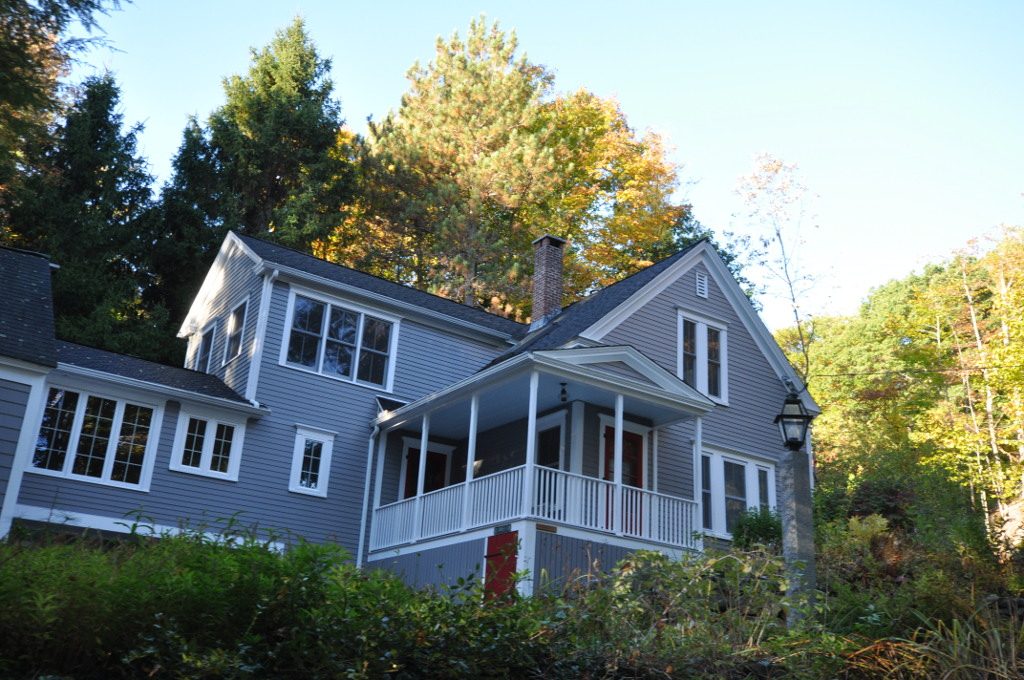
- 200 Shepard Hill Road

- Location within New Hampshire Location within the United States
- Location: 109, 135, 177, 180, 200 Shepard Hill, 6, 19, 31, 33, 35, 41 Coxboro & all of Asquam Rds., 584 US 3, Holderness, New Hampshire
- Coordinates: 43°43′32″N 71°34′14″W
- Area: 111 acres (45 ha)
- NRHP reference No.: 14000843
- Added to NRHP: October 8, 2014

The Shepard Hill Historic District encompasses an enclave of summer retreat properties in Holderness, New Hampshire. Centered on a stretch of Shepard Hill Road east of Holderness center, the area was one of the first to be developed as a summer estate area in the vicinity of Squam Lake, which Shepard Hill provided expansive views of. It includes 17 historic summer houses, built between 1870 and 1921, and a chapel. The district was listed on the National Register of Historic Places in 2014.

== Description and history ==
The Shepard Hill area, located at the southern end of Squam Lake, was until the late 19th century a farm property owned by members of the Shepard family, whose name is given to the hill. The first property to be developed specifically as a summer residence in the Squam area, The Pines, was built in 1870 by William and Elizabeth Norton of New Haven, Connecticut. The hill, then relatively treeless, afforded fine views of the lake below, and was less subject to the annoyance of insects than waterfront properties. Over the next few decades, the hill was gradually populated by an increasing number of summer properties, some of which were owned by friends of the Nortons. In 1881, a hotel was built near the summit of the hill, which was instantly popular, necessitating multiple additions. The hotel was demolished in 1948; its guests included the poet John Greenleaf Whittier.

The historic district includes the bulk of Shepard Hill, and includes properties on Shepard Hill Road, Asquam Road, Coxboro Road, and United States Route 3. The eastern boundary is roughly at Coxboro Road, and the western boundary excludes a cluster of more recent houses and inns on Shepard Hill Road. It includes the former site of the Asquam Hotel on the hill's summit, as well as 17 summer houses and numerous outbuildings. The houses are generally sited to provide views of Squam Lake. The only building not built as part of a residential compound is the former St. Peter's Church, a Stick style structure built in 1888, and since converted into a residence.

== See also ==
- National Register of Historic Places listings in Grafton County, New Hampshire
