= Burleigh Brae and Webster Boathouse =

Historic house in New Hampshire, United States

- U.S. National Register of Historic Places
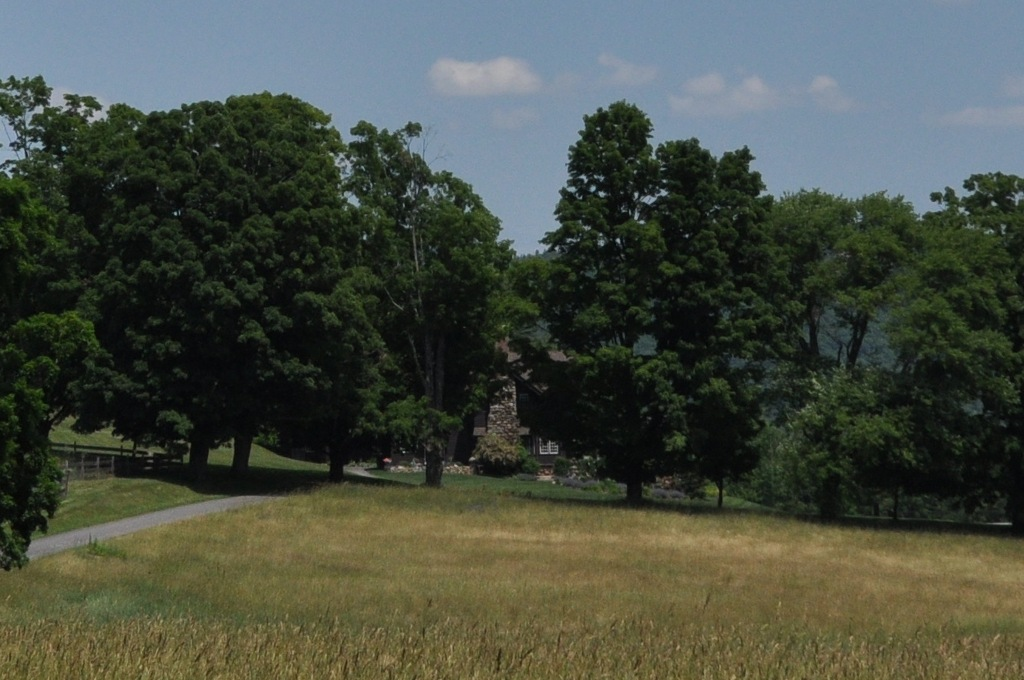
- Burleigh Brae in 2014

- Location within New Hampshire Location within the United States
- Location: Holderness, New Hampshire
- Coordinates: 43°45′43″N 71°33′40″W
- Built: 1911
- Architect: Chapman & Foster
- Architectural style: Bungalow/Craftsman
- MPS: Squam MPS
- NRHP reference No.: 12000505
- Added to NRHP: August 15, 2012

Burleigh Brae and Webster Boathouse are a historic summerhouse and boathouse in Holderness, New Hampshire. Located near Carns Cove off New Hampshire Route 113, Burleigh Brae is part of an extensive estate owned by the locally prominent Webster family. It was designed by Chapman & Foster and was built in 1911 for Edwin S. Webster. The boathouse, located on the shore of Squam Lake, was built c. 1913.

The buildings were listed on the National Register of Historic Places in 2012.

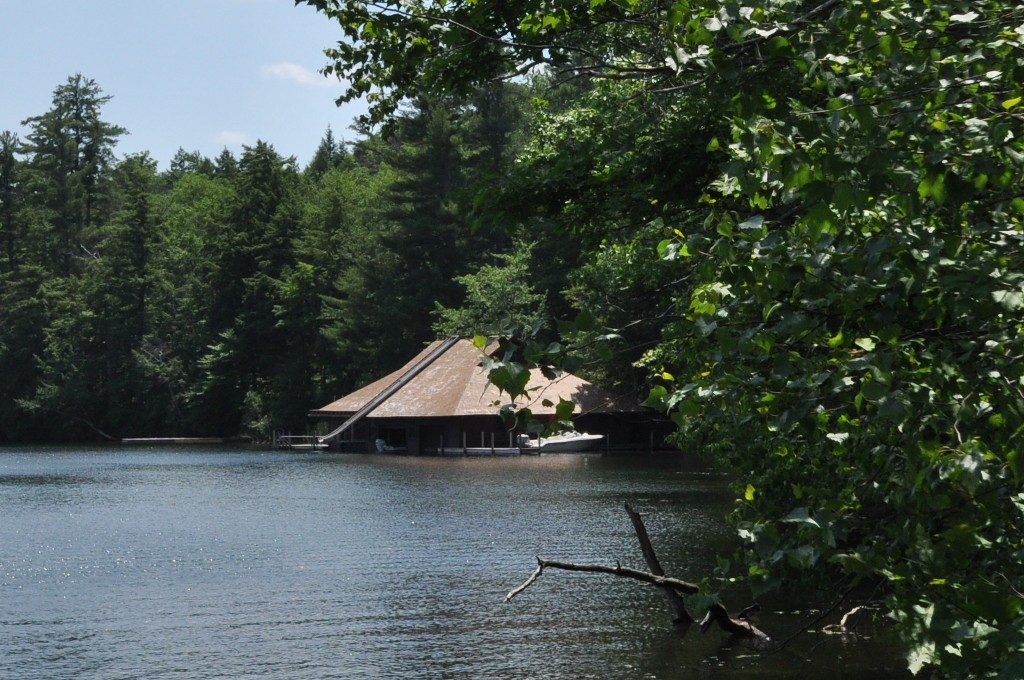
The Webster Boathouse

== See also ==
- Webster Estate
- National Register of Historic Places listings in Grafton County, New Hampshire
