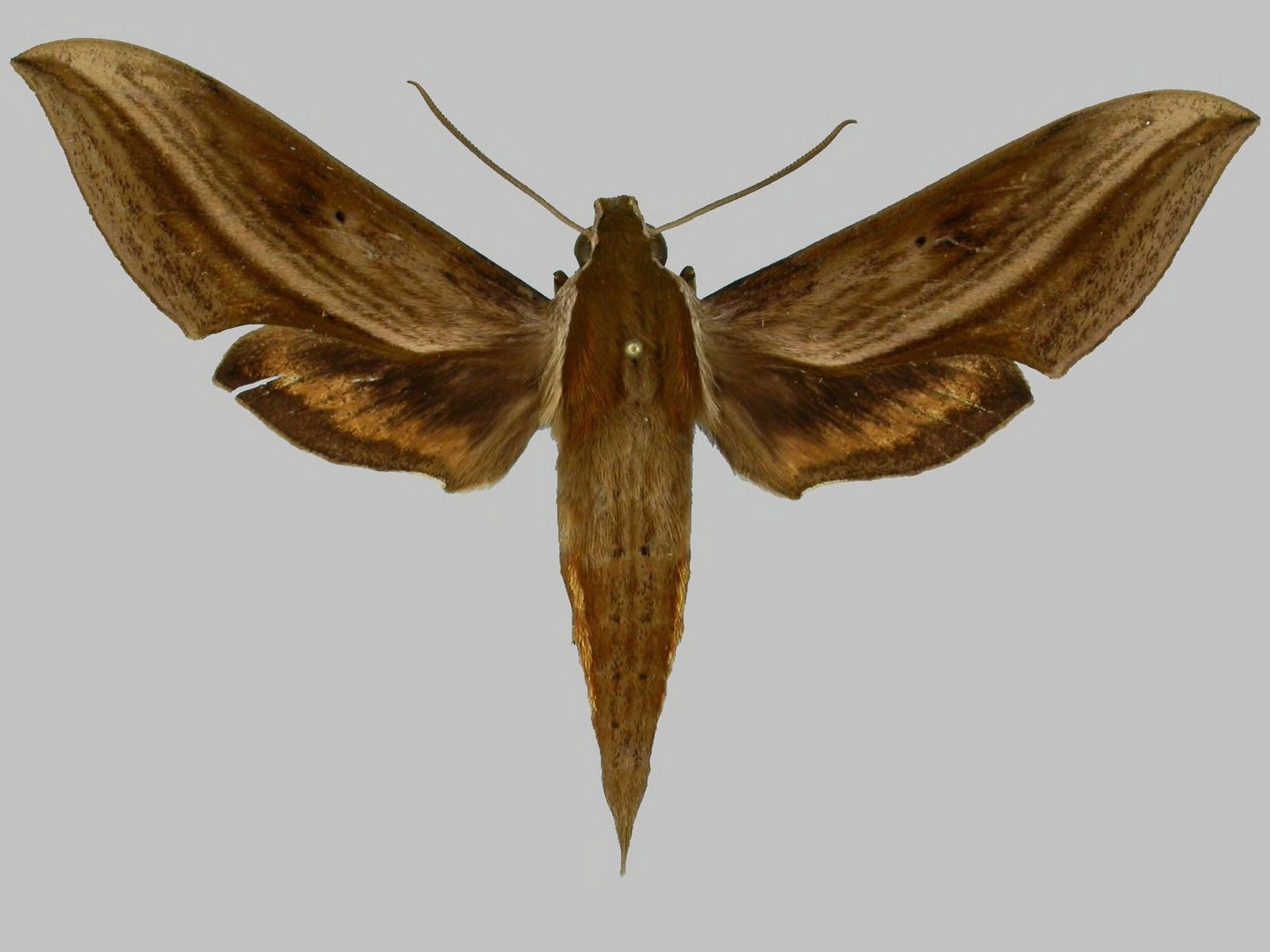

Scientific classification
- Domain: Eukaryota
- Kingdom: Animalia
- Phylum: Arthropoda
- Class: Insecta
- Order: Lepidoptera
- Family: Sphingidae
- Genus: Xylophanes
- Species: X. damocrita

Binomial name
- Xylophanes damocrita (H. Druce, 1894)

Synonyms
- Chaerocampa damocrita H. Druce, 1894

= Xylophanes damocrita =

Species of moth

Xylophanes damocrita is a moth of the family Sphingidae first described by Herbert Druce in 1894. It is known from Mexico.

The ground colour of the uppersides of the forewings and body is dark olive green or brown. The tegula is dark olive green with a median longitudinal dark golden-yellow line. There is another line of the same colour posterior to the tegula on the mesothorax. The abdomen has a buff basal patch, posterior to which is a dark golden-yellow stripe. The basal half of the forewing upperside is dark olive green or brown with a buff median area as far as third postmedian line. The discal spot is small and black, immediately distal of which are two short, broad darker dashes. The pale area between the third and fourth postmedian bands is conspicuous, joining a buff patch on the inner edge to a similarly coloured triangular pre-apical patch on the costa. The fourth postmedian line is well developed and the area between this and the fifth postmedian line is dark orange. The hindwing upperside is dark brown and the median band is variable in width and dark orange.

There are at least two generations per year.

The larvae probably feed on Rubiaceae and Malvaceae species.
