= Hewitt House (Enfield, New Hampshire) =

Historic house in New Hampshire, United States

- U.S. National Register of Historic Places
- U.S. Historic district – Contributing property
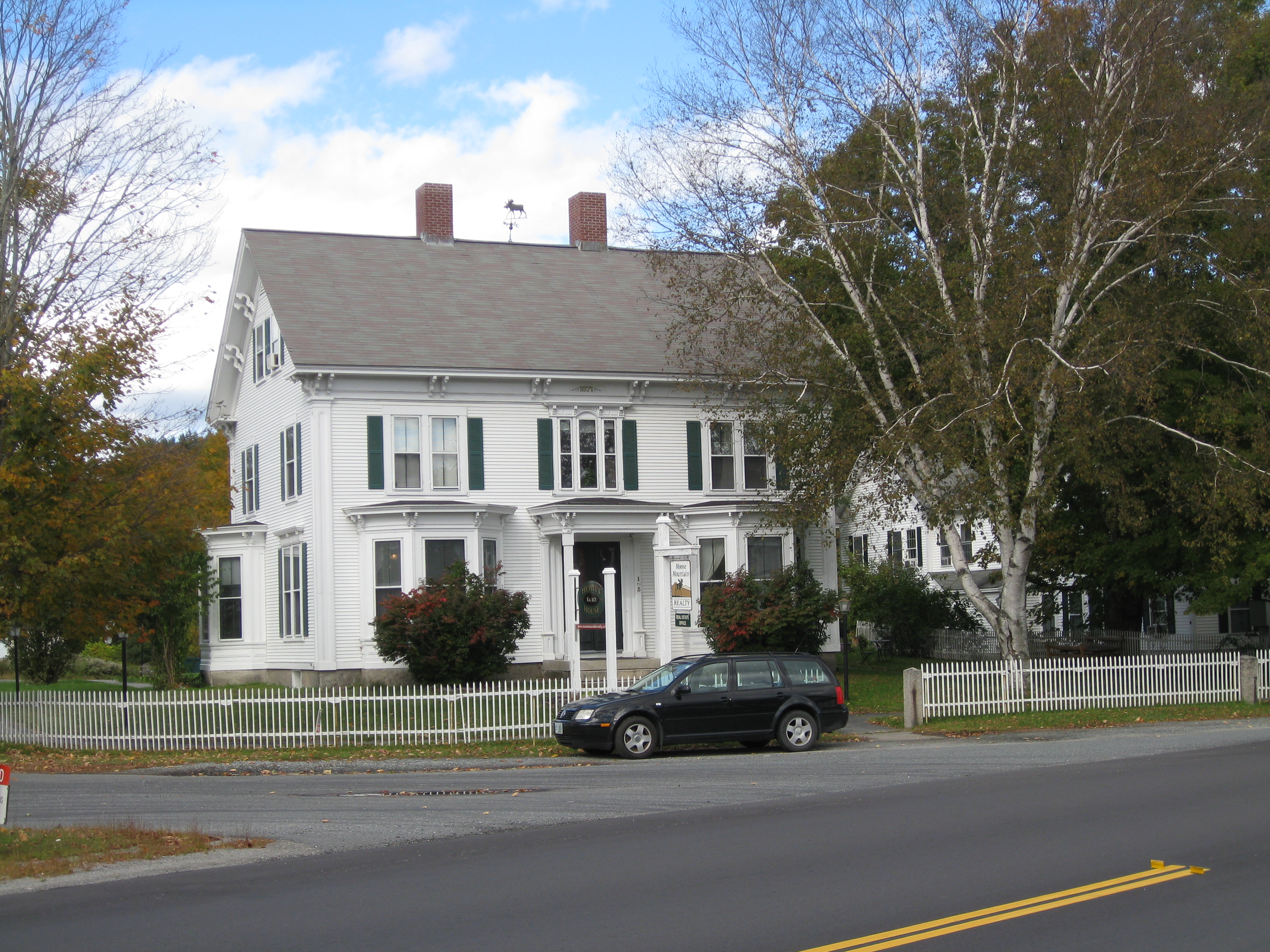

- Location within New Hampshire Location within the United States
- Location: US 4, Enfield, New Hampshire
- Coordinates: 43°38′41″N 72°8′37″W
- Area: less than one acre
- Built: 1871
- Architect: John W. Dodge
- Architectural style: Greek Revival, Italianate, Vernacular Italianate
- Part of: Enfield Village Historic District (ID10000186)
- NRHP reference No.: 85002778

Significant dates
- Added to NRHP: November 7, 1985
- Designated CP: April 19, 2010

The Hewitt House is a historic house on United States Route 4 in Enfield, New Hampshire. Built in 1871, it is a particularly fine example of late Italianate architecture, built for the manager of local woolen mills. The house was listed on the National Register of Historic Places in 1985, and included in the Enfield Village Historic District in 2010.

== Description ==
The Hewitt House is located in the village of Enfield, at the northeast corner of U.S. Route 4 and Maple Street. It is a 2½-story wood-frame structure, with a gabled roof, two interior chimneys, and clapboarded exterior. The house is three bays wide and two deep, with paired brackets in the eaves. The front facade is symmetrical about the main entrance, with paired windows in each bay on the second floor, and projecting polygonal bay windows on the ground floor. The bay window roofs and the front entry portico are covered by shallow-pitch roofs with brackets matching those in the main roof line.

The house was built in 1871 by John W. Dodge, a native of nearby Lebanon. The corner it stands on was known at the time as Dodge's Corner. Dodge came to Enfield to manage the locally important Shaker-owned woolen mills, a role he served until 1885, when the Shakers relocated their operation to Bristol. He also served one term in the New Hampshire Senate. The house remained in the hands of Dodge's descendants for over a century (the last being Robert Hewitt). The Hewitts were also locally prominent, as owners of a press which published local newspapers and magazines.

== Architecture ==
The Italianate house is a reflection of Enfield's period of great prosperity in the years after the American Civil War, and an example of vernacular Italianate architecture.

== See also ==
- National Register of Historic Places listings in Grafton County, New Hampshire
