= Sawyer–Medlicott House =

Historic house in New Hampshire, United States

- U.S. National Register of Historic Places
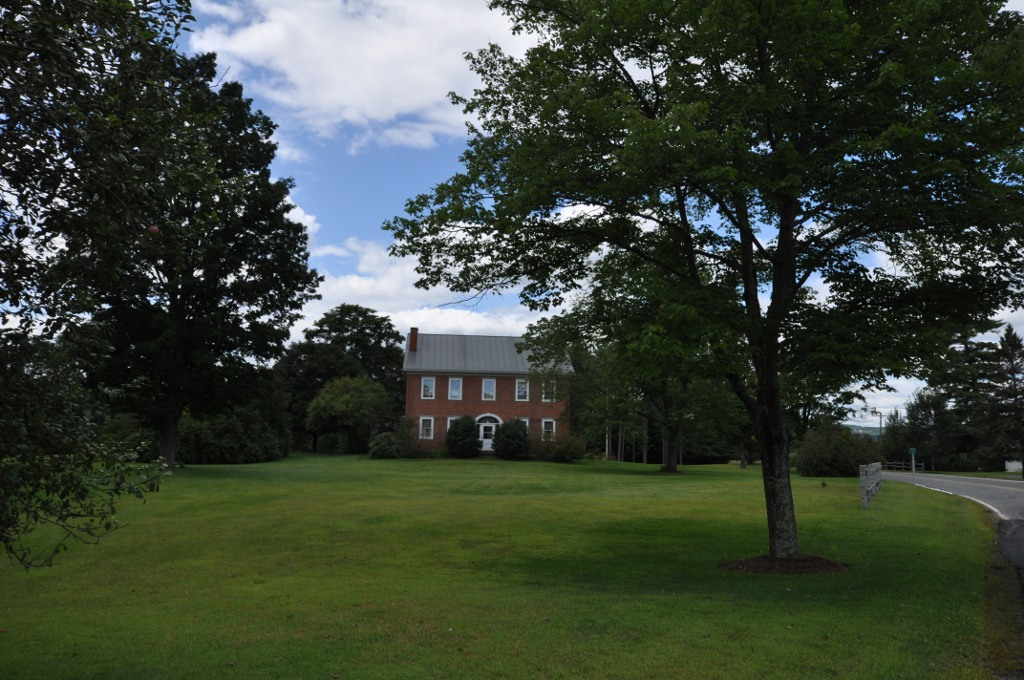

- Location within New Hampshire Location within the United States
- Location: Jct. of Bradford and River Rds., Piermont, New Hampshire
- Coordinates: 43°58′40″N 72°6′21″W
- Area: 5.9 acres (2.4 ha)
- Built: 1820
- Architectural style: Federal
- NRHP reference No.: 91001757
- Added to NRHP: December 6, 1991

The Sawyer–Medlicott House is a historic house at the junction of Bradford and River roads in Piermont, New Hampshire. Built about 1820, it is a good example of Federal period architecture, and the only brick house of that style in the small town. It was built for Joseph Sawyer, a real estate speculator and politician. The house was listed on the National Register of Historic Places in 1991.

== Description and history ==
The Sawyer–Medlicott House is located west of the town center of Piermont, on the south side of Bradford Road (New Hampshire Route 25) near its junction with River Road. It is a 2½-story brick building, with a side gabled roof and end chimneys. The main facade is five bays wide, with sash windows arranged symmetrically around the main entrance. The entry is framed by partial sidelights and fluted pilasters, and topped by a segmented fanlight and an elliptical outer surround that is decorated with rosettes and rope moulding. The interior follows a central hall plan, with a spiral staircase the centerpiece of the hall. Windows are fitted with interior shutters, and many rooms have horizontal wainscoting made of wide boards.

The house was built c. 1820, and is the only Federal-style brick building in the town. It was built for Joseph Sawyer, a real estate speculator and politician. Sawyer was also a part owner of the first bridge to span the nearby Connecticut River to Bradford, Vermont, where the 1928 Piermont Bridge now stands. He was active in town affairs, serving on local committees and representing it in the state legislature. When he died, the property was sold to pay off his insolvent estate, and was later repurchased by a nephew.

== See also ==
- National Register of Historic Places listings in Grafton County, New Hampshire
