= National Register of Historic Places listings in Grafton County, New Hampshire =

Location of Grafton County in New Hampshire

This is a list of the National Register of Historic Places listings in Grafton County, New Hampshire.

This is intended to be a complete list of the properties and districts on the National Register of Historic Places in Grafton County, New Hampshire, United States. Latitude and longitude coordinates are provided for many National Register properties and districts; these locations may be seen together in a map.

There are 80 properties and districts listed on the National Register in the county, including one National Historic Landmark.

Contents: Counties in New Hampshire
Belknap - Carroll - Cheshire - Coös - Grafton - Hillsborough - Merrimack - Rockingham - Strafford - Sullivan

This National Park Service list is complete through NPS recent listings posted May 1, 2026.

== Current listings ==
	Name on the Register	Image	Date listed	Location	City or town	Description
1	Ashland Gristmill and Dam	Ashland Gristmill and Dam	December 10, 1979 (#79000317)	Main St. 43°41′44″N 71°37′51″W	Ashland	On the Squam River
2	Ashland Junior High School	Ashland Junior High School	April 8, 1983 (#83001137)	12 School St. 43°41′50″N 71°38′06″W	Ashland	Now a community center
3	Ashland Railroad Station	Ashland Railroad Station	November 10, 1982 (#82000617)	39 Depot St. 43°41′26″N 71°38′04″W	Ashland	Now a local museum
4	Ashland Town Hall	Ashland Town Hall	March 24, 1983 (#83001138)	10 Highland St. 43°41′48″N 71°37′57″W	Ashland	
5	Bath Covered Bridge	Bath Covered Bridge	September 1, 1976 (#76000125)	Off U.S. Route 302/NH 10; 44°10′01″N 71°58′03″W	Bath	Over Ammonoosuc River
6	Bedell Covered Bridge	Bedell Covered Bridge	May 28, 1975 (#75002171)	Crossed the Connecticut River between Haverhill and Newbury; 44°02′42″N 72°04′27″W	Haverhill	
7	Boulderwood	Boulderwood	April 9, 2018 (#100002300)	Address Restricted	Holderness	
8	Brick Store	Brick Store	November 7, 1985 (#85002780)	21 Lisbon Road; 44°10′00″N 71°58′00″W	Bath	
9	Bristol Town Hall	Bristol Town Hall	September 29, 2015 (#15000668)	45 Summer St. 43°35′33″N 71°44′08″W	Bristol	
10	Burleigh Brae and Webster Boathouse	Burleigh Brae and Webster Boathouse	August 15, 2012 (#12000505)	near NH 113; 43°45′43″N 71°33′40″W	Holderness	Part of the Squam MPS (Note: For additional properties that are part of the Squam MPS see National Register of Historic Places listings in Carroll County, New Hampshire.)
11	Burt–Cheney Farm	Burt–Cheney Farm	March 25, 1982 (#82001674)	U.S. Route 302; 44°17′33″N 71°45′24″W	Bethlehem	
12	Camp Carnes	Camp Carnes	August 15, 2012 (#12000506)	On an island in Carns Cove, Squam Lake; 43°45′46″N 71°33′26″W	Holderness	Part of the Squam MPS
13	Camp Mowglis	Camp Mowglis	June 20, 2019 (#100004085)	6 Mowglis Dr. 43°41′46″N 71°46′15″W	Hebron	
14	Camp Ossipee	Camp Ossipee	April 10, 2013 (#13000154)	11 & 13 Porter Rd. 43°44′39″N 71°32′57″W	Holderness	Part of the Squam MPS
15	Canaan Meetinghouse	Canaan Meetinghouse	March 24, 1972 (#72001598)	Canaan St. 43°39′55″N 72°02′34″W	Canaan	
16	Canaan Street Historic District	Canaan Street Historic District	May 7, 1973 (#73000163)	Canaan St. 43°39′56″N 72°02′32″W	Canaan	
17	Daniel Carr House	Daniel Carr House	March 27, 1992 (#92000156)	Northern side of Brier Hill Rd., 1.5 mi (2.4 km) from its junction with NH 10; 44°06′35″N 72°00′16″W	Haverhill	
18	Central Square Historic District	Central Square Historic District	March 24, 1983 (#83001139)	2-27 Central Square, 1 Summer St., 1-3 N. Main St., and 2 S. Main St. 43°35′29″N 71°44′11″W	Bristol	
19	Centre Village Meeting House	Centre Village Meeting House	June 6, 1985 (#85001197)	NH 4A; 43°35′24″N 72°06′38″W	Enfield	
20	Chapel of the Holy Cross	Chapel of the Holy Cross	September 7, 2005 (#05000971)	45 Chapel Ln. 43°45′31″N 71°40′31″W	Holderness	On the campus of the Holderness School
21	Chocorua Island Chapel		September 20, 2016 (#16000644)	40 Chocorua Island, Squam Lake; 43°45′20″N 71°32′34″W	Holderness	
22	Colburn Park Historic District	Colburn Park Historic District	January 10, 1986 (#86000782)	N., S., E., and W. Park Sts., 3 Campbell St., 1 School St., 1 Bank St., and 9-10 Lebanon Mall; also part of Campbell Street, Court Street, Part of Hanover Street /Lebanon Mall, Part of Mascoma Street, Part of School Street, West Park Street; 43°38′31″N 72°15′08″W	Lebanon	The second set of addresses represent a boundary increase approved July 31, 2025.
23	Dorchester Common Historic District	Dorchester Common Historic District	March 7, 1985 (#85000477)	Roughly bounded by N. Dorchester 0.2-mile (0.32 km) northwest of its intersection with NH 118; 43°45′25″N 71°56′59″W	Dorchester	
24	Dorchester Community Church	Dorchester Community Church	November 25, 1980 (#80000284)	Off NH 118; 43°45′25″N 71°57′01″W	Dorchester	
25	Dow Academy	Dow Academy	August 31, 1982 (#82001675)	Dow Ave. 44°13′32″N 71°44′53″W	Franconia	
26	East Branch and Lincoln Logging Railroad Historic District		January 20, 2026 (#100012568)	Address Restricted; 44°06′07″N 71°34′22″W	Lincoln vicinity	
27	Enfield Center Town House	Enfield Center Town House	July 17, 2017 (#100001318)	1044 NH 4A; 43°35′28″N 72°06′37″W	Enfield	
28	Enfield Shaker Historic District	Enfield Shaker Historic District	November 7, 1979 (#79000198)	NH 4A; 43°37′13″N 72°08′49″W	Enfield	
29	Enfield Village Historic District	Enfield Village Historic District	April 19, 2010 (#10000186)	Main St, U.S. Route 4, High St, Balti St, Shaker Hill Rd, Wells St, Stevens, Union, & Pillsbury Sts, Shedd & Mill St. 43°38′31″N 72°08′42″W	Enfield	
30	The Epic of American Civilization Murals	The Epic of American Civilization Murals	February 27, 2013 (#13000283)	6025 Baker-Berry Library; 43°42′18″N 72°17′21″W	Hanover	
31	Felsengarten	Felsengarten	June 18, 1973 (#73002296)	Southwest of Bethlehem on Lewis Hill Rd. 44°15′20″N 71°42′20″W	Bethlehem	
32	First Free Will Baptist Church and Vestry	First Free Will Baptist Church and Vestry	April 8, 1983 (#83001140)	57 Main St. 43°41′42″N 71°37′59″W	Ashland	Currently the Ashland Baptist Church
33	Frost Place	Frost Place	November 30, 1976 (#76000126)	South of Franconia off NH 116 on Ridge Rd. 44°12′46″N 71°45′27″W	Franconia	
34	Goodall-Woods Law Office	Goodall-Woods Law Office	August 26, 1980 (#80000285)	Northeast of Bath on U.S. Route 302; 44°10′35″N 71°56′40″W	Bath	
35	Great Hollow Road Stone Arch Bridge	Great Hollow Road Stone Arch Bridge	May 12, 1997 (#97000372)	Great Hollow Rd. over Mink Brook, approximately 100 ft (30 m) north of its junction with Smith Ln. 43°41′13″N 72°14′00″W	Hanover	
36	Abbie Greenleaf Library	Abbie Greenleaf Library	June 13, 2003 (#03000526)	439 Main St. 44°13′36″N 71°44′43″W	Franconia	
37	Hanover Town Library	Hanover Town Library	April 25, 1997 (#97000371)	130 Etna Rd. 43°41′41″N 72°13′06″W	Hanover	
38	Haverhill Corner Historic District	Haverhill Corner Historic District	August 27, 1987 (#87001415)	NH 10 from N. Piermont to its bisection of NH 25 and Court St. 44°01′53″N 72°03′51″W	Haverhill	
39	Haverhill–Bath Covered Bridge	Haverhill–Bath Covered Bridge	April 18, 1977 (#77000091)	NH 135; 44°09′16″N 72°02′12″W	Woodsville and Bath	Over the Ammonoosuc River
40	Hebron Village Historic District	Hebron Village Historic District	March 7, 1985 (#85000492)	Roughly bounded by the Hebron Village Cemetery, N. and W. Shore Rds., and Hobart Hill and Groton Rds. 43°41′38″N 71°48′21″W	Hebron	
41	Hewitt House	Hewitt House	November 7, 1985 (#85002778)	U.S. Route 4; 43°38′41″N 72°08′37″W	Enfield	
42	Holderness Free Library	Holderness Free Library	March 7, 1985 (#85000478)	Junction of U.S. Route 3 and NH 113; 43°43′55″N 71°35′18″W	Holderness	
43	Holderness Inn	Holderness Inn	December 13, 1984 (#84000523)	U.S. Route 3; 43°43′53″N 71°35′24″W	Holderness	
44	Jeremiah Hutchins Tavern	Jeremiah Hutchins Tavern	September 7, 1984 (#84003194)	Northeast of Bath on U.S. Route 302; 44°10′41″N 71°56′40″W	Bath	
45	Moses Kent House	Moses Kent House	June 7, 1984 (#84002808)	River Road; 43°52′15″N 72°09′45″W	Lyme	Noted for murals by Rufus Porter
46	Edward H. Lane House	Edward H. Lane House	December 8, 1980 (#80000286)	16 Cottage St. 44°18′18″N 71°46′03″W	Littleton	
47	Lisbon Inn	Lisbon Inn	December 1, 1980 (#80000287)	Main St. 44°12′47″N 71°54′46″W	Lisbon	
48	Littleton Community House & Annex	Littleton Community House & Annex	December 26, 2023 (#100009661)	120 Main St. 44°18′27″N 71°46′29″W	Littleton	
49	Littleton Town Building	Littleton Town Building	May 7, 1973 (#73000164)	1 Union St. 44°18′21″N 71°46′12″W	Littleton	
50	Lovett's by Lafayette Brook	Lovett's by Lafayette Brook	March 11, 1982 (#82001676)	South of Franconia on Profile Rd. 44°12′16″N 71°43′25″W	Franconia	
51	Lower Intervale Grange #321	Lower Intervale Grange #321	September 29, 2022 (#100008224)	471 Daniel Webster Hwy. 43°43′25″N 71°40′34″W	Plymouth	Grange hall built in 1912, hardly changed.
52	Lyme Center Historic District	Lyme Center Historic District	March 31, 1987 (#86003381)	34-55 Dorchester Rd. 43°47′58″N 72°07′35″W	Lyme Center	
53	Lyme Common Historic District	Lyme Common Historic District	September 1, 1988 (#88001435)	Dorchester Rd., John Tomson Way, On the Common; Pleasant and Union Sts., E. Thetford Rd., Main and Market Sts. 43°48′40″N 72°09′28″W	Lyme	
54	Lyme–East Thetford Bridge	Lyme–East Thetford Bridge	March 27, 2020 (#100005159)	VT 113 / East Thetford Rd. over the Connecticut R. 43°48′44″N 72°10′59″W	Lyme	Extends into Orange County, Vermont
55	Minot–Sleeper Library	Minot–Sleeper Library	September 15, 1988 (#88001434)	35 Pleasant Street; 43°35′28″N 71°44′16″W	Bristol	
56	North Holderness Freewill Baptist Church–Holderness Historical Society Building	North Holderness Freewill Baptist Church–Holderness Historical Society Building	September 4, 1986 (#86002171)	Rt. 3; 43°43′56″N 71°35′10″W	Holderness	Listed on Owl Brook Road; moved to present location in 1994
57	Old Grafton County Courthouse	Old Grafton County Courthouse	April 29, 1982 (#82001677)	1 Court St. 43°45′29″N 71°41′21″W	Plymouth	
58	Orford Street Historic District	Orford Street Historic District	August 26, 1977 (#77000163)	Orford St. (NH 10) from NH 25A to Archertown Rd., including the cemetery to the east 43°54′16″N 72°08′07″W	Orford	
59	Owls Head	Owls Head	September 29, 2015 (#15000669)	289 W. Shore Rd. 43°40′43″N 71°47′23″W	Hebron	
60	Norman and Marion Perry House	Norman and Marion Perry House	September 25, 2012 (#12000821)	352 Ellsworth Hill Road; 43°51′18″N 71°41′46″W	Campton	c. 1960 Modernist house designed by Hugh Stebbins
61	Piermont Bridge	Piermont Bridge	June 6, 2001 (#01000630)	NH 25 over the Connecticut River at the Vermont state line 43°58′40″N 72°06′45″W	Piermont	Extends into Orange County, Vermont
62	Plymouth Historic District	Plymouth Historic District	March 14, 1986 (#86000343)	Bounded by Court, Main, and Highland Sts. 43°45′26″N 71°41′17″W	Plymouth	
63	Rocks Estate	Rocks Estate	September 7, 1984 (#84003197)	West of Bethlehem on U.S. Route 302; 44°16′52″N 71°44′03″W	Bethlehem	
64	Rockywold–Deephaven Camps	Rockywold–Deephaven Camps	June 14, 2013 (#13000382)	Pinehurst Rd. 43°46′35″N 71°32′36″W	Holderness	Part of the Squam MPS
65	The Samuel Morey Memorial Bridge	The Samuel Morey Memorial Bridge	December 8, 1997 (#97001523)	NH 25A over the Connecticut River; 43°54′25″N 72°08′23″W	Orford	Extends into Orange County, Vermont
66	Sawyer–Medlicott House	Sawyer–Medlicott House	December 6, 1991 (#91001757)	Junction of Bradford and River Rds. 43°58′40″N 72°06′21″W	Piermont	
67	Shepard Hill Historic District	Shepard Hill Historic District	October 8, 2014 (#14000843)	109, 135, 177, 180, 200 Shepard Hill, 6, 19, 31, 33, 35, 41 Coxboro & all of Asquam Rds., 584 US 3; 43°43′32″N 71°34′14″W	Holderness	
68	Sphinx Tomb	Sphinx Tomb	March 17, 2005 (#05000173)	Northeastern corner of the junction of E. Wheelock St. and Observatory Rd. 43°42′13″N 72°17′06″W	Hanover	
69	Spring Hill Farm	Spring Hill Farm	June 13, 2002 (#02000639)	263 Meriden Rd. 43°37′30″N 72°13′31″W	Lebanon	
70	St. Mark's Episcopal Church	St. Mark's Episcopal Church	December 13, 1984 (#84000522)	6-8 Highland St. 43°41′48″N 71°37′57″W	Ashland	
71	Stone Arch Underpass	Stone Arch Underpass	September 12, 1985 (#85002190)	Glen Rd. 43°38′03″N 72°18′21″W	Lebanon	
72	Swiftwater Covered Bridge	Swiftwater Covered Bridge	November 21, 1976 (#76000127)	South of Bath on Valley Rd. 44°08′03″N 71°57′05″W	Bath	Over the Wild Ammonoosuc River
73	Thayer's Hotel	Thayer's Hotel	March 9, 1982 (#82001678)	136 Main St. 44°18′23″N 71°46′28″W	Littleton	
74	Trinity Church	Trinity Church	September 7, 1984 (#84003203)	East of Plymouth on NH 175; 43°45′24″N 71°40′11″W	Holderness	
75	True Farm	True Farm	August 15, 2012 (#12000507)	53, 64, and 70 True Farm Rd., and 884 NH 113; 43°45′46″N 71°33′49″W	Holderness	Part of the Squam MPS
76	US Post Office and Courthouse–Littleton Main	US Post Office and Courthouse–Littleton Main	July 17, 1986 (#86002251)	134 Main St. 44°18′26″N 71°46′30″W	Littleton	
77	Watch Rock Camp		December 24, 2013 (#13000973)	Address restricted	Holderness	Part of the Squam MPS
78	Webster Estate	Webster Estate	June 9, 1989 (#89000448)	NH 113; 43°45′35″N 71°33′31″W	Holderness	
79	Whipple House	Whipple House	December 13, 1978 (#78000338)	4 Pleasant St. 43°41′40″N 71°37′54″W	Ashland	
80	Woodsville Opera Building	Woodsville Opera Building	May 15, 1980 (#80000288)	67 Central St. 44°09′08″N 72°02′18″W	Woodsville	

== See also ==
- List of National Historic Landmarks in New Hampshire
- National Register of Historic Places listings in New Hampshire
