= Central Square Historic District (Bristol, New Hampshire) =

Historic district in New Hampshire, United States

- U.S. National Register of Historic Places
- U.S. Historic district
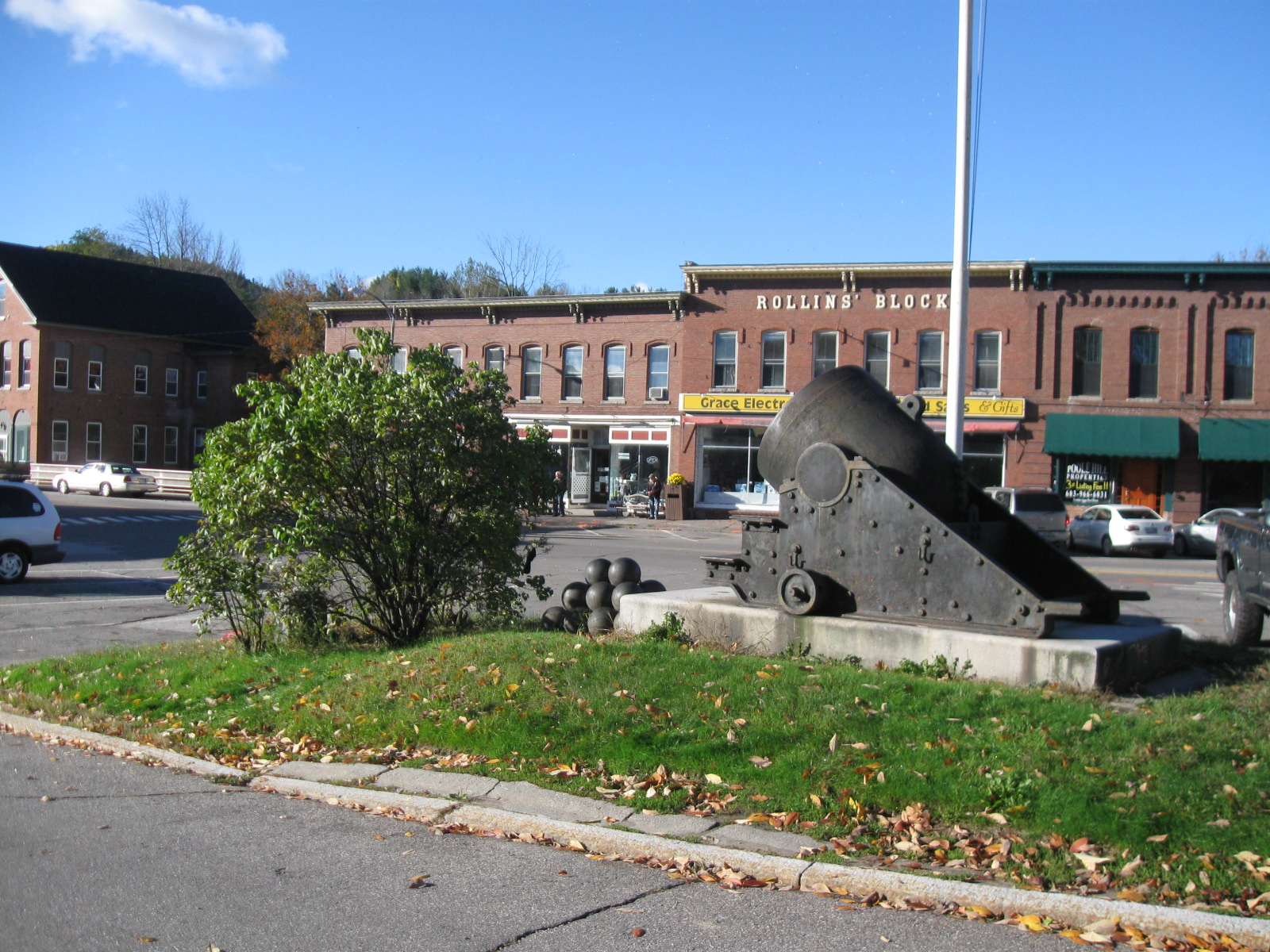
- October 2012

- Location within New Hampshire Location within the United States
- Location: 2-27 Central Square, 1 Summer St., 1-3 N. Main St., and 2 S. Main St., Bristol, New Hampshire
- Coordinates: 43°35′29″N 71°44′11″W
- Area: 3.7 acres (1.5 ha)
- Built: 1861
- Architect: Multiple
- Architectural style: Late Victorian, Federal
- NRHP reference No.: 83001139
- Added to NRHP: March 24, 1983

The Central Square Historic District of Bristol, New Hampshire, encompasses the central commercial district of the town. The square is a four-sided space near the junction of six roadways in the center of Bristol, just north of the Newfound River and west of the Pemigewasset River. The district includes all of the buildings that are arrayed around the square, as well as one contemporary commercial building located just south of the Newfound River on South Main Street. The district was listed on the National Register of Historic Places in 1983.

The center of Bristol began to take shape in the 1760s with the arrival of the first non-Native settlers. A road was cut along the Pemigewasset River, which crossed the Newfound River near where South Main Street does today. A mill was built a little way to the east. By the 1790s a small town center had emerged, including two tavern buildings that still stand. A new road (now North Main Street) to Newfound Lake in 1805 further enhanced the area's importance as a transportation junction, shortly followed by what is now Pleasant Street in 1808. How the square itself formed is uncertain, since there are no formal town documents discussing the matter.

The center grew in the 19th century with the arrival of industrial mills and the railroad. Most of the municipal functions were located away from the square, which developed as a commercial business district. Early surviving instances of wood frame commercial construction include in the 1841 Bean-Tukey Block and the 1848 Cass Block. The west side of the square was subjected to destructive fires in 1861 and 1871, resulting in the construction of Victorian brick blocks on that side of the square. The square's basic structures today are, with only few exceptions, what they were in the late 19th century.

== See also ==
- National Register of Historic Places listings in Grafton County, New Hampshire
