= Dorchester Community Church =

Historic church in New Hampshire, United States

- U.S. National Register of Historic Places
- U.S. Historic district – Contributing property
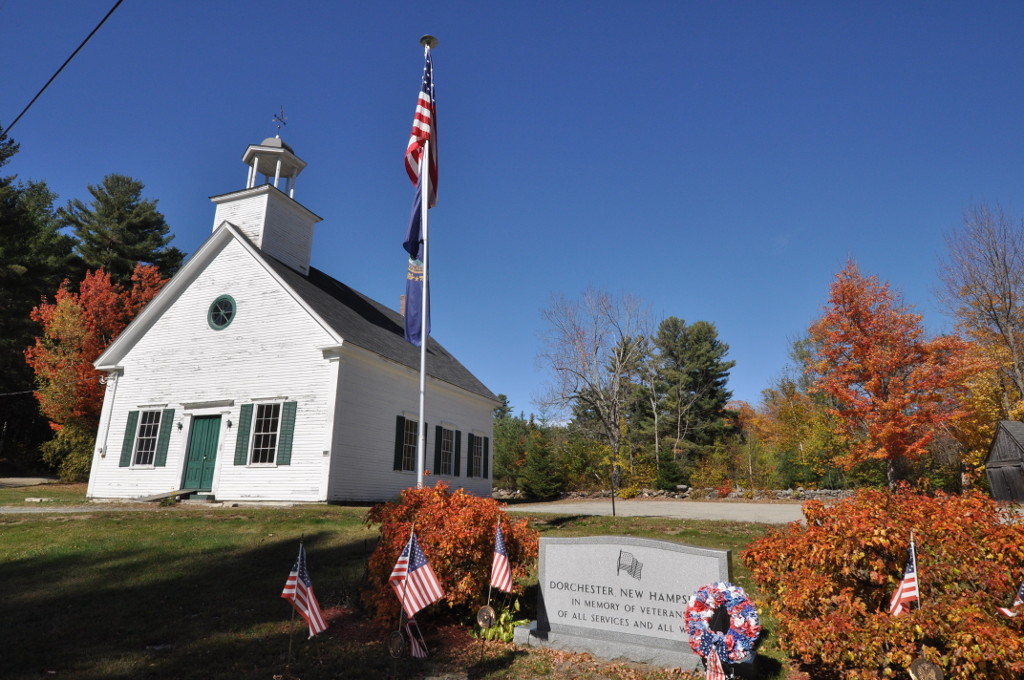

- Location within New Hampshire Location within the United States
- Location: Off NH 118, Dorchester, New Hampshire
- Coordinates: 43°45′25″N 71°57′1″W
- Area: 2 acres (0.81 ha)
- Built: 1828
- Part of: Dorchester Common Historic District (ID85000477)
- NRHP reference No.: 80000284

Significant dates
- Added to NRHP: November 25, 1980
- Designated CP: March 7, 1985

The Dorchester Community Church is a historic church building off NH 118 in Dorchester, New Hampshire. Built in 1828 and rebuilt on a smaller scale in 1883, it is a well-preserved local example of Greek Revival architecture. The church was listed on the National Register of Historic Places in 1980, and included in the Dorchester Common Historic District in 1985.

== Description and history ==
The Dorchester Community Church is located in the historic town center of the rural community, at the junction of North Dorchester and Town House Roads, a short way northwest of New Hampshire Route 118. It is set on the north side of a small green, alongside a district school and the 19th-century town hall. It is a single-story frame structure, with a gabled roof and clapboarded exterior. A tower rises above the roof, with a square first stage, and an open octagonal second stage, which is surmounted by a small dome and weathervane. The main facade is three bays wide, with pilastered corners. The main entrance is at the center, flanked by pilasters and topped by a corniced entablature. Windows are rectangular sash, with shutters on the sides and shallow projecting cornices above.

The vernacular Greek Revival church was built in 1828 on Thompson's Hill, and was originally known as the South Meetinghouse. With its enrollment in decline, the church was moved in 1883 to be adjacent to the town hall, at which time it was disassembled and rebuilt at a smaller scale. In 1940, funds were raised locally for the building's restoration and electrification. It is maintained by a community organization and continues to be used for services.

== See also ==
- National Register of Historic Places listings in Grafton County, New Hampshire
