= Ashland Town Hall =

- U.S. National Register of Historic Places
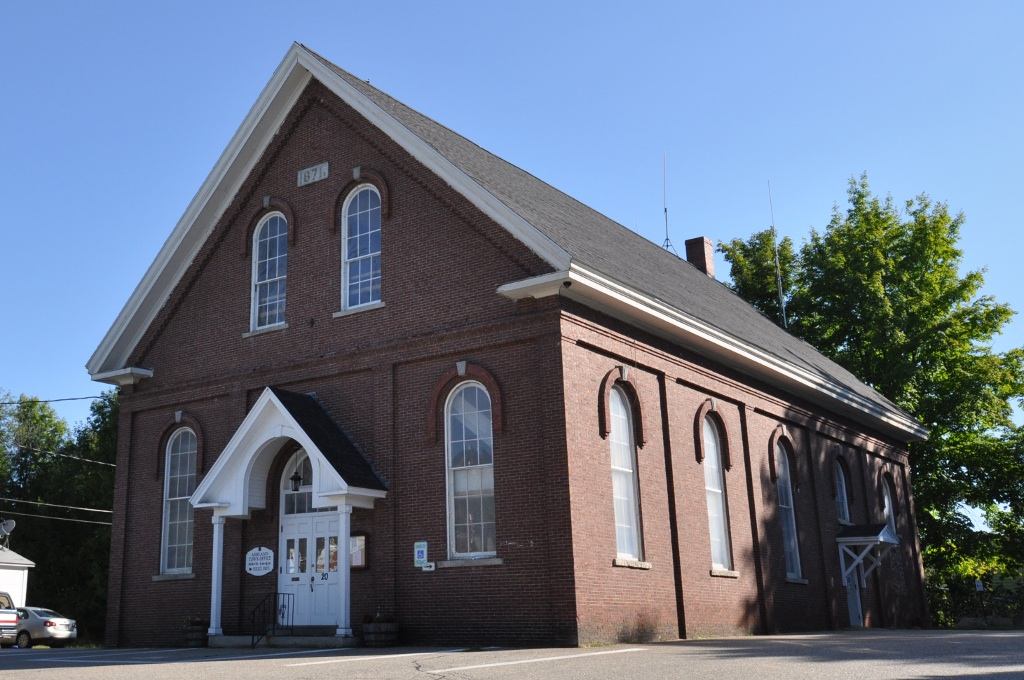

- Location within New Hampshire Location within the United States
- Location: 10 Highland St., Ashland, New Hampshire
- Coordinates: 43°41′48″N 71°37′57″W
- Area: 0.4 acres (0.16 ha)
- Built: 1871
- Built by: Jewell, John
- Architectural style: Late Victorian
- NRHP reference No.: 83001138
- Added to NRHP: March 24, 1983

Ashland Town Hall, at 10 Highland Street, is the town hall of Ashland, New Hampshire. Built in 1871, it is a distinctive Victorian interpretation of a typical New England town hall, which has served the town in civic roles (as both town hall and a school) since its construction. The building was listed on the National Register of Historic Places in 1983.

== Description and history ==
Ashland Town Hall is located on the north side of Highland Street, overlooking the town center to the south. The building is a distinctive Victorian interpretation of a typical New England town hall, with round-arch Italianate style windows, and transom and round-arch windows above the double doors that form the entry on the front facade. The porch that shelters the front entry is a later addition, although its arched surround is sympathetic to the building's other elements. The lower level of the interior, originally a large hall, has been extensively altered to provide space for an increasing number of town offices, while the upper level auditorium space is relatively little altered.

The hall was built in 1871, three years after Ashland separated from Holderness, which had retained its town hall. Prior to construction of this building, town meetings were held in a privately owned hall on this site, which burned in April 1871. The hall was used for town meetings and elections until 1950, when a larger facility was built across the street. From 1950 to 1970, the building was used by the local school district to house classrooms. It was returned to municipal functions in 1972, and now houses town offices.

== See also ==
- National Register of Historic Places listings in Grafton County, New Hampshire
