= Lisbon Inn =

- U.S. National Register of Historic Places
- The Moulton
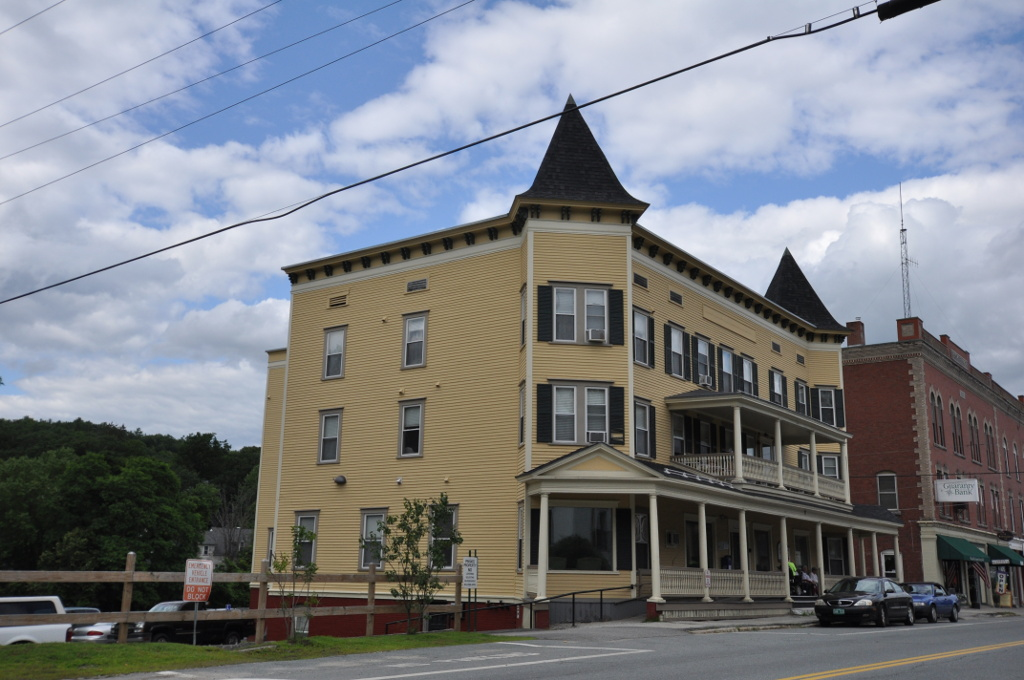

- Location within New Hampshire Location within the United States
- Location: 40 S Main St., Lisbon, New Hampshire
- Coordinates: 44°12′47.5″N 71°54′42.9″W
- Area: 1.5 acres (0.61 ha)
- Built: 1901 - 1903
- Built by: Herbert Moulton
- Architectural style: Queen Anne, Colonial Revival
- Restored: 1922
- Restored by: Ralph Olney
- NRHP reference No.: 80000287
- Added to NRHP: December 1, 1980

The Lisbon Inn, formerly The Moulton, is a historic former hotel building on United States Route 302 in Lisbon, New Hampshire. Located at the southern end of Lisbon's central business district, the 1901 three story wood-frame building is an imposing presence, with Queen Anne-style pyramidal roof turrets at the corners of the main facade. The front of the building has two stories of porches with Colonial Revival styling.

The building was listed on the National Register of Historic Places in 1980 for architecture as its area of significance.

== History of the site ==
The Lisbon Inn is built on the site of Brigham's Hotel, which was destroyed in the Great Fire of 1901. The fire started in a peg mill owned by James G. Moore on November 3, 1901, and it destroyed most of Lisbon's business district.

Herbert Moulton purchased the site for $10,000 and rebuilt a hotel after the fire of 1901. The new hotel was named "The Moulton", and opened in 1903. Several years later, Moulton sold the hotel to Edwin Morse. The hotel was lost to fire again in 1922 and rebuilt by Ralph Olney who built it up to become one of the most prominent small hotels in New Hampshire.

== Statement of significance ==
The Lisbon Inn is a key architectural component in Lisbon's central business district. The rectangular clapboard block with traditional two-tiered piazza employs both Queen Anne and Colonial Revival details. The resulting transitional style is an outstanding example of turn-of-the-[20th ]century vernacular architecture, and exemplifies the generally eclectic architectural fabric of the surrounding village. Because of its grand scale and prominent corner towers, the Inn provides an emphatic visual terminus to downtown Lisbon's commercial streetscape.

— North Country Historical Foundation, NRHP nomination for Lisbon Inn (Oct 29, 1980)

Gallery of Lisbon Inn
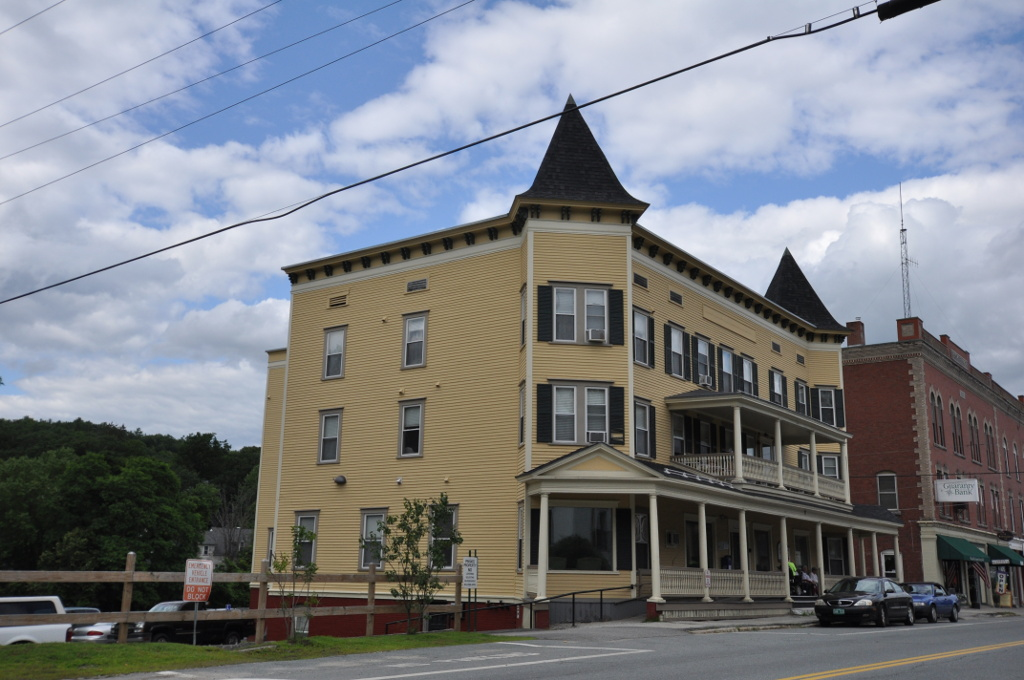
Lisbon Inn July 2015

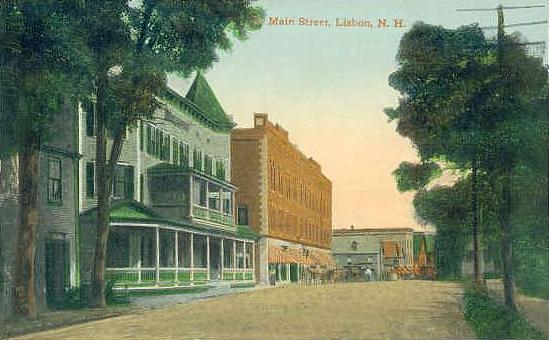
Postcard of Main St featuring Lisbon Inn circa 1910

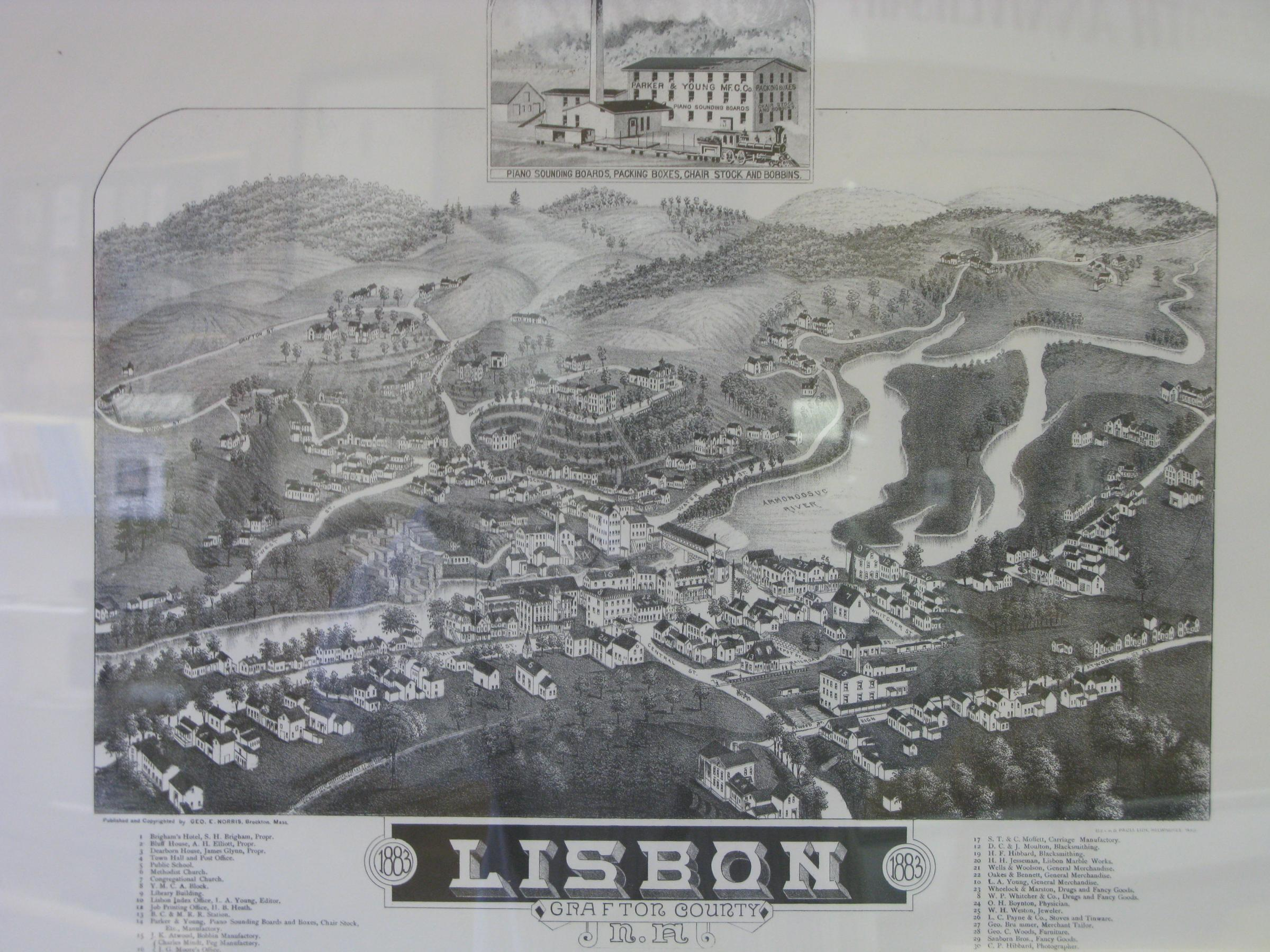
A map of Lisbon showing Brigham's Hotel before it was destroyed in the fire, circa 1883

== See also ==
- National Register of Historic Places listings in Grafton County, New Hampshire
