= Burt–Cheney Farm =

Historic farm in New Hampshire, US

- U.S. National Register of Historic Places
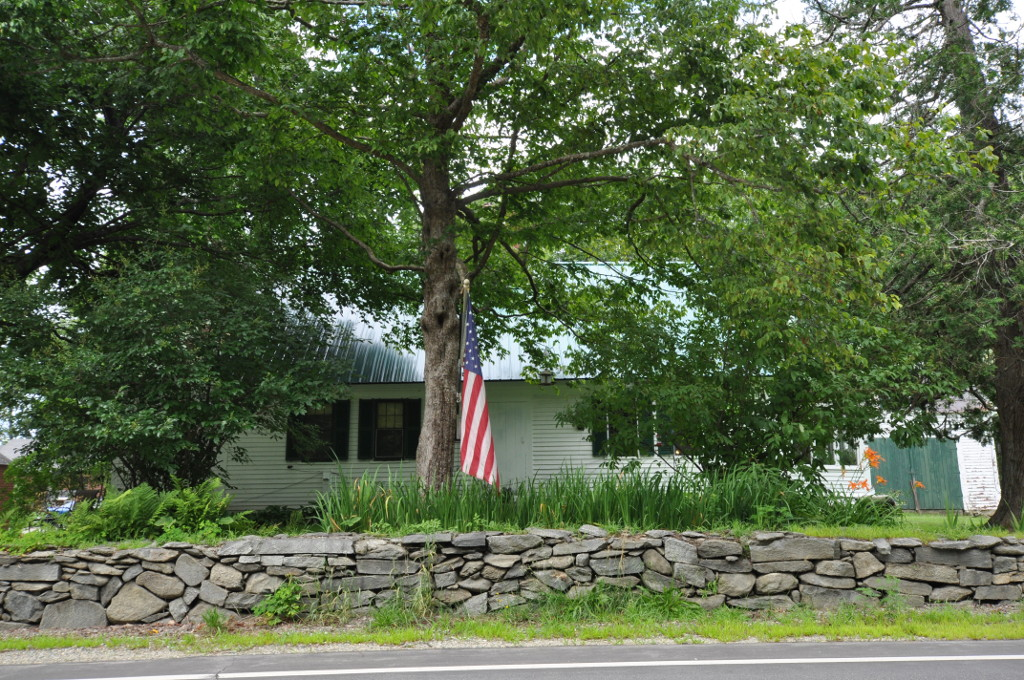

- Location within New Hampshire Location within the United States
- Location: US 302, Bethlehem, New Hampshire
- Coordinates: 44°17′33″N 71°45′24″W
- Area: 16.5 acres (6.7 ha)
- Built: 1817
- Built by: Burt, Simeon
- Architectural style: Cape Cod
- NRHP reference No.: 82001674
- Added to NRHP: March 25, 1982

The Burt–Cheney Farm is a historic farmstead on U.S. Route 302 in Bethlehem, New Hampshire. The main farm house, built in part about 1818, is a rare early Cape-style house, and is one of the oldest surviving buildings in the town. The property was listed on the National Register of Historic Places in 1982.

== Description and history ==
The Burt–Cheney Farm is located in a nominally rural setting in western Bethlehem, its setting interrupted by Interstate 93, which runs north and east of the farmstead, which stands on 16.5 acres (6.7 ha) on the north side of US 302 northwest of its interchange with the highway. A stone wall lines the property along the road, and there are several outbuildings in addition to the main house, some of which date to the earliest days of the farm's settlement. The house is a 1½-story wood-frame structure, with a central chimney, gabled roof, and clapboarded exterior. The main facade is five bays wide, with symmetrically arranged windows around a center entrance. The interior follows a typical central chimney plan, with a narrow entrance vestibule, parlors on either side of the chimney, and a series of smaller rooms to the rear. The house's timber framing is exposed, and walls are finished with wainscoting.

The oldest part of the house was built c. 1810 by Simeon Burt, one of the first settlers in the area. The building was expanded by Burt in 1817 to achieve the main block's present center-chimney appearance. It is believed to be the second-oldest house in town, and one of the best-preserved examples of an early rural farmstead in the region. The farmstead was separated from the bulk of its associated lands by the construction of Interstate 93.

== See also ==
- National Register of Historic Places listings in Grafton County, New Hampshire
