= Lovett's by Lafayette Brook =

- U.S. National Register of Historic Places
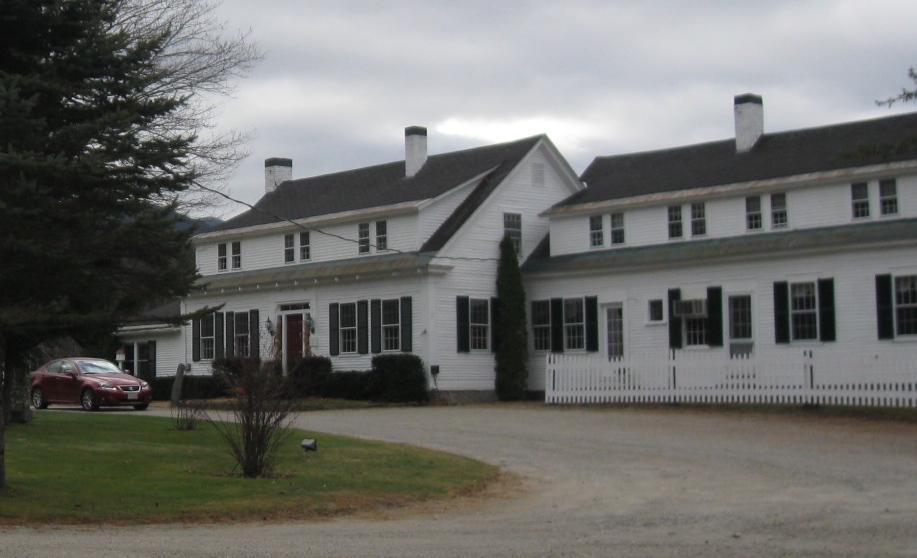

- Location within New Hampshire Location within the United States
- Location: 1474 Profile Rd., Franconia, New Hampshire
- Coordinates: 44°12′16″N 71°43′25″W
- Area: less than one acre
- Built: 1820
- Built by: Powers, Nicholas
- Architectural style: Cape
- NRHP reference No.: 82001676
- Added to NRHP: March 11, 1982

Lovett's by Lafayette Brook, or Lovett's Inn, is a historic farmstead and inn at 1474 Profile Road (New Hampshire Route 18) in Franconia, New Hampshire, United States. It is one of a few surviving early 20th century hostelries in the state, dating to a period when many large and more elaborate hotels stood that have succumbed to fire or demolition. It is located on the west side of Profile Road, in a rural area between the village center of Franconia and Cannon Mountain. The building was listed on the National Register of Historic Places in 1982. It continues to function as a small hotel with restaurant.

== Description and history ==
The structure is estimated to have been built around 1820 by Nicholas Powers, one of the first settlers of the area. It consists of a pair of 1 1/2 story Cape style buildings that have been joined, offset by about 12 feet (3.7 m). The main entrance is in the southern section, framed by sidelight and transom windows; there are secondary entrances on the north section's facade. It was originally a farmhouse, whose farm was by the late 19th century supplying fresh goods to the area's large resort hotels. It was itself converted for use as an inn in 1928, after fires devastated a number of the area hotels. Around that time, shed dormers were added to both sides of each roof line. Further additions in the 1950s-60s added more kitchen and dining space to the rear. The grounds include a number of guest cabins, as well as an old barn that has also been adapted for guest use.

== See also ==
- National Register of Historic Places listings in Grafton County, New Hampshire
