= Plymouth Historic District (Plymouth, New Hampshire) =

Historic district in New Hampshire, United States

- U.S. National Register of Historic Places
- U.S. Historic district
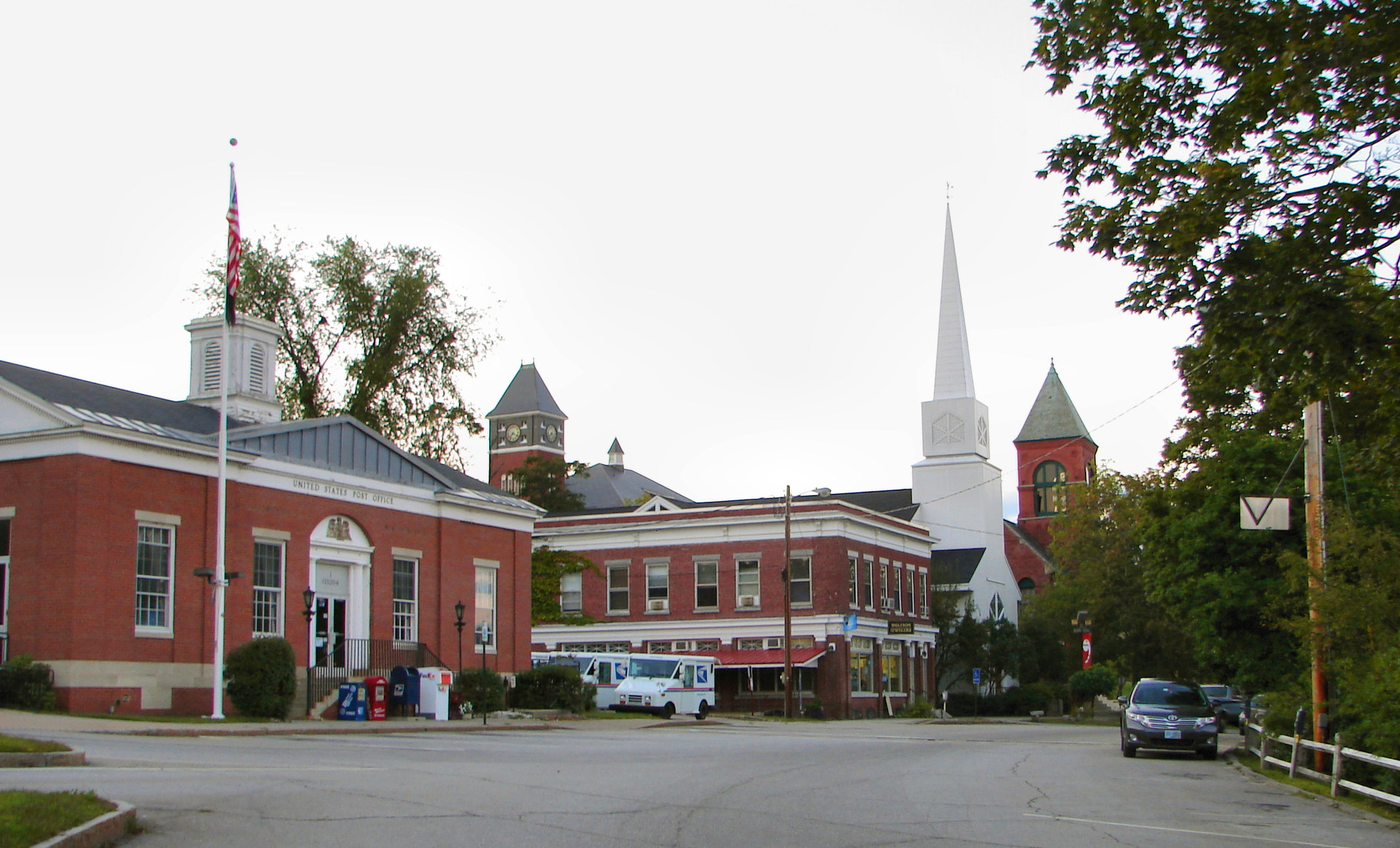
- US Post Office building and Pemigewasset National Bank building

- Location within New Hampshire Location within the United States
- Location: Bounded by Court, Main, and Highland Sts., Plymouth, New Hampshire, United States
- Coordinates: 43°45′26″N 71°41′17″W
- Area: 2 acres (0.81 ha)
- Architect: Damon Brothers
- Architectural style: Romanesque
- NRHP reference No.: 86000343
- Added to NRHP: March 14, 1986

The Plymouth Historic District encompasses a cluster of five civic buildings (of which four contribute to the district's significance) and the town common of Plymouth, New Hampshire, United States. The buildings are arrayed on the west side of Plymouth's town common, laid out not long after the town's settlement in 1763. The 2-acre (0.81 ha) district includes the town hall/court house, the Pemigewasset National Bank building, and the US Post Office building, as well as the Old Grafton County Courthouse (now a local history museum). The Plymouth Congregation Church also falls within the district bounds, but is not considered contributing. The district was listed on the National Register of Historic Places in 1986.

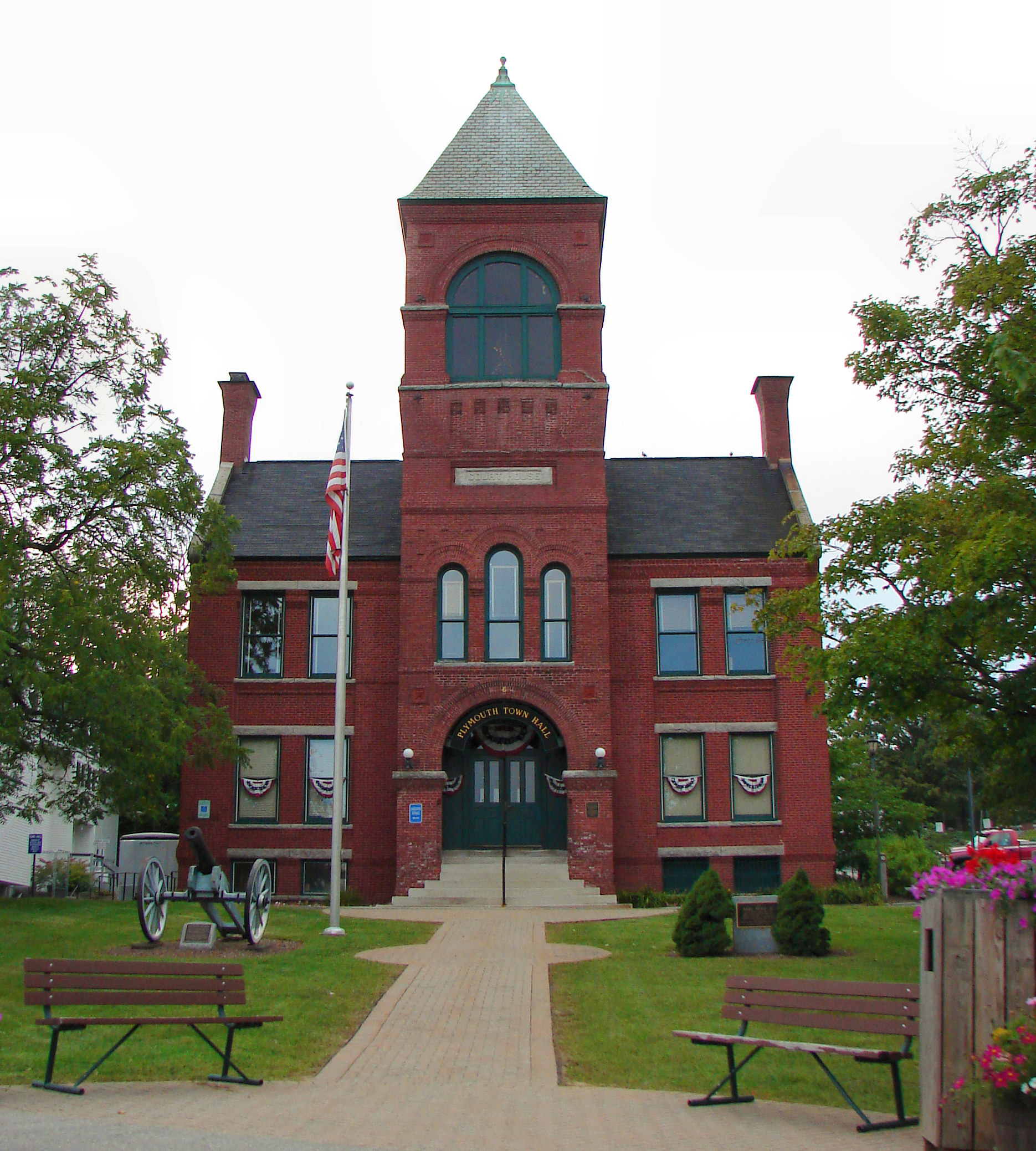
Plymouth Town Hall

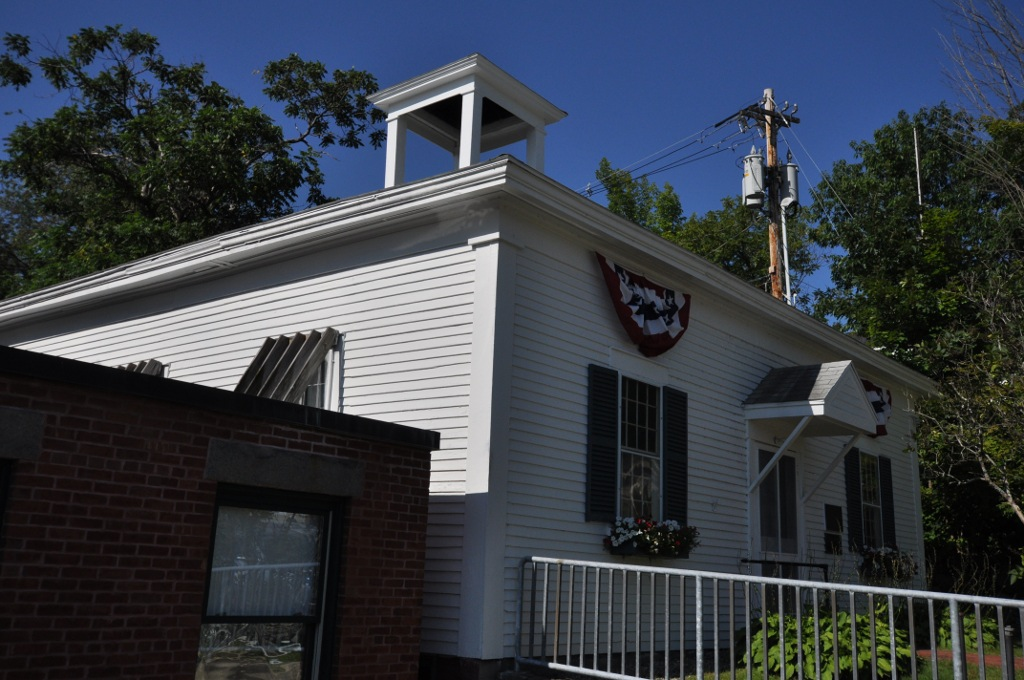
Old Grafton County Courthouse

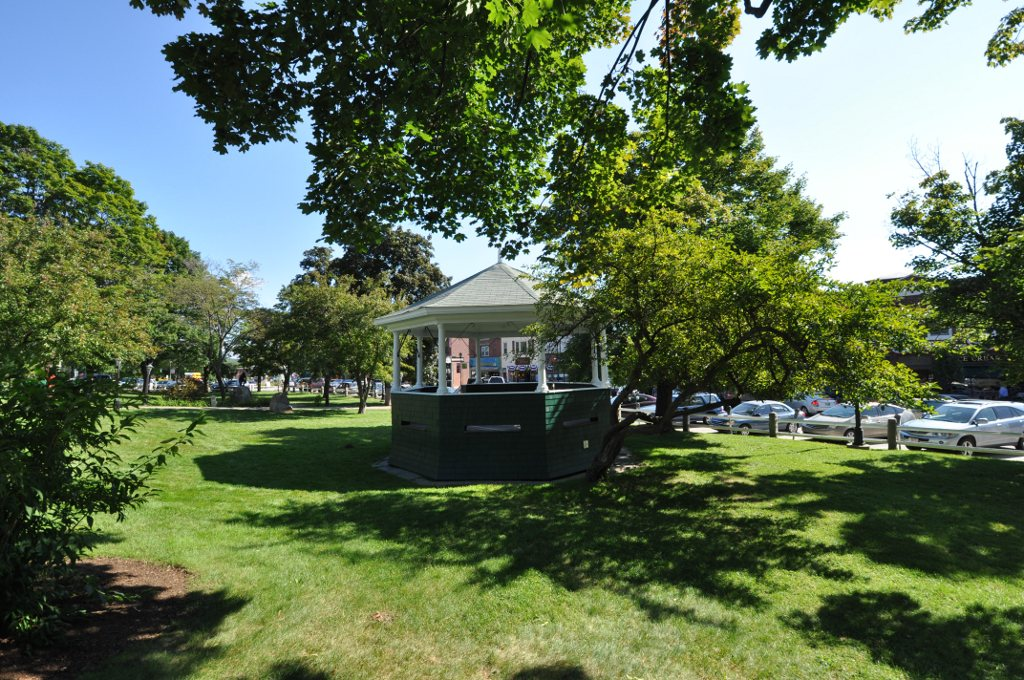
Plymouth Common

Plymouth was granted township status in 1763, with significant settlement not taking place until the 1770s. The town center is located on terraces on the west bank of the Pemigewasset River, with its commercial core extending along Main Street (United States Route 3). The town common is an oval bounded on the east by Main Street, where commercial buildings face it, and the west by Post Office Square, where the buildings of the historic district are arrayed. Its most prominent feature is a fountain, depicting a Boy Scout kneeling with cupped hands to hold water; it was designed by George Borst, a summertime resident of Plymouth, and placed in 1933. It was here that the town's first colonial meeting house was built, on whose site the 20th-century Congregational Church now stands. Just to its north stands Plymouth Town Hall, built in 1890 to a design by New Hampshire architect C. Willis Damon to also serve as a county courthouse. Adjacent to the town hall is the Old Grafton County Courthouse, one of the state's oldest civic buildings, built in 1774. South of the church stands the 1885 Pemigewasset National Bank building, still in use as a bank, and the 1936 post office.

== See also ==
- National Register of Historic Places listings in Grafton County, New Hampshire
