= Owls Head (Hebron, New Hampshire) =

Historic house in New Hampshire, United States

- U.S. National Register of Historic Places
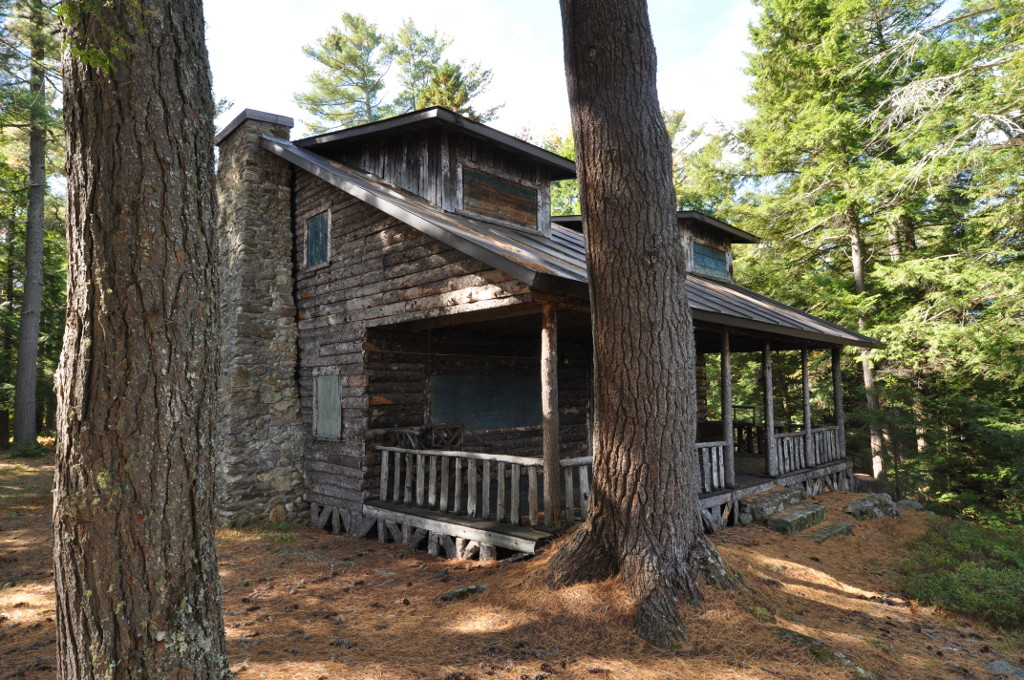

- Location within New Hampshire Location within the United States
- Location: 289 West Shore Road, Hebron, New Hampshire
- Coordinates: 43.67872°N 71.78959°W
- Built: 1927
- NRHP reference No.: 15000669
- Added to NRHP: September 29, 2015

Owls Head is an historic log cabin located on the shore of Newfound Lake in Hebron, New Hampshire. Built in 1927, it was added to the National Register of Historic Places in 2015.

== See also ==
- National Register of Historic Places listings in Grafton County, New Hampshire
