= Bristol Town Hall =

- U.S. National Register of Historic Places
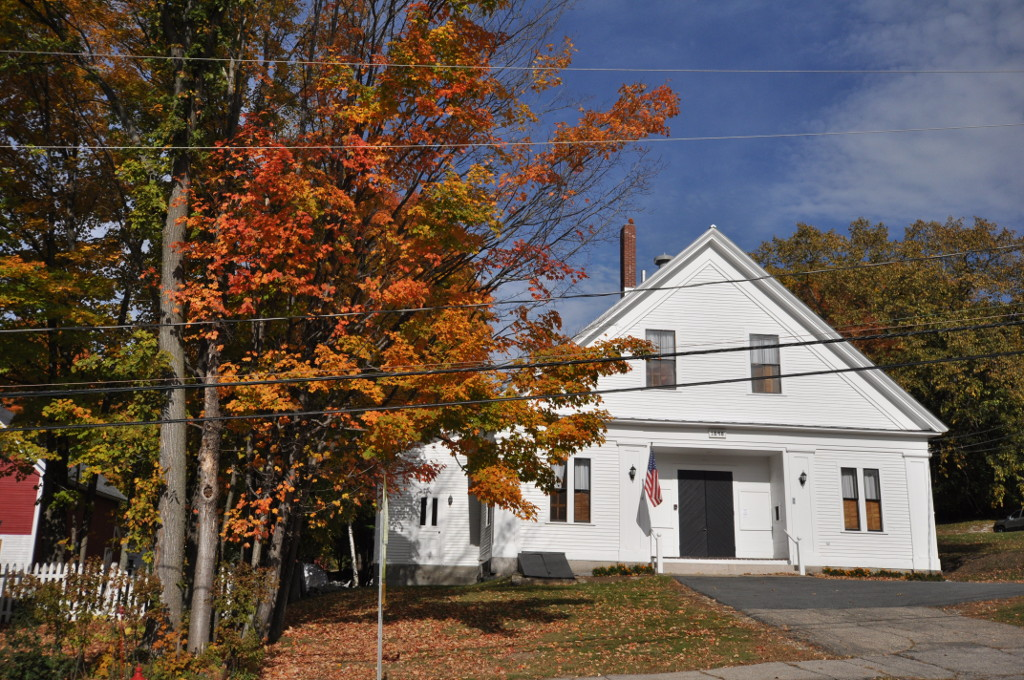

- Location within New Hampshire Location within the United States
- Location: 45 Summer St., Bristol, New Hampshire
- Coordinates: 43°35′33″N 71°44′8″W
- Area: less than one acre
- Built: 1849
- Architectural style: Greek Revival
- NRHP reference No.: 15000668
- Added to NRHP: September 29, 2015

Bristol Town Hall, at 45 Summer Street, is the town hall of Bristol, New Hampshire. It is a single story Greek Revival structure, built in 1849, and was the town's first purpose-built town hall. It continues to serve as a municipal meeting and polling place, although town offices are now in a building about a block away at 5 School Street. The building was listed on the National Register of Historic Places in 2015.

== Description and history ==
Bristol Town Hall is located on the fringe of the town's central downtown area, on the north side of Summer Street just east of School Street. It is a single-story wood-frame structure, with a front-facing gabled roof and clapboarded exterior. The front facade is three bays wide, the bays articulated by wide paneled pilasters. The center bay houses the building entrance in the center of a wide recess, and the flanking bays house paired slender sash windows. The pilasters rise to an entablature beneath the fully pedimented gable.

The town of Bristol was incorporated in 1819 out of portions of neighboring towns. Its early town meetings were held in schools and the local Methodist church. Discussions began 1841 for the construction of a dedicated town meeting hall, which came to fruition with the construction of this hall in 1849. The building was enlarged in 1872, by adding 20 feet (6.1 m) to the rear, in order to add a stage. In addition to being used for town meetings, the hall hosted theatrical productions, social events, and the meetings of local fraternal societies. The building is distinctive in the state as a late example of Greek Revival architecture, and is a relatively modestly scaled town hall for the period when it was built.

== See also ==
- National Register of Historic Places listings in Grafton County, New Hampshire
