= Lyme Common Historic District =

Historic district in New Hampshire, United States

- U.S. National Register of Historic Places
- U.S. Historic district
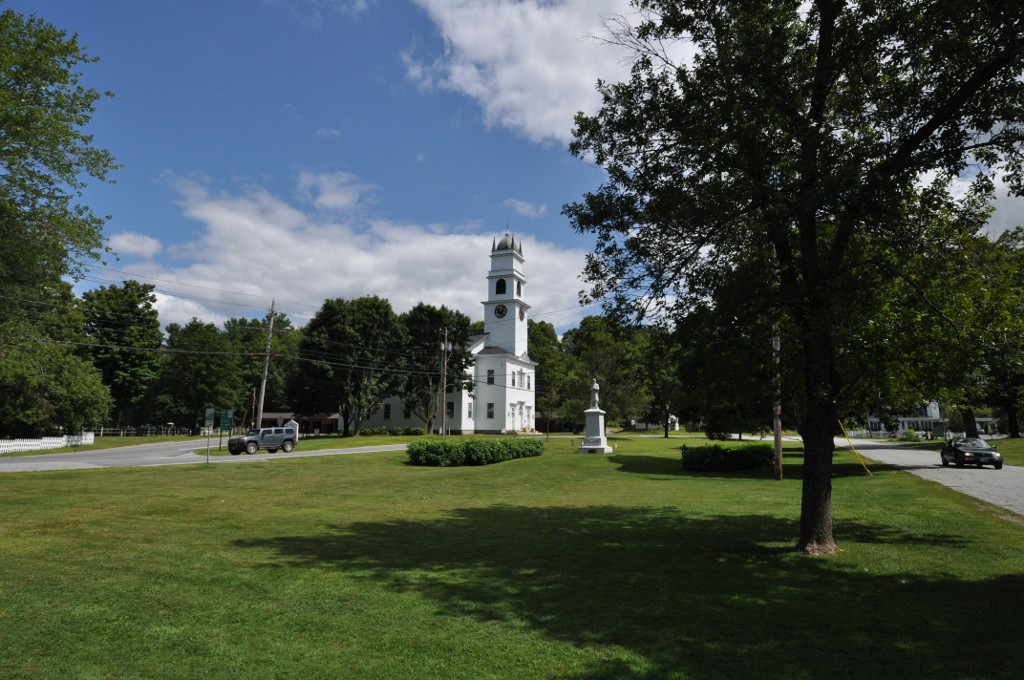
- Common with Congregational Church

- Location within New Hampshire Location within the United States
- Location: Dorchester Rd., John Tomson Way, On the Common; Pleasant and Union Sts., E. Thetford Rd., Main and Market Sts., Lyme, New Hampshire
- Area: 80 acres (32 ha)
- Architect: Multiple
- Architectural style: Greek Revival, Federal
- NRHP reference No.: 88001435
- Added to NRHP: September 1, 1988

The Lyme Common Historic District encompasses the original historic center of Lyme, New Hampshire, United States. Established in 1781, it includes sixty historic buildings surrounding the town common and along surrounding roads, and is a well-preserved example of a 19th-century village center. The district was listed on the National Register of Historic Places in 1988.

== Description and history ==
The centerpiece of the 80-acre (32 ha) district is the oblong town common, a flat, grassy expanse extending east-west just south of a bend in Main Street (New Hampshire Route 10), whose visual anchor, the First Congregational Church, stands at the eastern end. The district extends along NH 10 north as far as High Street, and south a short distance beyond the common area.

The common area only began to take shape in 1781, after a meeting house (now the Nichols Store) was built in 1781. The presence of the meeting house meant that the village (then known as "Lyme Plain") would be of greater civic importance than Lyme Center, located 2 miles (3 km) to the east, nearer the town's geographic center. Layout of the common was followed by the construction of a significant number of Federal and Greek Revival houses between 1790 and about 1820. The First Congregational Church was built c. 1810, at which time the horse sheds behind it were also built; these are believed to be the longest such surviving row in the state. The other major building boom in the area was in 1840-65, the years preceding the Civil War. There are some 20th century Colonial Revival structures, and later new construction (and replacement of old) has generally been sympathetic to the extant styles.

== See also ==
- Lyme Center Historic District
- National Register of Historic Places listings in Grafton County, New Hampshire
