= First Free Will Baptist Church and Vestry =

Historic church in New Hampshire, United States

- U.S. National Register of Historic Places
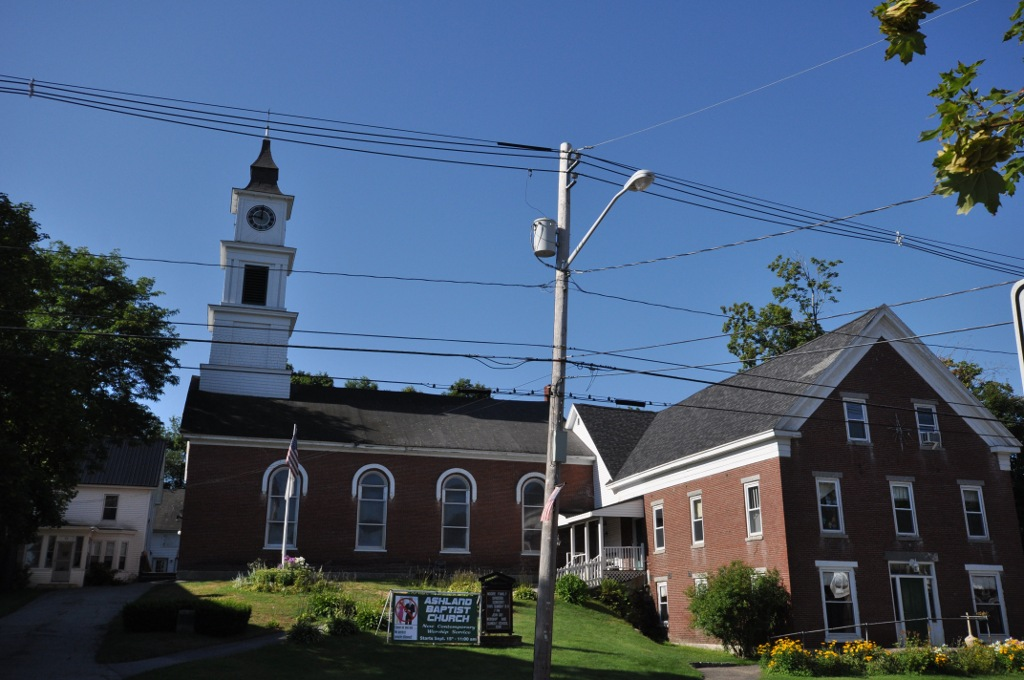

- Location within New Hampshire Location within the United States
- Location: 57 Main St., Ashland, New Hampshire
- Coordinates: 43°41′42″N 71°37′59″W
- Area: less than one acre
- Built: 1834
- Architectural style: Late Victorian
- NRHP reference No.: 83001140
- Added to NRHP: April 8, 1983

The First Free Will Baptist Church (also known Miss Perkins' High School and Holderness Academy) are a historic Free Will Baptist Church complex in Ashland, New Hampshire. The complex consists of three buildings: the brick church building, which was built in 1834; the old vestry, a brick building standing near the street which was built c. 1835 as a school and converted to a vestry in 1878; and the new vestry, a wooden structure added in 1899 to join the two brick buildings together. The church, a fine vernacular Federal style building when it was built, had its interior extensively restyled in the late 19th and early 20th centuries. The complex was listed on the National Register of Historic Places in 1983, primarily as a good example of modest Victorian church architecture. It now houses the Ashland Community Church.

== Description and history ==
The First Free Will Baptist Church stands in the village of Ashland, on the south side of Main Street (United States Route 3) between Water and Pleasant Streets. The church, a single-story brick building, stands atop a knoll that overlooks the center of the village. It is covered by a gabled roof oriented with the ridge parallel to the street, with a steepled tower and main entrance at the eastern end. The old vestry is a 2-1/2 story brick building, whose gabled roof is placed gable-end to the street. It has a three-bay facade with the entrance at the center, framed by sidelight and transom windows. The new vestry is built against the rears of these two buildings.

A Free Will Baptist congregation was established in what is today Ashland in 1818, when it was still part of Holderness. By 1830, the congregation had grown large enough to warrant a dedicated sanctuary, which was built in 1834. Details of its original form are sketchy, because it underwent a series of alterations to both its exterior and interior between 1872 and 1915. These rendered the building into one that is essentially entirely Late Victorian in character, with arched stained glass windows, shingling in the tower stages, and other features reflective of that period. The old vestry was built about 1835, and is typical of period academy buildings. This one was used to house a school and the vestry, the latter use in exchange for its siting on church-owned land. The academy building was purchased outright by the church in 1878, and the new vestry building was added in 1899.

== See also ==
- National Register of Historic Places listings in Grafton County, New Hampshire
