= Old Grafton County Courthouse =

- U.S. National Register of Historic Places
- U.S. Historic district – Contributing property
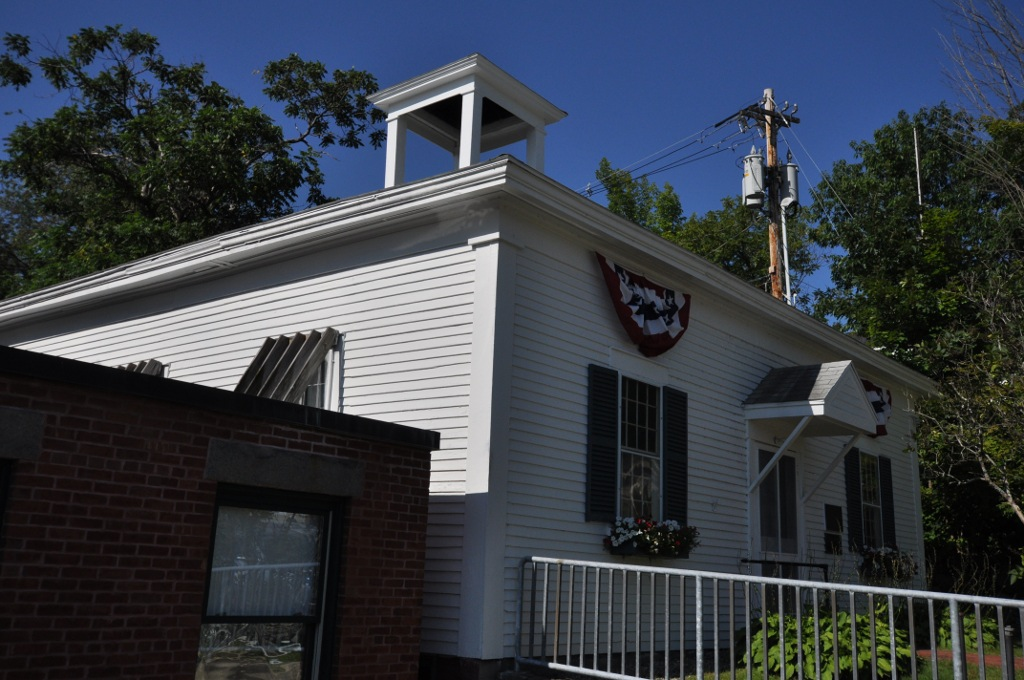

- Location within New Hampshire Location within the United States
- Interactive map showing the location of Old Graffin County Courthouse
- Location: 1 Court St., Plymouth, New Hampshire
- Coordinates: 43°45′29″N 71°41′21″W
- Area: 0.2 acres (0.081 ha)
- Built: 1774
- Part of: Plymouth Historic District (ID86000343)
- NRHP reference No.: 82001677

Significant dates
- Added to NRHP: April 29, 1982
- Designated CP: March 14, 1986

The Old Grafton County Courthouse is a historic courthouse building at 1 Court Street in Plymouth, New Hampshire. This modest wood-frame building was built in 1774 to serve as one of two courthouses for Grafton County, which had just been established; it is one of the oldest surviving civic structures in the state. It is now the museum of the Plymouth Historical Society. The building was listed on the National Register of Historic Places in 1982, and included in the Plymouth Historic District in 1986.

== Description and history ==
The Old Grafton County Courthouse stands in the town center of Plymouth, on the south side of Court Street just west of the town hall. It is a square wood-frame structure, 34 feet (10 m) on each side, with a truncated hip roof topped by a cupola. The open cupola has square posts at the corners, and is covered by a low-pitch hip roof. The main facade of the building faces north, and is three bays wide, with sash windows flanking the main entrance. The entrance is sheltered by a gabled hood supported by simple triangular bracketing. A small ell projects from the rear of the building. The interior of the building consists of a single large chamber, whose styling is reflective of 1876 alterations.

The courthouse was built in 1774, shortly after Grafton County was established, and Plymouth was named one of its shire towns. It was described at the time of its construction as having "a stately cupola out of proportion to the diminutive size of the structure". After a new courthouse was built in 1823, the building was sold and moved to the outskirts of Plymouth, and used as a wheelwright's shop, undergoing significant alteration to accommodate that function. In 1876 the building was acquired by Henry W. Blair, who sought to preserve the historic building. He had it moved it to its present location and adapted for use as a library, which was managed by the local Young Ladies' Library Association. The cupola, lost during its use as a shop, was added back sometime before 1906. The building is now home to the Plymouth Historical Society.

== See also ==
- National Register of Historic Places listings in Grafton County, New Hampshire
