= Ashland Junior High School =

- U.S. National Register of Historic Places
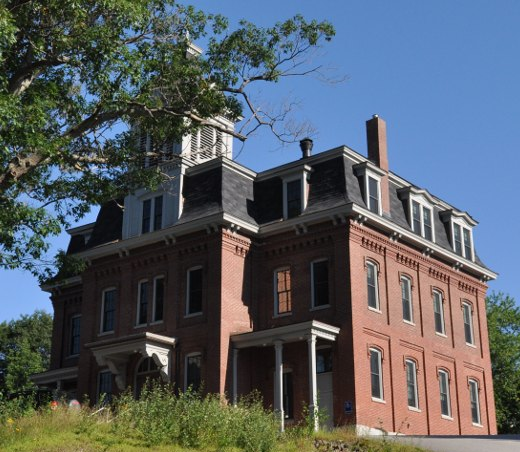
- Ashland Junior High School in 2013

- Location within New Hampshire Location within the United States
- Location: 41 School St., Ashland, New Hampshire
- Coordinates: 43°41′47″N 71°38′03″W
- Area: 0.3 acres (0.12 ha)
- Built: 1877
- Architectural style: Second Empire
- NRHP reference No.: 83001137
- Added to NRHP: April 8, 1983

The Ashland Junior High School is a historic former school building at 41 School Street in Ashland, New Hampshire. Built in 1877–78, it is an excellent example of Second Empire architecture, although its architect is unknown. It served as a school until 1990, and now houses community organizations. The building was listed on the National Register of Historic Places in 1983.

== Description and history ==
The former Ashland Junior High School stands on a rise overlooking Ashland's village center, on the north side of School Street just east of the entrance to the modern Ashland Elementary School. It is a three-story brick building, topped by a mansard roof. Its basic plan is somewhat typical for institutional Second Empire buildings: it is roughly square, with a three-bay facade, a central projecting pavilion, and a tower, in this case a wooden structure with a belfry. Windows are set in segmented-arch openings, which are themselves typically set in slightly recessed panels with brick corbelling at the top. The exterior is little changed from its original construction, although the interior has been subjected to period modernizations.

The school was built in 1877–78, in response to school administration complaints about the poor conditions in the extant village schools. It cost US$11,200 (equivalent to $373,655 in 2025) to build, running over its $10,000 appropriation. The school was closed in 1990, and the town voted to demolish it in 2000. A community effort rescued the building from that fate, and it has been rehabilitated for use by community organizations.

== See also ==
- National Register of Historic Places listings in Grafton County, New Hampshire
