= Lyme Center Historic District =

Historic district in New Hampshire, United States

- U.S. National Register of Historic Places
- U.S. Historic district
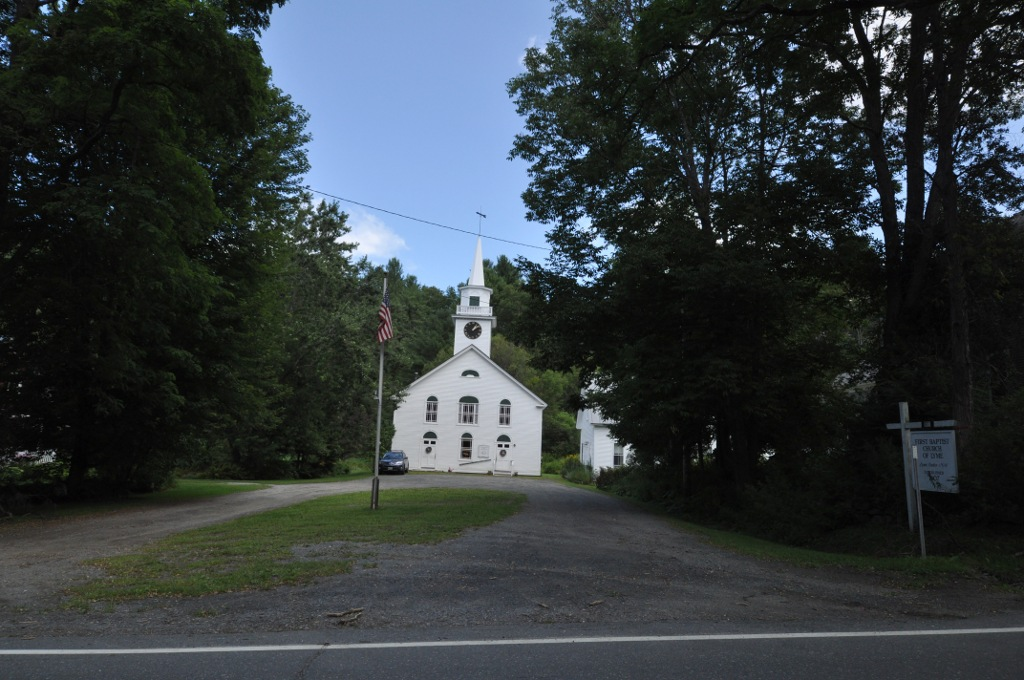
- First Baptist Church

- Location within New Hampshire Location within the United States
- Location: 34-55 Dorchester Rd., Lyme, New Hampshire
- Coordinates: 43.79937°N 72.12539°W
- Area: 14 acres (5.7 ha)
- Architectural style: Greek Revival
- NRHP reference No.: 86003381
- Added to NRHP: March 31, 1987

The Lyme Center Historic District encompasses a modest crossroads and industrial village in rural Lyme, New Hampshire. The predominantly residential district stretches along Dorchester Road, on either side of its junction with Baker Hill Road. The village's rise in development started in the early 19th century as it was at a crossroads of the east-west Dorchester Road, and the north-south Baker Hill Road and Acorn Hill Road. The village grew rapidly in the 1820s, with a number of simple Greek Revival houses, and in 1830 the Baptist Church was built. The other major civic building in the village is the Lyme Academy, built in 1839, albeit with more Federal than Greek Revival styling. Grant Brook, which runs parallel to Dorchester Road, provided a source of power for the growth of small industrial efforts, including a sawmill (of which only foundations remain) at the corner of Dorchester and Baker Hill Roads. This industry provided a second minor building boom in the late 19th to early 20th century. Most of the houses in the district are vernacular Greek Revival or Cape in their styling; probably the most elaborate Greek Revival house is the 1857 Beal-Pike House at 41 Dorchester Road.

Lyme Center was one of two village centers established in the town's early years, with Lyme Common taking a leading role as the site of its civic and religious buildings. Lyme Center was in the early years known as Cook Village, after James Cook, who first settled the area in 1783, and whose family dominated its population into the 1820s. Cook owned and operated the early saw and grist mills in the area, and controlled development of the area until his death in 1814. Cook's son established the village's first tavern, serving travelers on passing stagecoaches. The district was listed on the National Register of Historic Places in 1987.

== See also ==
- Lyme Center, New Hampshire
- Lyme Common Historic District
- National Register of Historic Places listings in Grafton County, New Hampshire
