= Orford Street Historic District =

Historic district in New Hampshire, United States

- U.S. National Register of Historic Places
- U.S. Historic district
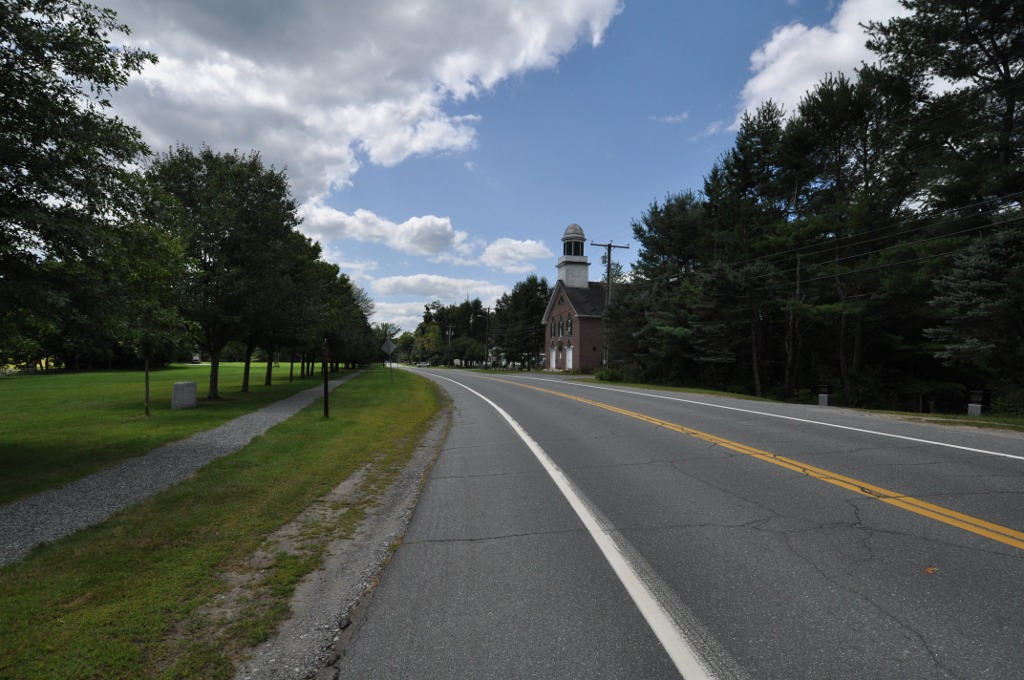
- Promenade on the left, Masonic Hall in the distance on the right

- Location within New Hampshire Location within the United States
- Location: Orford St. (NH 10) from Rt. 25A to Archertown Rd., E to include cemetery, Orford, New Hampshire
- Coordinates: 43.904444°N 72.135278°W
- Area: 43.2 acres (17.5 ha)
- Architect: Multiple
- Architectural style: Greek Revival, Late Victorian, Federal
- NRHP reference No.: 77000163
- Added to NRHP: August 26, 1977

The Orford Street Historic District encompasses a particularly attractive stretch of Orford Street (New Hampshire Route 10) in Orford, New Hampshire. It was described as early as the 18th century as "the most charming country village", with a tree-lined promenade that is still a focus of the town center. The district consists of about 0.5 miles (0.80 km) of Orford Street, between its junctions with New Hampshire Route 25A and Archertown Road, and was listed on the National Register of Historic Places in 1977.

The west side of Orford Street lies between the street and the Connecticut River, and is lined with a series of 18th and 19th century residential and civic buildings. Prominent among them are a series of Federal-style houses, built between 1773 and 1839, along what is called The Ridge. These houses exhibit the influence of architect Asher Benjamin, who is believed to have designed one of them. Other properties in the district include the brick Masonic hall (1840, formerly a Universalist church), the Gothic Revival Orford Congregational Church (1850), and the 1851 academy. Near the southern end of the district stands its only surviving commercial building, at the southwest corner of Bridge Street. The east side of Orford Street is dominated by a large common with tree-lined promenade. The promenade consists of a now-paved lane flanked on either side by mature trees, and was first laid out about 1800. At the northernmost end of the district, just east of the promenade, is the town cemetery, established in 1773 on land donated by Israel Morey.

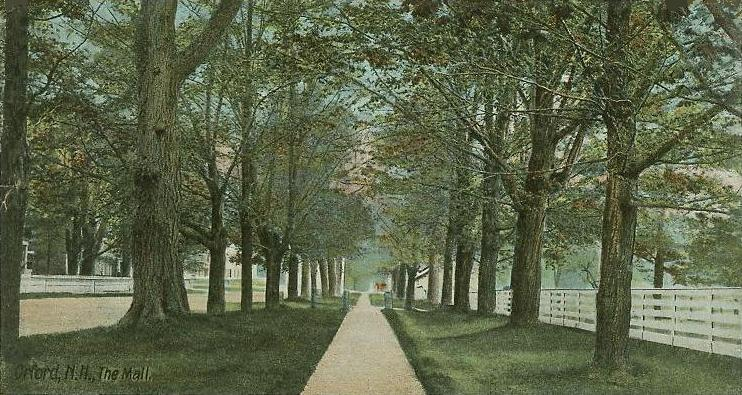
Postcard view of the mall, 1907

== See also ==
- National Register of Historic Places listings in Grafton County, New Hampshire
