= Colburn Park Historic District =

Historic district in New Hampshire, United States

- U.S. National Register of Historic Places
- U.S. Historic district
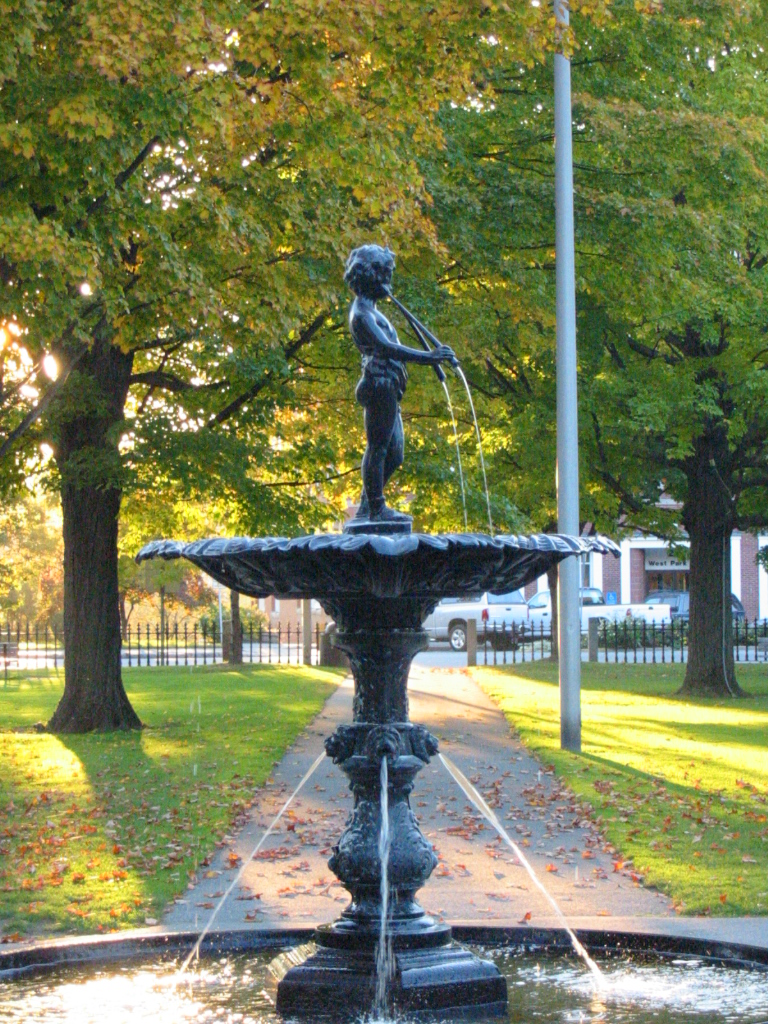
- Colburn Park

- Location within New Hampshire Location within the United States
- Location: N., S., E., and W. Park Sts., 3 Campbell St., 1 School St., 1 Bank St., and 9-10 Lebanon Mall, Lebanon, New Hampshire
- Coordinates: 43°38′31″N 72°15′8″W
- Area: 12 acres (4.9 ha)
- Built: 1792
- Architect: Multiple, including Ammi Young
- Architectural style: Chicago, Colonial Revival, Queen Anne
- NRHP reference No.: 86000782 (original); 100012049 (increase)

Significant dates
- Added to NRHP: January 10, 1986
- Boundary increase: July 31, 2025

The Colburn Park Historic District encompasses the heart of Lebanon, New Hampshire. It consists of Colburn Park, a large rectangular park in the center of the city, the buildings that are arrayed around it, and several 19th-century buildings that are immediately adjacent to those. The district covers 12 acres (4.9 ha), and was listed on the National Register of Historic Places in 1986.

Colburn Park is located a short way south and east of the Mascoma River, whose generally east–west route is interrupted by a semicircular bend to the north, within which lies the center of Lebanon. The park's origin is in 1792, when the land was donated by Robert Colburn as the site of the community's meeting house (church and town hall). Arterial roads were built to the area, and it began to develop as a commercial and civic center in the early 19th century. The Greek Revival First Congregational Church, designed by Ammi Burnham Young, was built in 1828, and a few early houses survive. The meeting house was moved in 1849 to the present location of City Hall.

Lebanon's central business district was struck by devastating fire in 1887, in which more than 80 buildings were destroyed. This did not directly affect the area around the park, but Lebanon's population continued to grow, and the business district expanded, resulting in the relocation of houses around the park, and the construction of a number of Victorian buildings around its perimeter. After the 1923 destruction by fire of the town hall, the area acquired a somewhat unified late-19th to early-20th century commercial and civic architecture.

== See also ==
- National Register of Historic Places listings in Grafton County, New Hampshire
