= Dorchester Common Historic District =

Historic district in New Hampshire, United States

- U.S. National Register of Historic Places
- U.S. Historic district
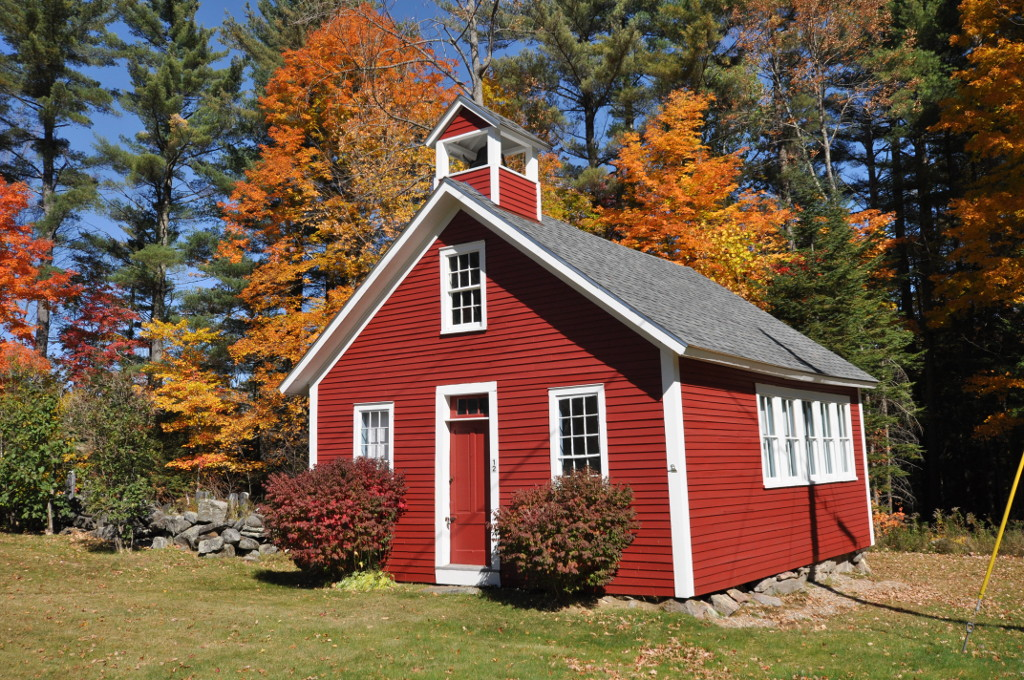
- Schoolhouse

- Location within New Hampshire Location within the United States
- Location: Roughly bounded by N. Dorchester 0.2 miles (0.32 km) NW of intersection with NH 118, Dorchester, New Hampshire
- Coordinates: 43°45′25″N 71°56′59″W
- Area: 1 acre (0.40 ha)
- Architect: Multiple
- NRHP reference No.: 85000477
- Added to NRHP: March 7, 1985

The Dorchester Common Historic District encompasses three public buildings that front the public common in the village of Dorchester, New Hampshire (it does not include the common itself). The oldest of the three buildings is the schoolhouse, which dates to 1808 and is now a local museum. The Dorchester Community Church was built in 1828, and the (now former) town hall in 1844, on the site of the town's first (1828) town hall. The district was listed on the National Register of Historic Places in 1985; the church was also separately listed in 1980.

== Church ==
The Dorchester Community Church is a single-story frame structure, with a gabled roof and clapboarded exterior. It has a square tower topped by a hexagonal cupola. The building was built in 1828, in the Thompson Hill area of southern Dorchester. Seeing declining participation, in 1883 it was disassembled and rebuilt at this location, with a slightly reduced size. In the 1940s, a local family donated funds for the building to be electrified.

== Town hall ==
The former town hall is a single-story frame structure, with a gabled roof, clapboarded exterior, and granite foundation. The front-facing gable is fully pedimented, with a half-oval fan at the center. The main entrance is at the center, with a double-leaf doorway topped by another half-oval fan and flanked by pilasters. The bays on either side of the door have sash windows. Additions are attached to the left and rear of the building. The interior was originally fitted with a pulpit, which was removed when the local Grange chapter installed a stage in its place in the early 20th century.

== School ==
The schoolhouse is a small single-story frame structure, with a gabled roof and clapboarded exterior. The roof is capped by a small square belfry. The main facade has a single entry flanked by sash windows, with a third sash window in the gable above.

== See also ==
- National Register of Historic Places listings in Grafton County, New Hampshire
