= Spring Hill Farm (Lebanon, New Hampshire) =

Historic house in New Hampshire, United States

- U.S. National Register of Historic Places
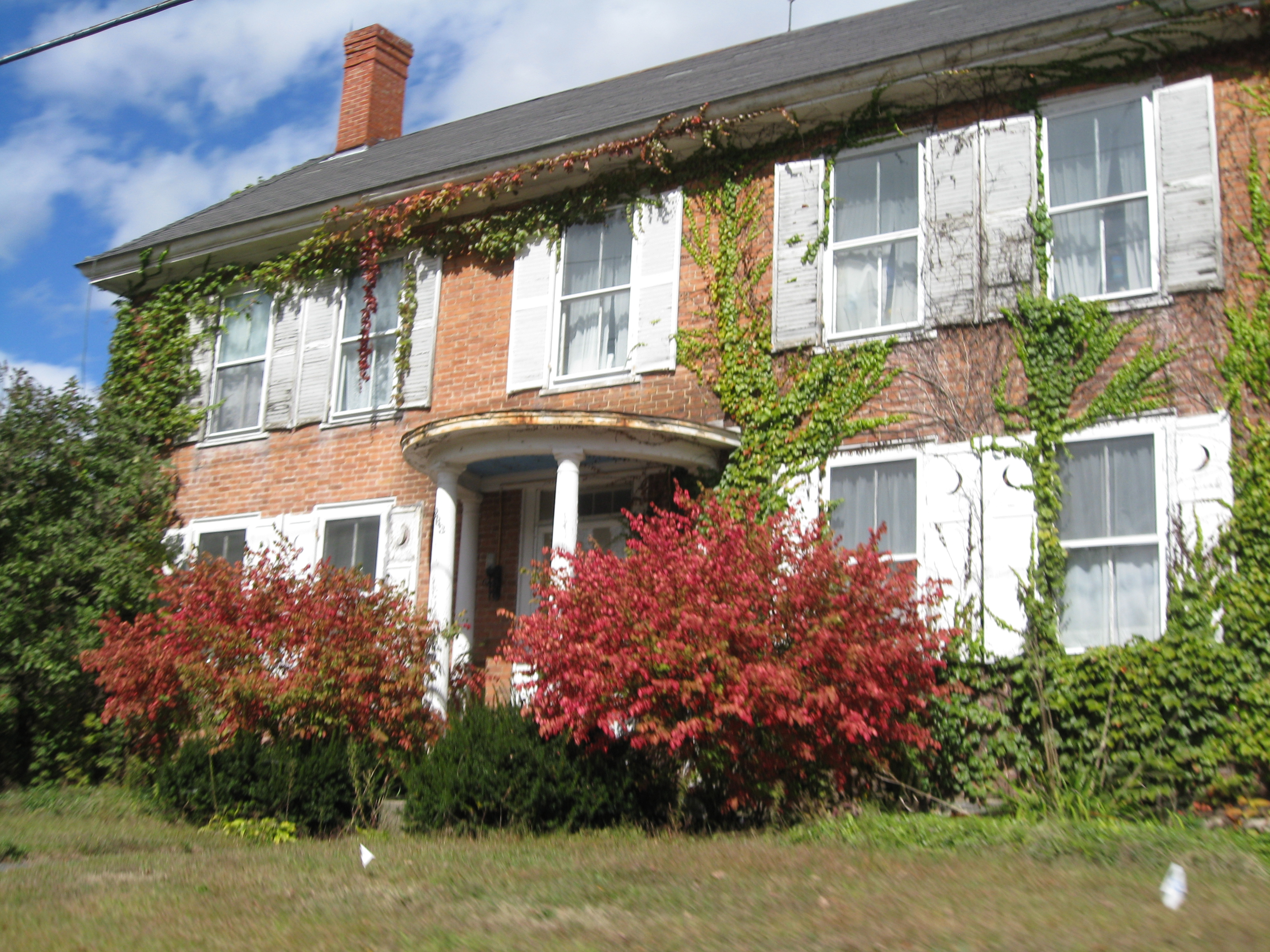

- Location within New Hampshire Location within the United States
- Location: 263 Meriden Rd., Lebanon, New Hampshire
- Coordinates: 43°37′30″N 72°13′31″W
- Area: 91.5 acres (37.0 ha)
- Built: 1799
- Built by: Maurice Downes
- Architectural style: Federal, Colonial Revival
- NRHP reference No.: 02000639
- Added to NRHP: June 13, 2002

Spring Hill Farm is a historic farm at 263 Meriden Road in Lebanon, New Hampshire. Founded in the late 18th century, the farm is noted for innovations in dairy farming practices introduced in the 1920s by Maurice Downs. It is also one of a small number of surviving farm properties in the town, and was listed on the National Register of Historic Places in 2002.

== Description and history ==
Spring Hill Farm is located in a rural setting in southeastern Lebanon, on 91.5 acres (37.0 ha) bounded at its southern and western sides by Meriden Road and Laplante Road. The farm complex is located near the road junction, containing a main house, barn, and other smaller outbuildings. The main house is a 2 1/2-story brick structure built c. 1799, and a barn constructed c. 1929 but incorporating an early 19th-century structure, as well as lumber salvaged from other period barns. Only the lands immediately north and east of the complex are open fields; the balance of the property is wooded.

When Maurice Downes, a native of Wilmot, New Hampshire, purchased this property in 1913, it included the house and three 19th-century English barns. Downes was educated in agricultural practices at the University of New Hampshire, and introduced the high-producing Holstein cow to the area for dairy production; it is now the dominant milk-producing breed in the region. In the 1920s he adapted one of the barns to house all of the dairying operations under one roof, enlarging it by using materials recycled by disassembling the other two barns. His structure included a concrete floor, and a trolley-based mechanism for removing manure to an exterior manure shed, all innovative developments in the area.

== See also ==
- National Register of Historic Places listings in Grafton County, New Hampshire
