= Felsengarten =

Historic house in New Hampshire, United States

- U.S. National Register of Historic Places
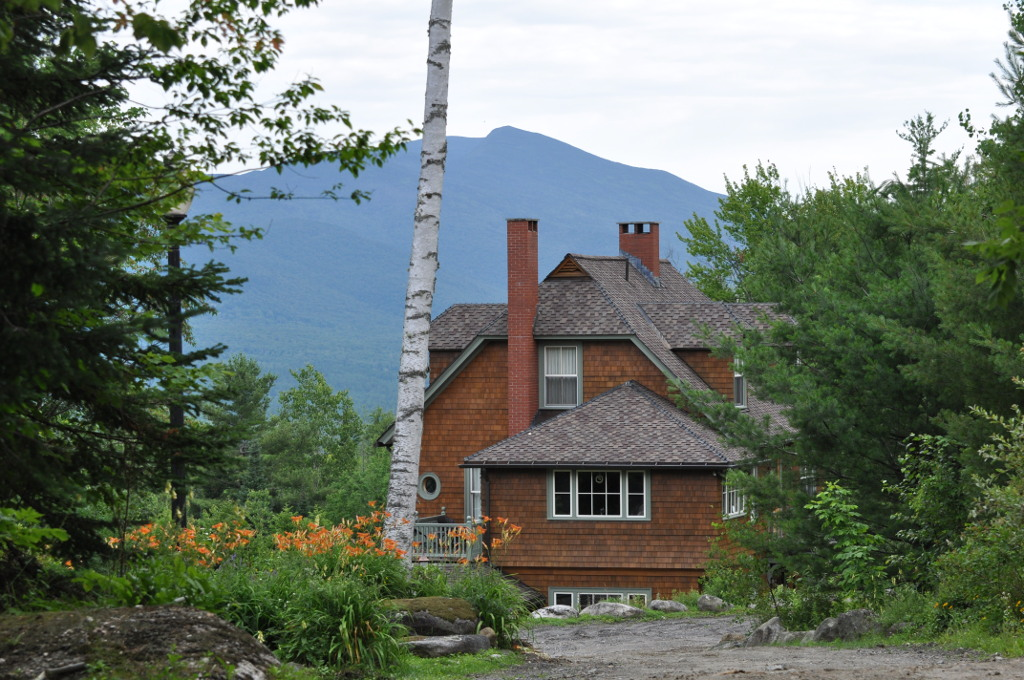

- Location within New Hampshire Location within the United States
- Location: SE of Bethlehem on Lewis Hill Rd., Bethlehem, New Hampshire
- Coordinates: 44°15′20″N 71°42′20″W
- Area: 14.8 acres (6.0 ha)
- Built: 1896
- NRHP reference No.: 73002296
- Added to NRHP: June 18, 1973

Felsengarten (German for "stone garden") is a historic summer house on Lewis Hill Road in Bethlehem, New Hampshire. The two-story house was built between 1896 and 1900 and was the summer residence of German American conductor Theodore Thomas and his wife Rose Fay. Thomas was an influential figure in popularizing classical orchestral music in the United States during the 19th century. The house and garden were listed on the National Register of Historic Places in 1973.

== Description and history ==
Felsengarten is located south of the village center of Bethlehem, at the southern end of Lewis Hill Road. It occupies a parcel about 15 acres (6.1 ha) in size on a southeast-facing hillside. The house stands on a level area carved out of the hillside with a retaining wall behind it. It is a wood-frame structure, with an exterior finished in wooden shingles and a foundation of local rubblestone. Stylistically the exterior is reminiscent of Dutch Colonial Revival architecture, with hip-roofed dormers on each roof face. The interior has only been modestly altered, mainly to add some electrical service and plumbing. It now houses an extensive collection of books and papers of Theodore Thomas, and the gardens laid out by him and his wife are still to be discerned in the landscape.

The property was developed by Theodore and Rose Thomas between 1896 and 1900 as a summer retreat. Thomas, a German immigrant, founded the Chicago Symphony Orchestra and introduced a wide swath of the classical music repertoire to the American public. His wife, well known in Chicago society before their marriage, wrote two books about the couple's time at Felsengarten.

== See also ==
- National Register of Historic Places listings in Grafton County, New Hampshire
