= Lyme Center, New Hampshire =

Unincorporated community in New Hampshire, United States

- Unincorporated community
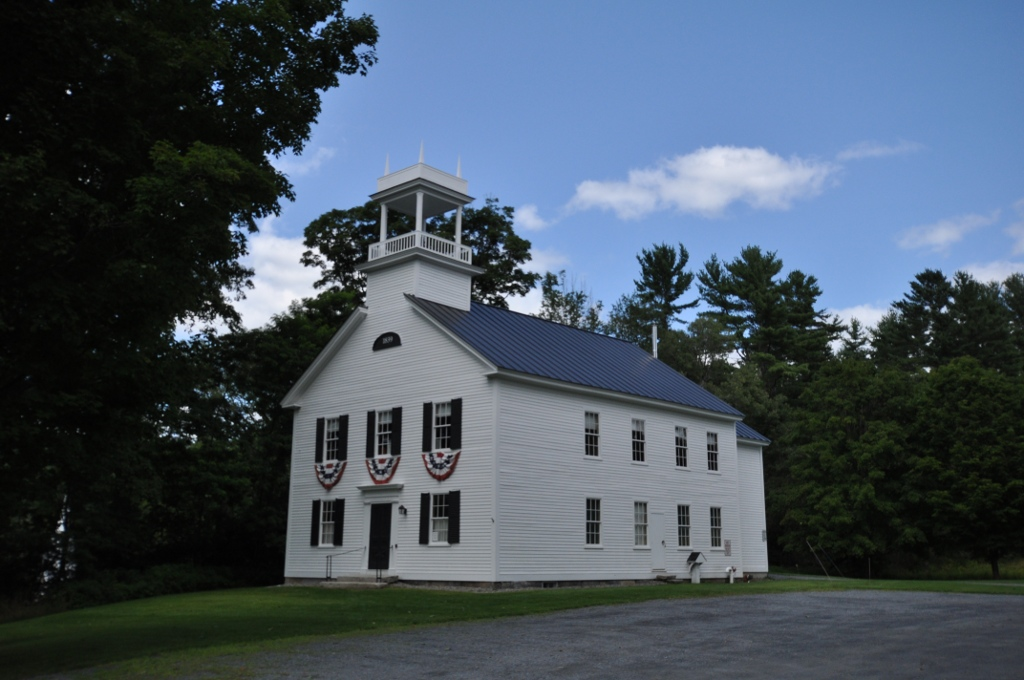
- Lyme Center Academy

- Location within New Hampshire Location within the United States
- Coordinates: 43°47′57″N 72°07′31″W
- Country: United States
- State: New Hampshire
- County: Grafton
- Town: Lyme
- Elevation: 804 ft (245 m)
- Time zone: UTC-5 (Eastern (EST))
  - Summer (DST): UTC-4 (EDT)
- ZIP code: 03769
- Area code: 603
- GNIS feature ID: 868220

Lyme Center is an unincorporated community in the town of Lyme in Grafton County, New Hampshire, United States. It is located close to the geographic center of the town of Lyme, approximately 2 miles (3 km) east of New Hampshire Route 10 where it passes through the main village of Lyme. The center of the village is listed on the National Register of Historic Places as the Lyme Center Historic District.
