= Enfield Village Historic District =

Historic district in New Hampshire, United States

- U.S. National Register of Historic Places
- U.S. Historic district
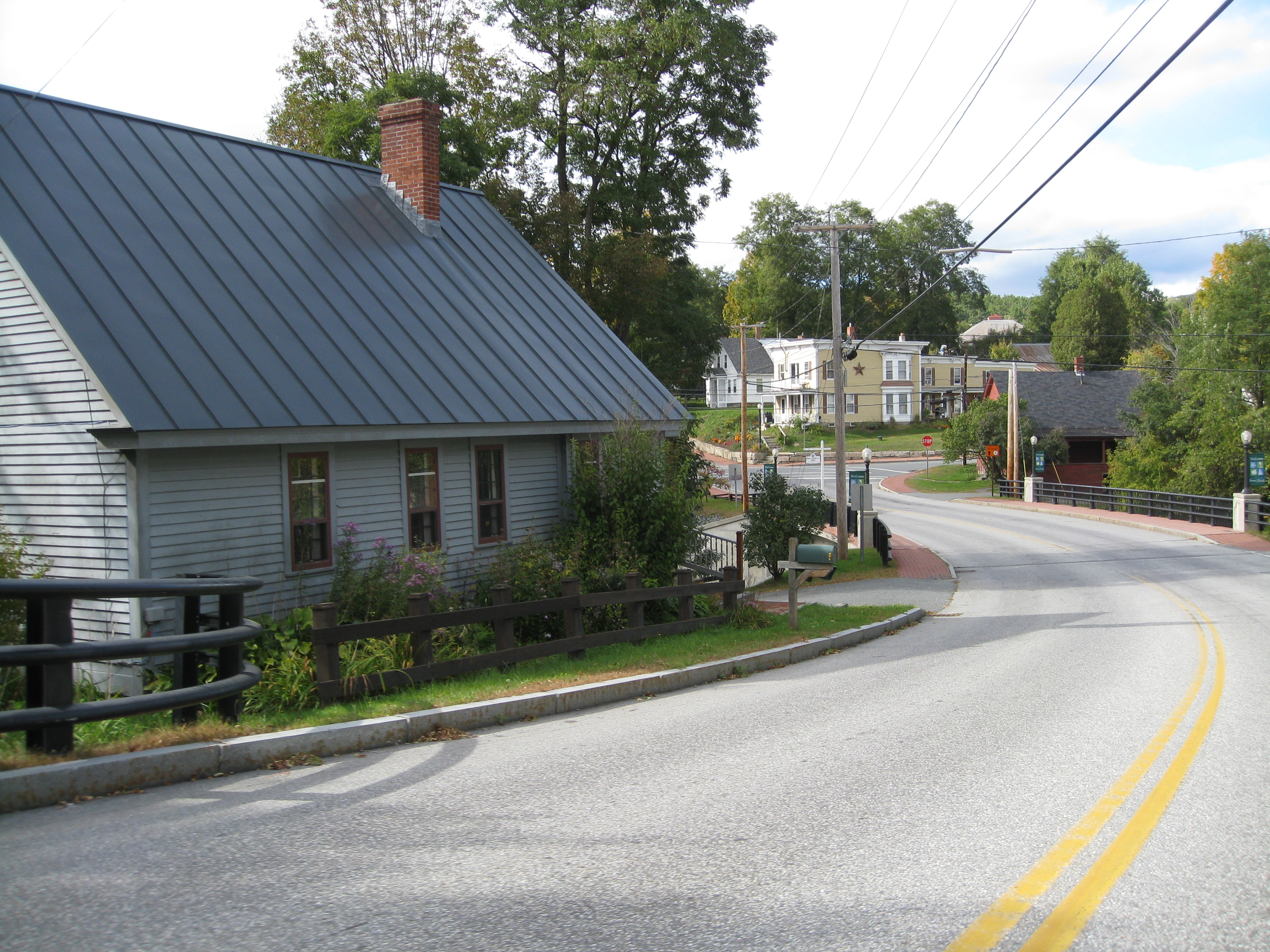

- Location within New Hampshire Location within the United States
- Location: Main St, US Route 4, High St, Baltic St, Shaker Hill Rd, Wells St, Stevens, Union, & Pillsbury St, Shedd & Mill St, Enfield, New Hampshire
- Coordinates: 43.64286°N 72.14245°W
- Area: 155 acres (63 ha)
- Built: 1840
- Architectural style: Greek Revival, Late Victorian
- NRHP reference No.: 10000186
- Added to NRHP: April 19, 2010

The Enfield Village Historic District encompasses the historic 19th century village center of Enfield, New Hampshire. The district was listed on the National Register of Historic Places in 2010. Multiple buildings of the district were added to the New Hampshire State Register of Historic Places in 2012.

== Description ==
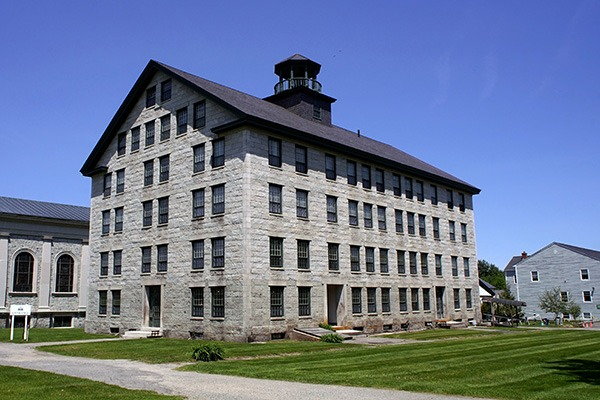
The Great Stone Dwelling; Enfield Shaker Museum, New Hampshire; Built 1837.

The district extends from Oak Grove Street in the west to the junction of Baltic Street and United States Route 4 in the east and includes properties on both sides of the Mascoma River, from Route 4 to the junction of Pillsbury Street and Shaker Hill Road. The village had modest rural beginnings but began to grow economically with the arrival of the railroad in the mid-19th century, and through the economic activity of the local Shaker community, located on the south side of Lake Mascoma. This resulted in a significant number of Greek Revival and Italianate style houses in the village. The economic power of the Shakers was significant in the village; despite its location outside the village, the Shakers owned or controlled the mills that were the early economic centerpiece of the village. Although a number of mills were built, the major economic activity was eventually consolidated in the Baltic Mills complex, the only major mill complexes to survive. These privately owned enterprises resulted in the town's largest period of economic growth, around the turn of the 20th century, when much of the town's commercial center was developed. The village is also home to the town's major civic structures, including c. 1901 Whitney Hall, which houses the town offices and library, the 1852 Unitarian church, and a c. 1907 school, now Enfield Village School.

Six district buildings were added to the New Hampshire State Register of Historic Places in 2012: the Stickney House (10 Wells Street), J.P. Washburn House (102 Main Street), Francis H. Wells House (16 Wells Street), Woodbury House (130 Main Street), North Enfield Universalist Meeting House (96 Main Street), and a duplex (264 Route 4).

== See also ==
- Enfield Shaker Museum
- National Register of Historic Places listings in Grafton County, New Hampshire
- New Hampshire Historical Marker No. 241: Downtown Enfield Village
