= Piermont Bridge =

- U.S. National Register of Historic Places
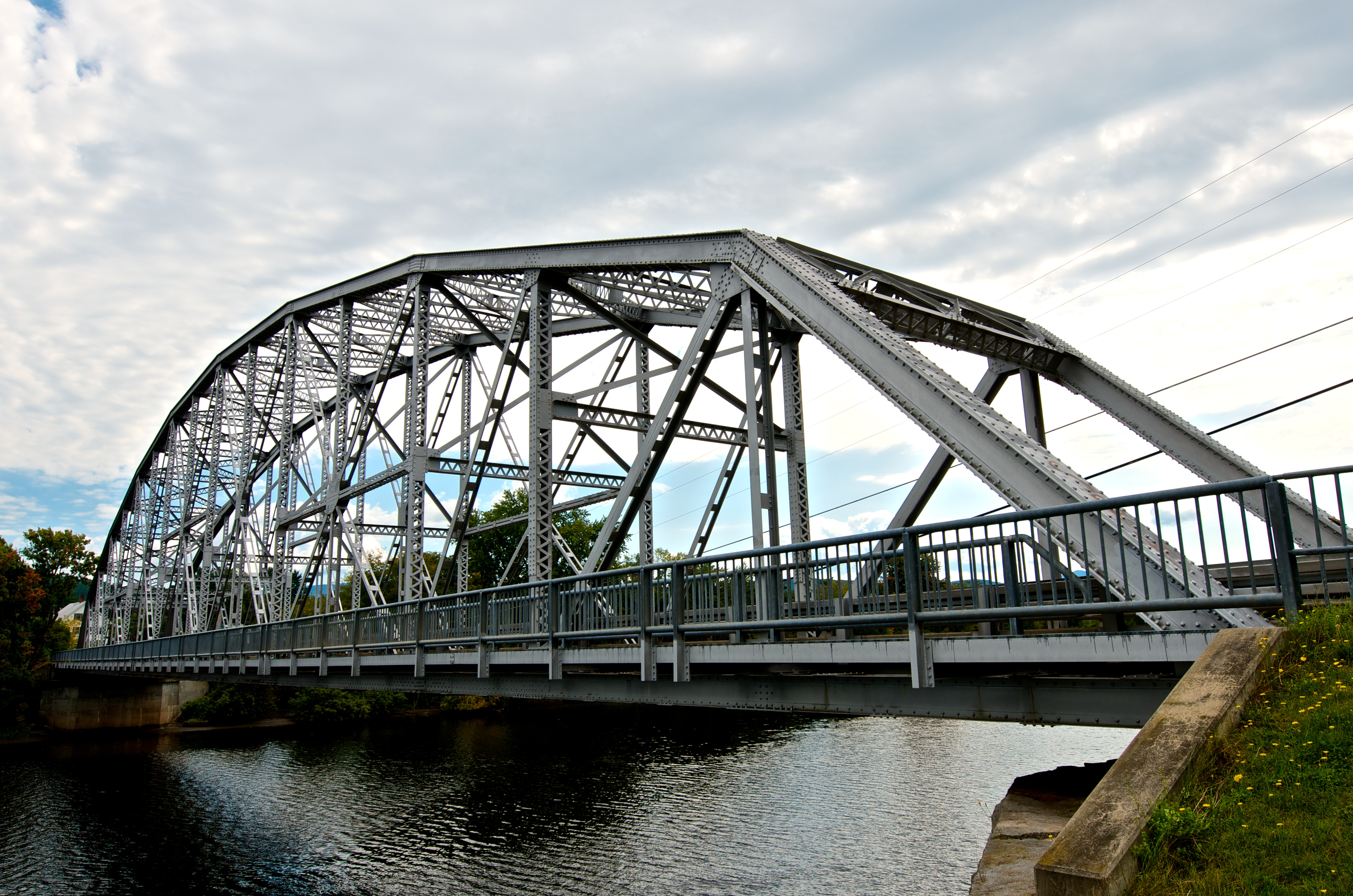

- Location within New Hampshire Location within Vermont Location within the United States
- Location: NH 25 over Connecticut R.at Vermont State line, Piermont, New Hampshire
- Coordinates: 43°58′40″N 72°6′45″W
- Area: less than one acre
- Built: 1928
- Built by: New Hampshire Highway Dept.; Boston Bridge Works
- Architectural style: Pennsylvania through truss
- NRHP reference No.: 01000630
- Added to NRHP: June 6, 2001

The Piermont Bridge carries New Hampshire Route 25 over the Connecticut River to the contiguous Vermont Route 25 between Piermont, New Hampshire and Bradford, Vermont. It is a Pennsylvania steel through truss bridge, built by the Boston Bridge Works in 1928. The bridge consists of a single span with a clear span of 352' and an overall length of 354'10". The roadbed is 20'7" wide, with a vertical clearance of 14'7". The bridge is approximately 25' above the river. The western (Vermont) abutment is made of split granite quarried from nearby Fairlee Mountain, while the eastern abutment is an early concrete construction built in 1908 by John Storrs for an earlier bridge. The bridge underwent a major renovation in 1993 which included the addition of a sidewalk (under which utilities were laid) and replacement of much of the bridge decking.

The bridge was built in the aftermath of major rain and flooding in 1927 along the Connecticut River, which washed away several bridges and caused significant damage in Vermont. The Piermont Bridge was the longest bridge built after this flooding, replacing a two-span Town lattice truss bridge dating back to 1875. The center pier of the older bridge was knocked down to the waterline and is still visible. The eastern abutment, built in 1908 in a relatively early use of structural concrete, needed to be strengthened to accommodate the increased weight of the new steel bridge. This was accomplished by adding new concrete to the land side of the abutment, preserving the earlier work.

The bridge was listed on the National Register of Historic Places in 2001. It is owned by the states of New Hampshire (90%) and Vermont (10%).

== See also ==
- List of crossings of the Connecticut River
- National Register of Historic Places listings in Grafton County, New Hampshire
- National Register of Historic Places listings in Orange County, Vermont
- List of bridges on the National Register of Historic Places in New Hampshire
- List of bridges on the National Register of Historic Places in Vermont
