= Donat R. Baribault =

American architect (1885–1970)

Donat Rodolphe Baribault
- Born: February 3, 1885; New Haven, Connecticut
- Died: March 19, 1970 (aged 85); Springfield, Massachusetts
- Occupation: Architect

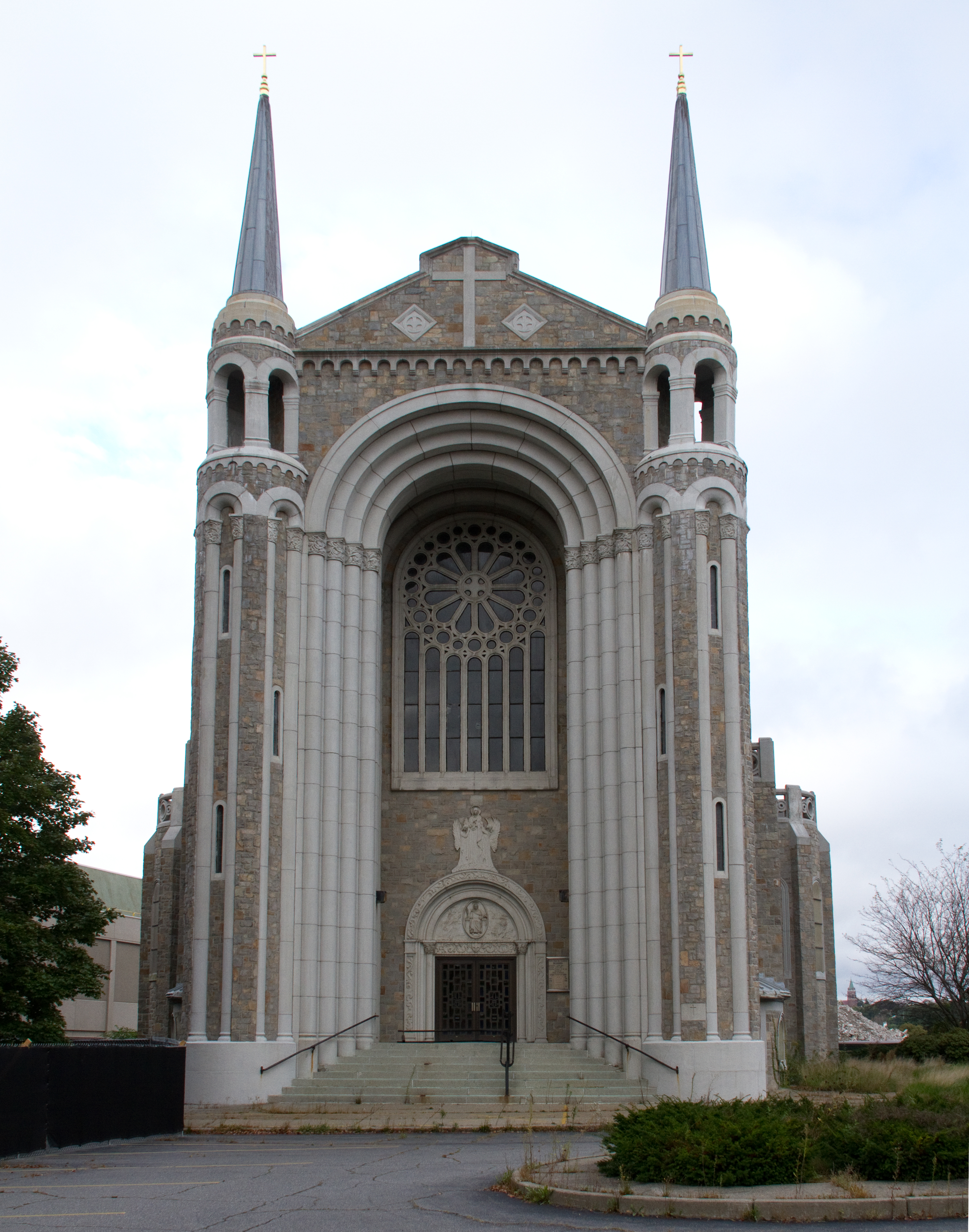
The former Church of Notre Dame des Canadiens in Worcester, Massachusetts, designed by Baribault and completed in 1929. The church was demolished in 2018.

Donat R. Baribault (1885–1970) was an American architect who designed a number of Catholic churches, schools, convents and rectories in Western Massachusetts and New Hampshire.

== Early life and career ==
Donat Rodolphe Baribault was born February 3, 1885, in New Haven, Connecticut, to Jules Baribault and Marie (Lanouette) Baribault. Both of his parents were natives of Sainte-Anne-de-la-Pérade in Mauricie, Quebec. He attended the New Haven public schools and the Séminaire Saint-Joseph de Trois-Rivières in Quebec. He graduated from the École Polytechnique de Montréal in 1909 with a BS, with additional postgraduate study in architecture with Joseph Haynes, a professor at the same school. In 1912 he began practice as an architect and engineer in Winnipeg, Manitoba, staying until 1917. He then moved to Springfield, Massachusetts, where he worked for the Samuel M. Green Company, architects and engineers. In 1920 he opened his own office as an architect in Springfield. As an architect Baribault specialized in the design of churches and institutional buildings for the Catholic church. He practiced architecture into the 1960s.

Baribault was a member of the Architectural Society of Western Massachusetts for whom he served as Secretary (1942–43) and President (1944–45). In 1955 he joined the American Institute of Architects.

== Personal life ==
In Springfield, Baribault was a parishioner of St. Joseph R. C. Church. He was married in 1918 to Rosalie M. Remillard of Lorette, Manitoba. They had seven children. Baribault died March 19, 1970, in Springfield at the age of 85.

== Legacy ==
Baribault's churches were designed in the Byzantine Revival, Gothic Revival and Renaissance Revival styles, all popular for churches. Baribault's two largest works, the churches of the Immaculate Conception in Holyoke and Notre Dame in Worcester, have both been demolished. One of his works has been listed on the United States National Register of Historic Places, and another contributes to a listed historic district.

== Architectural works ==
=== Massachusetts ===
- Immaculate Conception R. C. Church, 54 N Summer St, Holyoke, Massachusetts (1925–27, demolished 2006)
- Our Lady of Perpetual Help R. C. Church school, 261 Chestnut St, Holyoke, Massachusetts (1926, burned 1999)
- Notre Dame R. C. Church rectory, 446 Main St, Southbridge, Massachusetts (1927, NRHP 1989)
- R. C. Church of Notre Dame des Canadiens, Church and Franklin Sts, Worcester, Massachusetts (1927–29, demolished 2018)
- Our Lady of Czestochowa R. C. Church, 84 K St, Turners Falls, Massachusetts (1929)
- St. Joseph R. C. Church rectory, 82 Howard St, Springfield, Massachusetts (1930, demolished)
- St. Cecelia R. C. Church, (Note: With supervising architect Albert J. Roy of Worcester.) 180 Mechanic St, Leominster, Massachusetts (1931–33)

=== New Hampshire ===
- Mary Keane Chapel, Shrine of Our Lady of La Salette (former), (Note: Now part of the Enfield Shaker Museum and listed on the National Register of Historic Places as part of the Enfield Shaker Historic District.) Enfield, New Hampshire (1930)
- Sacred Heart R. C. Church (former), 54 Pleasant St, Concord, New Hampshire (1933–34)
- St. Charles Borromeo R. C. Church, 577 Central Ave, Dover, New Hampshire (1933, demolished 2017)
- Oblate Fathers Retreat House (former), (Note: Now the main building of Mission Pointe, a housing development.) 9 Reflection Dr, Hudson, New Hampshire (no date)

== Gallery of architectural works ==
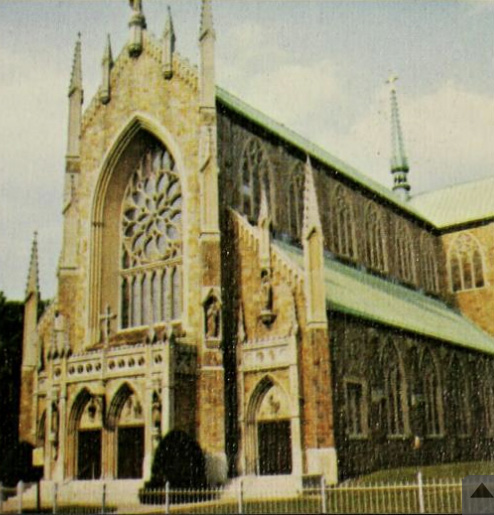
Immaculate Conception R. C. Church, Holyoke, Massachusetts, 1925–27.

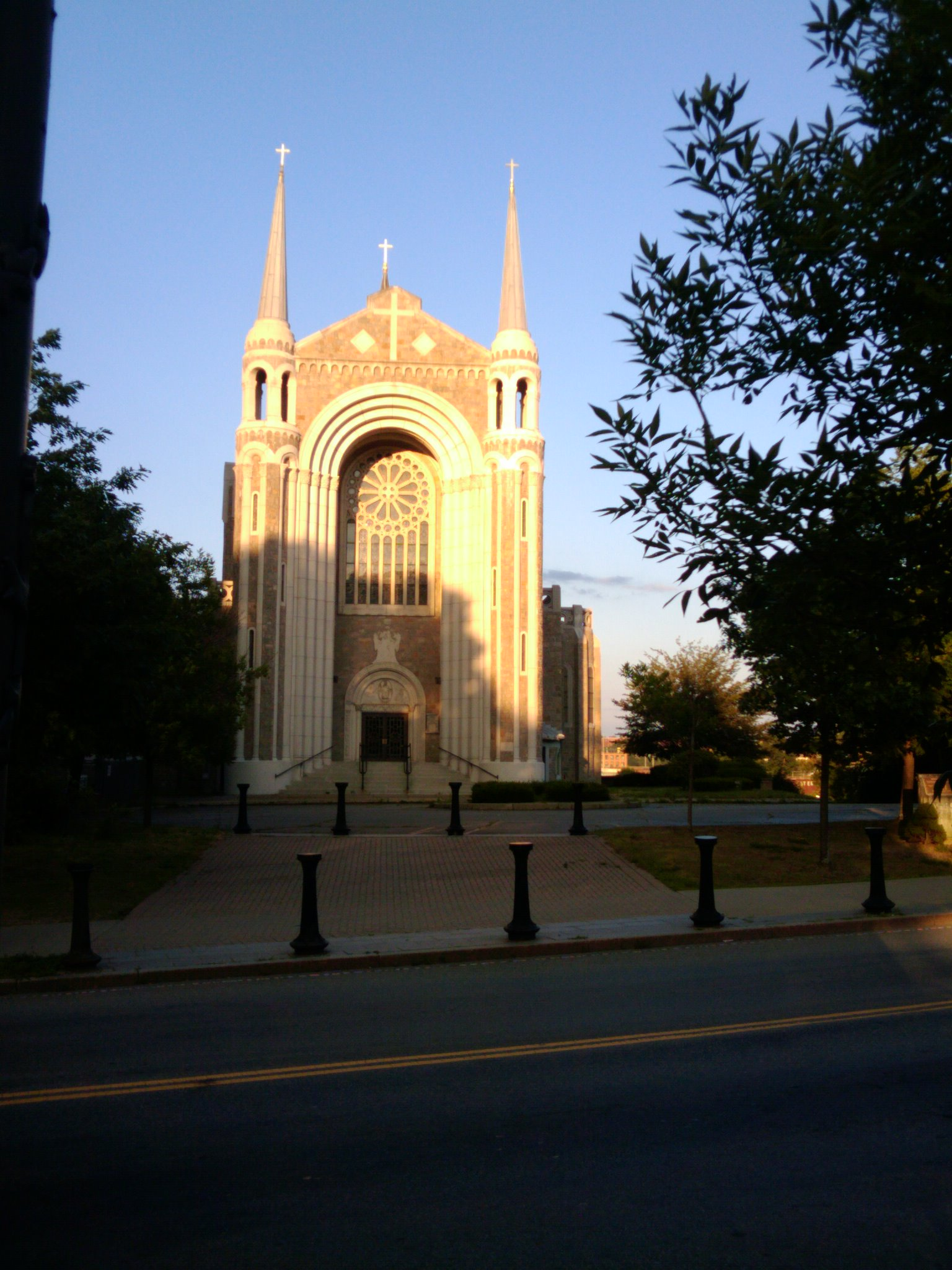
R. C. Church of Notre Dame des Canadiens, Worcester, Massachusetts, 1927–29.

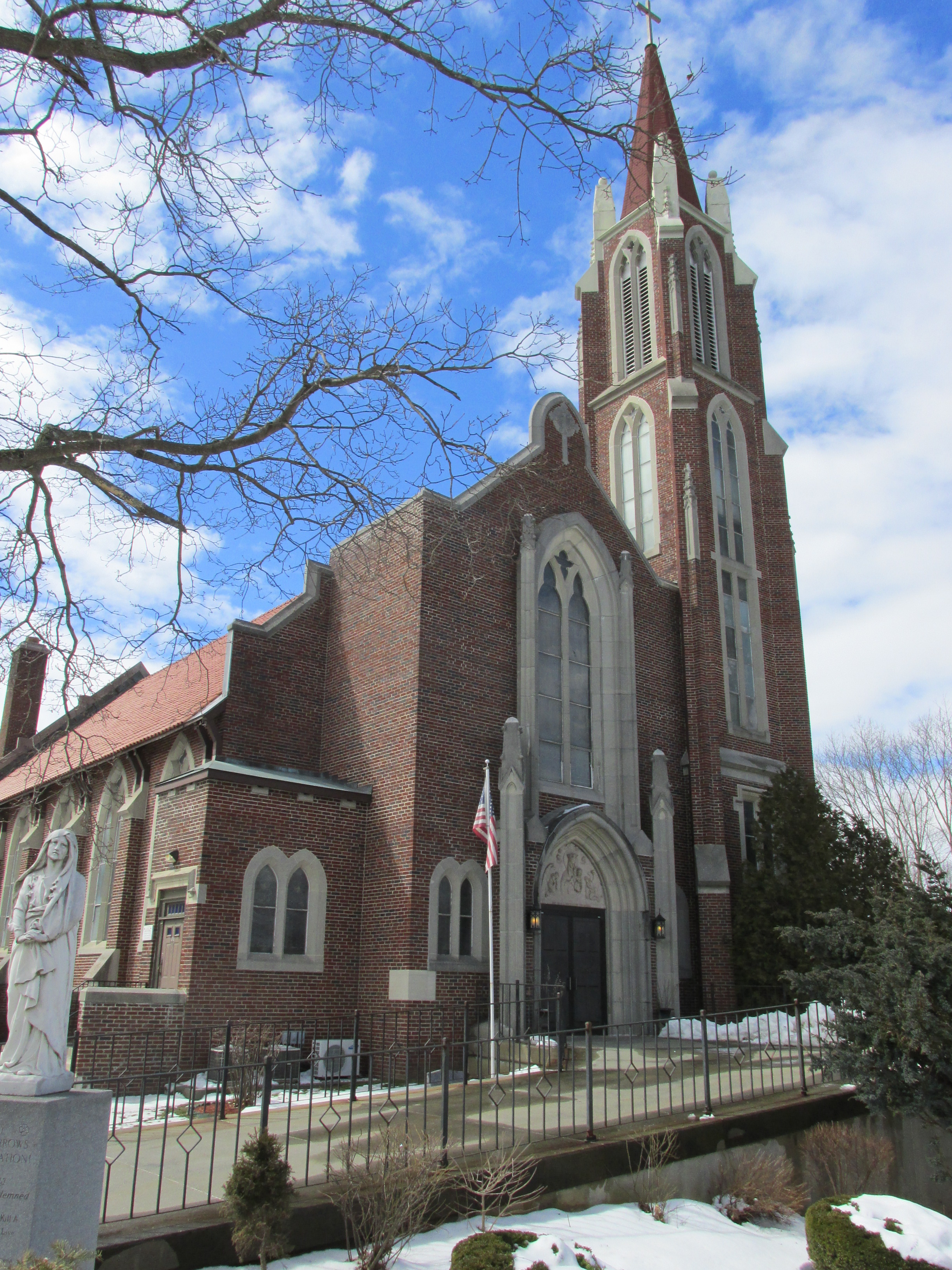
Our Lady of Czestochowa R. C. Church, Turners Falls, Massachusetts, 1929.

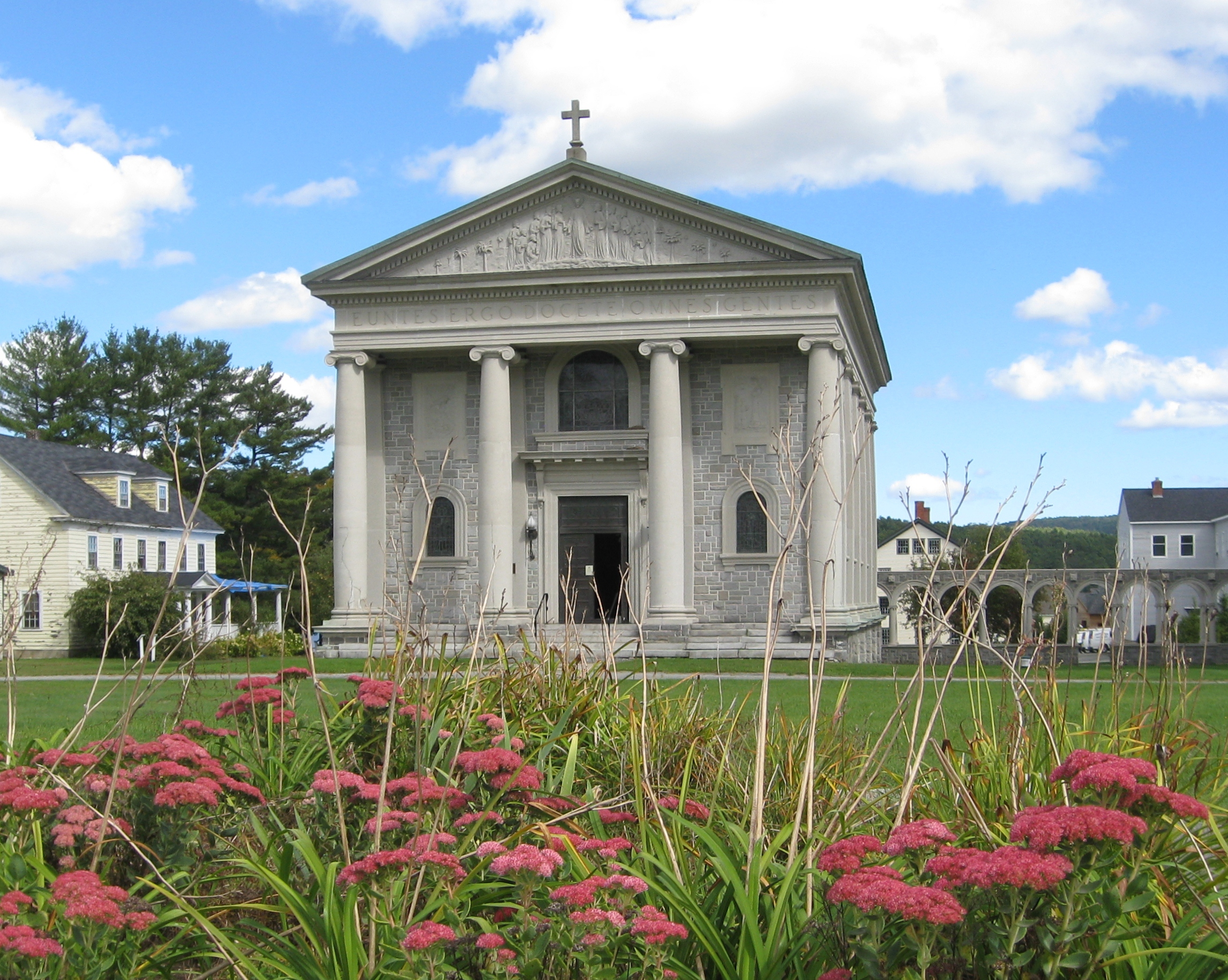
Mary Keane Chapel, Shrine of Our Lady of La Salette, Enfield, New Hampshire, 1930.

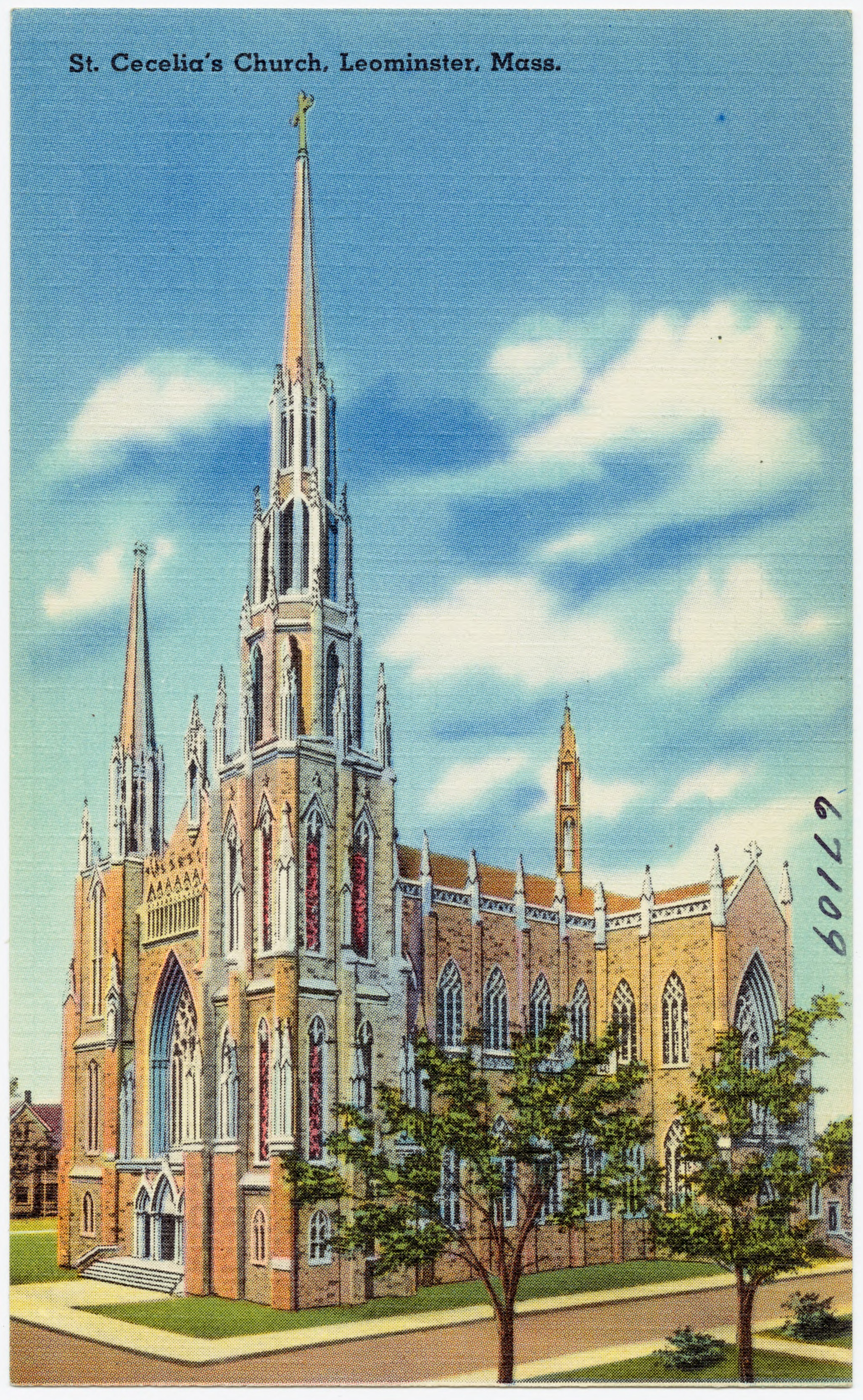
St. Cecelia R. C. Church, Leominster, Massachusetts, 1931–33.
