= Enfield Center, New Hampshire =

Unincorporated community in New Hampshire, United States

- Unincorporated community
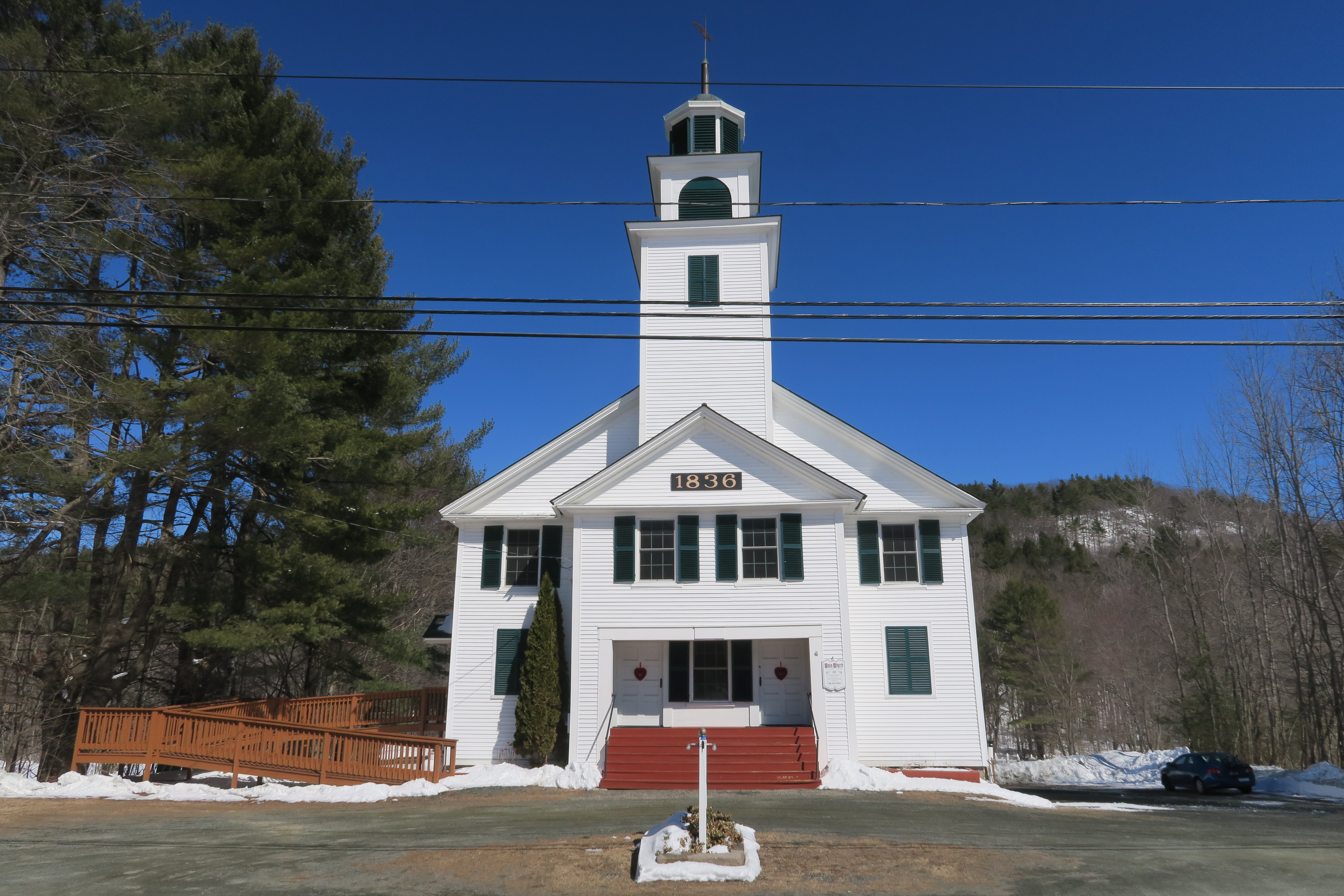
- Union Church

- Location within New Hampshire Location within the United States
- Coordinates: 43°35′24″N 72°06′39″W
- Country: United States
- State: New Hampshire
- County: Grafton
- Town: Enfield
- Elevation: 873 ft (266 m)
- Time zone: UTC-5 (Eastern (EST))
  - Summer (DST): UTC-4 (EDT)
- ZIP code: 03749
- Area code: 603
- GNIS feature ID: 866803

Enfield Center is an unincorporated community in the town of Enfield in Grafton County, New Hampshire, United States. It is a separate community from the much larger village of Enfield, which is located in the northern corner of the town.

Enfield Center is located, as the name suggests, near the geographic center of the town of Enfield. It lies along New Hampshire Route 4A, approximately 1 mile (1.6 km) south of the southern end of Mascoma Lake and about 3 miles (5 km) south of Enfield village. The Knox River flows northward through the village on its way from George Pond to Mascoma Lake.

Enfield Center has a separate ZIP code (03749) from the rest of the town of Enfield. Two of its buildings are listed on the National Register of Historic Places; the Centre Village Meeting House (also known as the Union Church) and the Enfield Center Town House.
