= Knox River =

River in New Hampshire, United States

- Location within New Hampshire Location within the United States

Location
- Country: United States
- State: New Hampshire
- County: Grafton
- Towns: Enfield

Physical characteristics
- Source: George Pond
  - location: Fish Market (Enfield)
  - coordinates: 43°34′51″N 72°6′5″W
  - elevation: 974 ft (297 m)
- Mouth: Mascoma Lake
  - location: Enfield
  - coordinates: 43°36′23″N 72°7′30″W
  - elevation: 748 ft (228 m)
- Length: 2.5 mi (4.0 km)

The Knox River is a 2.5-mile-long (4.0 km) river in western New Hampshire in the United States. The river is an inlet of Mascoma Lake, which drains by the Mascoma River to the Connecticut River and ultimately Long Island Sound.

The Knox River lies entirely in the town of Enfield. It begins at the village of Fish Market as the outlet of George Pond and flows northwest through Enfield Center to the southeastern end of Mascoma Lake. The river is paralleled for its entire length by New Hampshire Route 4A.

== See also ==
- List of rivers of New Hampshire
