= Mary Marshall Dyer =

American anti-Shakerist

Mary Dyer
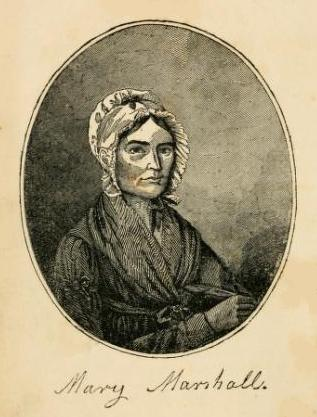
- Portrait engraved c. 1820
- Born: Mary Marshall; 1780
- Died: 1867 (aged 86–87)
- Years active: 1815–1867
- Known for: Anti-Shaker activism
- Notable work: A brief statement of the sufferings of Mary Dyer occasioned by the society called Shakers (1818); A portraiture of Shakerism (1822)

Mary Marshall Dyer (1780–1867) was a voice for the largely forgotten anti-Shakerism sentiment in rural New Hampshire, United States. In 1813 she joined the Shakers of Enfield, New Hampshire. Disappointed in her lack of a leadership role and frustrated by the constraints of Shaker life, Dyer left the community in 1815. Her husband, Joseph, remained, as did all five of the Dyer children. Mary Dyer accused the Shakers of alienating her from her children. Fearing for her children's safety and left without any means of financial support, she gave public talks and wrote tracts against the Shakers in an attempt to gain public, and legislative, support for her cause.

Her principal writings included A Brief Statement of the Sufferings of Mary Dyer and A Portraiture of Shakerism in 1822. In 1819, she attempted to raise a mob to storm the Enfield Shaker Community to take her children back, but this effort failed. Joseph Dyer remained devoted to the community and criticized her in strong terms, responding in print to his wife's published accusations. Four of her five children remained Shakers for life. Her son, Jerrub, left the Shakers late in life, but did not appear to have a close relationship to his mother. By the 1850s Dyer's anti-Shakerism seemed extreme, in New England at least where the Shakers were now considered "quaint" rather than dangerous. Mary Dyer died a largely forgotten figure in 1867.

In the early nineteenth century, a married mother with a living husband had few legal rights over her children; the husband was their legal guardian, and when he indentured their children to the Shakers, Shakers became the Dyer children's legal guardians. Thus the Shakers' holding of the children was legal under the law of that time and place. Given those laws, Mary Dyer was the parent who attempted kidnapping.

Unlike others who also published books on Shaker-related parental kidnappings and lobbied for laws against such practices involving Shaker parents (Capt. Joseph Smith, 1810; Eunice Chapman, 1819), Dyer took an active part in assisting others involved in such cases and in educating the public about what she saw as the anti-family ideology and activities of the Shakers. Her activism reached from 1815 until her death in 1867.

== The Dyer family ==
- Mary Marshall Dyer (1780–1867)
- Joseph Dyer (Jun. 19, 1772–1858)
- Caleb Marshall Dyer (Aug. 25, 1800 – Jul. 18, 1863)
- Betsey Dyer (Jan. 6, 1802 –1824)
- Orville Dyer (Jun. 15, 1804 – 1882)
- Jerrub Dyer (Mar. 27, 1806 – 1886)
- Joseph Dyer Jr. (Feb. 9, 1809 – 1840)

== Publications ==
- Dyer, Mary M., A brief statement of the sufferings of Mary Dyer occasioned by the society called Shakers, 1818, William S. Spear, Boston, 35 pp.
- Dyer, Mary M., A portraiture of Shakerism, exhibiting a general view of their character and conduct, from the first appearance of Ann Lee in New-England, down to the present time, Printed for the Author [Concord, N.H.], Jun. 1823 (“1822”), 446 pp
- Dyer, Mary M., Reply to the Shakers' statements called a "Review of the Portraiture of Shakerism," with an account of sickness and death of Betsy Dyer; a sketch of the journey of the author and testimonies from several persons, 1824, Marshall (Concord, N.H.), 112 pp.
- Marshall, Mary M. [Mary. M. Dyer], The Rise And Progress Of The Serpent From The Garden Of Eden, To The Present Day: With A Disclosure Of Shakerism, Exhibiting A General View Of Their Real Character And Conduct—From The First Appearance Of Ann Lee. Also, The Life And Sufferings Of The Author, Who Was Mary M. Dyer, But Now Is Mary Marshall, Concord, N.H., 1847, 269 pp.
- Dyer, Joseph, A compendious narrative, elucidating the character, disposition and conduct of Mary Dyer from the time of her marriage, in 1799, till she left the society called Shakers, in 1815, with a few remarks upon certain charges which she has since published against that society. Together with sundry depositions, [Feb.] 1819 (“1818”), Concord [N.H.], Printed by Isaac Hill for the author, Concord, N.H., 88 pp. (Early American Imprints: 43899; 47864); 2nd edition, 1826, Pittsfield
- Dyer, Mary M., Shakerism Exposed, 1852, Dartmouth Press (Hanover, N.H.), 32 pp.
