= Mount Assurance =

Mountain in New Hampshire, United States

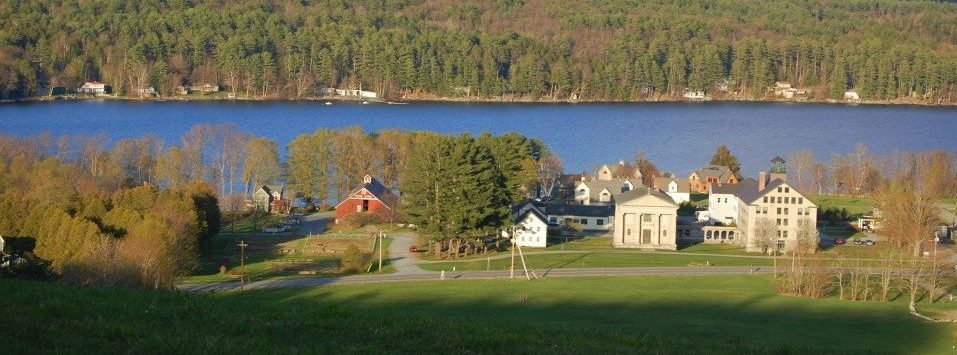
- View from Mount Assurance, Enfield, New Hampshire

Highest point
- Coordinates: 43.6270°N 72.1776°W

Geography
- Location: Enfield, New Hampshire, United States

Mount Assurance is a mountain in New Hampshire, United States. It is close to Enfield and Mascoma Lake. It is possible to hike up the mountain.

The Shaker community in Enfield treated the peak as being sacred.

== See also ==
- Enfield Shaker Museum
