= Enfield Center Town House =

- U.S. National Register of Historic Places
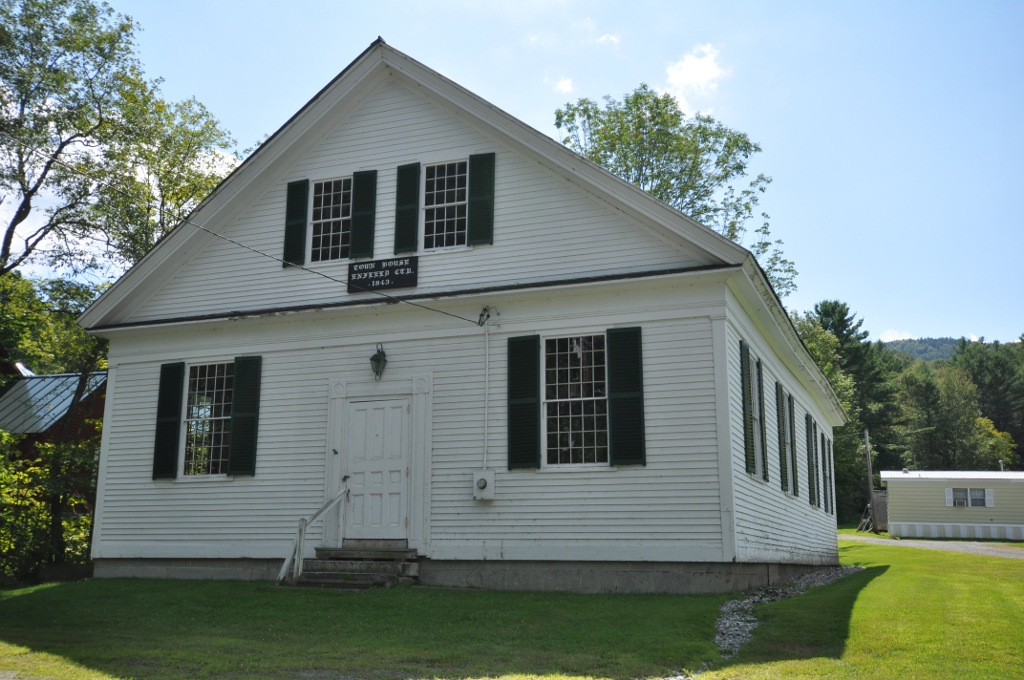

- Location within New Hampshire Location within the United States
- Location: 1044 NH 4A, Enfield Center, New Hampshire
- Coordinates: 43.591053°N 72.110371°W
- Built: 1845
- Architectural style: Greek Revival
- NRHP reference No.: 100001318
- Added to NRHP: July 17, 2017

The Enfield Center Town House is an historic former town hall on New Hampshire Route 4A in Enfield Center, New Hampshire. Constructed in 1845–46, it was added to the National Register of Historic Places (NRHP) in 2017.

The building was moved and expanded in 1859, and was renovated in 1909; it was last used as a town hall in 1913. It is diagonally across the street from the Centre Village Meeting House, which is also NRHP-listed.

== See also ==
- National Register of Historic Places listings in Grafton County, New Hampshire
