= Notre Dame Catholic Church (Southbridge, Massachusetts) =

Historic church in Massachusetts, United States

- U.S. National Register of Historic Places
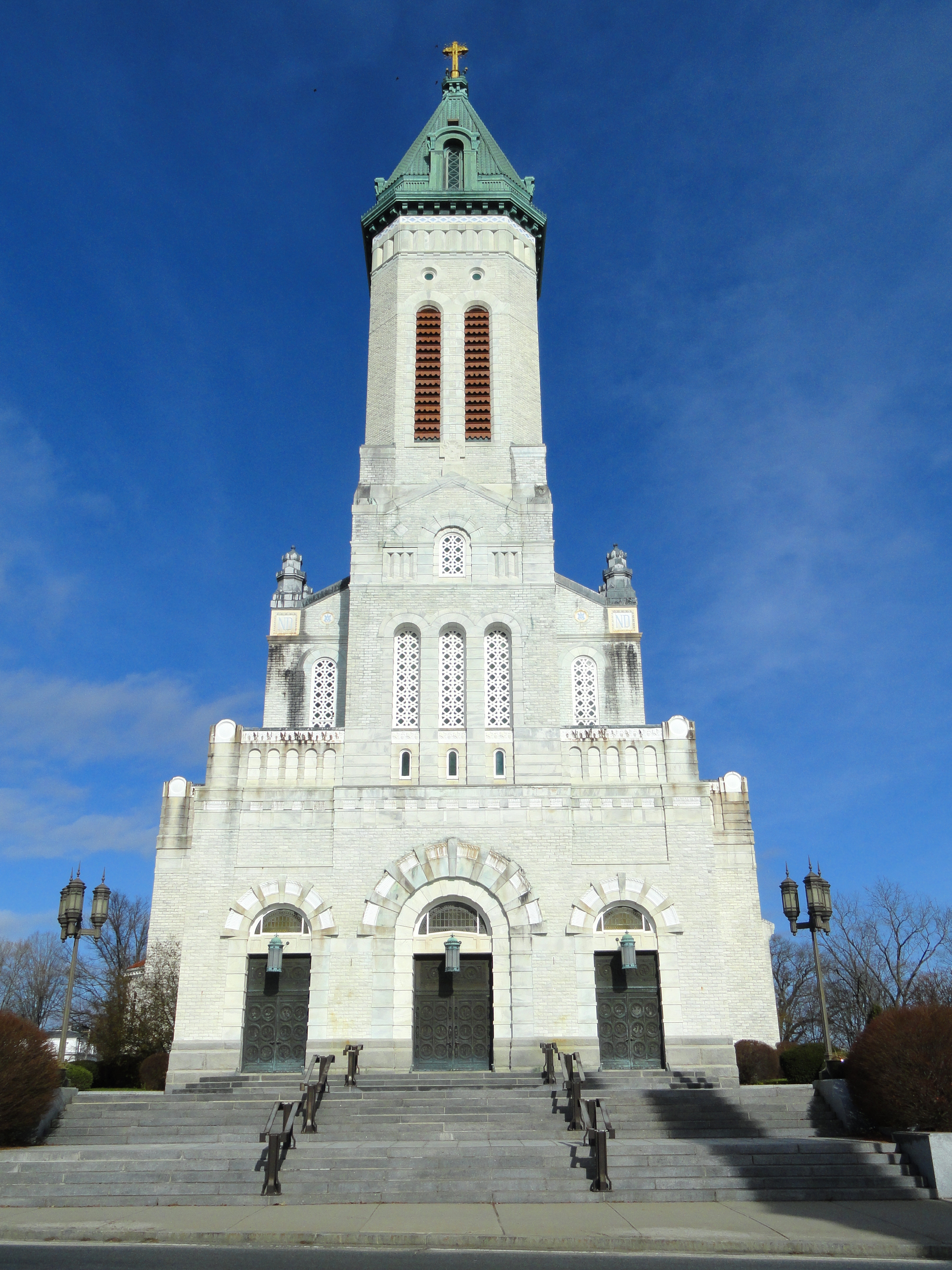

- Location within Massachusetts Location within the United States
- Location: 446 Main St., Southbridge, Massachusetts
- Coordinates: 42°4′40″N 72°2′13″W
- Built: 1912
- Architect: Joseph Venne, architect Gonippo Raggi interior Donat R. Baribault, rectory (attached to back of church)
- Architectural style: Late 19th And 20th Century Revivals
- MPS: Southbridge MRA
- NRHP reference No.: 89000563
- Added to NRHP: June 22, 1989

Notre Dame Catholic Church is a historic church in Southbridge, Massachusetts. It is one of two churches serving the Parish of Saint John Paul II; Saint Mary Church, located at the corner of Marcy and Hamilton Street, also serves as the location of the Parish Center and Rectory.

Notre Dame was built from 1912 to 1916 and added to the National Register of Historic Places in 1989.

== History ==
Notre Dame Parish was founded in 1869 to serve the needs of the French Canadian community of Southbridge who migrated here beginning in the 1830s. A frame wood church was built shortly thereafter. The second Pastor Msgr Georges Elzar Brochu began to raise funds for a much larger church in the 1880s.

In 1895 Msgr Brochu purchased land at the corner of Main and Marcy for the new church. Part of the purchase agreement stipulated that the church could not actually be built until after the death of Mr. Marcy, the prior owner. As a result, Msgr Brochu, who died in 1904 was unable to begin construction which was eventually undertaken by his successor, Msgr Louis O. Trigonne after Mr. Marcy died in 1908.

Notre Dame Church was the last of three churches built in Massachusetts for French congregations by Canadian architect Joseph Venne. The others were St. Anthony Church in New Bedford, Massachusetts (Venne's earliest church in the US, begun 1902) and Notre Dame Church in Adams, Massachusetts.

The building is 190 feet in length and the nave is 75 feet wide. The transept is 123 feet across and the ceiling is 55 feet high. The tower is 210 feet high and has extensive views of the Southbridge area.

== Music ==
The organ at Notre Dame Church was built in 1916 by the Casavant Frères Pipe Organ Company of Saint-Hyacinthe, Quebec, Opus 649. The large French Romantic instrument of 4 manuals and 42 ranks is capable of performing the full spectrum of organ literature. It is one of the largest and most complete instruments of any Catholic church in the State of Massachusetts.

== See also ==
- National Register of Historic Places listings in Southbridge, Massachusetts
- National Register of Historic Places listings in Worcester County, Massachusetts
