= Joseph Venne =

Canadian architect

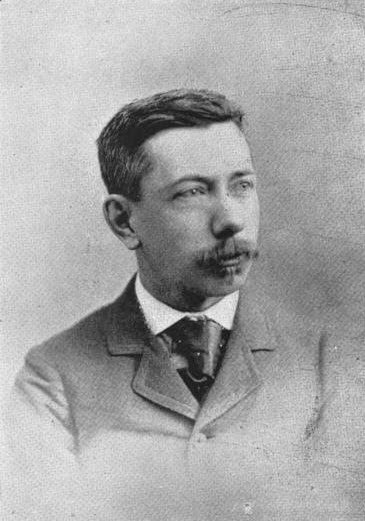
- Born: 1858; Montreal
- Died: 1925 (aged 66–67); Montreal
- Known for: distinguished architect and founder of Ordre des architectes du Québec

Joseph Venne (1858–1925) was a prominent Canadian architect whose practice was located in Montreal, Quebec. During a long and distinguished career he designed more than sixty buildings in the Montreal area and three large Catholic churches in Massachusetts.

== Early life and architectural training ==
Born in Montreal in 1858, he quickly established himself into the network of prominent architects who erected buildings for most French-speaking Montrealers.

== Architectural practice ==
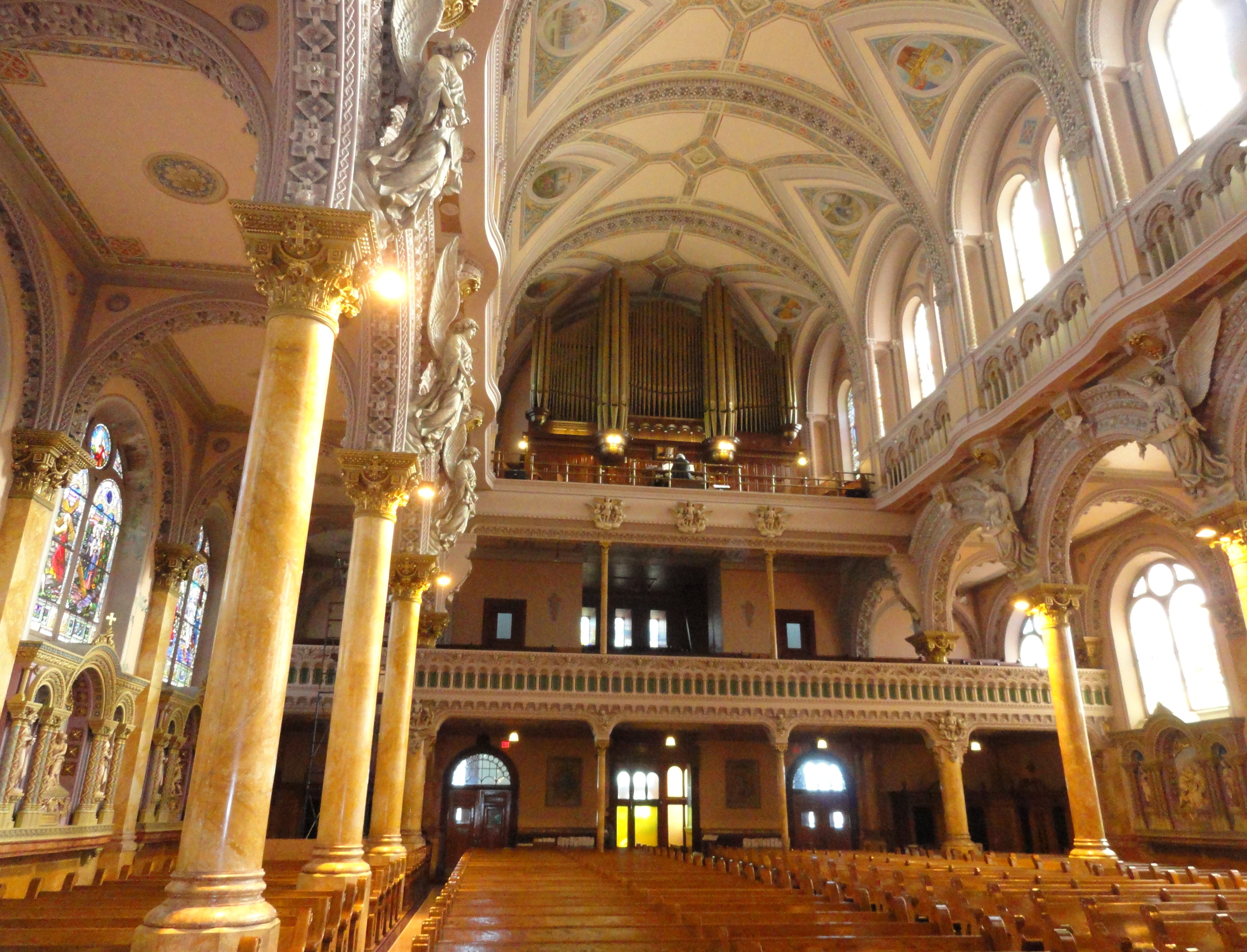
Interior of St. Anthony Church, New Bedford (1902)

Mr. Venne was architect for over a hundred buildings, including several churches, schools and the famous National Monument. His buildings incorporated innovative use of materials such as steel, concrete and glass. He helped found what would become of the Ordre des architectes du Québec, as well as developing a building code of the City of Montreal to establish standards of quality and safety.

== Works include ==
- Church of the Sacred Heart of Jesus, 1887
- College of Philosophy, Côte-des-Neiges, 1890
- La Banque du Peuple, 1893
- Monument-National, 1891
- Laval University of Montreal, 1893
- Church of St. Clement Viauville, 1899
- Église Sainte-Anne-des-Plaines, 1901
- Facade for the church of Saint-Enfant-Jésus du Mile-End, 1902
- St. Anthony Church, New Bedford, Massachusetts USA, 1902
- Church of Saint-Michel, Percé Canada, 1903
- Church of Verdun, 1905
- Presbytery of Hochelaga, 1906
- Orphanage Saint-Arsène, 1906
- Grey Nuns Motherhouse, Saint-Matthieu wing
- School Salaberry, 1907
- Church of Our Lady of Sorrows, Verdun, 1911
- Church of St. Catherine, 1912
- Church of Saint-Denis, Plateau Mont-Royal, 1913
- Church of St. Anselm, 1913
- Notre Dame Church, Southbridge, Massachusetts USA, 1916
- Church Saint-Pierre-Claver, 1917

== External ==
- Historic Places of Canada
