= Monument-National =

Historic Canadian theatre

Coordinates: 45.5091°N 73.5625°W

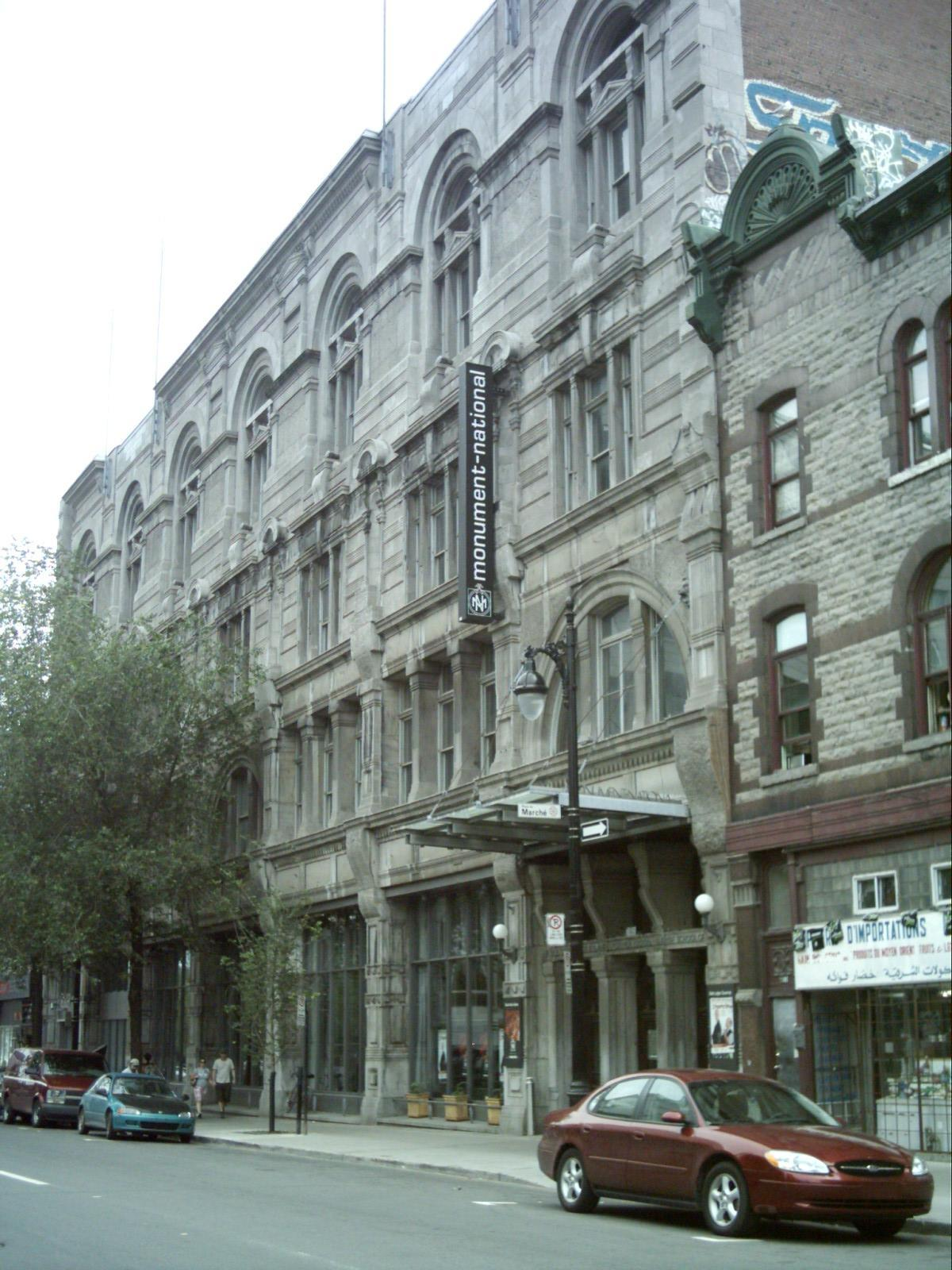
The Monument-National in 2008

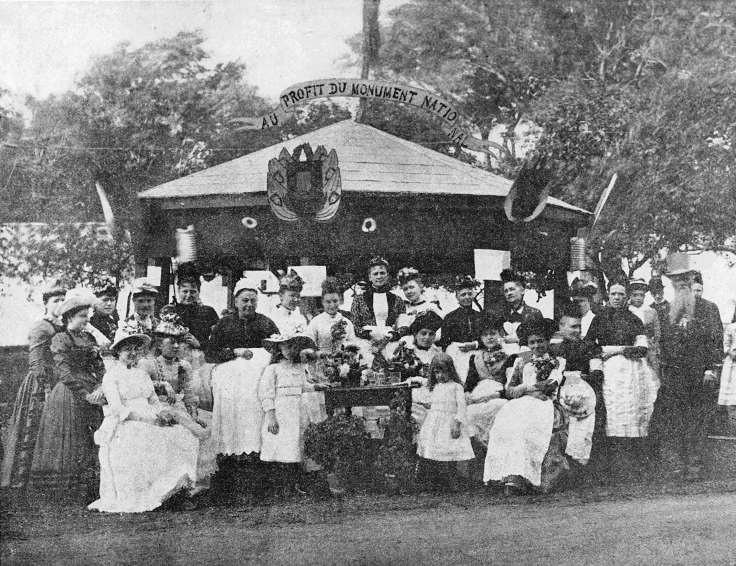
A fundraising event in 1890 for the construction of the Monument-National

The Monument-National (French pronunciation: [mɔnymɑ̃ nɑsjɔnal]) is an historic Canadian theatre located at 1182 Saint Laurent Boulevard in Montreal, Quebec. With a capacity of over 1,600 seats, the venue was erected between 1891 and 1894 (132 years ago) and was originally the cultural centre of the Saint-Jean-Baptiste Society.

The building was designed by Maurice Perrault, Albert Mesnard, and Joseph Venne in the Renaissance Revival style and utilizes a steel frame—a building technique that was innovative for its time.

== Yiddish theatre ==
The first performance of a Yiddish play was held there in what is now the theatre's Ludger-Duvernay room in the winter of 1896. The Monument-National was a key cultural landmark in Montreal's historic Jewish quarter, and it continued to host productions from touring and local Yiddish theatre companies until the 1940s.

== Renovations and current status ==
The theatre was declared a historic monument by the Ministère des Affaires culturelles du Québec in 1976 and a National Historic Site in 1985.

A major restoration project of the theatre was completed in June 1993 in time for the theatre's centennial celebration. The 1,620-seat theatre has been owned by the National Theatre School of Canada since 1971, and it is the venue used for its productions.
