= Enfield (CDP), New Hampshire =

Census-designated place in New Hampshire, United States

Enfield, New Hampshire
- Census-designated place
- Location within New Hampshire Location within the United States
- Coordinates: 43°38′26″N 72°08′11″W
- Country: United States
- State: New Hampshire
- County: Grafton
- Town: Enfield

Area
  - Total: 2.63 sq mi (6.82 km^{2})
  - Land: 2.58 sq mi (6.68 km^{2})
  - Water: 0.054 sq mi (0.14 km^{2})
- Elevation: 817 ft (249 m)

Population (2020)
  - Total: 1,571
  - Density: 609.4/sq mi (235.29/km^{2})
- Time zone: UTC-5 (Eastern (EST))
  - Summer (DST): UTC-4 (EDT)
- ZIP code: 03748
- Area code: 603
- FIPS code: 33-24260
- GNIS feature ID: 2378061

Enfield is a census-designated place (CDP) and the main village in the town of Enfield, New Hampshire, United States. The population of the CDP was 1,571 at the 2020 census, out of 4,465 in the entire town.

== Geography ==
The CDP is in the northwestern corner of the town of Enfield, on the north side of Mascoma Lake where the Mascoma River enters it. The CDP is bordered to the south by Mascoma Lake, as far as Rainer Road on the east side of the lake; to the west by the city of Lebanon; to the north by the town of Canaan; and to the east by Shaker Boulevard, Wescott Road, and the Northern Rail Trail running east to the Canaan line.

U.S. Route 4 passes through the community, leading east 7 miles (11 km) to Canaan village and west the same distance to the center of Lebanon.

According to the U.S. Census Bureau, the Enfield CDP has a total area of 2.63 square miles (6.82 km^{2}), of which 2.58 square miles (6.68 km^{2}) are land and 0.05 square miles (0.14 km^{2}), or 2.12%, are water.

== Demographics ==
Historical population
Census	Pop.	Note	%±
1950	1,111		—
1960	1,121		0.9%
1970	1,408		25.6%
1980	1,581		12.3%
1990	1,560		−1.3%
2000	1,698		8.8%
2010	1,540		−9.3%
2020	1,571		2.0%
U.S. Decennial Census

As of the census of 2010, there were 1,540 people, 712 households, and 419 families residing in the CDP. There were 787 housing units, of which 75, or 9.5%, were vacant. The racial makeup of the town was 96.4% white, 0.6% African American, 0.1% Native American or Alaska Native, 0.5% Asian, 0.4% some other race, and 1.9% from two or more races. 1.4% of the population were Hispanic or Latino of any race.

Of the 712 households, 28.1% had children under the age of 18 living with them, 40.7% were headed by married couples living together, 13.1% had a female householder with no husband present, and 41.2% were non-families. 34.1% of all households were made up of individuals, and 10.0% were someone living alone who was 65 years of age or older. The average household size was 2.16, and the average family size was 2.75.

21.4% of the population were under the age of 18, 8.2% were from age 18 to 24, 27.6% were 25 to 44, 27.5% were 45 to 64, and 15.3% were 65 years of age or older. The median age was 39.7 years. For every 100 females, there were 89.0 males. For every 100 females age 18 and over, there were 86.7 males.

For the period 2011–2015, the estimated median annual income for a household in the CDP was $75,313, and the median income for a family was $91,369. Male full-time workers had a median income of $47,950 versus $42,841 for females. The per capita income for the CDP was $49,008.
