= St. Anthony of Padua Church (New Bedford, Massachusetts) =

Coordinates: 41°39′43.24″N 70°55′41.08″W

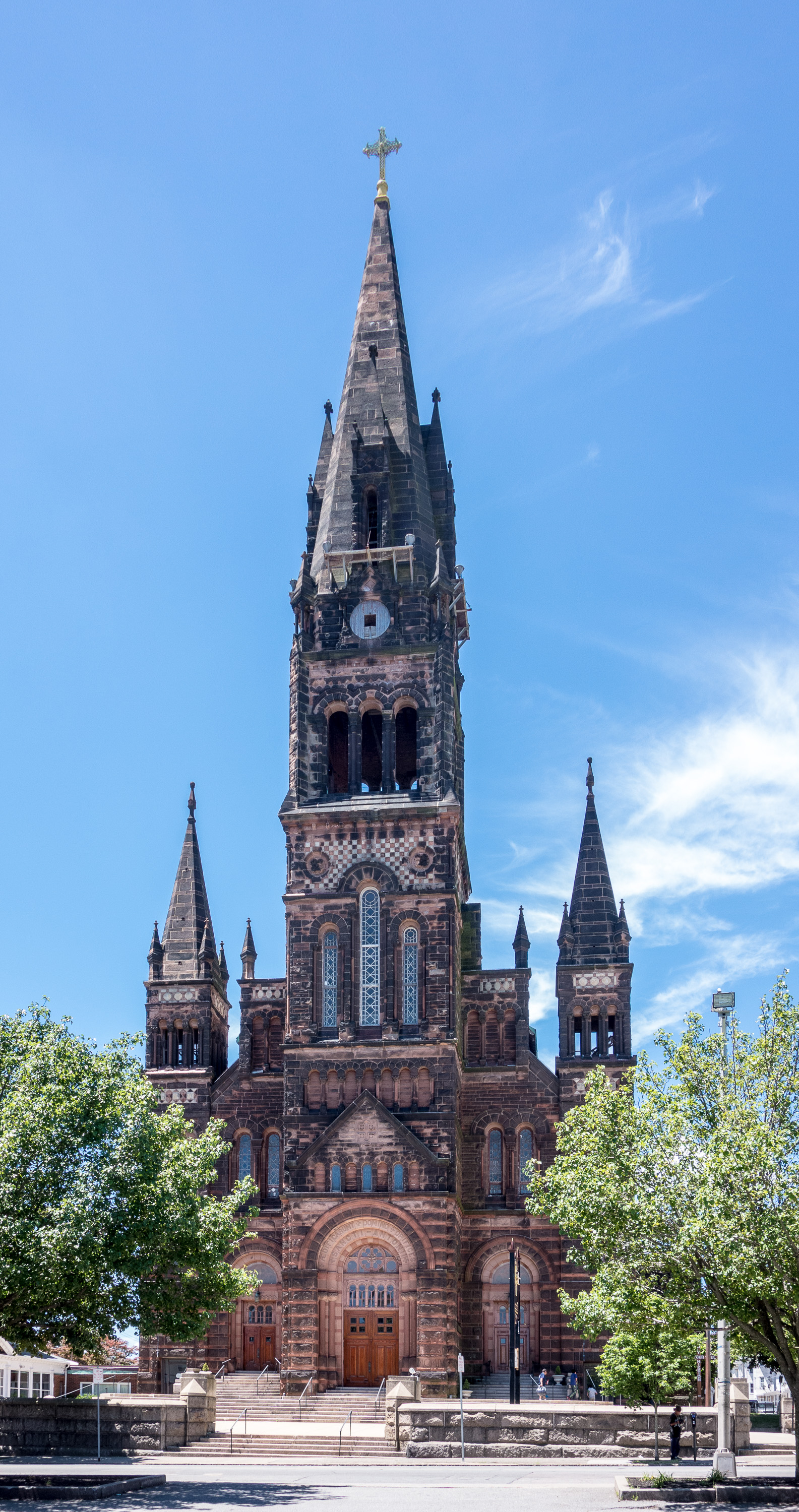
- St. Anthony of Padua Church
- Location: 1350 Acushnet Avenue; New Bedford, Massachusetts
- Country: United States
- Denomination: Roman Catholic

History
- Founded: 1895
- Founder: Rev. Hormisdas Deslauiers
- Dedicated: 1912

Architecture
- Architect(s): Joseph Venne principal architect Louis G. Destremps supervising architect

Administration
- Province: Boston
- Diocese: Fall River

Clergy
- Bishop: Most Rev. Edgar M. da Cunha

St. Anthony of Padua is a Roman Catholic church in New Bedford, Massachusetts, part of the Diocese of Fall River.

== History ==
St. Anthony of Padua was founded in 1895 to serve the needs of French Canadian Catholics who lived in the North End of New Bedford. The new parish was under the care of first pastor, Fr. Hormisdas Deslauriers (1861–1916), an energetic leader who would have great influence on the parishes future development. The first mass was celebrated on Oct 6th 1895 at ‘’North Union Hall’’ on Bullard Street. Shortly thereafter a two-story wood-frame church was dedicated on March 8, 1896.

== Building ==
The present Romanesque style church was begun in 1902 when the parish acquired plans from Canadian architect Joseph Venne of Montreal. The cornerstone for the new building was laid in June 1904 and work began on shortly thereafter. On September 20, 1904, several construction workers were seriously injured and one killed when a 50-foot wall collapsed at the construction site.

After the accident the original contractor, Michael J. Houlihan of Providence, Rhode Island, withdrew from the project and noted Fall River architect Louis G. Destremps was brought in as supervising architect. The church exterior was completed in December 1905 and the lower church was available for masses by 1908. The upper portion of the church, though not yet ready for religious service was opened for public viewing on January 17, 1909. The period of 1909-1912 was largely taken up by extensive interior decoration and the installation of a large Casavant pipe organ. The finished church was formally dedicated on November 28, 1912.

The exterior is of red sandstone from East Longmeadow, Massachusetts. The spire is 256 feet high, the second-tallest in New England after the Cathedral of Saint Joseph in Hartford, Connecticut. The building is 241 feet long and 80 feet wide (135 feet wide at the transept). It seats 2,000 worshipers and several thousand more standing. The outline of the church can be seen for miles around and dominates the skyline of North New Bedford.

== The work of John Castagnoli (1908-1912) ==
Much of the interior decoration was accomplished between 1908 and 1912 by Italian sculptor John Castagnoli (1863–1914), Castagnoli was born in Borgo Val di Taro Italy, near Parma, and studied in Florence. Other examples of his work can be found in various churches in Canada, a cathedral Berlin, New Hampshire, Notre Dame Church and Blessed Sacrament Church, both in Fall River, Massachusetts.

One of Castagnoli's most significant contributions was the design of 32 enormous angel statues some of which are 20 feet tall. These statues are located throughout the church. The faces of the angels come from parishioners of St. Anthony Church.

== Joseph Venne ==
Joseph Venne was an important Canadian architect of the late 19th early 20th century who designed many important buildings in his native country and was active in the establishment of the first Institute of architects in Canada. He also designed three large and important catholic churches in the United States. The first of these is St. Anthony, New Bedford. He would later design the Notre Dame Church of Southbridge, Massachusetts, also for a French congregation. Notre Dame is listed on the National Register of Historic Places. He also designed a church in Adams, Massachusetts.

== The 1952 renovation by Guido Nicheri ==
In 1952 an extensive renovation of the church was conducted under the direction of Italian architect and artist Guido Nincheri who was living in Rhode Island at the time. The original pulpit, which had been designed by Castagnoli was replaced with one designed by Nincheri and built by the Del Bono Arte Del Marno company of Italy. Nincheri also added several stained glass windows and paintings of each of the four evangelists.

== The 1990s and Fr. Edmond Levesque ==
By 1990 the once grand church had fallen on hard times. In 1991 Bishop Daniel A. Cronin appointed Fr. Edmond R. Levesque pastor of the beleaguered church telling him at the time that unless Father Levesque could reverse the pattern of decline, that St. Anthony Church would have to be closed. Over the next several years Fr. Levesque, with the aid of his housekeeper Patricia DeAndrade, was able to restore the church to its former grandeur and revitalize the parish community.

== Casavant organ ==
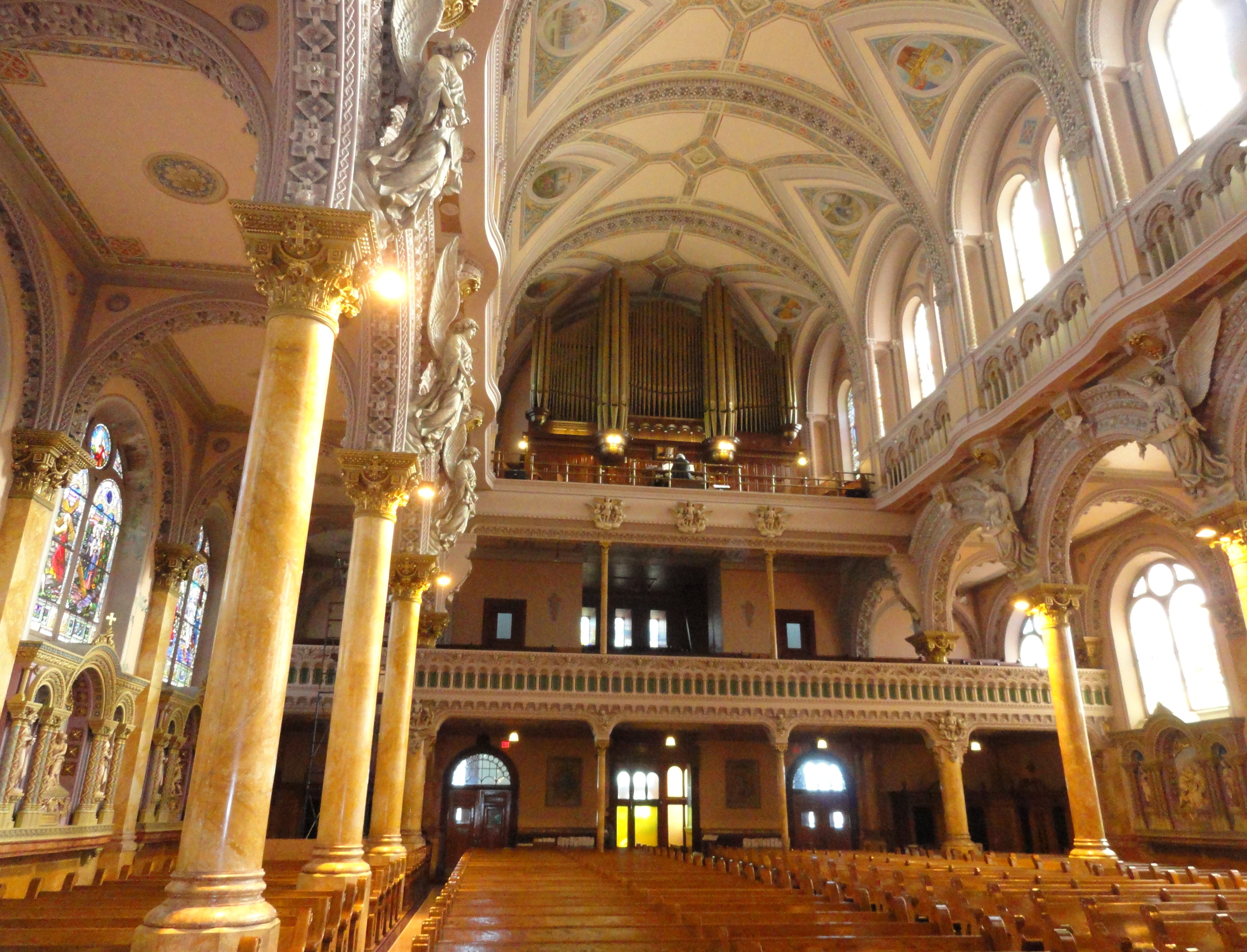
St. Anthony Church, New Bedford, Massachusetts interior, notice the 1912 Casavant pipe organ

St. Anthony of Padua church is home to a large 4 manual pipe organ built in 1912 by Casavant Frères of Saint-Hyacinthe, Quebec, as their Opus 489. The organ enjoys an especially favorable placement in the church being installed in the unusual second balcony some 70 feet above the floor. It was dedicated on September 12, 1912. Famous Belgian organist Gaston Dethier performed the dedicatory recital.

This instrument remains essentially intact, and was partially restored in 2005 by Daniel Lemieux & Associates. In recent years the church has sponsored a series of recitals on this instrument and it has been used for the commercial recording Pipes and Angels.

== School ==
In September 1896 its parish school, which was a K-8 school at the end of its life, opened. Its final school building opened in September 1924. It closed in 2007.

Its student enrollment count went from 1,060 in 1924 to 1,406 in 1931, its peak, and then 116 in its final year.
