= Anti-Shakerism =

Overview of discrimination against Shakers

Anti-Shakerism refers to negative attitudes concerning the Shakers. At their peak in popularity in the first half of the 19th century in the United States, the Shakers had approximately 4,000 to 6,000 members. Anti-Shakerist critiques of Shakers often concerned their celibacy, millenarianism, and views on race and gender. Anti-Shakerism declined along with Shakerism in the 20th century.

== Issues ==
Perhaps most significant to the hostility towards Shakers concerned their celibacy, millenarianism, and views on race and gender. The main current writer on anti-Shakerism compares allegations against them as similar to other celibate religious groups like Roman Catholic monks and nuns, although there are also similarities with hostility to Mormons or Masons. People who formerly resided in Shaker communities even wrote anti-Shaker tracts as some former, or allegedly former, nuns did.

Their millenarian views drew ire. Under Joseph Meachem, beliefs concerning God coming to destroy the Anti-Christ and create a better world grew more pronounced. The Shaker convert Frederick W. Evans in 1888 wrote an essay, based more on his enthusiasm than mainstream Shakerism, called a Shaker reconstruction of the American Government. In it he exclaims such a reconstruction event would cause poverty to disappear. Other individual Shakers proclaimed messages of joy or disaster were given to them by God or spirits. Even if none of this had official acceptance, some blamed Shakerism and took these events to mean the Shakers had occult aspects that inspired domination or damnation of the lands they settled.

The Shakers were among the first groups to refer to God as Father/Mother or to alternatively refer to God as Mother sometimes while referring to God as Father at other times. They viewed God as a duality containing God the Father and a feminine Holy Spirit. This dualist and half-feminine view of God put them radically out of the mainstream. In reality Shaker women largely conformed to 19th century expectations of domesticated femininity and left much of the financial aspect to Shaker men, but their official equality and leadership roles aroused suspicion. Shakers appeared for the time to be radical on women's issues, and the elevation of Mother Ann Lee as a crucial part of the Second Coming outraged mainstream Christians as being blasphemous.

They tended to believe in racial equality and harmony although in ways that may be regarded as condescending today. For example, songs said to be "inspired by American Indian spirits" tended to involve stereotyped pidgin English like "Me love Mother and she love me, Quille ose van da wahaw me!" (notebook from their Golden Harvest CD). Still these beliefs caused them the most violence as it encouraged them to harbor fugitive slaves or American Indians.

== Apostate literature ==
A strong source of literature hostile to a religion or group comes from former members or apostates. This is as true of Shakerism as it is of other groups. In the case of apostate Shakers there are strong similarities between their tracts and those written by ex-nuns or ex-Mormons.

The most significant Shaker apostate writer was likely Mary Marshall Dyer whose anti-Shaker efforts ran from 1815 to 1852. In 1813 she had joined the Shakers of Enfield, New Hampshire, with her husband and family. However two years later she left, blaming them for alienating her from her children. Despite that her husband and her family decided to stay. After that she did tours and wrote tracts against the Shakers. Her main are A Brief Statement of the Sufferings of Mary Dyer and A Portraiture of Shakerism in 1822. She also got a group together to enter the Enfield Shaker Community to take her children back, but this effort failed. Her husband Joseph remained devout to the community and criticized her in strong terms. Only one of her five children ever left the Shakers and he never became close to her. By the 1850s her anti-Shaker views seemed extreme, in New England at least, and she died as a largely forgotten figure in 1867.

== 20th century ==
During the 20th century the Shakers went into significant decline, so hostility to Shakerism did as well. Although never a large denomination, their influence was significant due to their skills at seed businesses and their general productivity. However, technology and culture changed so by the 1970s membership had been reduced to a scattering of elderly women and men.

This decline led even ex-Shakers to view them in relatively positive terms. This began in the 1860s, as toward the end of her life Mary Dyer had difficulty making friends among apostate Shakers. They viewed her as too harsh, and her son never reconnected with her, furthering the discomfort with her. As the group declined further most viewed them as being, at worst, sexually repressed eccentrics who at least made nice furniture. A more common view saw them as quaint or even idyllic.

There remain small elements of the Christian countercult movement that still hold Shakers as an example of a cult. Robert S. Liichow links it more to real or perceived New-Age cults. Lastly, some find the term "Shaker" itself a pejorative one and that the proper term is "The United Society of Believers in Christ's Second Appearing," although as with the Quakers, that issue appears largely to have ebbed.

As part of its open canon of Doctrine and Covenants, The Church of Jesus Christ of Latter-day Saints retains an 1831 revelation of Joseph Smith that denounces Shaker beliefs.
