= Our Lady of Czestochowa Parish, Turners Falls =

Coordinates: 42°11′.3″N 72°21′19.5″W

Our Lady of Czestochowa Parish
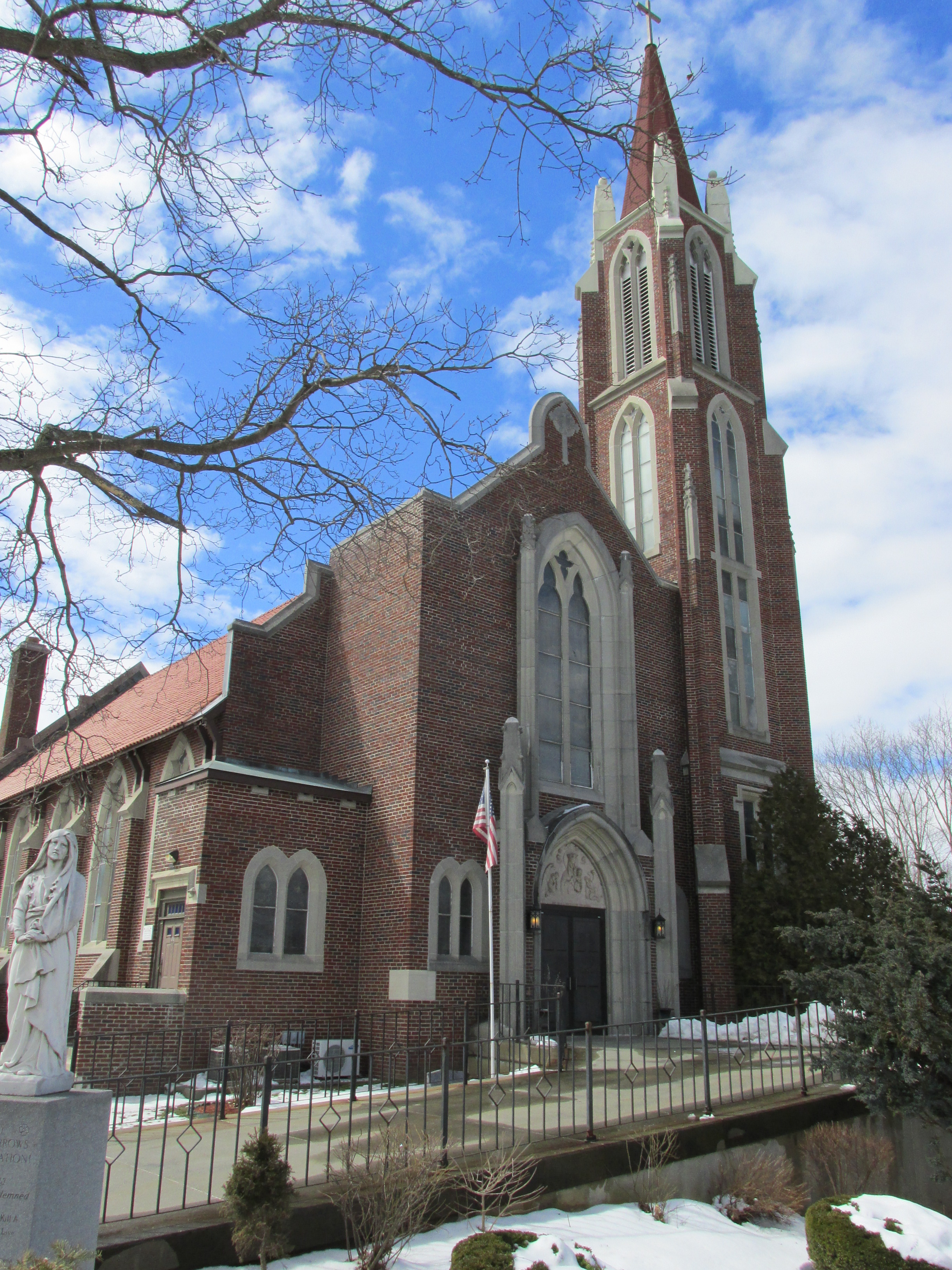
- Our Lady of Czestochowa Parish
- Our Lady of Czestochowa Parish
- Location: 84 K Street; Turners Falls, Massachusetts
- Country: United States
- Denomination: Roman Catholic
- Website: Chroniclesofcestochowa.webs.com

History
- Founded: 1909
- Founder: Polish immigrants
- Dedication: Our Lady of Czestochowa

Administration
- Division: Region 4
- Province: Boston
- Diocese: Springfield in Massachusetts

Clergy
- Bishop: Most Rev. William Byrne
- Pastor: Rev. Sean O'Mannion

Our Lady of Czestochowa Parish - designated for Polish immigrants in Turners Falls, Massachusetts, United States.

Founded 1909, it is one of the Polish-American Roman Catholic parishes in New England in the Diocese of Springfield in Massachusetts. The architect for the church was Donat R. Baribault of Springfield, MA

== Bibliography ==
- The 150th Anniversary of Polish-American Pastoral Ministry. Webster, Massachusetts: St. Joseph Basilica. September 11, 2005.
- The Official Catholic Directory in USA
