= Montcalm, New Hampshire =

Unincorporated community in New Hampshire, United States

- Unincorporated community
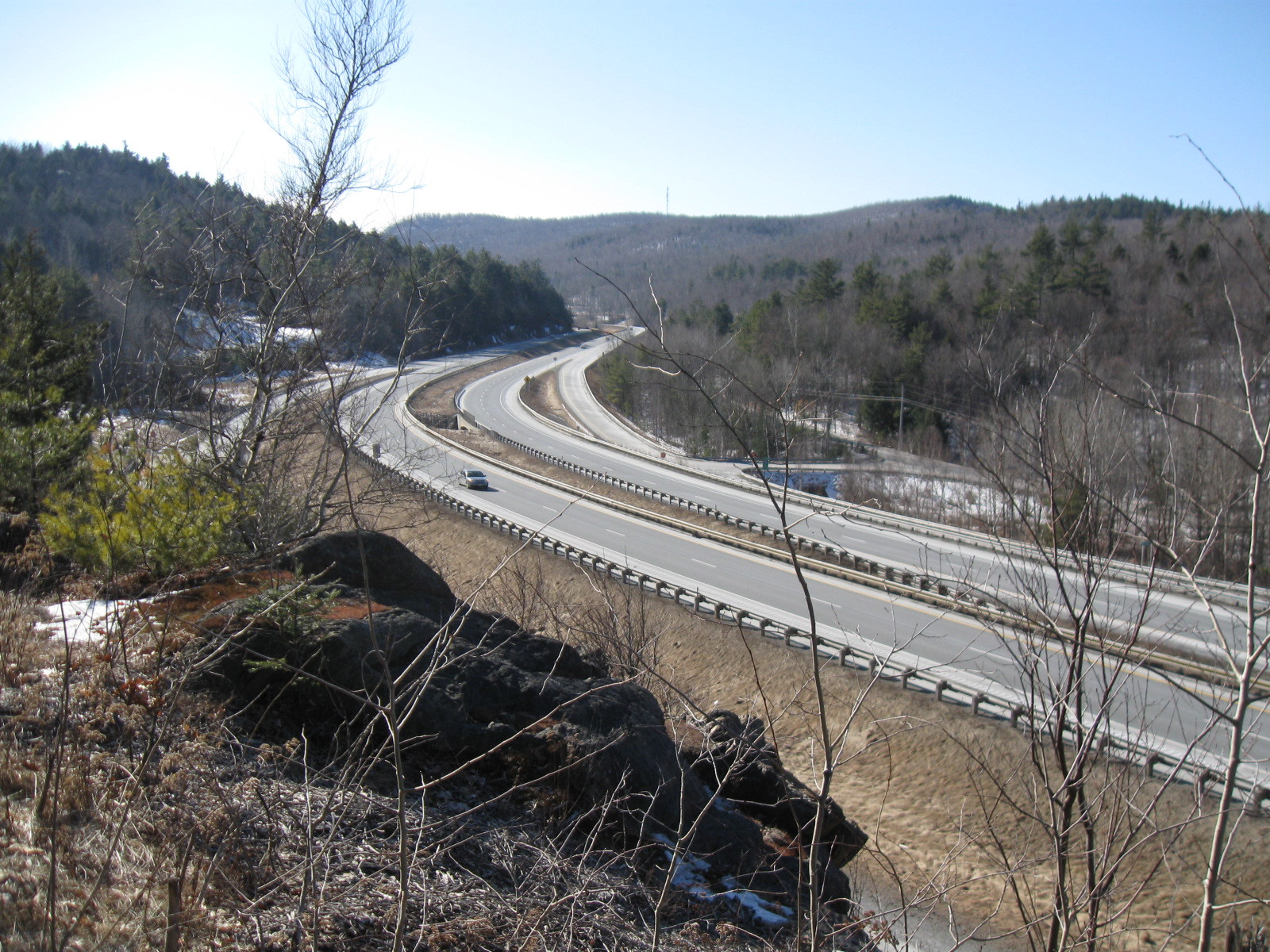
- Exit 15 (Montcalm) on Interstate 89

- Location within New Hampshire Location within the United States
- Coordinates: 43°36′00″N 72°10′13″W
- Country: United States
- State: New Hampshire
- County: Grafton
- Town: Enfield
- Elevation: 1,214 ft (370 m)
- Time zone: UTC-5 (Eastern (EST))
  - Summer (DST): UTC-4 (EDT)
- Area code: 603
- GNIS feature ID: 1917586

Montcalm is an unincorporated community in the town of Enfield in Grafton County, New Hampshire, United States. It is located along a portion of old New Hampshire Route 10 that remains after most of the road was replaced by Interstate 89. The stretch of old road is only accessible from Exit 15 on I-89; in both directions from the exit the old road reaches a dead end. (Present-day Route 10 follows Interstate 89 in a concurrency through this area.) The elevation is 1,211 feet (369 m) above sea level.

The name "Montcalm" was chosen by Enfield's selectmen in 1960 when the construction of I-89 was in the planning stages, to replace the name "South Notch" that had been proposed by state highway engineers. Montcalm had once been the name of a settlement in the area which had had its own post office and school.
