= St. Joseph's Church (Springfield, Massachusetts) =

Historic church in Massachusetts, United States

- U.S. National Register of Historic Places
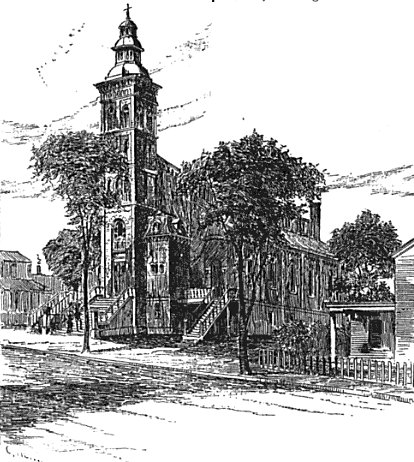
- Engraving of church in 1884

- Location within Massachusetts Location within the United States
- Location: Howard St. and E. Columbus Ave., Springfield, Massachusetts
- Coordinates: 42°5′52″N 72°35′16″W
- Area: less than one acre
- Built: 1873
- Architect: Gagnier, Friar
- Architectural style: Romanesque
- MPS: Downtown Springfield MRA
- NRHP reference No.: 83002999
- Added to NRHP: February 24, 1983

St. Joseph's Church was an historic Roman Catholic church at Howard Street and East Columbus Avenue in Springfield, Massachusetts. Built in 1873-77, it was a brick Romanesque Revival structure with brownstone trim, and was a fine local example of the style. It was the city's first church to specifically serve its French Canadian immigrant and French American population. The building was listed on the National Register of Historic Places in 1983. It was demolished in 2008.

== Description and history ==
St. Joseph's was located in downtown Springfield, at the southeast corner of Howard Street and East Columbus Avenue, a site now occupied by a commercial building. It was a large single-story structure, built out of red brick with brownstone trim. It had a combination of Gothic and Romanesque elements, including buttressed walls and round-arch windows between the buttresses. The gabled roof included a central clerestory, and a multistage square tower rose from the front of the church to a series of octagonal sections capped by a cross.

The first Roman Catholic parish in western Massachusetts was established in 1860, at St. Michael's in Springfield. The Diocese of Springfield in Massachusetts was organized in 1870 to better serve the growing Catholic population in the Pioneer Valley. The French Catholics of St. Michael's (predominantly French Canadian immigrants) pushed for establishment of a parish dedicated to their needs, and St. Joseph's was founded for that purpose in 1873. Friar Gagnier, who was from Quebec, is credited with designing the church, based on those he had seen in his homeland. Its basement was completed later in 1873, and services were held there until the entire building was completed in 1877.

The church was closed in 2005. In March 2008, the church, which had been sold the previous year by the diocese, was demolished by the Colvest Group.

== See also ==
- National Register of Historic Places listings in Springfield, Massachusetts
- National Register of Historic Places listings in Hampden County, Massachusetts
