= Centre Village Meeting House =

Historic church in New Hampshire, United States

- U.S. National Register of Historic Places
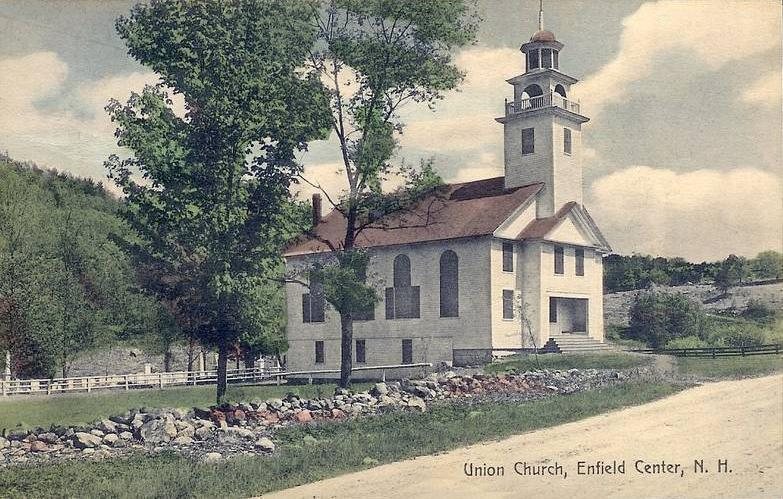

- Location within New Hampshire Location within the United States
- Location: NH 4A, Enfield Center, New Hampshire
- Coordinates: 43°35′24″N 72°6′38″W
- Area: 0.5 acres (0.20 ha)
- Built: 1836
- Architect: John Noyes
- NRHP reference No.: 85001197
- Added to NRHP: June 06, 1985

The Centre Village Meeting House (also known as Union Church of Enfield Center) is a historic meeting house (church) on New Hampshire Route 4A in Enfield Center, New Hampshire. Built in 1836, it is a well-preserved late example of Federal period church architecture, albeit with some Greek Revival stylistic elements. Then as now, it serves as a nondenominational building, serving a variety of small Christian congregations. The building was listed on the National Register of Historic Places in 1985.

== Description and history ==
The Centre Village Meeting House is located in the village of Enfield Center, a linear village extending along NH 4A near the geographic center of the town of Enfield. It is located on the north side of the road, oriented with its gable end facing the street. It is 1½ stories in height, with a gabled roof and clapboarded exterior. A gabled entry vestibule shelters the main entrances, which are set in the main wall recessed behind a wide rectangular opening trimmed with pilasters. The vestibule gable and main gable are both pedimented, and a three-stage square tower rises to an octagonal open cupola. The interior is simply finished, with slip pews and a Victorian-era arrangement of furnishings on the main dais.

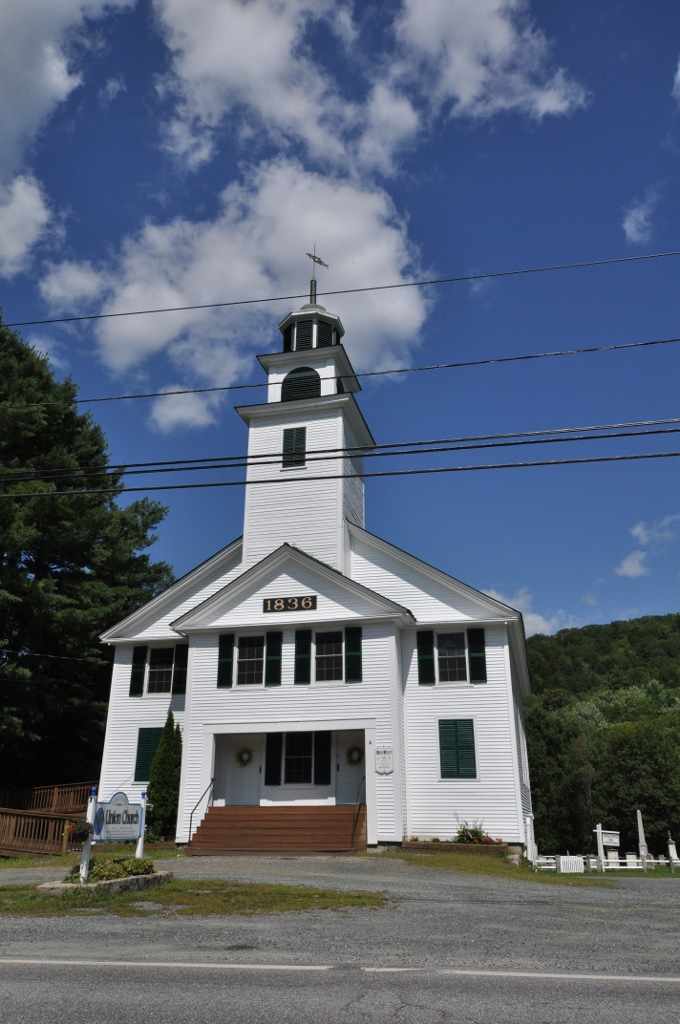
The church in 2013

The church was built in 1836 by local workmen, whose work was probably inspired by Asher Benjamin's 1797 A Country Builder's Assistant. The design was embellished, however, with Greek Revival details, and also simplified in some ways in the interest of economy. The building was paid for by the subscription purchase of pews, and was used for interdenominational worship, because no single denomination (Congregationalist, Methodist, and Unitarian) held a controlling number of pews. The tower bell was acquired in 1870, funded by a special subscription. The building is little altered since its construction.

== See also ==
- National Register of Historic Places listings in Grafton County, New Hampshire
