= Mascoma Lake =

Lake in New Hampshire, United States

- Mascoma Lake, February 2005

- Location within New Hampshire Location within the United States
- Location: Grafton County, New Hampshire
- Coordinates: 43°37′20″N 72°8′27″W
- Primary inflows: Mascoma River; Knox River
- Primary outflows: Mascoma River
- Basin countries: United States
- Max. length: 4.2 mi (6.8 km)
- Max. width: 0.7 mi (1.1 km)
- Surface area: 1,165 acres (4.71 km^{2})
- Average depth: 30 ft (9.1 m)
- Max. depth: 68 ft (21 m)
- Surface elevation: 748 ft (228 m)
- Islands: Wood Island; Relhan Island; North Island
- Settlements: Enfield; Lebanon (village of Mascoma)

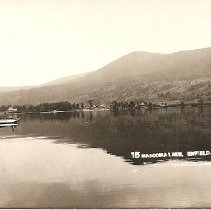
MASCOMA LAKE, ENFIELD, N.H.; ca. 1906; Enfield Shaker Museum

Mascoma Lake is a 1,158-acre (469 ha) lake in western New Hampshire, United States. Most of the lake is within the town of Enfield, while a small portion is within the city of Lebanon, where it drains into the Mascoma River, a tributary of the Connecticut River.

The lake's general trend is from southeast to northwest, with the outlet at the northwestern end. The Mascoma River enters the lake near its halfway point, from the northeastern side, at the town center of Enfield. The southeastern end of the lake is fed by the Knox River. The lake's average depth is 30 feet (9.1 m) with a maximum depth of 68 feet (21 m).

The lake freezes during winter and is stable enough to be walked upon. Ice fishing is popular on the lake. The lake is stocked with trout by the New Hampshire Fish and Game Department.

Mascoma Lake often has a spring cyanobacteria bloom. Recent studies suggest that significant exposure to high levels of cyanobacteria producing toxins such as BMAA can cause amyotrophic lateral sclerosis (ALS). People living within half a mile of cyanobacterially contaminated lakes have had a 2.3 times greater risk of developing ALS than the rest of the population; people around Lake Mascoma had an up to 25 times greater risk of ALS than the expected incidence.

In June 2009 the State of New Hampshire discouraged people from recreation in some areas of the lake because of the bloom. Aside from the bloom, the lake is generally considered safe for swimming, and the town of Enfield maintains a public beach with a lifeguard on the lake.

NASA and its partners have used the frozen lake to test a robotic rover as a simulation of Antarctica.

Mascoma Lake is home to the Dartmouth College sailing team. A community sailing club called the Mascoma Sailing Club also uses the lake.

== See also ==
- Mount Assurance
- Enfield Shaker Museum
- List of lakes in New Hampshire
