= Enfield Shaker Museum =

- Enfield Shaker Historic District
- U.S. National Register of Historic Places
- U.S. Historic district
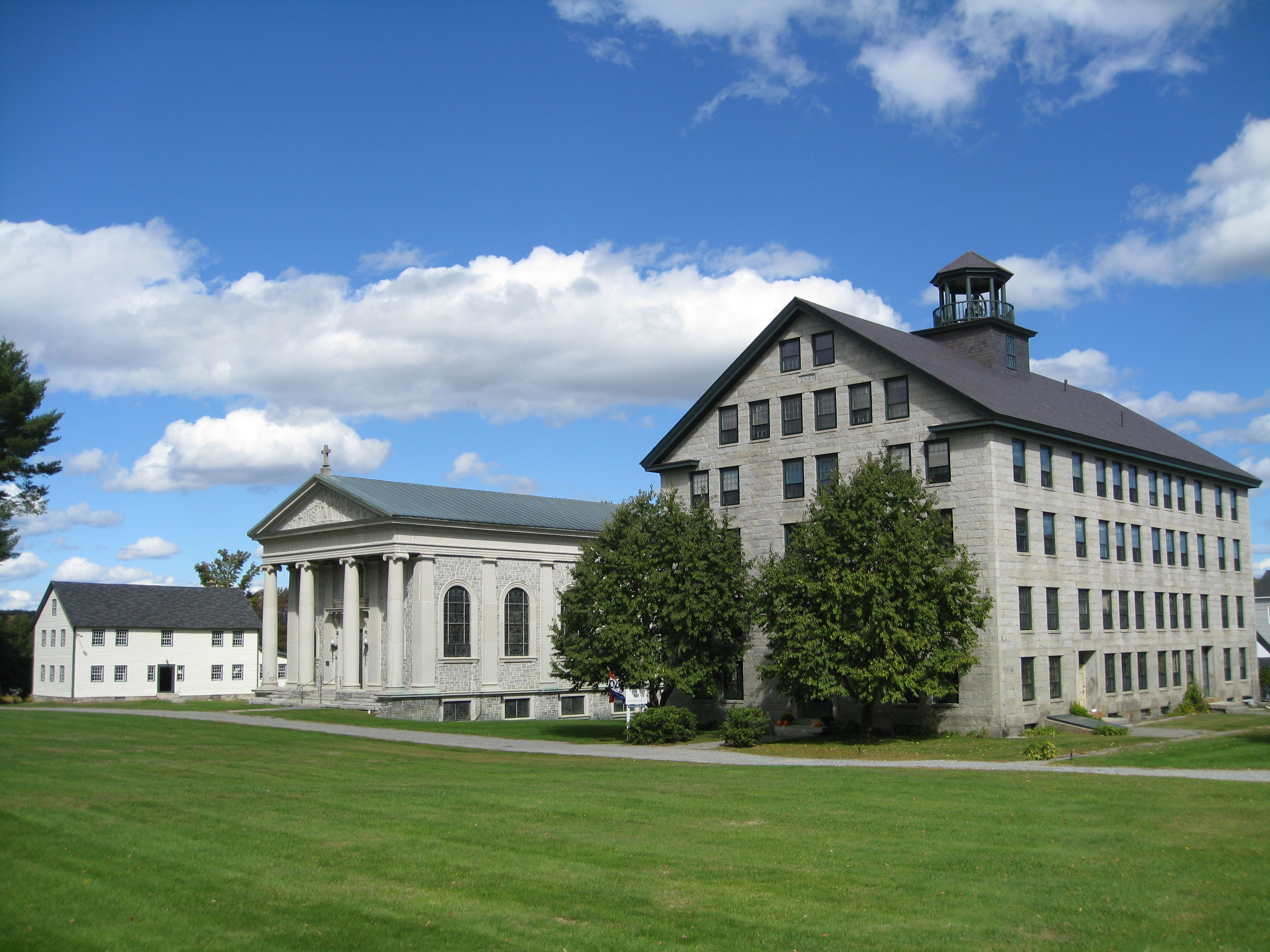
- The Great Stone Dwelling, Mary Keane Chapel and West Brethren Shop (right to left)

- Location within New Hampshire Location within the United States
- Location: NH Route 4A, Enfield, New Hampshire, U.S.
- Coordinates: 43°37′13″N 72°8′49″W
- Area: 1,235 acres (500 ha)
- NRHP reference No.: 79000198
- Added to NRHP: November 7, 1979

Shaker community
- Community: Enfield Shaker Village, New Hampshire
- Dates: 1793-1923
- Bishopric: Canterbury
- Spiritual name: Chosen Vale
- Families: Church, North, South
- Maximum population: 297 in 1840

The Enfield Shaker Museum is an outdoor history museum and historic district in Enfield, New Hampshire, in the United States. It is dedicated to preserving and sharing the history of the Shakers, a Protestant religious denomination, who lived on the site from 1793 to 1923. The museum features exhibitions, artifacts, eight Shaker buildings and restored Shaker gardens. It is located in a valley between Mount Assurance and Mascoma Lake in Enfield.

One of the buildings, the Great Stone Dwelling, was the largest residential building north of Boston and is the largest Shaker building. When the Shaker community closed, most of the land that made up the Enfield Shaker Village was sold to the Missionaries of La Salette. The state owns 28 acres (11 ha) and 13 buildings, which is now the Enfield Shaker Museum.

== Shakers ==
=== Village history ===
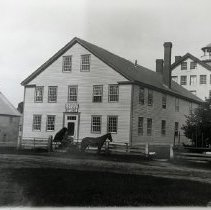
Church Family Trustees' Office with carriage in front; ca. 1890; Enfield Shaker Village, New Hampshire; Enfield Shaker Museum

The Shakers, or United Society of Believers in Christ's Second Appearing, settled on the site in 1793 along Lake Mascoma on up to 1,200 acres (490 ha). A meetinghouse was built May 1793 and a residential building was constructed in 1794. Subsequent buildings were made of granite with advanced stone masonry techniques, which was revolutionary for that time period. There were 132 members of the village by 1803, and by 1840 there were nearly 300 people.

Within the village was the largest Shaker dwelling and the largest residential dwelling north of Boston, the Great Stone Building. Built from 1837 to 1841 for the Church Family, it had four full stories and a total of six stories. Men and women lived in the building, but entered doors specific for their gender to separate quarters. It was designed by Ammi Burnham Young, who created the designs for the second state capitol in Vermont and was the first supervising architect for the United States Treasury. The granite stonework on the exterior and the slate roof were constructed by stonemasons from Boston. The Shaker brothers constructed the rest of the building themselves.

In 1849, the Shakers built the half-mile long Shaker Bridge that crossed a narrow portion of Lake Mascoma to the railroad line. In 1870, the elaborate Victorian and Shaker architectural Ministry shop was built to house the community's religious leaders. To support itself, the community made brooms, buckets, spinning wheels, tubs, dry measures and shirts. It also made and sold applesauce, maple syrup, herbs, medicines and seeds.

Like other Shaker communities, the Enfield Shaker village declined throughout the second half of the 19th century. In 1923, they closed the Enfield Shaker village and moved to the Canterbury community in central New Hampshire.

Much of the village property was sold in 1927 to the La Salettes. The site is listed on the U.S. National Register of Historic Places as the Enfield Shaker Historic District.

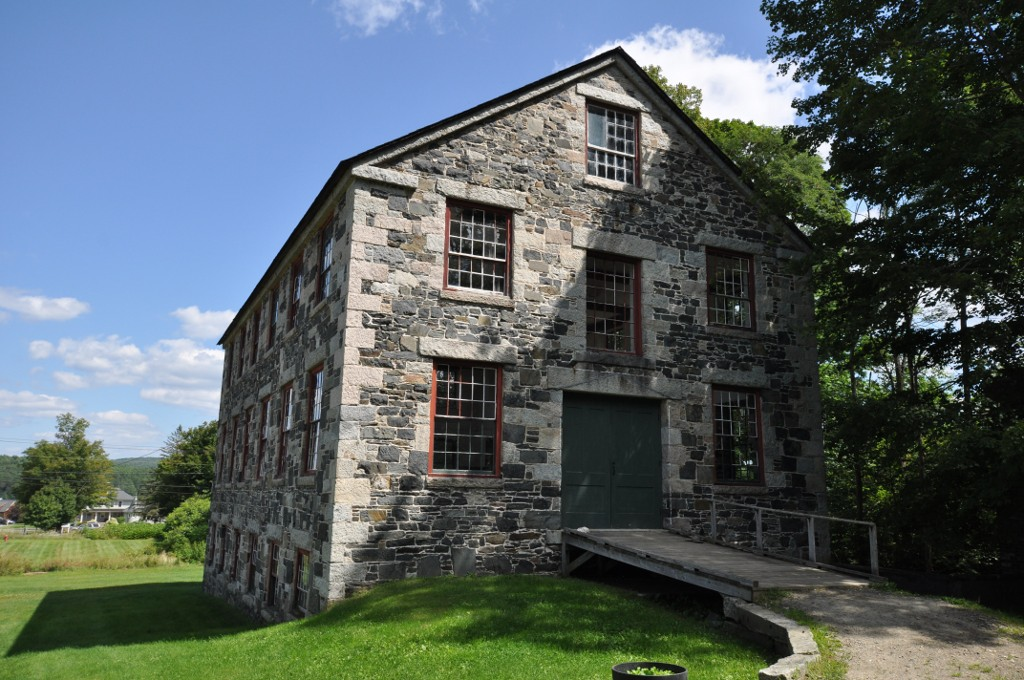
Brethren Stone Shop

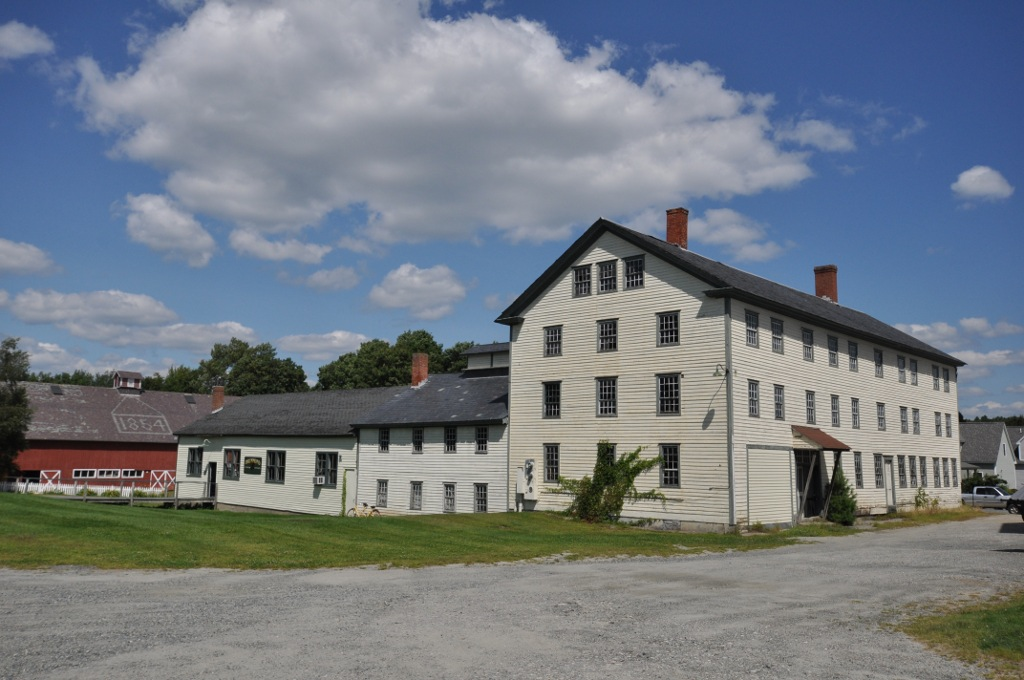
Laundry and Dairy buildings

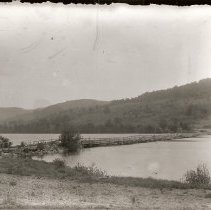
Shaker Bridge, 1889

=== Museum ===
Since 1986, the Enfield Shaker Museum has worked to preserve the Shaker heritage of the site without neglecting the 20th century history of the village. The Great Stone Dwelling houses the gift shop and the primary exhibition space. The museum is open 7 days a week, offering tours of the site, and offers overnight stays in the original Shaker bedrooms of the Great Stone Dwelling.

There are 13 remaining Shaker village buildings and gardens on 28 acres, which can be seen during a self-guided walking tour. The village museum is owned by the state of New Hampshire.

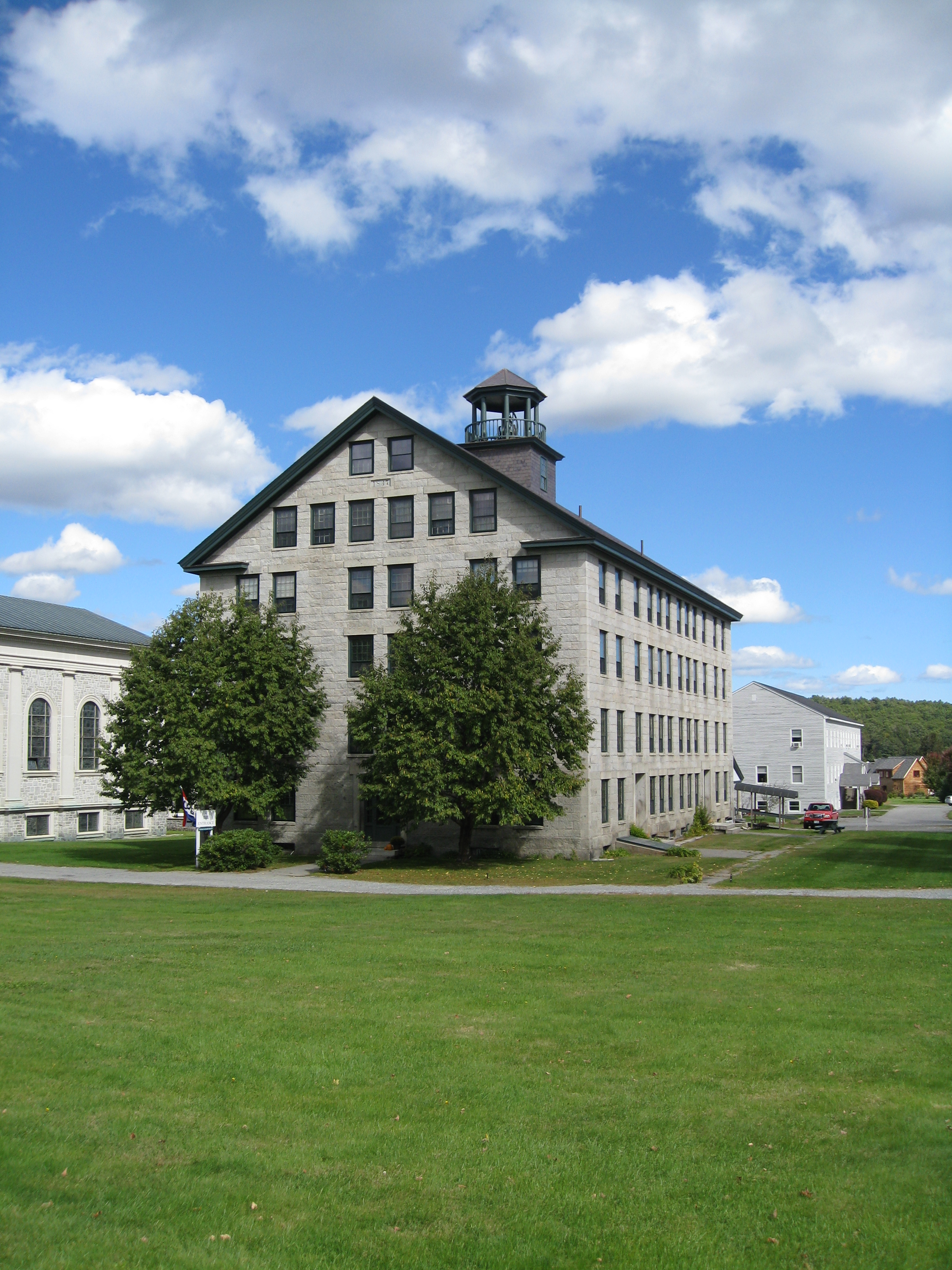
Great Stone Dwelling is where the museum, exhibition space, rooms for overnight stays, and the gift shop is located.

== Missionaries of La Salette ==
In 1927, the site was sold to the Missionaries of La Salette, who converted the site into a seminary for the Catholic priesthood, school and conference site. The La Salettes built in 1930 the Mary Keane Chapel, a neo-classical revival chapel, which is now part of the museum and open to visitors. The Missionaries of La Salette closed the seminary in 1974, and the center is now known as the Shrine of Our Lady of La Salette, which is a center of "reconciliation".

In 2020, the Missionaries of La Salette announced that the organization would be shutting down operations at the Enfield site, including the Marian shrine located on the eastern slope of Mount Assurance. Sale of the shrine and all accompanying real estate to the Enfield Shaker Museum was completed in July 2023.

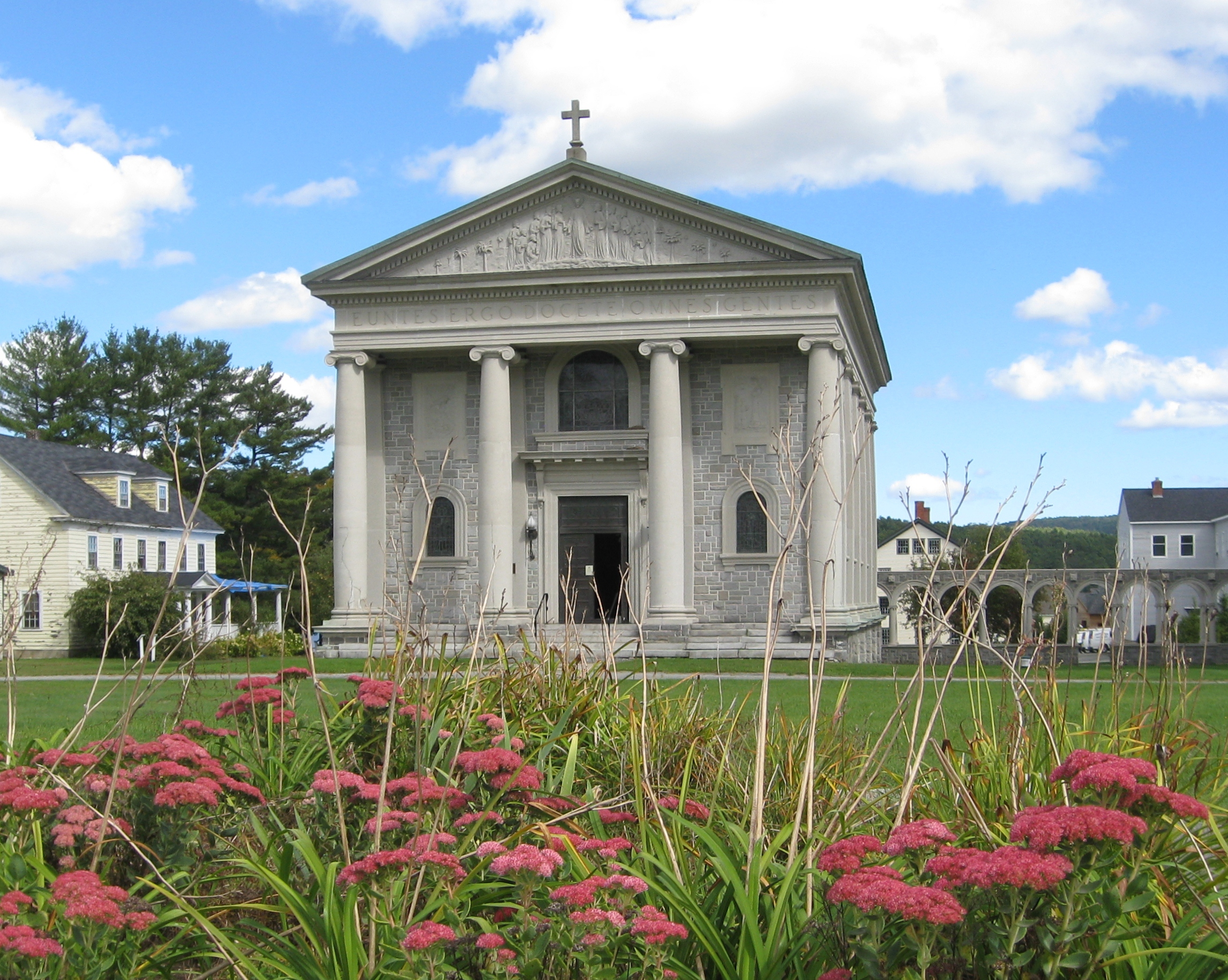
Mary Keane Chapel

== See also ==
- Enfield Village Historic District
- National Register of Historic Places listings in Grafton County, New Hampshire
- New Hampshire Historical Marker No. 202: The Enfield Shakers
- Shaker Seed Company
- Thomas Corbett (Shaker doctor)
