= Enfield, New Hampshire =

- Town
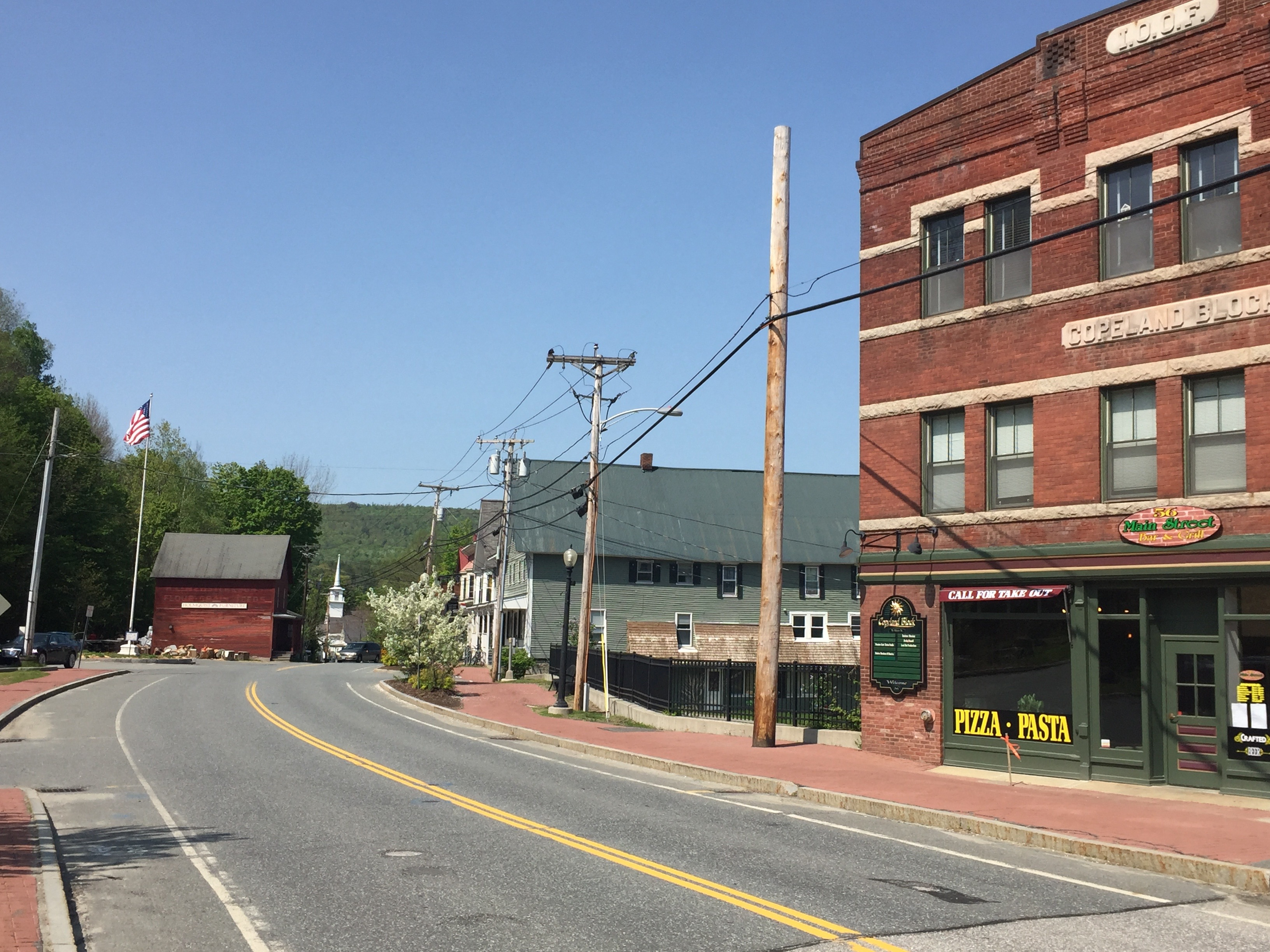
- Main Street in Enfield, 2016

- Seal

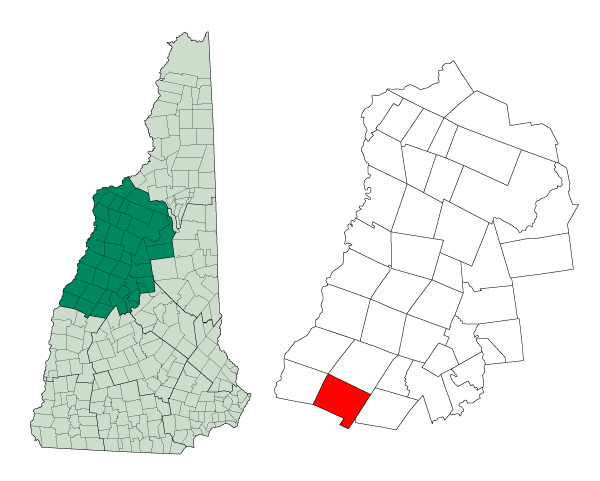
- Location in Grafton County, New Hampshire
- Coordinates: 43°35′52″N 72°06′58″W
- Country: United States
- State: New Hampshire
- County: Grafton
- Incorporated: 1761
- Villages: Enfield; Enfield Center; Fish Market; Lockehaven; Lower Shaker Village; Montcalm; Purmort; Upper Shaker Village

Area
  - Total: 43.2 sq mi (111.8 km^{2})
  - Land: 40.3 sq mi (104.4 km^{2})
  - Water: 2.9 sq mi (7.4 km^{2})
- Elevation: 784 ft (239 m)

Population (2020)
  - Total: 4,465
  - Density: 111/sq mi (42.8/km^{2})
- Time zone: UTC-5 (Eastern)
  - Summer (DST): UTC-4 (Eastern)
- ZIP code: 03748
- Area code: 603
- FIPS code: 33-24340
- GNIS feature ID: 873590
- Website: www.enfieldnh.gov

Enfield is a town in Grafton County, New Hampshire, United States. The population was 4,465 at the 2020 census. The town includes the villages of Enfield, Enfield Center, Upper Shaker Village, Lower Shaker Village, Lockehaven, and Montcalm.

Enfield village, the primary settlement in town, where 1,571 people resided at the 2020 census, is defined as the Enfield census-designated place (CDP), centered on U.S. Route 4 and the inlet of the Mascoma River into Mascoma Lake.

== History ==
The town was incorporated in 1761 by colonial Governor Benning Wentworth. First named "Enfield" by settlers from Enfield, Connecticut, the town was renamed "Relhan" in 1766 to honor Dr. Anthony Relhan (c. 1715–1776). The doctor was a promoter of sea-bathing as a curative, making Brighton, England, a fashionable resort. Following the American Revolution, the New Hampshire town was renamed Enfield in 1784.

The first European settlers in town were Jonathan Paddleford and family who arrived, after the successful conclusion of the French and Indian War, between 1765 and 1772.

On the southwest shore of Mascoma Lake is Enfield Shaker Village, once a utopian religious community of Shakers, renowned for simple and functional architecture and furniture. Established in 1793 and called "Chosen Vale", the village was subdivided into several "Families", with men and women leading pious, celibate and industrious lives. Although the genders shared dormitories, like Enfield's Great Stone Dwelling built between 1837 and 1841, the sexes used separate doors and stairways. They practiced ecstatic singing and dancing, an expression of their worship, which earned them the appellation of Shaking Quakers, or Shakers.

Several trades operated at the village, from agriculture and packaging of seeds, to the manufacture of brooms, brushes, spinning-wheels, and furniture. To speed delivery of products to the railroad across Mascoma Lake, in 1849 the community erected Shaker Bridge.

The Shaker movement crested in the 1840s, with 19 "societies" scattered from Maine to Kentucky and west to Indiana. But growing employment opportunities created by the Industrial Revolution, as near as the mill town of Lebanon, enticed away potential and practicing church members. Others grew disaffected with celibacy, self-abnegation, and communal ownership of property. Indeed, Mary Marshall Dyer, once a member of the Enfield church, became an outspoken Anti-Shaker. Eventually the village would close and, in 1927, be sold to the La Salette Brotherhood of Montreal, a Catholic order noted for its Christmas display. In 1986, Enfield Shaker Village was established as a museum on part of the historic property. The museum steadily expanded its footprint by purchases of key Shaker properties, culminating in the acquisition of all the remaining La Salette buildings and land in September 2023 when the Catholic order left Enfield.

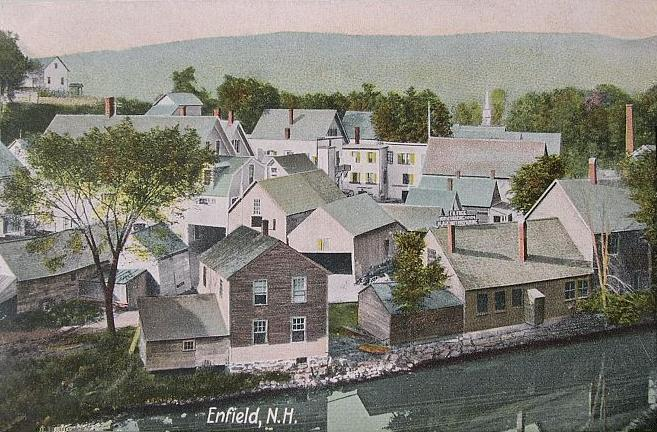
Enfield c. 1908

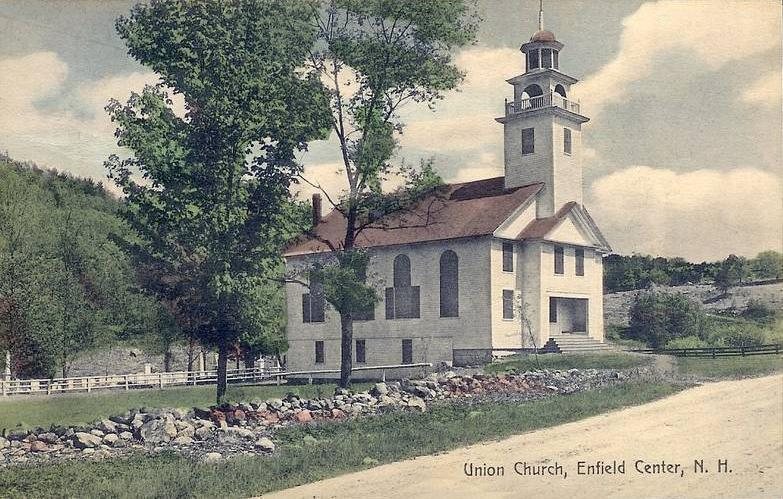
Centre Village Meeting House in 1909

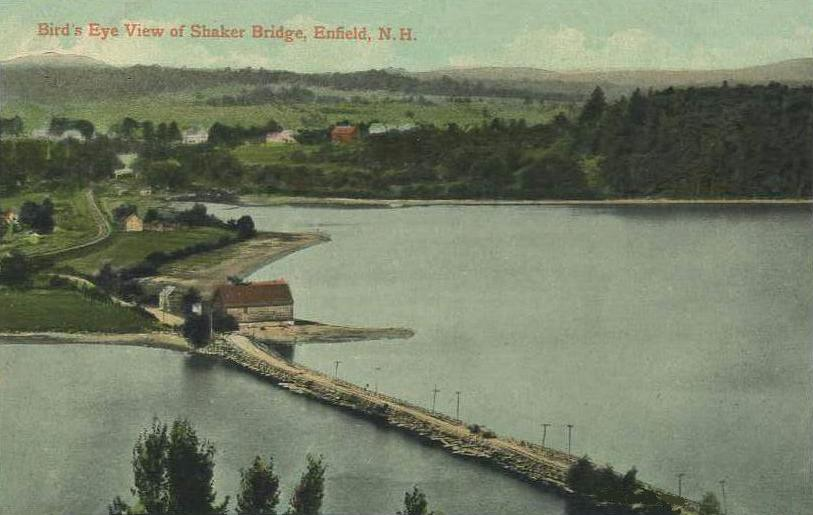
Shaker Bridge in 1908

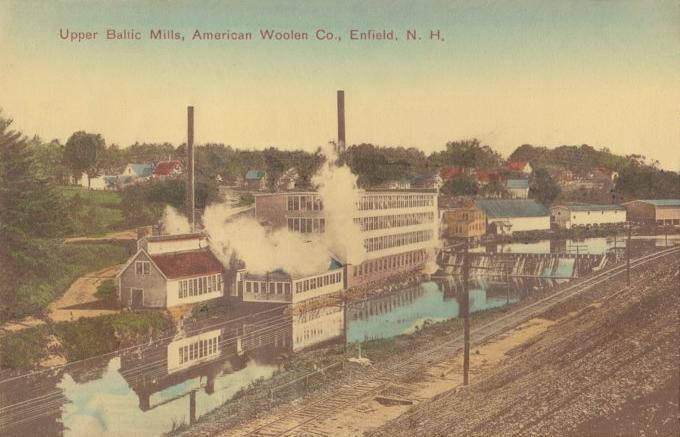
Baltic Mills in 1908

== Geography ==
According to the United States Census Bureau, the town has a total area of 43.2 square miles (111.8 km^{2}), of which 40.3 square miles (104.4 km^{2}) are land and 2.9 square miles (7.4 km^{2}) are water, comprising 6.60% of the town. Enfield is drained by the Mascoma River, a west-flowing tributary of the Connecticut River. Mascoma Lake, in the west, represents Enfield's lowest elevation at 751 feet (229 m) above sea level. The highest elevation is over 2,100 ft (640 m) at the summit of Prospect Hill, overlooking Halfmile Pond. Crystal Lake is in the east. The town lies fully within the Connecticut River watershed.

Enfield is served by Interstate 89, U.S. Route 4, New Hampshire Route 4A and New Hampshire Route 10.

== Demographics ==
Historical population
Census	Pop.	Note	%±
1790	724		—
1800	1,121		54.8%
1810	1,291		15.2%
1820	1,370		6.1%
1830	1,492		8.9%
1840	1,514		1.5%
1850	1,742		15.1%
1860	1,876		7.7%
1870	1,662		−11.4%
1880	1,680		1.1%
1890	1,439		−14.3%
1900	1,845		28.2%
1910	1,448		−21.5%
1920	1,577		8.9%
1930	1,325		−16.0%
1940	1,693		27.8%
1950	1,612		−4.8%
1960	1,867		15.8%
1970	2,345		25.6%
1980	3,175		35.4%
1990	3,979		25.3%
2000	4,618		16.1%
2010	4,582		−0.8%
2020	4,465		−2.6%
U.S. Decennial Census

As of the census of 2010, there were 4,582 people, 2,044 households, and 1,305 families residing in the town. The population density was 113.7 persons per square mile (43.9/km^{2}). There were 2,508 housing units at an average density of 24.0/km^{2} (62.2/sq mi). The racial makeup of the town was 96.8% white, 0.4% African American, 0.3% Native American or Alaska Native, 0.9% Asian, 0.0% Pacific Islander, 0.2% some other race, and 1.4% from two or more races. 1.2% of the population were Hispanic or Latino of any race.

There were 2,044 households, out of which 24.1% had children under the age of 18 living with them, 50.1% were headed by married couples living together, 8.9% had a female householder with no husband present, and 36.2% were non-families. 27.7% of all households were made up of individuals, and 7.0% were someone living alone who was 65 years of age or older. The average household size was 2.24, and the average family size was 2.70.

In the town, the population was spread out, with 19.4% under the age of 18, 6.1% from 18 to 24, 26.8% from 25 to 44, 33.8% from 45 to 64, and 13.9% who were 65 years of age or older. The median age was 43.6 years. For every 100 females, there were 94.6 males. For every 100 females age 18 and over, there were 93.1 males.

For the period 2009–2013, the estimated median annual income for a household in the town was $80,038, and the median income for a family was $89,362. Male full-time workers had a median income of $53,061 versus $43,456 for females. The per capita income for the town was $45,653. 3.1% of the population and 1.2% of families were below the poverty line. 2.3% of people under the age of 18 and 2.2% of people 65 or older were living in poverty.

== Sites of interest ==
- Enfield Shaker Museum
- Shaker Historic Trail, Enfield
- Lockhaven Schoolhouse Museum

== Notable people ==
- Robert O. Blood (1887–1975), physician, 65th governor of New Hampshire
- Jacob Cochran (1782–1836), preacher
- Wolfgang Köhler (1887–1967), German psychologist, phenomenologist
- Frederick Ferdinand Moore (1881–1947), novelist, publisher, soldier and war correspondent
- William Goodhue Perley (1820–1890), businessman and member of the House of Commons of Canada
- Stan Williams (1936–2021), Major League Baseball pitcher
