= PRHS =

PRHS may refer to one of the following high schools:

- Palmetto Ridge High School in Orangetree, Florida, USA
- Park Ridge High School in Park Ridge, New Jersey, USA
- Parrsboro Regional High School in Parrsboro, Nova Scotia, Canada
- Paso Robles High School in Paso Robles, California, USA
- Paul Robeson High School (disambiguation), multiple schools
- Peachtree Ridge High School in Suwanee, Georgia, USA
- Pearl River High School (disambiguation), multiple schools
- Pentucket Regional High School in West Newbury, Massachusetts, USA
- Pinelands Regional High School in Tuckerton, New Jersey, USA
- Pine-Richland High School in Gibsonia, Pennsylvania, USA
- Plymouth Regional High School in Plymouth, New Hampshire, USA
- Porter Ridge High School in Union County, North Carolina, USA
- Prairie Ridge High School in Crystal Lake, Illinois, USA
