= New Hampshire Route 175 =

State highway in Grafton County, New Hampshire, US

New Hampshire Route 175
- Map of Grafton County in northwestern New Hampshire with NH 175 highlighted in red

Route information
- Maintained by NHDOT
- Length: 25.261 mi (40.654 km)

Major junctions
- South end: US 3 / NH 25 in Holderness
- North end: US 3 in Woodstock

Location
- Country: United States
- State: New Hampshire
- Counties: Grafton

Highway system
- New Hampshire Highway System; Interstate; US; State; Turnpikes
← NH 171	→ I-193

New Hampshire Route 175 (NH 175) is a state highway in the U.S. state of New Hampshire. The highway runs north 25.261 miles (40.654 km) from an intersection in Holderness with U.S. Route 3 and New Hampshire Route 25 to an intersection with US 3 in Woodstock.

NH 175 is a minor highway that parallels US 3 and Interstate 93 through the valley of the Pemigewasset River. NH 175 has a secondary spur road, NH 175A, which connects it to downtown Plymouth.

== Route description ==
NH 175 begins at an intersection with US 3 and NH 25 (Daniel Webster Highway) at Little Squam Lake in the town of Holderness. The state highway heads north and then west through a hilly area where it briefly passes through the town of Ashland before returning to Holderness. NH 175 enters the valley of the Pemigewasset River and passes by the historic Trinity Church and near the Holderness School and the Chapel of the Holy Cross. North of the school and churches, the highway meets the eastern end of its spur into Plymouth and Plymouth State University, NH 175A. NH 175 continues north parallel to the river and I-93 and US 3, which follow the opposite, right bank of the river, into the town of Campton. The highway crosses the Beebe River and parallels the Mad River to its bridge over the river immediately to the south of the highway's junction with NH 49. NH 175 passes through the town of Thornton and its name becomes Eastside Road on entering the town of Woodstock. The highway passes under I-93, has two crossings of the Pemigewasset River, and intersects Tripoli Road, which has a diamond interchange with I-93 immediately to the east. NH 175 has an oblique grade crossing of the Hobo Railroad before crossing the river a third time on a truss bridge and reaching its northern terminus at US 3 (Daniel Webster Highway) just south of the community of North Woodstock.

== Major intersections ==
The entire route is in Grafton County.

Location	mi	km	Destinations	Notes
Holderness	0.000	0.000	US 3 / NH 25 (Daniel Webster Highway) – Ashland, Meredith	Southern terminus
Holderness	4.713	7.585	NH 175A to I-93 – Plymouth	Exit 25 on I-93
Campton	12.765	20.543	NH 49 – Waterville Valley	
Woodstock	22.689	36.514	Tripoli Road to I-93	Exit 31 on I-93
Woodstock	25.261	40.654	US 3 (Daniel Webster Highway) – Littleton, Plymouth	Northern terminus
1.000 mi = 1.609 km; 1.000 km = 0.621 mi

== Suffixed route ==
New Hampshire Route 175A
- Location: Plymouth–Holderness
- Length: 0.806 mi (1,297 m)

New Hampshire Route 175A (NH 175A) is a 0.806-mile-long (1.297 km) spur route of NH 175 in the towns of Plymouth and Holderness. The highway begins as the east leg of a roundabout in downtown Plymouth, which is dominated by the campus of Plymouth State University. The north and south legs of the roundabout consist of Main Street, which carries US 3 and NH 25; the west leg is town-maintained High Street. NH 175A has a grade crossing of a railroad and crosses over the Pemigewasset River into Holderness. The highway passes through the athletic complex of the university before reaching its four-ramp partial cloverleaf interchange with I-93. East of I-93, NH 175A has its eastern terminus at NH 175.
