= New Hampshire Route 49 =

State highway in Grafton County, New Hampshire, US

New Hampshire Route 49
- Map of Grafton County in northwestern New Hampshire with NH 49 highlighted in red

Route information
- Maintained by NHDOT
- Length: 11.297 mi (18.181 km)

Major junctions
- West end: US 3 in Campton
- I-93 in Campton
- East end: Valley Road in Waterville Valley

Location
- Country: United States
- State: New Hampshire
- Counties: Grafton

Highway system
- New Hampshire Highway System; Interstate; US; State; Turnpikes
← NH 47	→ NH 63

New Hampshire Route 49 (abbreviated NH 49) is a 11.297-mile-long (18.181 km) east–west state highway in Grafton County, within the White Mountains in central New Hampshire. It runs from Campton to Waterville Valley, and serves mainly to allow traffic to access the Waterville Valley Resort ski area.

== Route description ==
The western terminus of NH 49 is in Campton at U.S. Route 3. Heading east over the Pemigewasset River, there is an interchange with I-93 (exit 28) shortly after the bridge. Turning northeast to follow the Mad River, NH 49 passes through the Lower and Upper Villages of Campton, intersecting with NH 175 before entering the town of Thornton. Passing the community of Goose Hollow, NH 49 enters the White Mountain National Forest as it crosses from the west to the east bank of the Mad River, and enters the town of Waterville Valley. Upon entering the Waterville Valley Resort, the state route ends, though signage is unclear exactly where. NH 49 is one of the few New Hampshire State Routes which does not end at another numbered route. The Waterville Valley portion of Rt. 49 is named for Army SPC Marc Decoteau, killed in Afghanistan on January 29, 2010.

NH 49 is the only road into or out of Waterville Valley during the winter. In the summer months residents can also take Tripoli Road to the northwest.

== Junction list ==
The entire route is in Grafton County.

Location	mi	km	Destinations	Notes
Campton	0.000	0.000	US 3 (Daniel Webster Highway) – Plymouth, Woodstock	Western terminus
Campton	0.947– 1.052	1.524– 1.693	I-93 (Styles Bridges Highway) – Concord, Littleton	Exit 28 on I-93
Campton	2.115	3.404	NH 175 – Thornton, Holderness	
Waterville Valley	11.297	18.181	Valley Road / Tripoli Road	Eastern terminus
1.000 mi = 1.609 km; 1.000 km = 0.621 mi

== Road names ==
NH 49 uses the following road names:

Campton

- Campton Village Road
- Waterville Road

Waterville Valley

- Waterville Road
- Valley Road
- SPC Marc P. Decoteau Memorial Highway

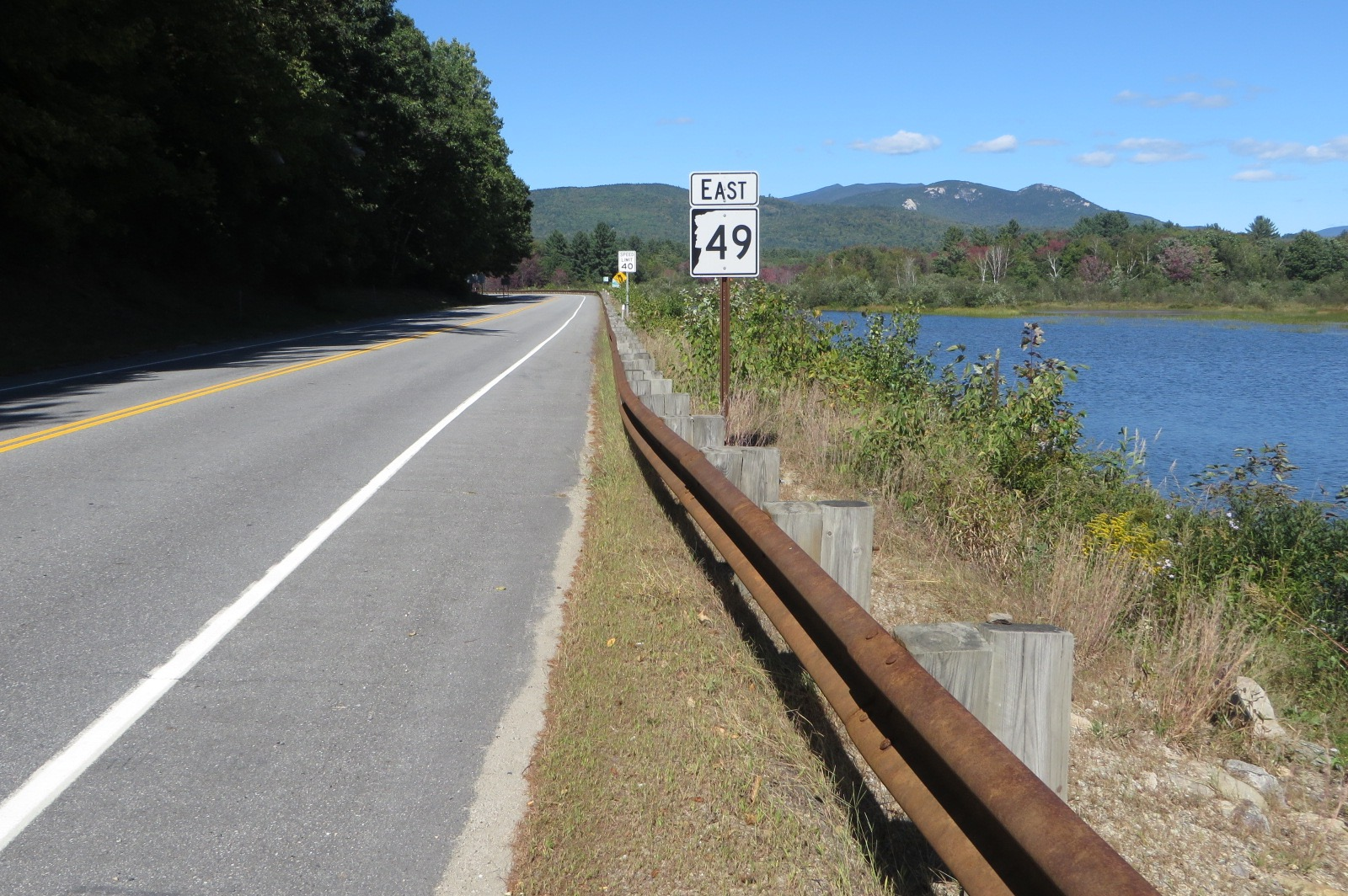
NH 49 at Campton Pond
