= NH 49 =

NH 49 may refer to:

- National Highway 49 (India)
- New Hampshire Route 49, United States
