= Robert Burns (New Hampshire politician) =

American politician (1792–1866)

Member of the U.S. House of Representatives from New Hampshire's At-Large district
- In office March 4, 1833 – March 3, 1837
- Preceded by: Thomas Chandler
- Succeeded by: Samuel Cushman

Member of the New Hampshire Senate
- In office 1831

Personal details
- Born: December 12, 1792 Hudson, Hillsborough County, New Hampshire, US
- Died: June 26, 1866 (aged 73) Plymouth; Grafton County; New Hampshire, US
- Resting place: Trinity Churchyard Cemetery, Trinity Church, Holderness; Grafton County; New Hampshire, US
- Party: Jacksonian
- Spouse(s): Mary Merril Burns; Almira Cox Burns
- Children: Susan Burns Woodbury; William Burns; Mary B. Burns Weeks; Annie S. Burns Porter; Robert Burns
- Parent(s): George Burns; Anna Adams Burns
- Education: Dartmouth Medical School
- Profession: Physician; Politician

Robert Burns (December 12, 1792 – June 26, 1866) was an American and a U.S. Representative from New Hampshire.

== Early life ==
Born in Hudson, New Hampshire, Burns moved with his parents in childhood to Rumney in Grafton County. He studied medicine with Dr. Ezra Bartlett in Warren, New Hampshire, taught school, then attended Dartmouth Medical School in 1815.

== Career ==
Burns returned to Warren to help with people hit with spotted fever and commenced the practice of medicine. He moved 20 miles south to Hebron in 1818 and continued the practice of his profession until 1835. He became a fellow of the New Hampshire Medical Society in 1824 and served as member of the New Hampshire Senate in 1831.

Elected as a Jacksonian to the Twenty-third and Twenty-fourth Congresses, Burns served as United States Representative for the state of New Hampshire from (March 4, 1833 – March 3, 1837). He continued the practice of medicine in Plymouth, New Hampshire, until his death.

== Death ==
Burns died in Plymouth on June 26, 1866 (age 73 years, 196 days). She was interred at the churchyard of Trinity Church, Holderness, New Hampshire.

== Family life ==
Son of George and Anna Adams Burns, he married Mary Merrill on November 6, 1816, and they had three children, Susan, William, and Mary B. After Mary's death on September 15, 1849, he married Almira Cox and they had two children, Annie S. and Robert.

U.S. House of Representatives
| Preceded by Thomas Chandler | Member of the U.S. House of Representatives from New Hampshire; 1833-1837 | Succeeded by Samuel Cushman |
