= Blair Bridge (New Hampshire) =

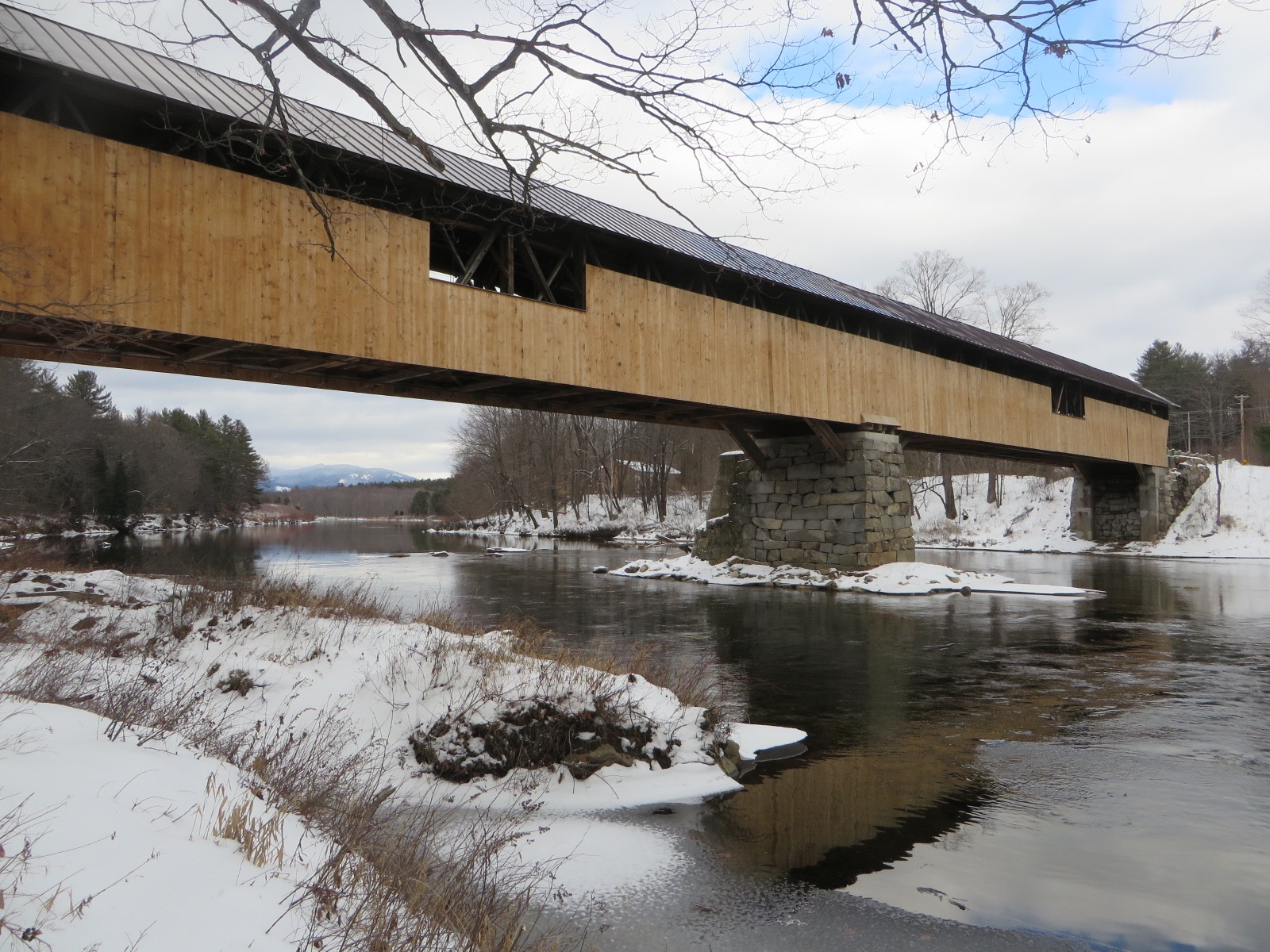
- Coordinates: 43°48′36″N 71°39′55″W
- Carries: Blair Road
- Crosses: Pemigewasset River
- Locale: Campton, New Hampshire, USA

Characteristics
- Design: Long truss with arches

NH State Register of Historic Places
- Designated: July 27, 2009

The Blair Bridge is a wooden covered bridge built in 1870 that crosses the Pemigewasset River near Campton, New Hampshire, United States. It connects New Hampshire Route 175 to the east and U.S. Route 3 and Interstate 93 to the west.

The previous bridge at this location was built in 1829. On Wednesday, July 28, 1869, Campton's Blair Bridge was destroyed by arson. Lemuel Palmer (1834–1911) was charged with the crime. Palmer drove a wagon loaded with hay onto the bridge, unhitched the horse, then lit the hay on fire. At the trial, Palmer reportedly stated that God told him to do it. Palmer was found not guilty as no witnesses saw him commit the crime.

The current Long truss was constructed in 1870 by Hiram Wesley Merrill for $3,350. The bridge was damaged during Tropical Storm Irene on August 28, 2011.

The Blair Bridge was restored in 2014 by Arnold M. Graton Associates, Inc. of Holderness for $2,209,704.70. Tim Dansereau served as project manager, and engineer Sean T. James, P.E., of Hoyle, Tanner & Associates, Inc. of Manchester, served as lead engineer. The Blair Bridge reopened with a new rating of six tons and was awarded a Preservation Achievement Award by the New Hampshire Preservation Alliance in 2015.

As with many covered bridges, it is only wide enough for one lane of traffic; opposing traffic must wait until the bridge has cleared.

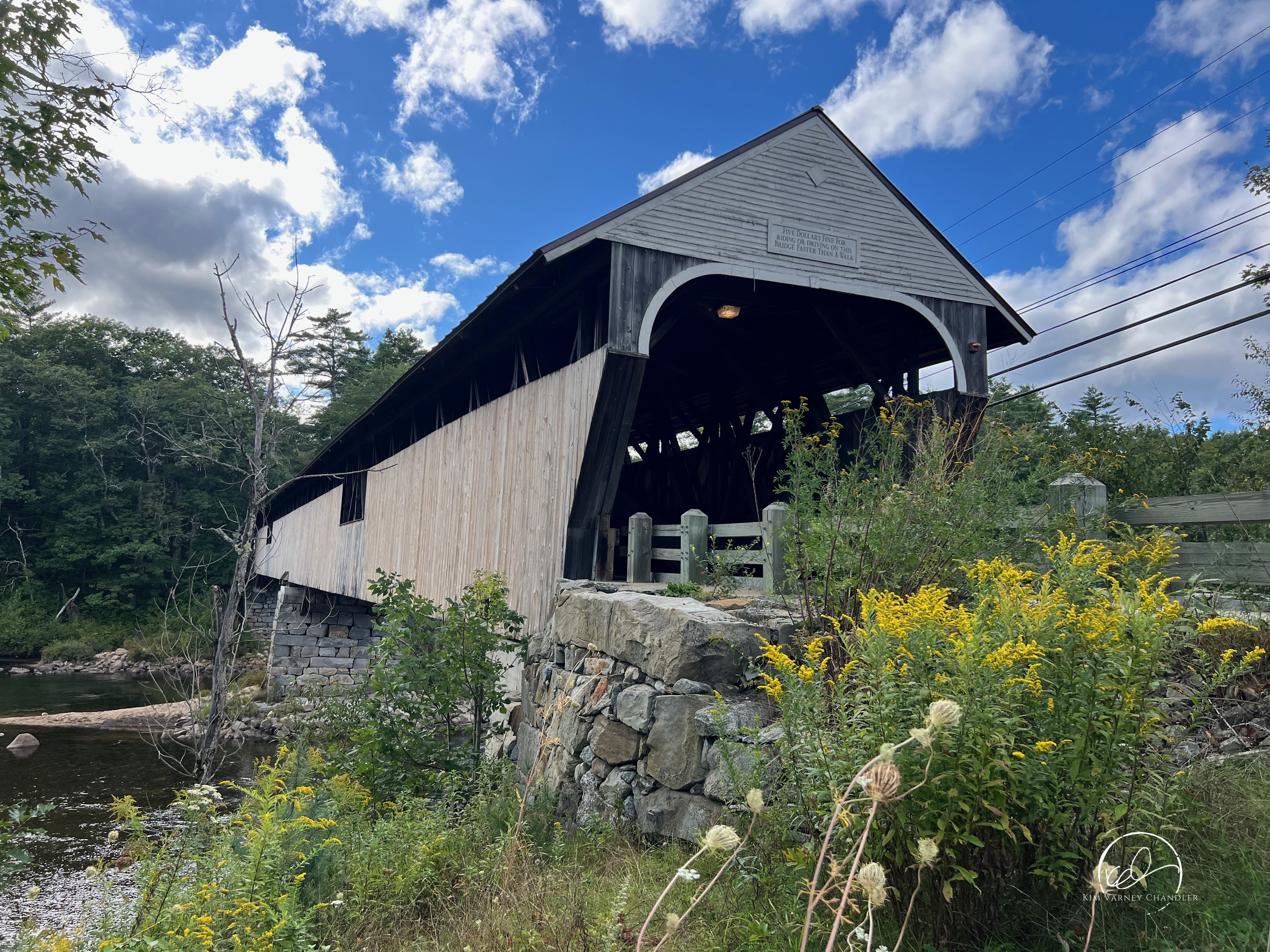
Blair Bridge 2024

== See also ==
- List of New Hampshire covered bridges
- New Hampshire Historical Marker No. 196: Blair Bridge
