= Plymouth Regional High School =

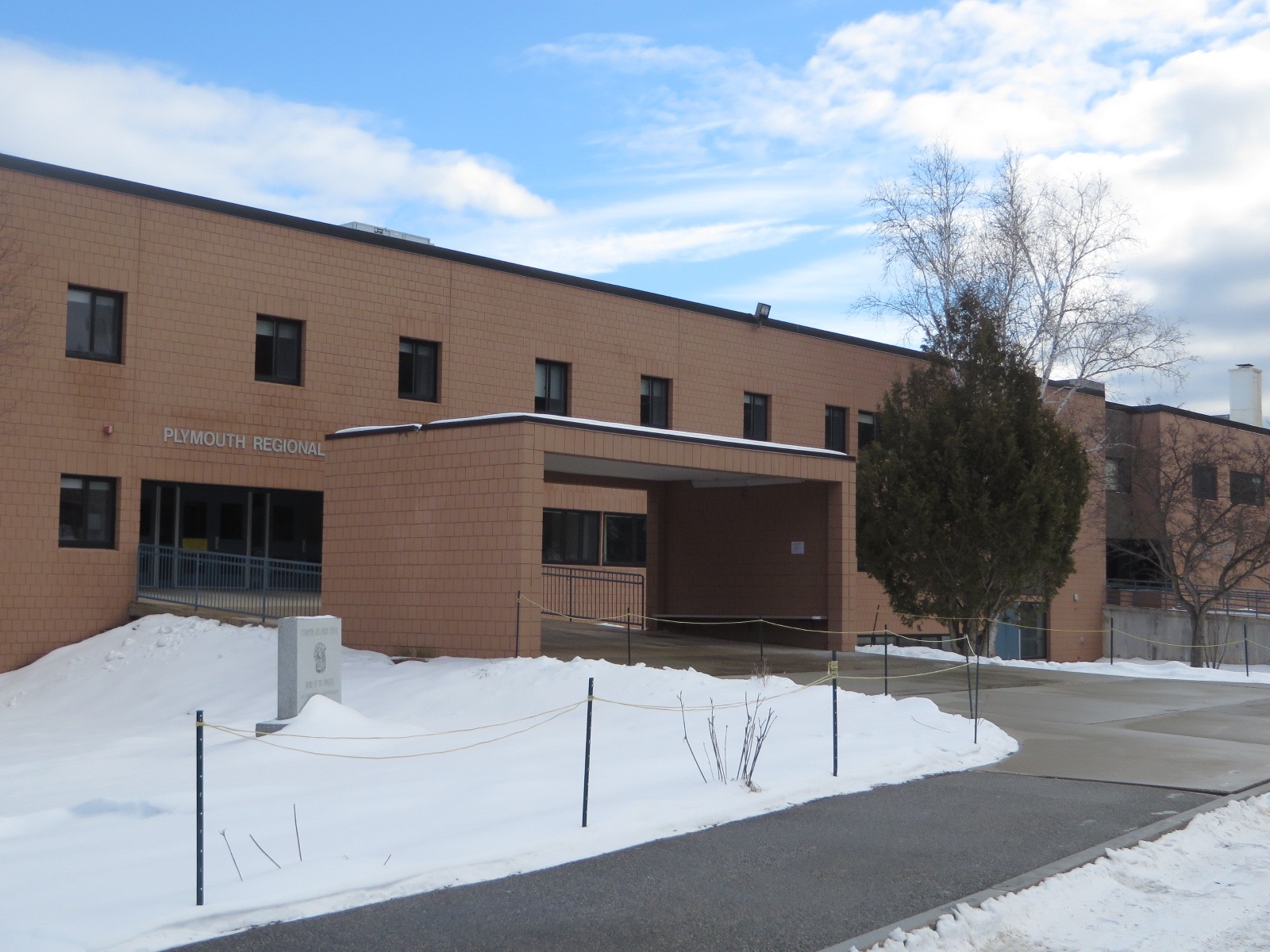

Location
- 86 Old Ward Bridge Road; Plymouth, New Hampshire 03264; United States; 43°45′47″N 71°42′04″W

Information
- School type: Public High School
- Motto: "Pride and Tradition"
- Founded: 1970
- School district: Pemi-Baker Regional School District
- Superintendent: Kyla Welch
- CEEB code: 300510
- Principal: Janet Eccleston
- Grades: 9–12
- Enrollment: 660 (2024-2025)
- Language: English
- Colors: Navy Blue and White
- Athletics conference: NHIAA; Division II
- Mascot: Bobcats
- Rivals: Kennett High School, Souhegan High School, Laconia High School
- Accreditation: NEASC
- Newspaper: PRHS Literary Magazine
- Communities served: Ashland, Campton, Ellsworth, Holderness, Rumney, Thornton, Warren, Waterville Valley and Wentworth, NH.
- Website: Official Site
- Last updated: April 22nd, 2025

Plymouth Regional High School (PRHS) is a public high school in Plymouth, New Hampshire, United States. Surrounding towns that attend PRHS are Plymouth, Ashland, Holderness, Campton, Rumney, Wentworth, Warren, Ellsworth, Waterville Valley and Thornton. Janet Eccleston is the current principal. The facility, opened in 1970, is located on Old Ward Bridge Road in Plymouth. It also housed Plymouth Elementary School until 1990. Plymouth Regional was known as Plymouth Area High School until 1991. The school colors are navy blue and white.

== School district ==
The school is a part of the Pemi-Baker Regional School District, which houses Plymouth Regional High School. Both schools are governed by a 13-member school board, elected at large by the voters in the member communities and providing proportional representation for those communities in the financing and governing of the high school. The Pemi-Baker Regional School district belongs to SAU (School Administrative Unit) 48, which also oversees the elementary schools in Plymouth, Holderness, Rumney, Campton, Waterville Valley, Thornton, and Wentworth. Warren and Ashland are not part of the same SAU.

== Enrollment ==
According to the 24-25 school profile, the current enrollment is as follows:

Class of 2025 - 180

Class of 2026 - 159

Class of 2027 - 151

Class of 2028 - 170

== Student activities ==
Student activities at PRHS include many clubs, a national honor society chapter, a competitive theatre program, an award-winning chapter of YMCA's Youth and Government program, and a student senate.

A full list of student activities can be found here.

== Athletics ==
=== Football ===
Plymouth's football team (Division II) is currently coached by Christopher Sanborn, who has been the head coach since 2014. The previous coach, Chuck Lenahan, won 20 state championships during his 43-year tenure as head football coach at Plymouth. On September 13, 2008, Lenahan recorded his 300th win. The Bobcats had a winning streak of 57 games until the streak was snapped by Kennett High of Conway on September 18, 2010. Plymouth also owned a 46-game winning streak from 2000–2004. Lenahan is regarded as one of the greatest football coaches of all-time in New England, and he also is the winningest high school football coach of all-time in the New England region. During Lenahan's final season as head coach in 2013, he led the Bobcats to an 11–1 record and a second straight state championship. Lenahan officially retired with an overall record of 356–70–1. Lenahan is also one of only eight New England area coaches to reach 300 wins in their career. The coaches and their number of wins are listed below:

- Chuck Lenahan – 356 wins – Plymouth (NH) (1971–2013)
- Rod Wotten – 342 wins – Marshwood (ME), and St. Thomas Aquinas (NH) (1963–2010)
- Ed McCarthy – 332 wins – West Haven (CT) and St. Joseph (CT) (1971–2014)
- Ken LaChapelle – 329 wins – Northbridge (MA) (Active) (1976–Present)
- Armond Colombo – 322 wins – Archbishop Williams (MA) and Brockton (MA) (1960–2003)
- Bill Mignault – 321 wins – Ledyard (CT) and Waterford (CT) (1959–1963, 1966–2007)
- Lou Marinelli – 319 wins – New Canaan (CT) (1976–Present)
- Bill Broderick – 304 wins – Cambridge Rindge & Latin (MA), Haverhill (MA) and Salem (MA) (1908–1942, 1949)

Football Accomplishments

- State Champions – 1951, 1967, 1969, 1972, 1975, 1977, 1980, 1994, 1997, 1998, 2000, 2001, 2002, 2003, 2005, 2006, 2007, 2008, 2009, 2012, 2013, 2016, 2017, 2018
- Undefeated Seasons – 1972, 1977, 1980, 1998, 2000, 2001, 2002, 2003, 2005, 2006, 2007, 2008, 2009, 2012, 2017, 2018

=== Wrestling ===
Plymouth's wrestling team is currently coached by Randy Cleary and Todd Austin and has won nine state championships as of 2014-2015.

== Notable alumni ==
- Eliza Coupe, actress
