= Joshua Whitehouse =

American politician

Member of the New Hampshire House of Representatives from the Strafford 2nd district
- In office December 3, 2014 – December 7, 2016 Serving with Joseph Pitre
- Preceded by: Rachel Burke
- Succeeded by: James Horgan

Personal details
- Born: Joshua Daniel Whitehouse; 1994 or 1995 (age 31–32)
- Education: Saint Anselm College

Joshua Daniel Whitehouse (born 1994 or 1995) is an American politician who served as a member of the New Hampshire House of Representatives for the town of Farmington from 2014 to 2016.

== Early life and education ==
Whitehouse completed coursework towards a Bachelor of Arts degree in political science from Saint Anselm College.

== New Hampshire political career ==
Whitehouse has been a member of the New Hampshire Republican State Committee since 2014, and served on the Executive Board of the New Hampshire Young Republicans from 2013 to 2016.

From March 2015 to February 2016, Whitehouse worked as the coalitions coordinator for the Donald Trump 2016 presidential campaign. Because of his work on the campaign, Whitehouse was largely absent from votes in the New Hampshire House of Representatives, and did not run for re-election in 2016.

In 2023, Whitehouse served as the New Hampshire state director for the Vivek Ramaswamy 2024 presidential campaign.

== Trump administration ==
Whitehouse served as an assistant to the Under Secretary of Agriculture for Research, Education, and Economics in the Donald Trump administration from January 20, 2017, to September 16, 2017. After leaving the Department of Agriculture, Whitehouse was communications director for Robert Burns' 2018 campaign for New Hampshire's 2nd congressional district. Burns placed fourth in the Republican primary.

In March 2020, Whitehouse was appointed as the Trump administration's liaison to the Department of Homeland Security. In September 2020, Whitehouse was appointed as the administration's liaison to the Department of Defense.

In January 2021, acting defense secretary Christopher C. Miller appointed him to the Commission on the Naming of Items of the Department of Defense that Commemorate the Confederate States of America or Any Person Who Served Voluntarily with the Confederate States of America, which was established by the 2021 NDAA. On February 12, 2021, he and other Miller appointees to the commission were removed by newly-confirmed defense secretary Lloyd Austin.
