= Trinity Church (Holderness, New Hampshire) =

Historic church in New Hampshire, United States

- U.S. National Register of Historic Places
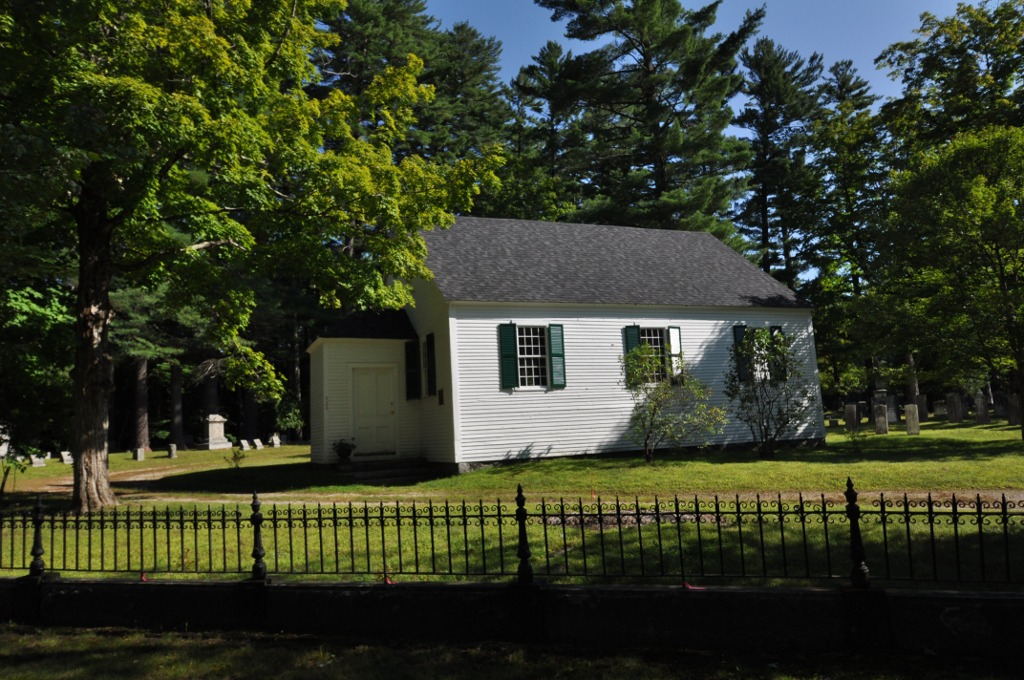

- Location within New Hampshire Location within the United States
- Location: NH 175, Holderness, New Hampshire
- Coordinates: 43°45′24″N 71°40′11″W
- Area: 0.1 acres (0.040 ha)
- Built: 1797
- NRHP reference No.: 84003203
- Added to NRHP: September 7, 1984

Trinity Church is a historic Episcopal church, located in a small cemetery on New Hampshire Route 175 in Holderness, New Hampshire. Built in 1797, it is one of only two surviving 18th-century buildings in the state that was built as a church (the other is the Union Church in Claremont). It is also the only major surviving structure associated with the life of Samuel Livermore, a prominent New Hampshire statesman and jurist. The church was listed on the National Register of Historic Places in 1984. It is maintained by the cemetery's association, and is occasionally used for services.

== Description and history ==
Trinity Church is located in a rural setting in northwestern Holderness, on the grounds of Trinity Cemetery on the north side of New Hampshire Route 175. It is a modest single-story wood-frame structure, with a gabled roof and clapboarded exterior. A hip-roofed entry vestibule projects from one end, and a shed-roofed pulpit section projects from the opposite end. Unlike most early New Hampshire buildings used as churches, it follows a traditional Anglican church layout, rather than that of the colonial meeting house that was more typically built with entrance and pulpit on the long sides of the building.

The church was constructed in 1797 with most of its funding from Samuel Livermore, a prominent early settler of Holderness and a New Hampshire statesman who lived nearby, and is buried near the church in the cemetery. It was built on land owned by Livermore, and remained in the family's ownership until 1854, when Arthur Livermore Jr. deeded it along with the adjoining burying ground to the Trinity Church Yard Cemetery Association for one dollar. The association has owned and maintained it ever since. The church's congregation declined in size in the mid-19th century, and it is now only used occasionally for services. The nearby Holderness School opened with a sermon in Trinity Church on September 11, 1879, and it served as the school's chapel until 1884, when a new church was built on its campus. The school still holds annual services here.

== See also ==
- National Register of Historic Places listings in Grafton County, New Hampshire
