= Karl Drerup =

American ceramics artist (1904–2000)

- Born: 1904; Borghorst, Westphalia
- Died: 2000 (aged 95–96)
- Education: Vereinigte Staatsschulen; Accademia di Belle Arti
- Known for: Enamelist

Karl Joseph Maria Drerup (1904–2000) was an American enamelist. Drerup trained as a painter, and began enamelling in the early 1940s, fusing glass to metal through a high-temperature firing process. He was considered a leading figure in the development of enamelling in the United States in the twentieth-century.

== Early life and training ==
Born in 1904 in Borghorst, Westphalia, in the northwest region of Germany, Drerup was raised in an affluent Roman Catholic household. In 1918, he and his brother were sent to a Cistercian monastery school. In 1921, Drerup attended the Kunstgewerbeschule in Münster, where he studied painting and drawing. He later received more advanced training in printmaking and the graphic arts from Hans Meid and Karl Michel at the Vereinigte Staatsschulen, Berlin, from 1927 to 1929. It was in Berlin that Drerup first saw the work of the enamel artist Hanns Bastanier.

In 1930, Drerup moved to Florence to continue his studies with the Italian painter Felice Carena at the Accademia di Belle Arti, where he remained until 1933. In 1932, he met Gertrude Lifmann, a linguistics student, who he later married. While in Florence, Drerup began to experiment with clay, learning techniques from artisans working in ceramic shops and studios. In 1934, he and Gertrude married and moved to Madrid.

== Career ==
=== Tenerife ===
Because Gertrude was Jewish and antisemitism was increasing in Europe, the Drerups moved to Puerto de la Cruz, Tenerife, in the Canary Islands. Between 1934 and 1937, Drerup painted while his wife worked as a translator. The paintings and drawings he made in Tenerife frequently depict the day-to-day lives of the islanders, working in the fields by day and fishing at night. Colourful images from this idyllic period in Drerup's life recur throughout his work.

During this period, Drerup established an international exhibition record. His paintings were shown in exhibitions in Europe, including presentations at the Landesmuseum Münster (1931) and with the Vereinigung Westfälischer Künstler und Kunstfreunde in Dortmund (1932). In 1932, his work was also exhibited in New York as part of an exhibition at the Nicholas Roerich Museum.

Although Drerup was primarily known as a painter at this stage of his career, his ceramics were included in a 1934 exhibition at the Westfälischer Kunstverein organized by the Landesmuseum Münster.

=== United States ===
In 1937, with political turmoil increasing throughout Europe, the Drerups moved to the United States, settling in Rockville Centre, a small community on Long Island, east of New York City. They lived and worked there until 1945.

Drerup later recalled that in 1937, while visiting the Whitney Museum of American Art, he saw and was impressed by the enamels of Edward Winter, particularly Winter's large enamel panels. Additionally, a chance encounter with the designer Tommi Parzinger at the Rena Rosenthal Gallery led to a friendship between the two artists, and Parzinger encouraged Drerup to explore enameling. By 1940, Drerup was exhibiting his enamels in the National Ceramic as Exhibition at the Syracuse Museum of Fine Arts (now the Everson Museum of Art), where he won his first honourable mention.

In 1941, Drerup submitted a mural-scale composition titled Enchanted Garden to the National Ceramic Exhibition. Using six-by-six-inch copper panels, he enamelled each of the eighteen plaques with a fantasy-inspired landscape depicting a variety of flora and fauna. This work is now in the collection of the Smithsonian American Art Museum.

In the early 1940s, Drerup taught art at Adelphi College in Long Island. Several solo exhibitions were organised and circulated between 1941 and 1944, and he also participated in a number of juried shows. In 1941, an exhibition comprising more than fifty of Drerup's earliest enamel plaques, plates, bowls, boxes, and other objects was organised by the Arts and Crafts Club of New Orleans and traveled to eight institutions on the West Coast through 1943.

In 1945, at the urging of David Campbell, the President of the League of New Hampshire Craftsmen, and ceramists Edwin and Mary Scheier, the Drerups moved to Thornton, New Hampshire. In 1946, Drerup became a member of the League of New Hampshire Craftsmen. Also in 1946, he was invited to teach an enamel workshop at Plymouth State College near his home, and in 1948 he was appointed to the newly created post of professor of fine arts. He taught there until his retirement in 1968 when the college named its art gallery in his honour and also granted him an honorary doctorate.

Throughout his career, Drerup produced numerous variants on several favourite subjects and themes. Among these were images depicting Saint George, Saint Eustace, and Saint Hubert. Plaque (Pond Life) of c. 1957 (in the collection of the Enamel Arts Foundation, Los Angeles) reveals his fascination with the natural world.

Although Drerup produced both grisaille and cloisonné enamels, he is best known for his painterly approach to enamelling and for his attention to detail. In 1957 the newly formed Museum of Contemporary Crafts in New York awarded one of its first solo exhibitions to Drerup. For the museum's 1959 exhibition "Enamels", he was invited, along with Kenneth F. Bates and Edward Winter, to have a retrospective within the context of the whole show, which presented historical enamels as well as the work of contemporary practitioners.

== Exhibitions ==
Selected exhibitions
Year	Title	Institution	Location	Ref
1931		Landesmuseum Münster		
1932		Vereinigung Westfälischer Künstler und Kunstfreunde	Dortmund	
1932	Deutscher Künstlerbund	Nicholas Roerich Museum	New York	
1934		Westfälischer Kunstverein		
1941	National Ceramic Exhibition	Syracuse Museum of Fine Arts		
1957		Museum of Contemporary Crafts	New York	

== Honours and awards ==
- 1950, elected a master craftsman of the Society of Arts and Crafts, Boston
- 1989, New Hampshire Living Treasure Award
- 1995, became a fellow of the American Craft Council
