= Pemigewasset House =

Coordinates: 43.7568°N 71.6881°W

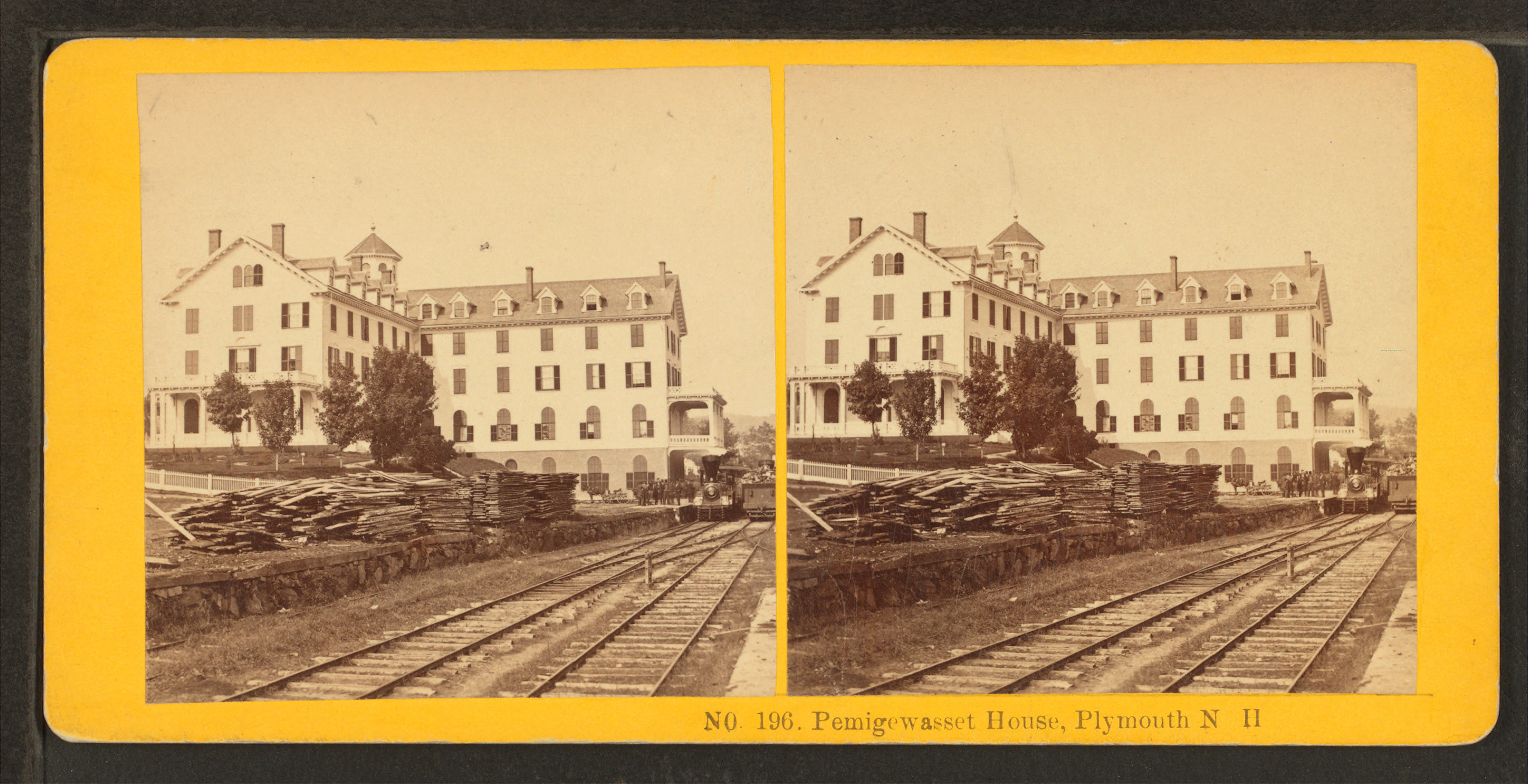
Stereoscopic photograph of Pemigewasset House by the Kilburn Brothers

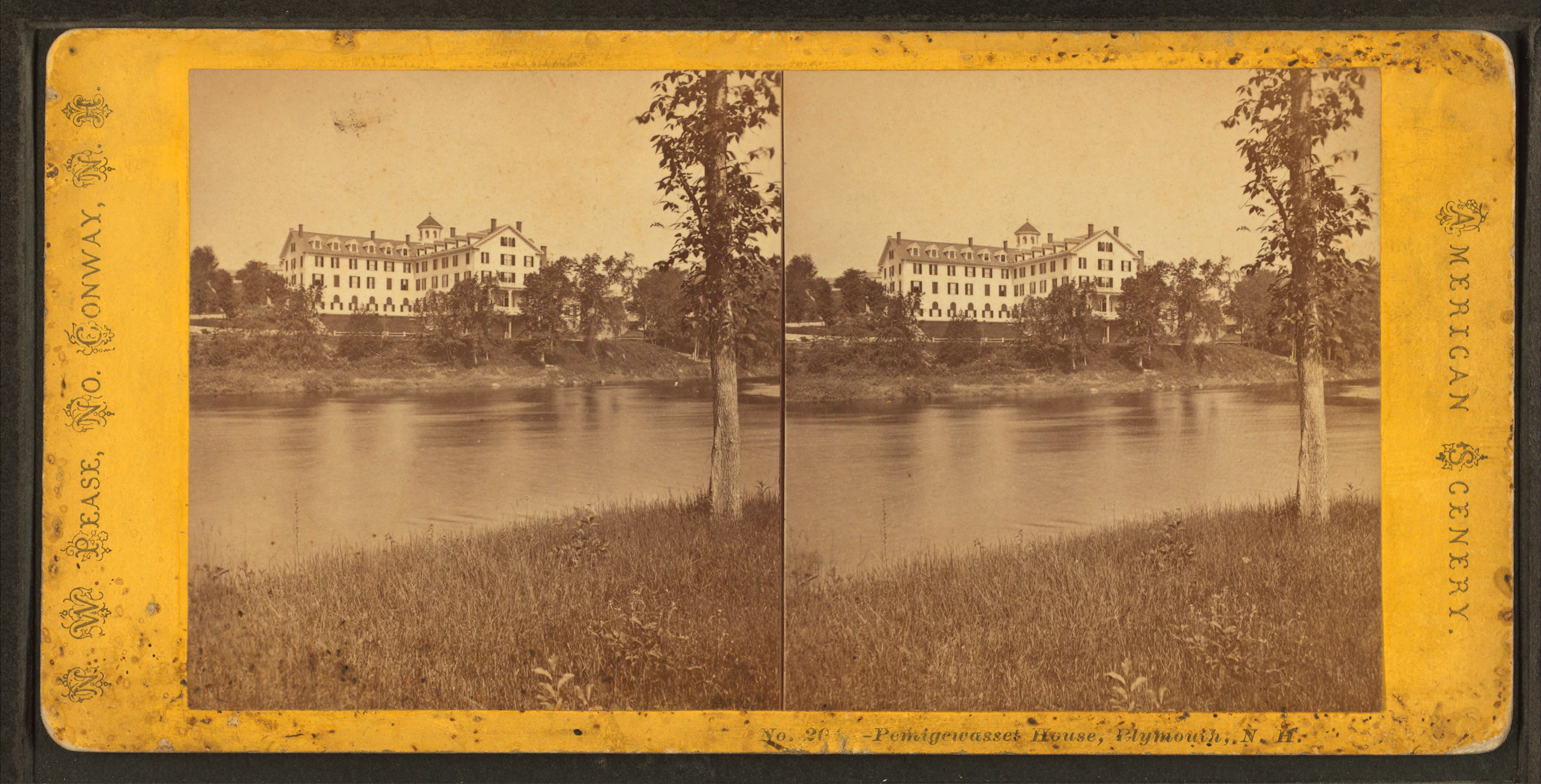
Image by Nathan W. Pease

Pemigewasset House was a grand hotel in Plymouth, New Hampshire. It began as a tavern in 1800. In 1841 Denison Burnam turned it into Pemigewasset House, and it tripled in size by 1859 with a grand dining room and railroad depot among the additions. A fire destroyed it in 1862, and a new four-story hotel was constructed on the site. It was served by the Boston, Concord, & Maine Railroad with its own depot. Guests included President Franklin Pierce, a regular, and Nathaniel Hawthorne who died at the hotel. It, too, was destroyed by fire in 1909.
