= Plymouth (CDP), New Hampshire =

Census-designated place in New Hampshire, United States

Plymouth, New Hampshire
- Census-designated place
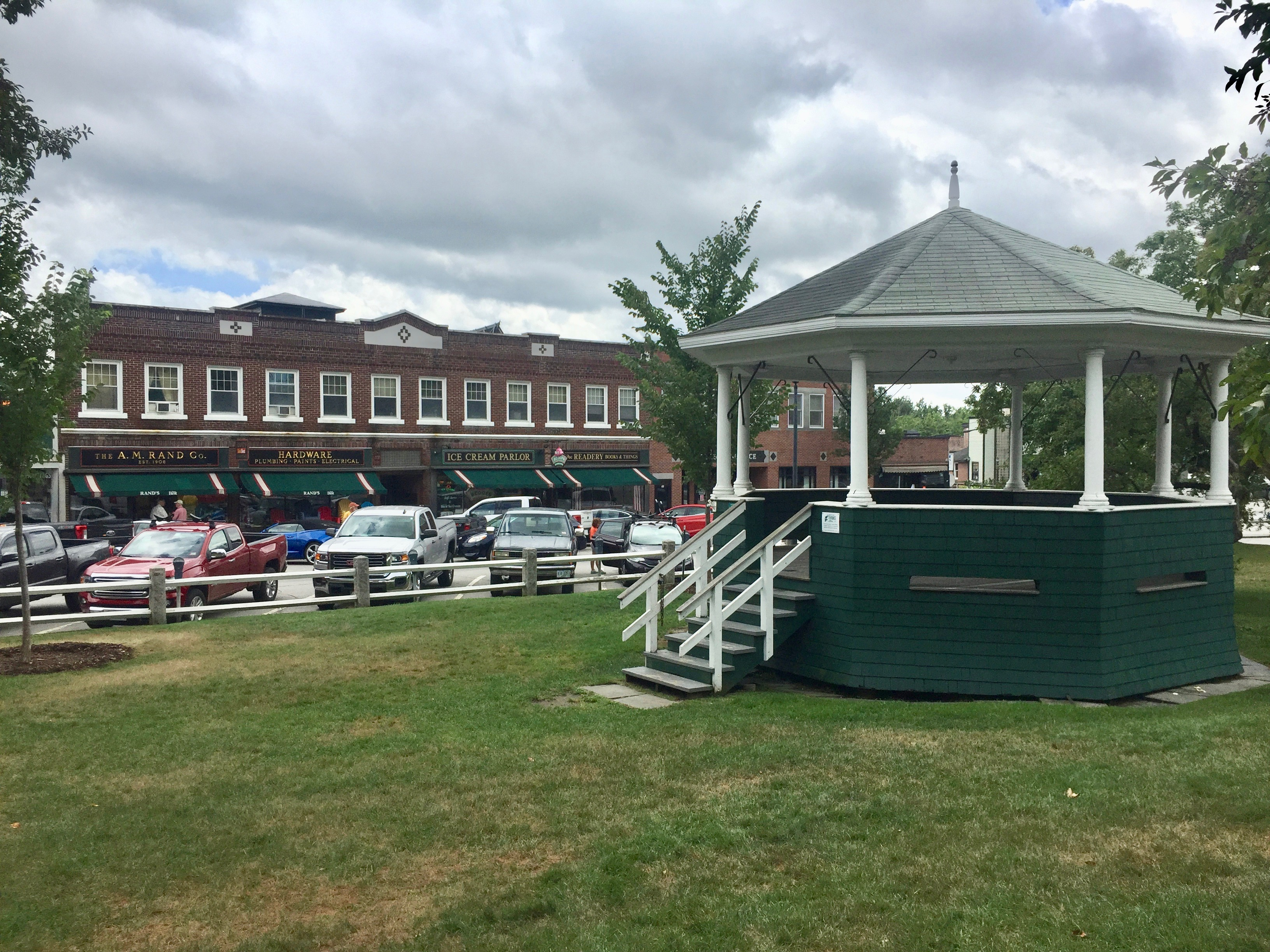
- View of Plymouth from the Town Oval, 2018

- Location within New Hampshire Location within the United States
- Coordinates: 43°45′25″N 71°41′17″W
- Country: United States
- State: New Hampshire
- County: Grafton
- Town: Plymouth

Area
  - Total: 5.95 sq mi (15.41 km^{2})
  - Land: 5.88 sq mi (15.22 km^{2})
  - Water: 0.073 sq mi (0.19 km^{2})
- Elevation: 666 ft (203 m)

Population (2020)
  - Total: 4,730
  - Density: 805.1/sq mi (310.87/km^{2})
- Time zone: UTC-5 (Eastern (EST))
  - Summer (DST): UTC-4 (EDT)
- ZIP code: 03264
- Area code: 603
- FIPS code: 33-62580
- GNIS feature ID: 2378089

Plymouth is a census-designated place (CDP) and the main village in the town of Plymouth, New Hampshire, United States. Its population was 4,730 at the 2020 census, out of 6,682 in the entire town. The CDP includes the campus of Plymouth State University.

== Geography ==
The CDP is in the eastern part of the town of Plymouth, on the west side of the Pemigewasset River. It includes the town center, the campus of Plymouth State University, and residential neighborhoods to the west and south of the town center. The CDP boundary is the Pemigewasset River on the east, Glove Hollow Brook to the south, Texas Hill Road to the south and west, Clay Brook to the west, and Route 25 and the Baker River to the north.

Interstate 93 runs just to the east of Plymouth, across the Pemigewasset River in the town of Holderness, with access from Exit 25 (New Hampshire Route 175A) and Exit 26 (New Hampshire Route 25). I-93 leads north 44 miles (71 km) to Littleton and south 43 miles (69 km) to Concord, the state capital. U.S. Route 3 passes through the center of the community, leading north 7 miles (11 km) to Campton and south 6 miles (10 km) to Ashland. NH 25 (Tenney Mountain Highway) passes just north of the CDP, leading northwest 35 miles (56 km) to Haverhill, New Hampshire.

According to the U.S. Census Bureau, the Plymouth CDP has a total area of 5.9 square miles (15.4 km^{2}), of which 5.9 square miles (15.2 km^{2}) are land and 0.1 square miles (0.2 km^{2}), or 1.25%, are water.

== Demographics ==
Historical population
Census	Pop.	Note	%±
1950	2,107		—
1960	2,244		6.5%
1970	3,109		38.5%
1980	3,628		16.7%
1990	3,967		9.3%
2000	3,528		−11.1%
2010	4,456		26.3%
2020	4,730		6.1%
U.S. Decennial Census

The population totals of the Plymouth CDP are strongly influenced by the presence of Plymouth State University, with students living in dormitories and in off-campus housing in the community. As of the census of 2010, there were 4,456 people, 836 households, and 321 families residing in the CDP. There were 910 housing units, of which 74, or 8.1%, were vacant. The racial makeup of the CDP was 96.4% white, 0.8% African American, 0.2% Native American, 1.1% Asian, 0.0% Pacific Islander, 0.5% some other race, and 1.0% from two or more races. 1.8% of the population were Hispanic or Latino of any race.

Of the 836 households in the CDP, 19.3% had children under the age of 18 living with them, 30.0% were headed by married couples living together, 5.3% had a female householder with no husband present, and 61.6% were non-families. 23.8% of all households were made up of individuals, and 3.2% were someone living alone who was 65 years of age or older. The average household size was 2.61, and the average family size was 2.95. 2,277 people in the CDP lived in group quarters such as dormitories rather than households.

6.6% of residents in the CDP were under the age of 18, 74.1% were from age 18 to 24, 8.3% were from 25 to 44, 8.2% were from 45 to 64, and 2.7% were 65 years of age or older. The median age was 20.8 years. For every 100 females, there were 116.0 males. For every 100 females age 18 and over, there were 116.6 males.

For the period 2011–15, the estimated median annual income for a household was $27,066, and the median income for a family was $98,068. Male full-time workers had a median income of $60,703 versus $45,903 for females. The per capita income for the CDP was $16,510. 37.4% of the population and 0.0% of families were below the poverty line, along with 0.0% of people under the age of 18 and 0.0% of people 65 or older.
