= Pearl River (disambiguation) =

The Pearl River is an extensive river system in southern China.

Pearl River may also refer to:

== Places ==
- Pearl River (Mississippi–Louisiana), US, a river
- Pearl River, Louisiana, US, a town
- Pearl River, Mississippi, US, a community
- Pearl River, New York, US, a hamlet
  - Pearl River station, a commuter railroad station
- Pearl River County, Mississippi, US
  - Pearl River County School District
- Pearl River, an older name for Pearl Harbor in O'ahu, Hawaii
- Pearl River Resort, Mississippi, US

== Businesses and organizations ==
- Pearl River Community College, Mississippi, US
- Pearl River Mart, New York City retail store
- Pearl River Piano Group, a Chinese piano manufacturer

== Other uses ==
- Pearl River (band), a country music band, and the title of their 1994 album
- Pearl Rivers (pen name of Eliza Jane Nicholson, 1843–1896), American journalist and poet

== See also ==
- Pearl River High School (disambiguation)
- Pearl River Delta, a metropolitan region in Southern China
- Pearl River Tower, in Tianhe, Guangzhou, China
