= Beebe River =

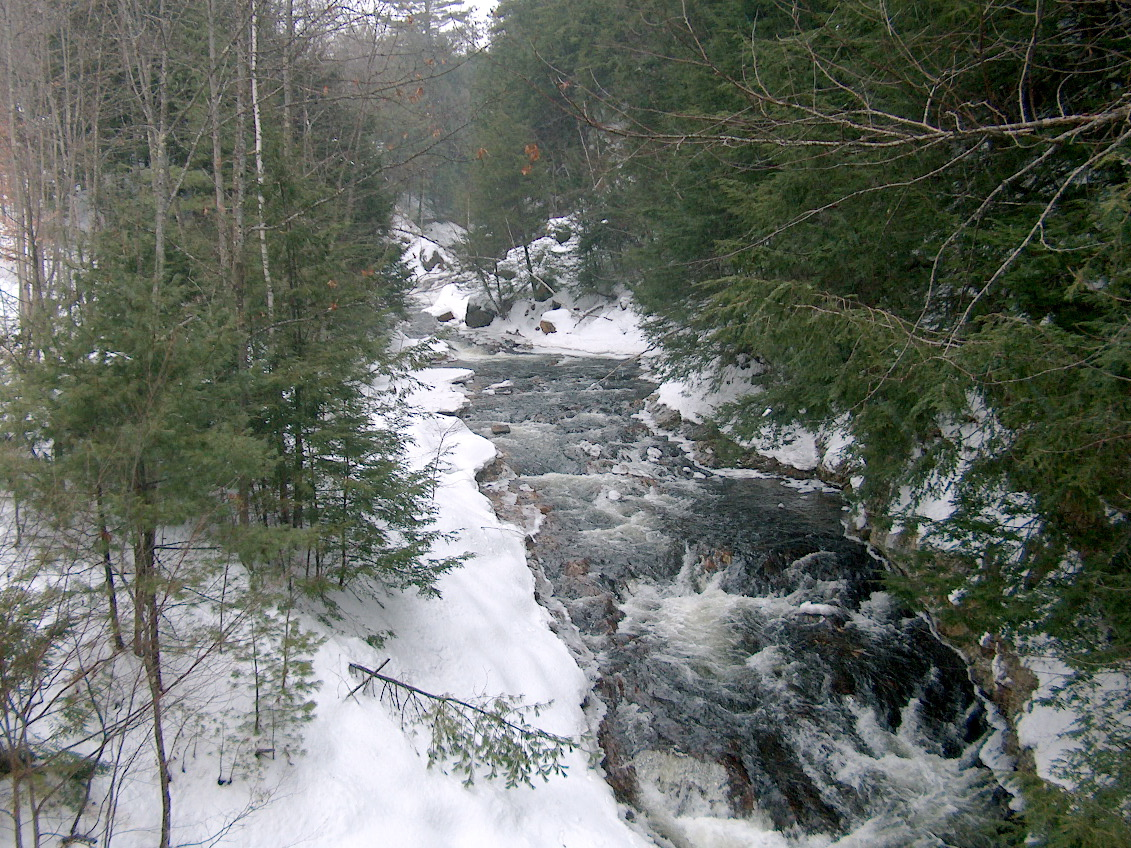
- The Beebe River at Route 175 in Campton

- Location within New Hampshire Location within the United States

Location
- Country: United States
- State: New Hampshire
- Counties: Carroll, Grafton
- Towns: Sandwich, Campton

Physical characteristics
- Source: Black Mountain Pond
  - location: Sandwich, Carroll County
  - coordinates: 43°52′52″N 71°30′26″W
  - elevation: 2,220 ft (680 m)
- Mouth: Pemigewasset River
  - location: Campton, Grafton County
  - coordinates: 43°48′57″N 71°39′40″W
  - elevation: 530 ft (160 m)
- Length: 16.7 mi (26.9 km)

Basin features
- Tributaries
  - left: Spencer Brook, Ryan Brook

The Beebe River is a 16.7-mile-long (26.9 km) river located in the White Mountains of New Hampshire in the United States. It is a tributary of the Pemigewasset River, part of the Merrimack River watershed.

The Beebe River begins at Black Mountain Pond on the southern slopes of Sandwich Mountain, a 3,993-foot (1,217 m) summit in the southern White Mountains, in the town of Sandwich. The river drops off the mountain to the south, then turns west to travel through Sandwich Notch, staying in a wooded valley and entering the town of Campton. The valley broadens as the river approaches the village of Campton Hollow, where the river reaches New Hampshire Route 175 and drops over some small waterfalls. The river passes by the old industrial community of Beebe River and reaches the Pemigewasset River next to Interstate 93.

== See also ==
- List of rivers of New Hampshire
