= West Branch Mad River =

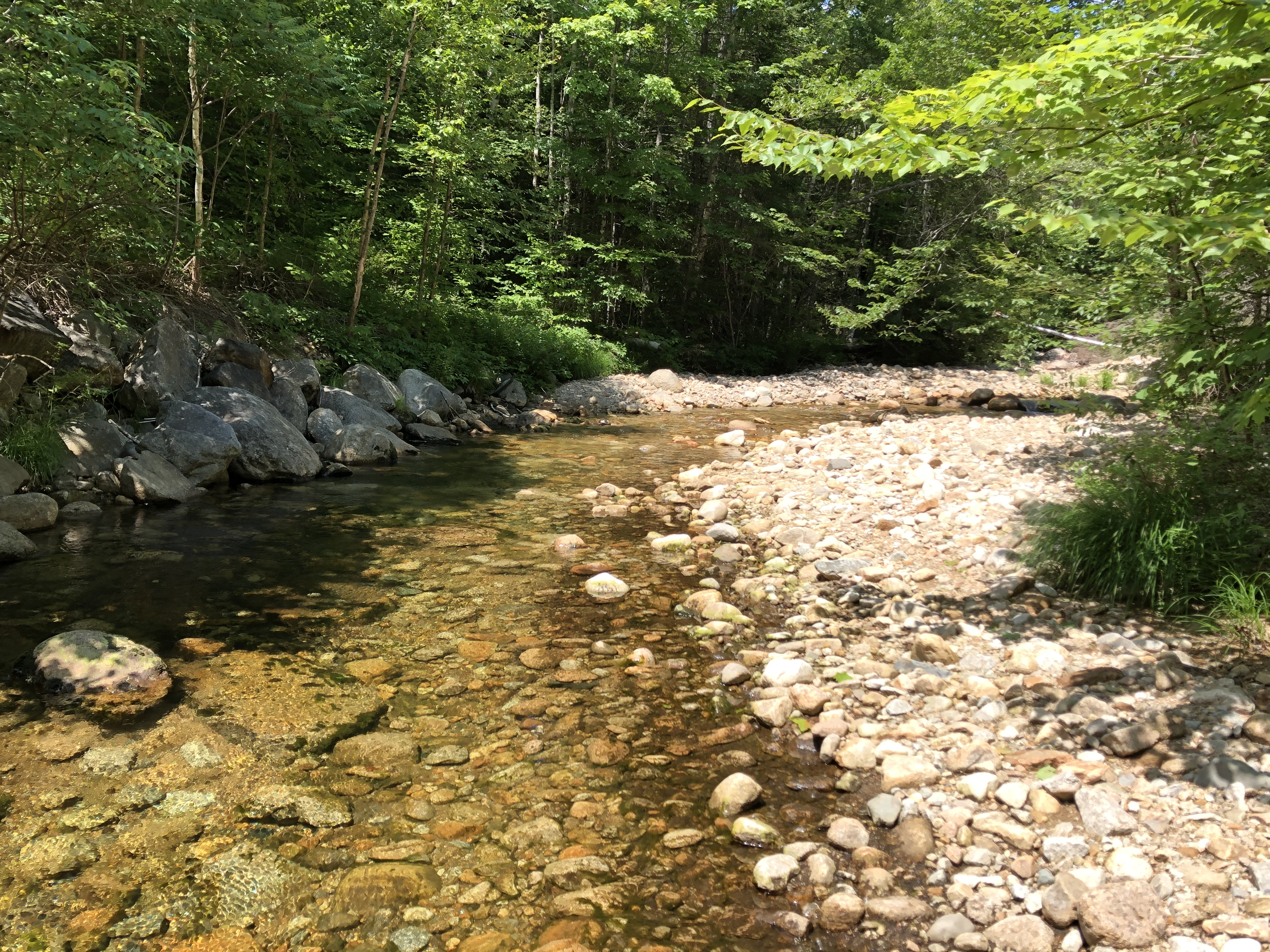
- The West Branch upstream from the West Branch Road bridge in Waterville Valley

- Location within New Hampshire Location within the United States

Location
- Country: United States
- State: New Hampshire
- County: Grafton
- Town: Waterville Valley

Physical characteristics
- Source: Mount Tecumseh
  - location: Waterville Valley
  - coordinates: 43°58′19″N 71°33′28″W
  - elevation: 3,200 ft (980 m)
- Mouth: Mad River
  - location: Waterville Valley
  - coordinates: 43°57′18″N 71°30′44″W
  - elevation: 1,454 ft (443 m)
- Length: 3.2 mi (5.1 km)

Basin features
- Tributaries
  - left: Osceola Brook
  - right: Tecumseh Brook

The West Branch of the Mad River is a 3.2-mile-long (5.1 km) stream located in the White Mountains of New Hampshire in the United States. It is a tributary of the Mad River, part of the Pemigewasset River and ultimately the Merrimack River watershed.

The West Branch rises on the northern slopes of Mount Tecumseh, and drops northeast into Thornton Gap, between Mount Tecumseh and Mount Osceola, two major summits of the White Mountains. The stream turns east, paralleled by Tripoli Road, until it encounters Osceola Brook joining from the north, then turns south into the intervale in which the village of Waterville Valley is situated. The West Branch joins the Mad River close to the center of the Waterville Valley resort.

== See also ==
- List of rivers of New Hampshire
