= Plymouth, New Hampshire =

- Town
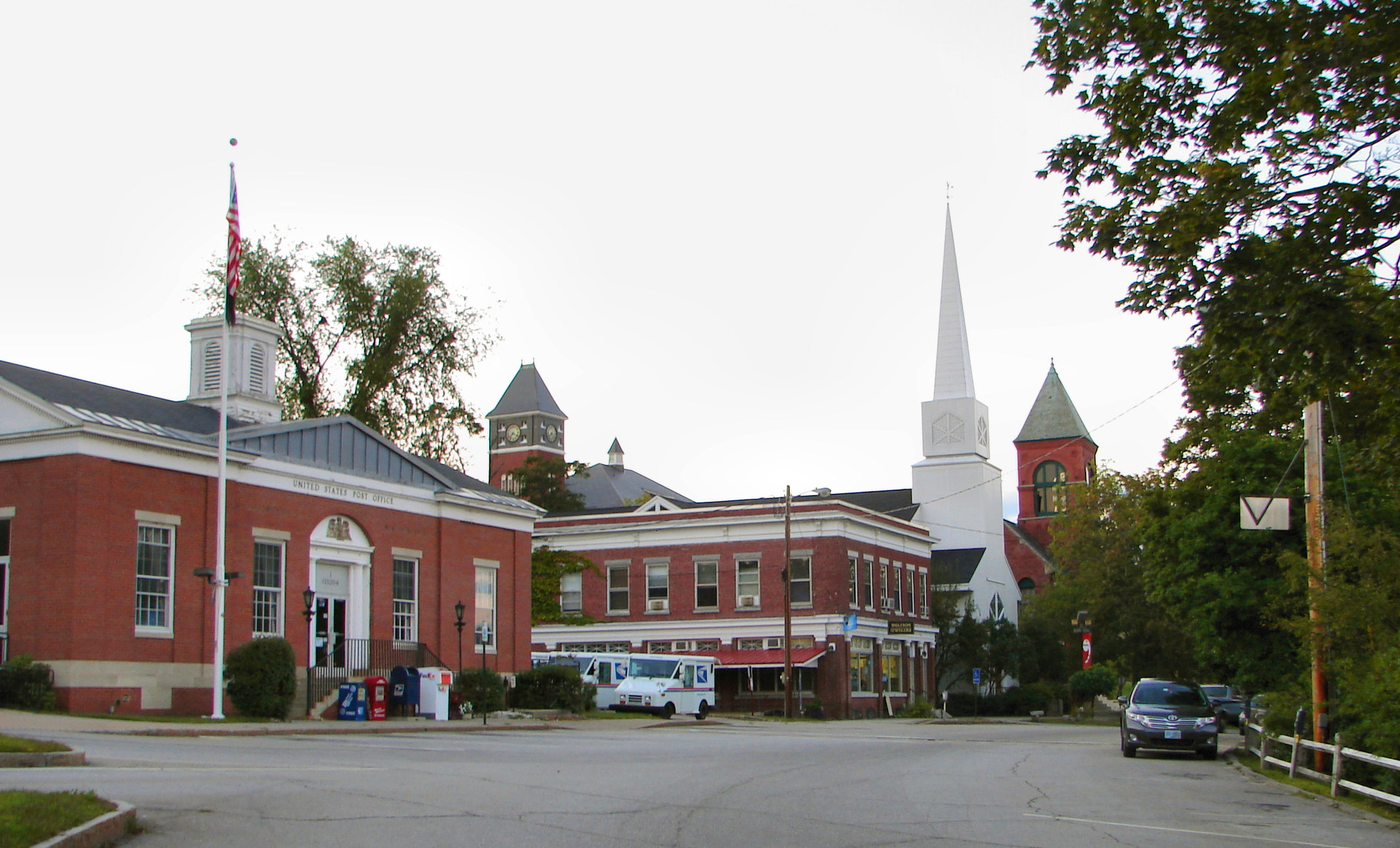
- Town center (left to right): Plymouth Post Office, Rounds Hall of Plymouth State University (in background), Plymouth Congregational Church, Town Hall

- Seal
- Motto: Bridging the Lakes Region and the White Mountains
- Location in Grafton County, New Hampshire
- Coordinates: 43°44′38″N 71°43′20″W
- Country: United States
- State: New Hampshire
- County: Grafton
- Incorporated: 1763
- Named for: Plymouth Colony, Massachusetts
- Villages: Plymouth; West Plymouth

Area
  - Total: 28.6 sq mi (74.2 km^{2})
  - Land: 28.1 sq mi (72.8 km^{2})
  - Water: 0.54 sq mi (1.4 km^{2}) 1.94%
- Elevation: 778 ft (237 m)

Population (2020)
  - Total: 6,682
  - Density: 238/sq mi (91.8/km^{2})
- Time zone: UTC−5 (Eastern)
  - Summer (DST): UTC−4 (Eastern)
- ZIP Code: 03264
- Area code: 603
- FIPS code: 33-62660
- GNIS feature ID: 873702
- Website: www.plymouthnh.gov

Plymouth is a New England town in Grafton County, New Hampshire, United States, in the White Mountains Region. It has a unique role as the economic, medical, commercial, and cultural center for the predominantly rural Plymouth, NH Labor Market Area. Plymouth is located at the confluence of the Pemigewasset and Baker rivers and sits at the foot of the White Mountains. The town's population was 6,682 at the 2020 census. It is home to Plymouth State University, Speare Memorial Hospital, and Plymouth Regional High School.

The town's main center, where 4,730 people resided at the 2020 census (three-quarters of whom are college student age), is defined as the Plymouth census-designated place (CDP), and is located along U.S. Route 3, south of the confluence of the Baker and Pemigewasset rivers.

Plymouth State University, in the center of town, has a total undergraduate population of 3,336 students and a total graduate population of 503 students as of the 2023/2024 academic year.

== History ==
Plymouth was originally the site of an Abenaki village that was burned to the ground by Captain Thomas Baker in 1712. This was just one of the many British raids on American Indian settlements during Queen Anne's War. Part of a large plot of undivided land in the Pemigewasset Valley, the town was first named "New Plymouth", after the original Plymouth Colony in Massachusetts. Colonial Governor Benning Wentworth granted Plymouth to settlers from Hollis, all of whom had been soldiers in the French and Indian War. Some had originally come from Plymouth, Massachusetts. The town was incorporated in 1763. Parts of Hebron and Campton were annexed in 1845 and 1860.

In 1806, then-lawyer Daniel Webster lost his first criminal case at the Plymouth courthouse, which now houses the Historical Society. The author Nathaniel Hawthorne, while on vacation in 1864 with former U.S. President Franklin Pierce, died in Plymouth at the second Pemigewasset House, which was later destroyed by fire in 1909. In the early 20th century, the Draper and Maynard Sporting Goods Company (D&M) sold products directly to the Boston Red Sox, and players such as Babe Ruth would regularly visit to pick out their equipment. The Plymouth Normal School was founded in 1871 out of the already existing Holmes Plymouth Academy, becoming the state's first teachers' college. It would later evolve into Plymouth Teachers' College in 1939, Plymouth State College in 1963, and finally Plymouth State University in 2003.

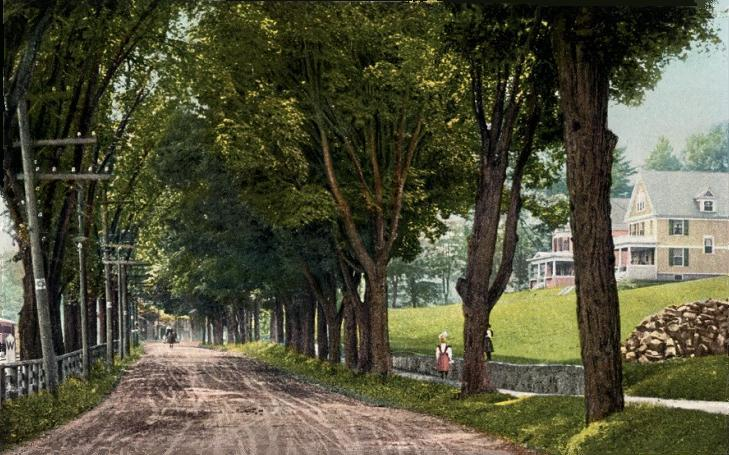
Main Street in 1908

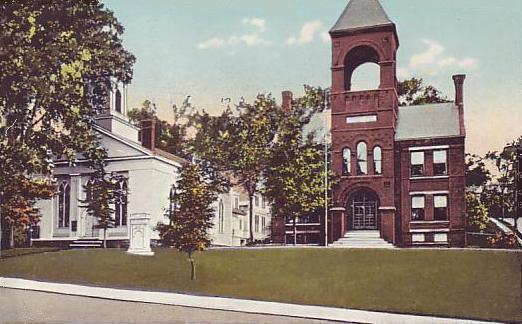
Congregational Church and Town Hall c. 1920

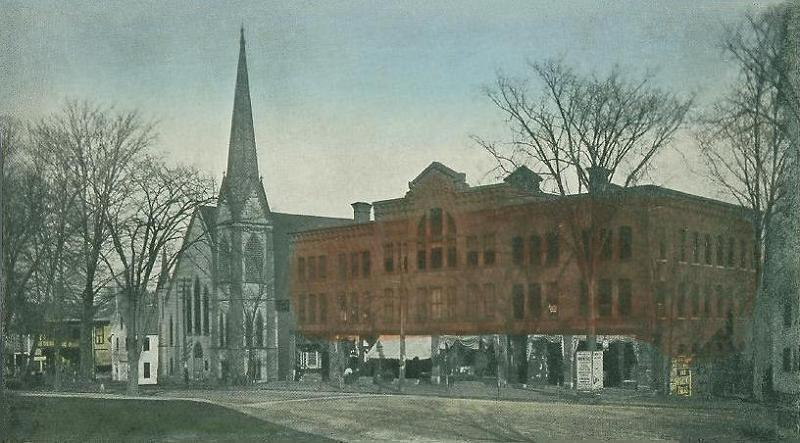
Kidder Block c. 1906

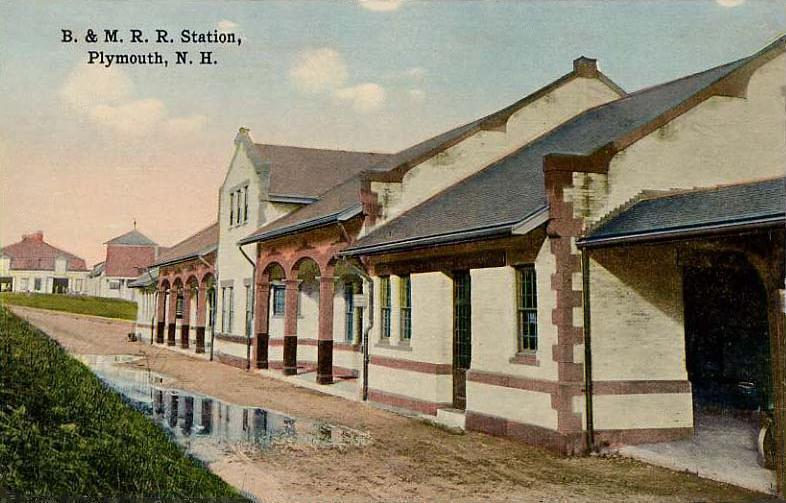
Railroad Station c. 1912

== Geography ==
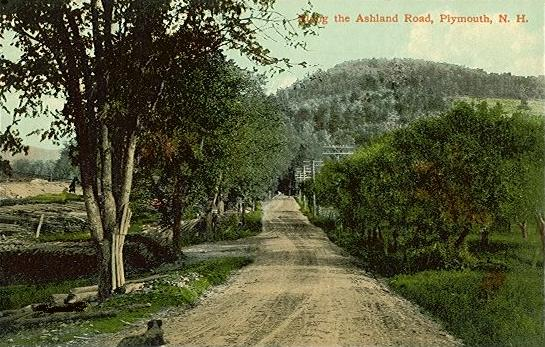
Country scene c. 1910

Plymouth is in central New Hampshire, in the southeastern part of Grafton County, at the southern edge of the White Mountains. It is drained by the Pemigewasset River and its tributary, the Baker River, and lies within the Merrimack River watershed. Plymouth is 42 miles (68 km) north of Concord, the state capital, and 30 miles (48 km) south of the height of land in Franconia Notch.

Plymouth Mountain, at 2,193 feet (668 m) the highest point in Plymouth, is in the south, and the slopes of Tenney Mountain are in the west. (The 2,310-foot (700 m) summit of Tenney Mountain lies to the west in the town of Groton.)

According to the U.S. Census Bureau, the town has a total area of 28.7 square miles (74 km^{2}), of which 28.1 square miles (73 km^{2}) are land and 0.6 square miles (1.6 km^{2}) are water, comprising 1.94% of the town.

The main village of Plymouth, a census-designated place, has a total area of 3.7 square miles (9.7 km^{2}), of which 3.7 square miles (9.5 km^{2}) are land and 0.077 square miles (0.2 km^{2}) (2.31%) are water.

=== Climate ===
According to the Köppen Climate Classification system, Plymouth has a warm-summer humid continental climate, abbreviated "Dfb" on climate maps. The hottest temperature recorded in Plymouth was 102 °F (38.9 °C) on July 5, 1897, while the coldest temperature recorded was −38 °F (−38.9 °C) on February 3, 1898.

Climate data for Plymouth, New Hampshire, 1991–2020 normals, extremes 1887–2007
Month	Jan	Feb	Mar	Apr	May	Jun	Jul	Aug	Sep	Oct	Nov	Dec	Year
Record high °F (°C)	65 (18)	63 (17)	81 (27)	92 (33)	96 (36)	100 (38)	102 (39)	98 (37)	95 (35)	88 (31)	82 (28)	65 (18)	102 (39)
Mean daily maximum °F (°C)	28.8 (−1.8)	33.1 (0.6)	41.2 (5.1)	54.7 (12.6)	67.0 (19.4)	75.1 (23.9)	79.9 (26.6)	78.7 (25.9)	71.8 (22.1)	58.4 (14.7)	45.5 (7.5)	33.7 (0.9)	55.7 (13.1)
Daily mean °F (°C)	18.1 (−7.7)	20.6 (−6.3)	29.6 (−1.3)	41.7 (5.4)	53.2 (11.8)	61.9 (16.6)	67.1 (19.5)	65.2 (18.4)	58.2 (14.6)	46.0 (7.8)	35.2 (1.8)	24.3 (−4.3)	43.4 (6.4)
Mean daily minimum °F (°C)	7.4 (−13.7)	8.2 (−13.2)	17.8 (−7.9)	28.8 (−1.8)	39.4 (4.1)	48.7 (9.3)	54.2 (12.3)	51.7 (10.9)	44.6 (7.0)	33.6 (0.9)	25.0 (−3.9)	14.9 (−9.5)	31.2 (−0.5)
Record low °F (°C)	−35 (−37)	−38 (−39)	−25 (−32)	2 (−17)	18 (−8)	22 (−6)	33 (1)	29 (−2)	18 (−8)	1 (−17)	−13 (−25)	−29 (−34)	−38 (−39)
Average precipitation inches (mm)	3.20 (81)	2.62 (67)	3.15 (80)	3.34 (85)	3.70 (94)	4.43 (113)	4.46 (113)	3.83 (97)	3.55 (90)	4.56 (116)	3.58 (91)	4.03 (102)	44.45 (1,129)
Average snowfall inches (cm)	18.0 (46)	15.7 (40)	13.5 (34)	3.4 (8.6)	0.0 (0.0)	0.0 (0.0)	0.0 (0.0)	0.0 (0.0)	0.0 (0.0)	0.3 (0.76)	3.2 (8.1)	14.2 (36)	68.3 (173.46)
Average precipitation days (≥ 0.01 in)	12.5	8.7	10.5	10.3	13.5	13.3	13.3	11.8	11.6	12.4	11.7	11.7	141.3
Average snowy days (≥ 0.1 in)	9.2	6.3	5.7	1.5	0.0	0.0	0.0	0.0	0.0	0.2	1.9	6.4	31.2
Source 1: NOAA
Source 2: XMACIS2

== Demographics ==
Historical population
Census	Pop.	Note	%±
1790	625		—
1800	743		18.9%
1810	937		26.1%
1820	983		4.9%
1830	1,175		19.5%
1840	1,282		9.1%
1850	1,290		0.6%
1860	1,407		9.1%
1870	1,409		0.1%
1880	1,719		22.0%
1890	1,852		7.7%
1900	1,972		6.5%
1910	2,200		11.6%
1920	2,353		7.0%
1930	2,470		5.0%
1940	2,533		2.6%
1950	3,039		20.0%
1960	3,210		5.6%
1970	4,225		31.6%
1980	5,094		20.6%
1990	5,811		14.1%
2000	5,892		1.4%
2010	6,990		18.6%
2020	6,682		−4.4%
U.S. Decennial Census

As of the census of 2010, there were 6,990 people, 1,953 households, and 947 families residing in the town. The population density was 248.8 inhabitants per square mile (96.1/km^{2}). There were 2,231 housing units at an average density of 30.6 units/km^{2} (79.4 units/sq mi). The racial makeup of the town was 95.6% White, 1.0% African American, 0.3% Native American, 1.1% Asian, 0.5% some other race, and 1.6% from two or more races. Of the population 1.9% were Hispanic or Latino of any race.

There were 1,953 households, out of which 24.1% had children under the age of 18 living with them, 37.1% were headed by married couples living together, 8.6% had a female householder whose husband did not live with her, and 50.1% were non-families. 28.6% of all households were made up of individuals, and 9.9% were someone living alone who was 65 years of age or older. The average household size was 2.41, and the average family size was 2.89.

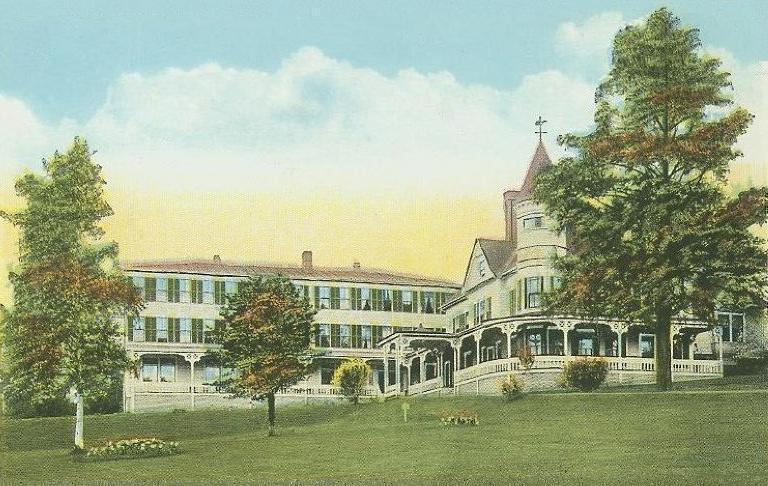
Hotel Pemigewasset in 1922

In the town, the population was spread out, with 12.0% under the age of 18, 50.4% from 18 to 24, 13.3% from 25 to 44, 16.3% from 45 to 64, and 8.0% who were 65 years of age or older. The median age was 21.7 years. For every 100 females, there were 109.2 males. For every 100 females age 18 and over, there were 108.6 males.

For the period 2009–2013, the estimated median annual income for a household in the town was $41,709, and the median income for a family was $79,453. Male full-time workers had a median income of $52,297 versus $28,851 for females. The per capita income for the town was $19,804. 22.5% of the population and 3.3% of families were below the poverty line. Out of the total people living in poverty, 4.3% were under the age of 18 and 9.8% were 65 or older.

== Recreation ==
- Fox Pond Park
- Langdon Park and Walking Trails
- Walter-Newton Natural Area
- Sutherland Hiking Trail (on Plymouth Mountain)
- Plymouth Skate Park
- Quincy Bog
- Livermore Falls Hiking and River Jump

== Sites of interest ==
- Boy Scout Fountain on the Common (one of only two Boy Scout Fountains in the USA)
- The Flying Monkey Movie House and Performance Center (formerly the Plymouth Theater)
- Fox Park
- Lamson Library at Plymouth State University
- Pease Public Library
- Plymouth Historical Museum
- Russell House (oldest standing residential building in the town; now Plymouth State Admissions)
- Smith Millennium Bridge (a covered bridge over the Baker River)

== Government ==
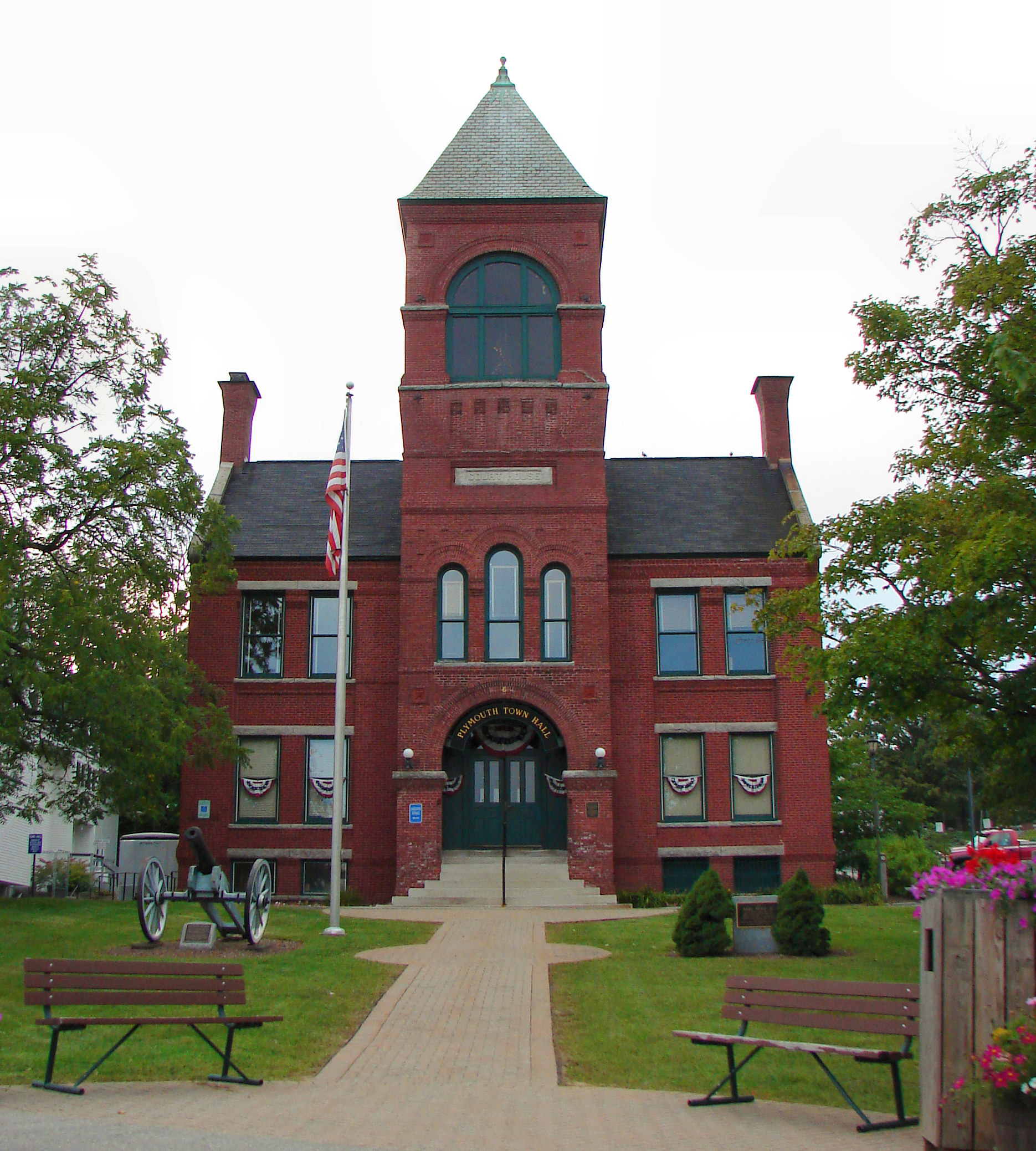
Plymouth Town Hall

=== Town government and officials ===
Plymouth is governed in the traditional New England style, with a five-member board of selectmen as its executive branch, and the traditional town meeting as its legislative branch. Municipal elections and town meetings are customarily held in March.

Office	Name
Select board	Zach Tirrell, Chair
	Ted Wisniewski, Vice-Chair
	Maryann Barnsley
	Jason Neenos
	Phil LaMoreaux
Town clerk	Aimee K Lee
Deputy clerk	Melinda Barnsley
Town manager	Vacant
Police chief	Nate Buffington
Fire chief	Kevin Pierce

=== Local, state and federal officials ===
Plymouth, like all other towns in New Hampshire, elects official representatives at the county, state and federal levels. These officials represent the various jurisdictions in which the town of Plymouth lies, and none of them represent the town exclusively. Each official is elected in his or her own district. Currently, Plymouth is situated in New Hampshire's 2nd congressional district, the State House of Representatives Grafton County District 8, State Senate District 2, and Executive Council District 1.

Office	Name	Political Party
County Commissioner	Marcia Morris	Democratic
County Treasurer	Karen Liot Hill	Democratic
County Sheriff	Jeff Stiegler	Democratic
County Attorney	Martha Ann Hornick	Democratic
County Registrar of Deeds	Kelley Monahan	Democratic
County Registrar of Probate	Rebecca Wyman	Republican
State Representatives	Bill Bolton	Democratic
	Sallie Fellows	Democratic
	Peter Lovett	Democratic
State Senator	Suzanne Prentiss	Democratic
Executive Councilor	Michael J. Cryans	Democratic
Member of the U.S. House of Representatives	Ann McLane Kuster	Democratic

== Notable people ==
- William F. Batchelder (1926–2019), New Hampshire Supreme Court associate justice
- Henry W. Blair (1834–1920), US senator, congressman
- Eliza Coupe (born 1981), actress (Happy Endings, Scrubs)
- Marian Douglas (1842-1913), poet and short story writer
- Irene Clark Durrell (1852–1914), educator
- William A. Fletcher (1788–1852), Chief Justice of the Michigan Supreme Court, born in Plymouth
- Robert Frost (1874–1963), poet
- Jed Hoyer (born 1973), president baseball operations for the Chicago Cubs
- Harl Pease (1917–1942), World War II pilot, Medal of Honor recipient
- Daniel Webster (1782–1852), US senator, congressman from Massachusetts
