= Paul Robeson High School =

Paul Robeson High School can refer to:

- Paul Robeson High School (Illinois), school in Chicago, USA
- Paul Robeson High School for Business and Technology, school in New York City, USA
- Paul Robeson High School for Human Services, school in Philadelphia, USA
