= Chapel of the Holy Cross (Holderness, New Hampshire) =

Historic church in New Hampshire, United States

- U.S. National Register of Historic Places
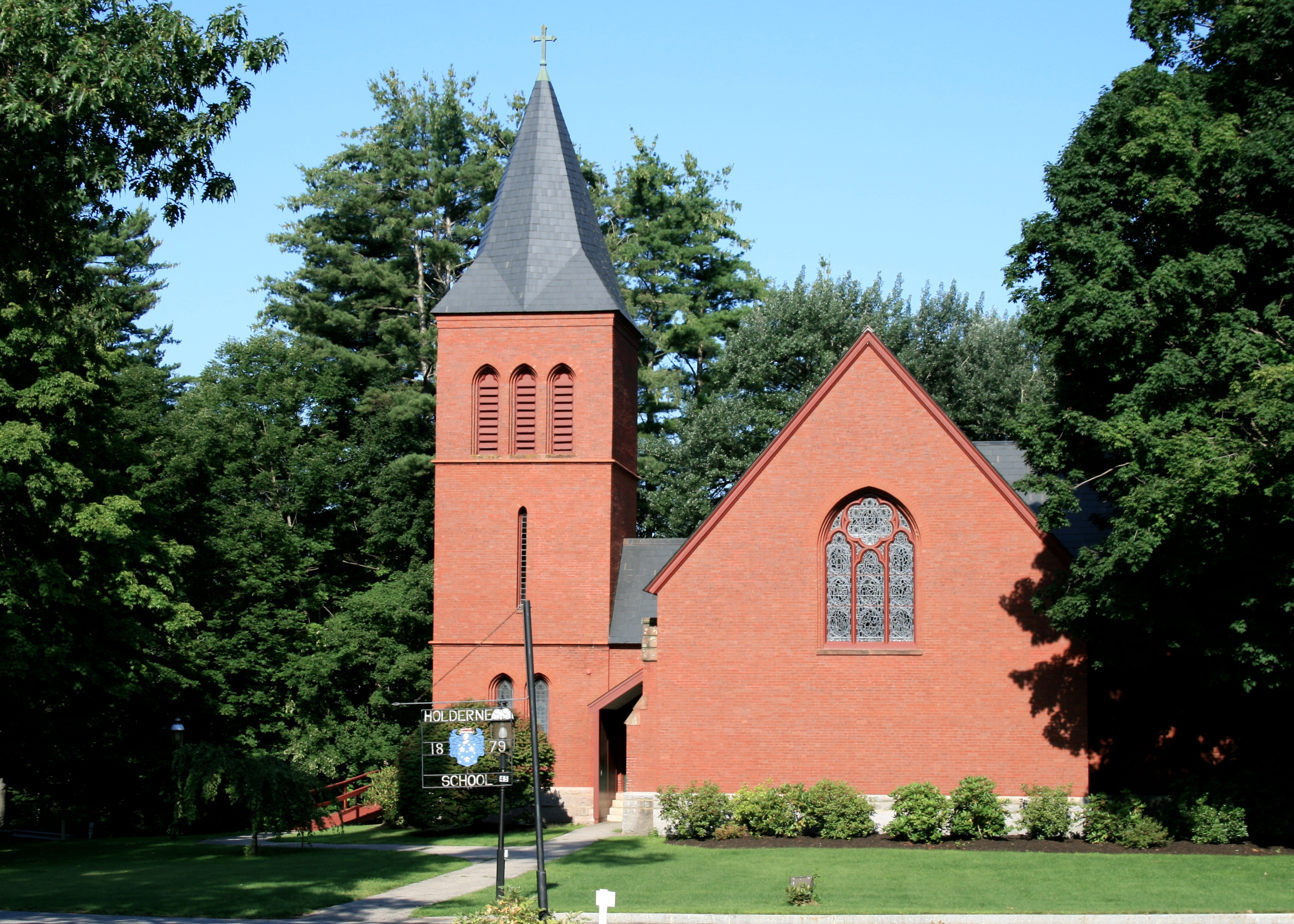

- Location within New Hampshire Location within the United States
- Location: 45 Chapel Ln., Holderness, New Hampshire
- Coordinates: 43°45′31″N 71°40′31″W
- Area: less than one acre
- Built: 1884
- Architect: Haight, Charles Coolidge; Head & Dowst
- Architectural style: Gothic
- NRHP reference No.: 05000971
- Added to NRHP: September 07, 2005

The Chapel of the Holy Cross is a historic Episcopal church at 45 Chapel Lane on the campus of Holderness School in Holderness, New Hampshire. Built in 1884 to a design by Charles Coolidge Haight, it is a prominent regional example of Gothic Revival architecture. The building was listed on the National Register of Historic Places in 2005.

== Description and history ==
The Chapel of the Holy Cross occupies a prominent location near the center of the Holderness School campus, separated from New Hampshire Route 175 by the school's athletic fields. It is a single-story brick building, with its long axis oriented east-west. Its main entrances are on the long south side, the eastern one set facing east in a projecting brick vestibule, and the western one sheltered by a wooden porch. The vestibule extends further to a square three-stage tower, which is topped by an octagonal steeple and cross.

The masonry Gothic Revival building was built in 1884 to a design by Charles Coolidge Haight. It was paid for by a gift from Sarah Titus Zabriskie. The building has undergone only modest external changes since its construction, the most notable being the 1957 enlargement of the organ wing on the north side to accommodate an organ the school had acquired from the Castle in the Clouds estate. The chapel's 19th century stained glass windows (maker unknown, but speculated to be the New York studio of J & R Lamb) were replaced in the 1930s and 1940s, in part by original windows by the studio of Charles Jay Connick, and in part by windows that had been removed from the All Saints Church in Peterborough, and adapted to their new location by Connick.

== See also ==
- National Register of Historic Places listings in Grafton County, New Hampshire
