= Mad River (Pemigewasset River tributary) =

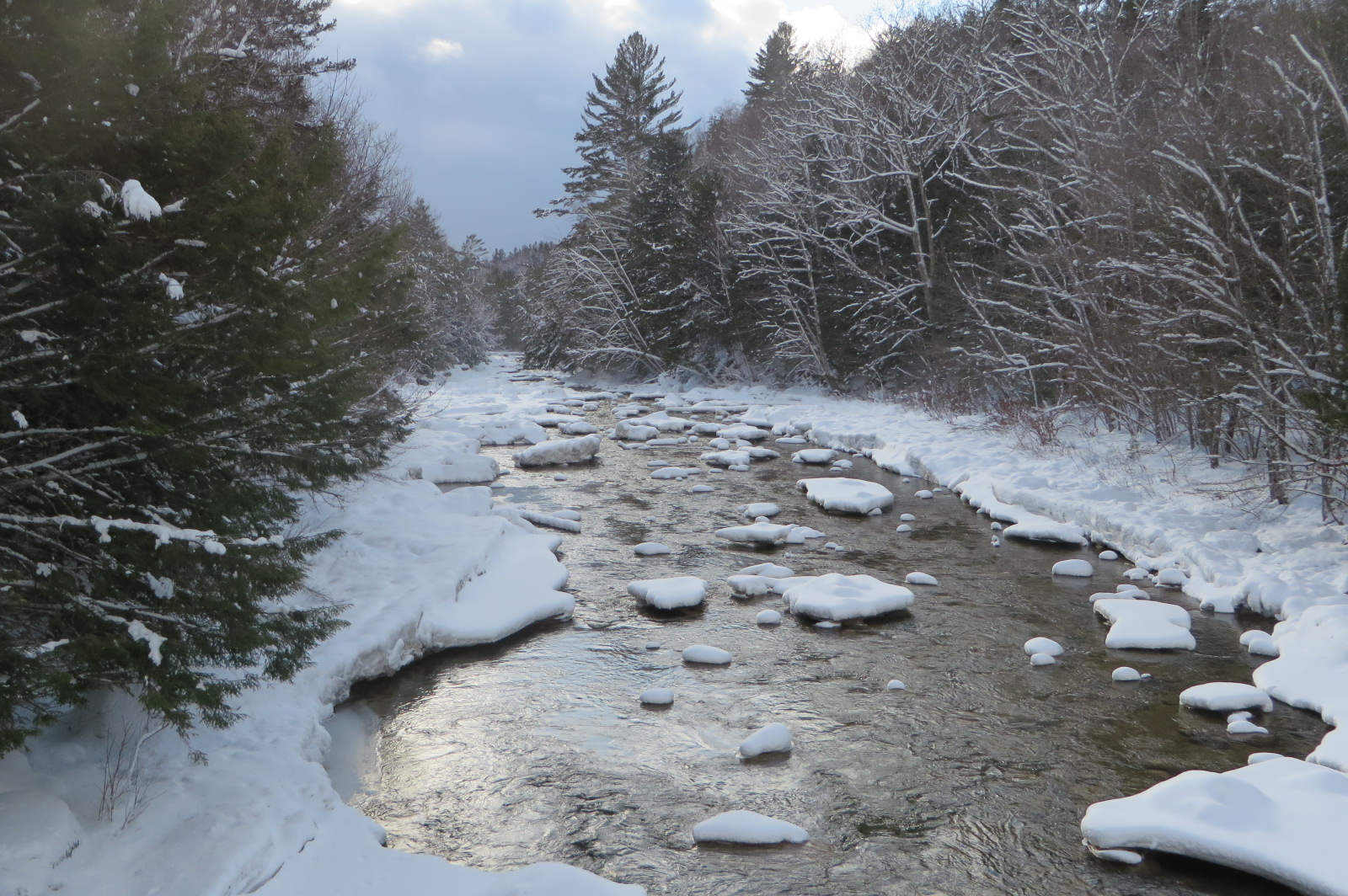
- The Mad River at Upper Mad River Road bridge between Thornton and Waterville Valley

- Location within New Hampshire Location within the United States

Location
- Country: United States
- State: New Hampshire
- County: Grafton
- Towns: Livermore, Waterville Valley, Thornton, Campton

Physical characteristics
- Source: Greeley Ponds
  - location: White Mountain National Forest
  - coordinates: 44°0′42″N 71°30′25″W
  - elevation: 2,240 ft (680 m)
- Mouth: Pemigewasset River
  - location: Campton
  - coordinates: 43°50′20″N 71°39′6″W
  - elevation: 543 ft (166 m)
- Length: 17.9 mi (28.8 km)

Basin features
- Tributaries
  - left: Flume Brook, Cascade Brook, Snows Brook, Drakes Brook, Smarts Brook, Chickenboro Brook
  - right: West Branch, Hardy Brook

The Mad River is a 17.9-mile-long (28.8 km) river in the White Mountains of New Hampshire in the United States. It is a tributary of the Pemigewasset River, part of the Merrimack River watershed.

The Mad River begins at the Greeley Ponds in Mad River Notch, a mountain pass between Mount Osceola to the west and Mount Kancamagus to the east, in the township of Livermore. The river descends to the south, followed by the Greeley Pond Trail, to the town of Waterville Valley, where the West Branch enters.

After winding through the Waterville Valley Resort community, the Mad River proceeds southwest over continuous boulder-strewn rapids into a corner of the town of Thornton, eventually settling out in Campton Pond in the town of Campton. Passing over a small hydroelectric dam at Campton Upper Village, the river descends over some small waterfalls and enters the floodplain of the Pemigewasset River, which it joins near Interstate 93.

For most of the river's length below Waterville Valley, it is paralleled by New Hampshire Route 49.

== See also ==
- List of rivers of New Hampshire
