= Pearl River High School =

Pearl River High School may refer to:

- Pearl River High School (Louisiana), US
- Pearl River High School (New York), US

== See also ==
- Pearl River (disambiguation)
- Pearl River Community College, Mississippi, US
