= Campton, New Hampshire =

- Town
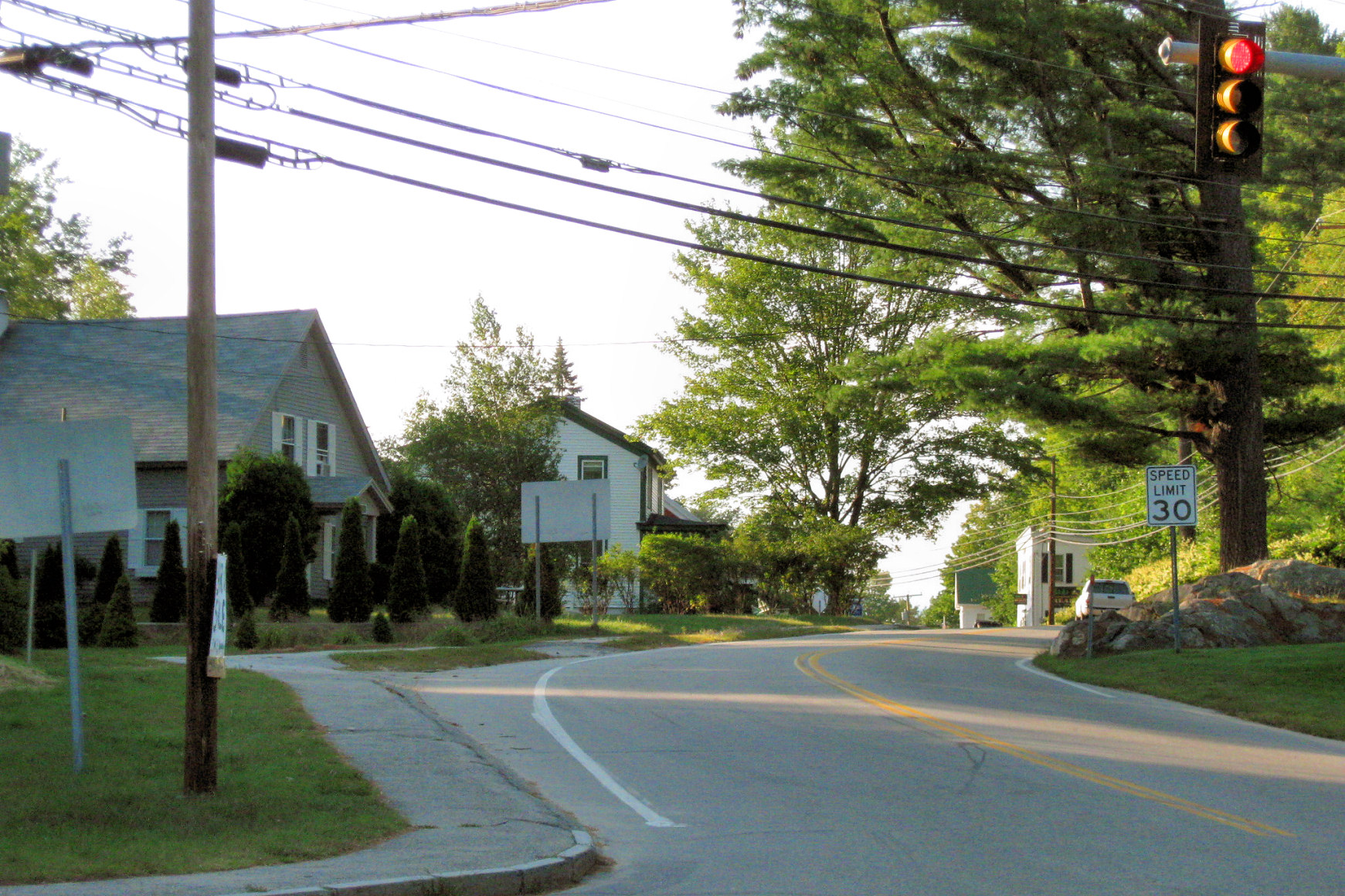
- NH 175 in Campton Upper Village

- Seal

- Location in Grafton County, New Hampshire
- Coordinates: 43°49′39″N 71°38′42″W
- Country: United States
- State: New Hampshire
- County: Grafton
- Incorporated: 1767
- Villages: Beebe River; Campton Hollow; Campton Lower Village; Campton Upper Village; West Campton

Area
  - Total: 52.5 sq mi (136.1 km^{2})
  - Land: 51.9 sq mi (134.3 km^{2})
  - Water: 0.69 sq mi (1.8 km^{2}) 1.33%
- Elevation: 656 ft (200 m)

Population (2020)
  - Total: 3,343
  - Density: 64/sq mi (24.9/km^{2})
- Time zone: UTC-5 (Eastern)
  - Summer (DST): UTC-4 (Eastern)
- ZIP code: 03223
- Area code: 603
- FIPS code: 33-08660
- GNIS feature ID: 873556
- Website: www.camptonnh.gov

Campton is a town in Grafton County, New Hampshire, United States. The population was 3,343 at the 2020 census. Campton, which includes the villages of Blair, Campton Hollow, Lower Campton and West Campton, is home to Blair State Forest and Livermore Falls State Forest. It is located in the foothills of the White Mountains, and parts of the White Mountain National Forest are in the northeast and northwest.

== History ==
Both Campton and adjacent Rumney were granted by Governor Benning Wentworth in 1761 to Jabez Spencer of East Haddam, Connecticut, then settled about 1765. But Captain Spencer died before terms of the charter, which required settlement by 50 families, each farming 5 acres (20,000 m^{2}) for every 50 received, were fulfilled. Two families, named Fox and Taylor, first settled here in 1765. In 1767, Governor John Wentworth issued the heirs and others a new grant. Campton got its name when the first proprietors built a camp here to survey the two towns.

Although the surface is mountainous and ledgy, farmers found good soil for cultivation in the intervales along the rivers. By 1859, when the population was 1,439, industries included one sawmill, one gristmill, one tannery and a carriage shop. The town has three covered bridges, including Blair Bridge, which is 292 feet (89 m), 10 inches long, making it the second longest of those entirely within the state.

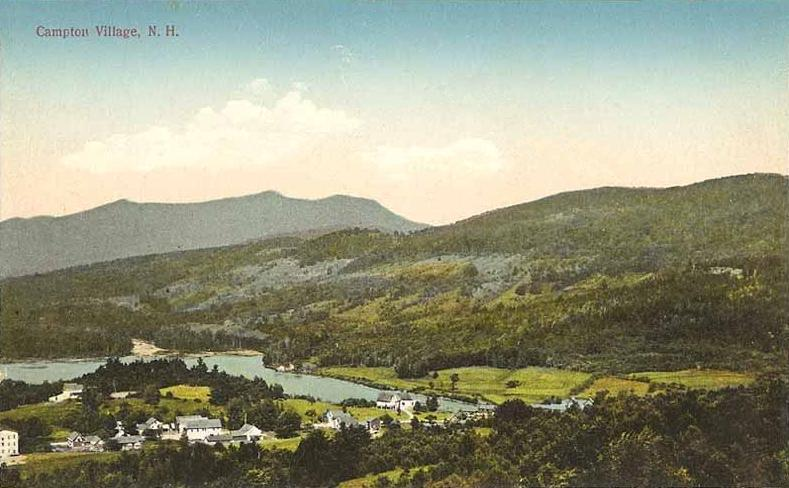
Campton village c. 1910

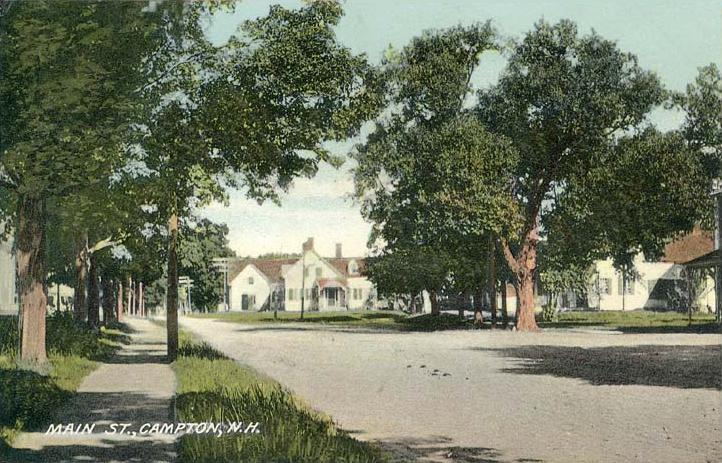
Main Street in 1908

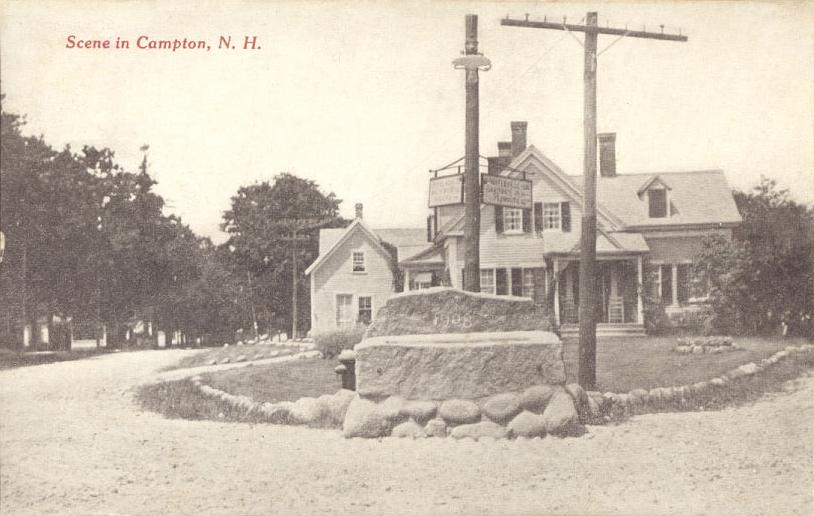
Watering trough in 1916

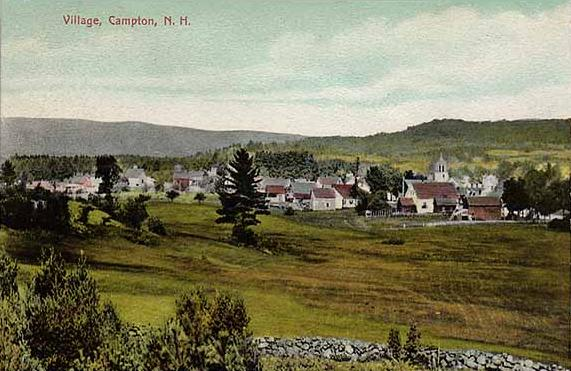
The village c. 1910

== Geography ==
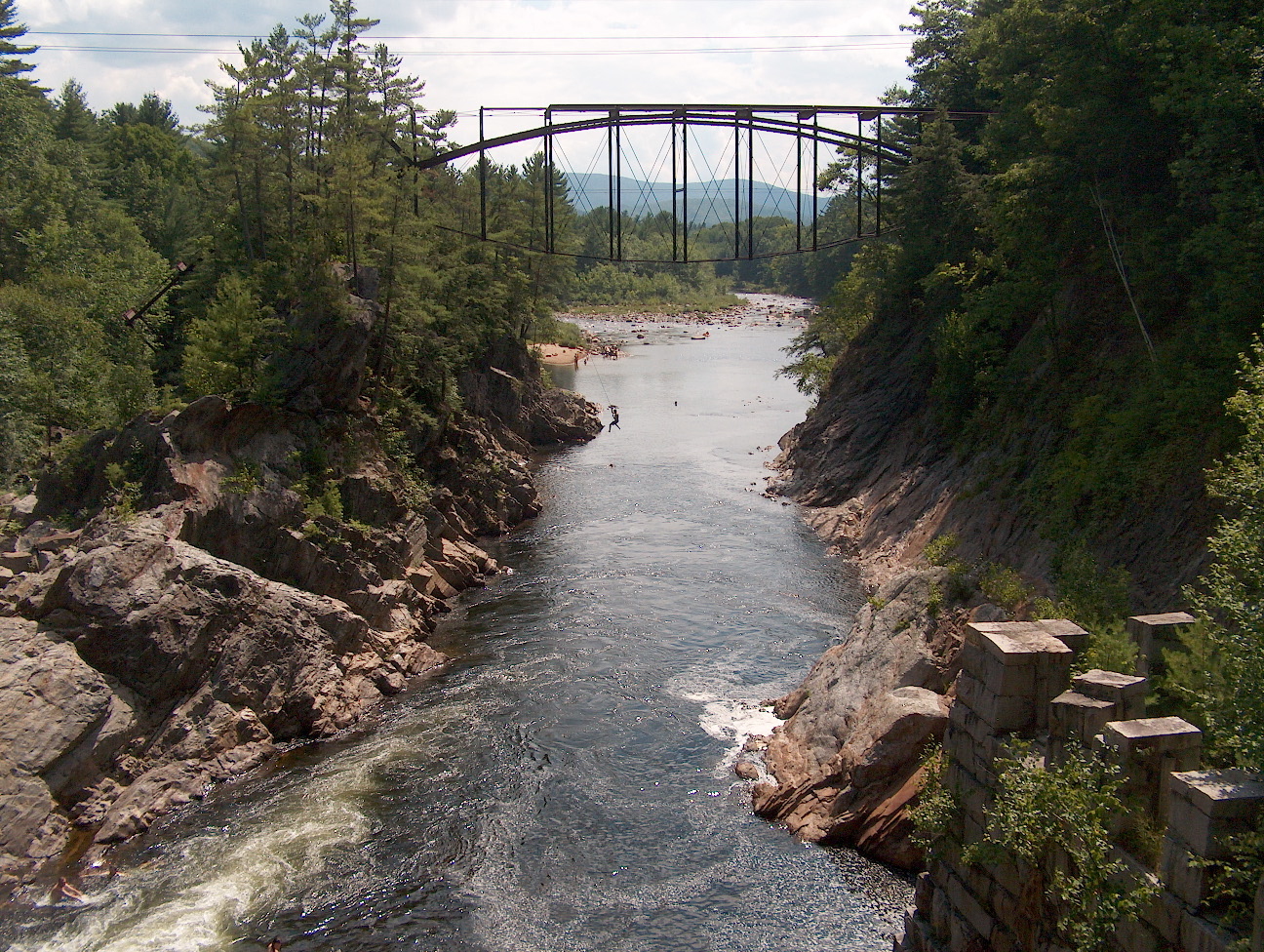
The Pemigewasset River at Livermore Falls

According to the United States Census Bureau, the town has a total area of 52.5 square miles (136.1 km^{2}), of which 51.9 square miles (134.3 km^{2}) are land and 0.69 square miles (1.8 km^{2}) are water, comprising 1.33% of the town. The highest point in Campton is Mount Weetamoo, at 2,548 feet (777 m) above sea level. The town is drained by the Pemigewasset River and its tributaries the Mad River, Beebe River, West Branch Brook, and Bog Brook. Campton lies fully within the Merrimack River watershed.

The town is crossed by Interstate 93, U.S. Route 3, New Hampshire Route 49 and New Hampshire Route 175. Starting with the 2012 election, Campton was redistricted from NH's 2nd Congressional District to New Hampshire's 1st Congressional District; it was the only town in Grafton County to be redistricted.

== Demographics ==
Historical population
Census	Pop.	Note	%±
1790	395		—
1800	635		60.8%
1810	873		37.5%
1820	1,047		19.9%
1830	1,313		25.4%
1840	1,513		15.2%
1850	1,439		−4.9%
1860	1,320		−8.3%
1870	1,226		−7.1%
1880	1,163		−5.1%
1890	982		−15.6%
1900	999		1.7%
1910	845		−15.4%
1920	1,028		21.7%
1930	1,184		15.2%
1940	1,130		−4.6%
1950	1,149		1.7%
1960	1,058		−7.9%
1970	1,171		10.7%
1980	1,694		44.7%
1990	2,377		40.3%
2000	2,719		14.4%
2010	3,333		22.6%
2020	3,343		0.3%
U.S. Decennial Census

As of the census of 2000, there were 2,719 people, 1,128 households, and 759 families residing in the town. The population density was 52.4 inhabitants per square mile (20.2/km^{2}). There were 1,759 housing units at an average density of 33.9 per square mile (13.1/km^{2}). The racial makeup of the town was 98.01% White, 0.04% African American, 0.04% Native American, 0.70% Asian, 0.15% Pacific Islander, and 1.07% from two or more races. Hispanic or Latino of any race were 0.40% of the population.

There were 1,128 households, out of which 30.2% had children under the age of 18 living with them, 54.8% were married couples living together, 8.2% had a female householder with no husband present, and 32.7% were non-families. 25.0% of all households were made up of individuals, and 8.2% had someone living alone who was 65 years of age or older. The average household size was 2.41 and the average family size was 2.89.

In the town, the population was spread out, with 23.8% under the age of 18, 7.2% from 18 to 24, 30.0% from 25 to 44, 27.0% from 45 to 64, and 11.9% who were 65 years of age or older. The median age was 39 years. For every 100 females, there were 99.9 males. For every 100 females age 18 and over, there were 100.1 males.

The median income for a household in the town was $39,213, and the median income for a family was $46,492. Males had a median income of $30,640 versus $24,688 for females. The per capita income for the town was $20,189. About 5.8% of families and 8.8% of the population were below the poverty line, including 9.1% of those under age 18 and 8.5% of those age 65 or over.

== Notable people ==
- Henry W. Blair (1834–1920), US congressman, senator
- Chris Devlin-Young (born 1961), ski racer
- Arthur Livermore (1766–1853), US congressman
- Sylvester Marsh (1803–1884), builder of the Mount Washington Cog Railway

== Sites of interest ==
- Blair Bridge (1829, rebuilt 1870)
- Town House (1855), Campton Historical Society

== See also ==
- White Mountain art
