= Thornton, New Hampshire =

- Town
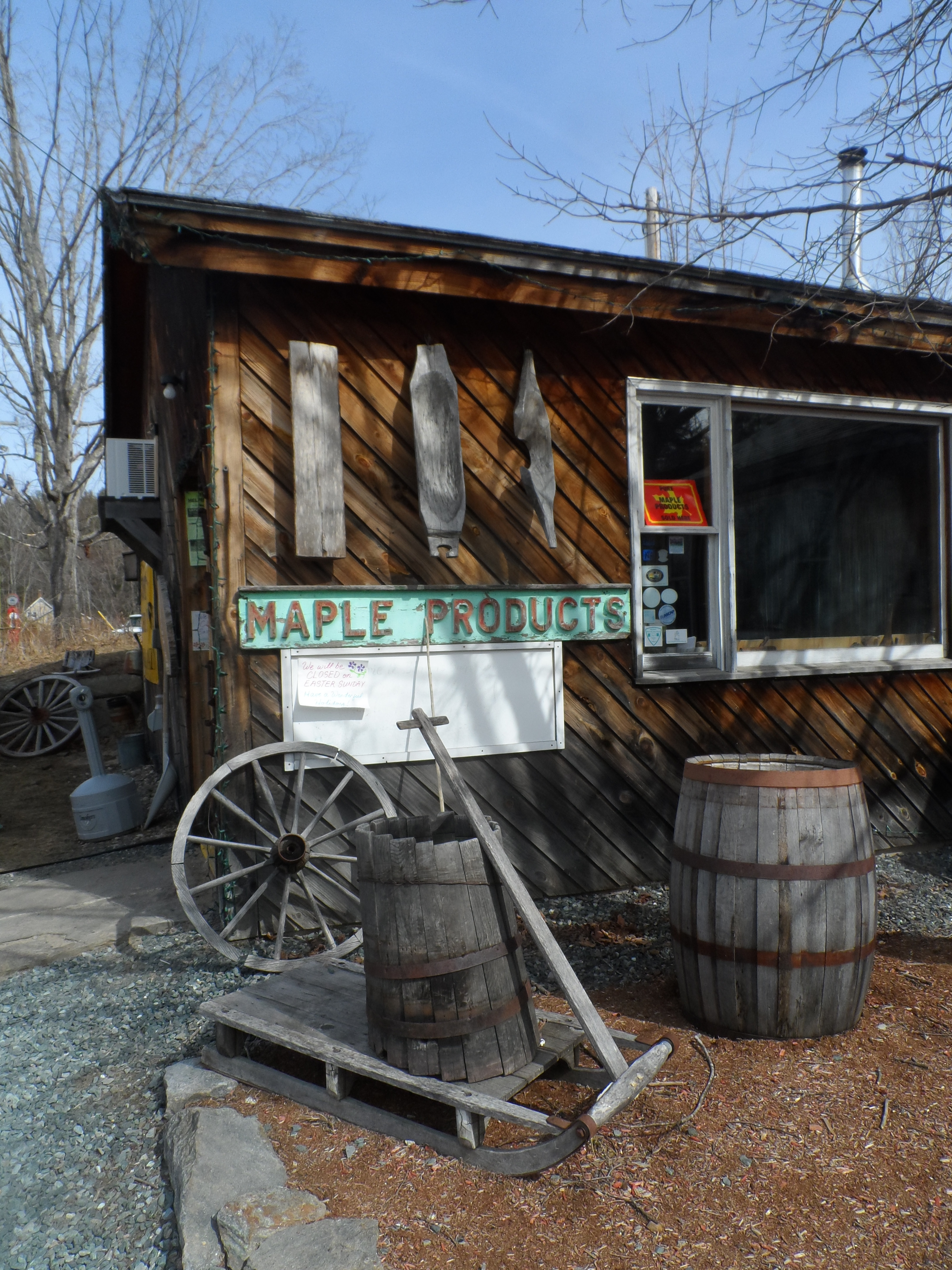
- Sugar shack in Thornton

- Seal

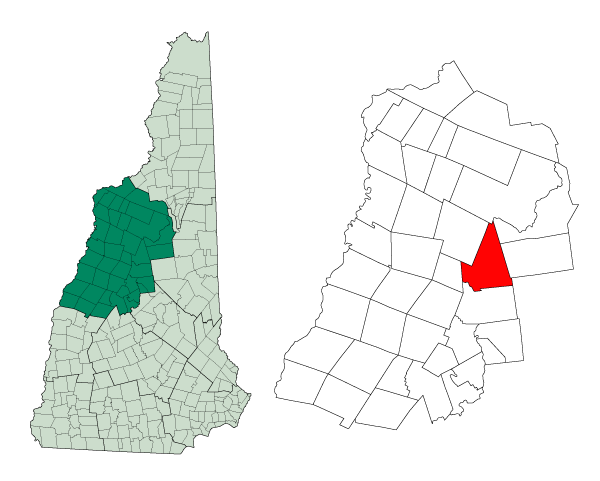
- Location in Grafton County, New Hampshire
- Coordinates: 43°55′20″N 71°38′12″W
- Country: United States
- State: New Hampshire
- County: Grafton
- Incorporated: 1763
- Villages: Thornton; West Thornton

Area
  - Total: 50.7 sq mi (131.3 km^{2})
  - Land: 50.1 sq mi (129.7 km^{2})
  - Water: 0.62 sq mi (1.6 km^{2}) 1.19%
- Elevation: 1,125 ft (343 m)

Population (2020)
  - Total: 2,708
  - Density: 54/sq mi (20.9/km^{2})
- Time zone: UTC-5 (Eastern)
  - Summer (DST): UTC-4 (Eastern)
- ZIP code: 03285
- Area code: 603
- FIPS code: 33-76740
- GNIS feature ID: 873738
- Website: www.townofthornton.org

Thornton is a town in Grafton County, New Hampshire, United States. The population was 2,708 at the 2020 census, up from 2,490 at the 2010 census.

== History ==
Thornton was granted on July 6, 1763, and incorporated on November 20, 1781. It is named for Doctor Matthew Thornton, a signer of the Declaration of Independence.

== Geography ==
According to the United States Census Bureau, the town has a total area of 50.7 square miles (131.3 km^{2}), of which 50.1 square miles (129.7 km^{2}) are land and 0.6 square miles (1.6 km^{2}) are water, comprising 1.19% of the town. The Pemigewasset River crosses the west side of the town and drains the town via its tributaries Eastman Brook, Mill Brook, Hubbard Brook, the Mad River, and others. Via the Pemigewasset, the town is part of the Merrimack River watershed. The highest point in Thornton is 2,580 feet (790 m) above sea level on the western ridge of Dickey Mountain, whose 2,734-foot (833 m) summit lies in the neighboring town of Waterville Valley.

The White Mountain National Forest covers most of the eastern side of the town.

== Demographics ==
Historical population
| Census | Pop. | Note | %± |
|---|---|---|---|
| 1790 | 385 | | — |
| 1800 | 535 | | 39.0% |
| 1810 | 794 | | 48.4% |
| 1820 | 857 | | 7.9% |
| 1830 | 1,049 | | 22.4% |
| 1840 | 1,045 | | −0.4% |
| 1850 | 1,011 | | −3.3% |
| 1860 | 967 | | −4.4% |
| 1870 | 840 | | −13.1% |
| 1880 | 775 | | −7.7% |
| 1890 | 632 | | −18.5% |
| 1900 | 552 | | −12.7% |
| 1910 | 553 | | 0.2% |
| 1920 | 477 | | −13.7% |
| 1930 | 459 | | −3.8% |
| 1940 | 501 | | 9.2% |
| 1950 | 460 | | −8.2% |
| 1960 | 480 | | 4.3% |
| 1970 | 594 | | 23.8% |
| 1980 | 952 | | 60.3% |
| 1990 | 1,505 | | 58.1% |
| 2000 | 1,843 | | 22.5% |
| 2010 | 2,490 | | 35.1% |
| 2020 | 2,708 | | 8.8% |
U.S. Decennial Census

At the 2000 census, there were 1,843 people, 759 households, and 507 families living in the town. The population density was 36.6 inhabitants per square mile (14.1/km^{2}). There were 1,487 housing units at an average density of 29.5 per square mile (11.4/km^{2}). The racial makeup of the town was 97.61% White, 0.27% African American, 0.11% Native American, 0.27% Asian, 0.05% Pacific Islander, 0.33% from other races, and 1.36% from two or more races. Hispanic or Latino of any race were 0.71%.

Of the 759 households 29.6% had children under the age of 18 living with them, 56.5% were married couples living together, 6.6% had a female householder with no husband present, and 33.2% were non-families. 21.1% of households were one person and 6.6% were one person aged 65 or older. The average household size was 2.43 and the average family size was 2.86.

The age distribution was 22.4% under the age of 18, 7.5% from 18 to 24, 33.1% from 25 to 44, 24.6% from 45 to 64, and 12.4% 65 or older. The median age was 38 years. For every 100 females, there were 99.2 males. For every 100 females age 18 and over, there were 102.5 males.

The median household income was $38,380 and the median family income was $45,172. Males had a median income of $27,750 versus $22,938 for females. The per capita income for the town was $18,478. About 6.9% of families and 9.5% of the population were below the poverty line, including 13.5% of those under age 18 and 3.0% of those age 65 or over.

== Notable people ==
- Moses Cheney (1793–1875), 19th century abolitionist
- Karl Drerup (1904–2000), German-American enamels artist
- Orison Swett Marden (1848–1924), hotelier, author
- Nevin S. Scrimshaw (1918–2013), nutritionist, winner of World Food Prize
