= National Association of Free Will Baptists =

Christian denomination

- Abbreviation: NAFWB
- Orientation: Baptist
- Theology: Evangelical
- Polity: Congregational
- Executive Secretary: Dr. Edward E. Moody, Jr.
- Origin: November 5, 1935; Nashville, Tennessee, U.S.
- Congregations: 2,045 (2019)
- Members: 156,895 (2020)
- Official website: https://nafwb.org

The National Association of Free Will Baptists (NAFWB) is a Christian denomination of Free Will Baptist churches in the United States and Canada, organized on November 5, 1935 in Nashville, Tennessee. The NAFWB traces its history in the United States through two different lines: one beginning in the South in 1727 (the "Palmer line") and another in the North in 1780 (the "Randall line"). The denomination is the largest Free Will Baptist body.

== History ==
In 1702, English General Baptist settlers who had immigrated to the Province of Carolina requested help from the General Assembly in England. The General Assembly did not provide the request assistance, so the native minister Paul Palmer had to work there and in 1729 founded the first General Baptist church in North Carolina, in Chowan County, marking the beginning of the Free Will Baptists.

The early General Baptists in North Carolina followed the Standard Confession of Faith and the Orthodox Creed as their official confessions of faith, drafted up by British General Baptists in the 17th century and adopted by their ecclesiastical bodies. They held to general atonement and "personal predestination" or eternal security. Palmer organized at least three churches in North Carolina. From one church in 1729, over 20 churches were established by 1755. After that year, the churches began to decrease and many churches and members became Particular Baptists. By 1770, only four churches and four ministers remained General Baptists. By the end of the 18th century, these churches were being referred to as "Free Will Baptists". In the 19th century, these churches again experienced a new growth, though slowly. They organized various bodies until they finally established the General Conference of Free Will Baptists in 1921. The problem with the history of Paul Palmer, however, stems from the fact that it is uncertain exactly what view of predestination and perseverance he held. In fact, some church historians think Palmer was Calvinistic in his views, since early General Baptists weren't strictly Arminians. Palmer had come from the Welsh Tract Baptist Church, which was openly Calvinist.

Another "Free Will Baptist" movement rose in the North through the work of Benjamin Randall (1749–1808). Randall united with the Regular Baptists in 1776, but broke with them in 1779 due to his more moderate views on predestination. In 1780, Randall formed a "Free Baptist" church in New Durham, New Hampshire. More churches were founded, and in 1792 a Yearly Meeting was organized. This northern or "Randall" line of Free Will Baptists expanded rapidly, but the majority of the churches were absorbed into the mainline Northern Baptist Convention, in 1911. A remnant of churches that didn't join the mainline established the Cooperative General Association of Free Will Baptists in 1917.

Representatives of the "Palmer" (General Conference) and "Randall" (Cooperative General Association) line of Free Will Baptists met at Cofer's Chapel in Nashville, Tennessee, in 1935 and organized the National Association of Free Will Baptists as a merger of the two groups. The new body adopted the Treatise on the Faith and Practice of the Free Will Baptists, which has been revised several times since then. As of August 2005, the denomination claims to have over 2,400 churches in 42 states and 14 foreign countries. The NAFWB is actively involved in missionary work in the United States and throughout the world. The National Association operates a publishing arm called Randall House. Three colleges, Welch College in Nashville; Randall University in Moore, Oklahoma; and Southeastern Free Will Baptist College in Wendell, North Carolina, are affiliated with the denomination. The NAFWB offices are presently maintained in Antioch, Tennessee, a neighborhood of Nashville.

== Theology ==
The churches of the National Association of Free Will Baptists are theologically conservative and hold an Arminian view of salvation, notably in the belief of conditional security and rejection of the belief of eternal security held by many larger bodies of Baptists, such as most of Southern Baptists and adherents of African-American Baptist groups. The Arminian tradition was fashioned in the Netherlands in the 17th century against scholastic Calvinism and its deterministic interpretation of historic Christian teachings about predestination. Similar views, albeit with different emphases from Free Will Baptists, may be found in American Christianity within Methodism and the Restoration movement (e.g., Disciples of Christ, Churches of Christ).

In addition, NAFWB congregations differ from most Baptists in holding that three ordinances, rather than the two observed by most of Protestantism, must be practiced by the church; specifically, in addition to Believer's Baptism (that is, administered to persons able to understand the significance of the ordinance, with a repentant heart) and the Lord's supper practiced by other Baptists, Free Will Baptists also practice the ordinance of the washing of feet. In some churches, anointing with oil is also practiced, depending on local custom.

== Membership ==
Since the middle of the 20th century, membership has remained near 200,000. In 2007, the Association reported having 2,369 churches and 185,798 members. Membership is concentrated in the Southern United States. The states with the highest membership rates are Arkansas, Oklahoma, West Virginia, Alabama, and Kentucky.

The Free Will Baptist North American Ministries (known as Free Will Baptist Home Missions until 2015) has 89 active mission works in 26 states. Their primary role is to send missionaries into North America to plant Free Will Baptist churches. David Crowe is the Director of Home Missions. They generally have anywhere between 50 and 70 missionaries on the field at any given time. As of 2011 they have missionaries in Alabama, Michigan, South Carolina, Alaska, Minnesota, Tennessee, Arizona, Mississippi, Texas, California, New Mexico, Utah, Canada, New York, Virgin Islands, Colorado, Ohio, Virginia, Idaho, Oklahoma, Washington, Illinois, Pennsylvania, West Virginia, Kentucky, Puerto Rico, Wisconsin, Mexico, and Rhode Island.

== Sources ==
- Davidson, William (2001). The Free Will Baptists in History. Nashville: Randall House Publications. ISBN 0-89265-955-6.
- Jones, Dale (2002). Religious Congregations & Membership in the United States 2000. Atlanta: Glenmary Research Center. ISBN 0-914422-26-X.
- Pinson, J. Matthew (1998). A Free Will Baptist Handbook: Heritage, Beliefs, and Ministries. Nashville: Randall House Publications. ISBN 0-89265-688-3.
- Wardin, Albert (1995). Baptists around the World. Nashville: Broadman & Holman. ISBN 0-8054-1076-7.
