= Free Will Baptist Church (New Durham, New Hampshire) =

Historic church in New Hampshire, United States

- U.S. National Register of Historic Places
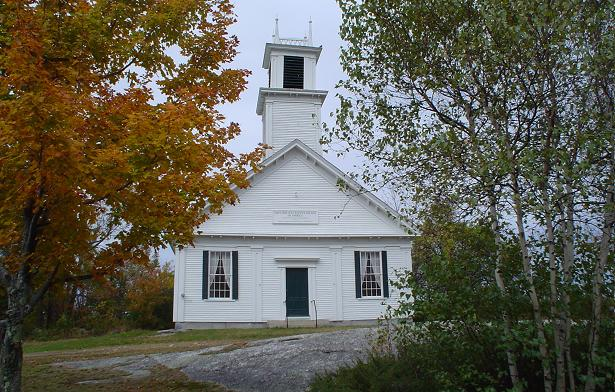

- Location within New Hampshire Location within the United States
- Location: Ridge Rd., New Durham, New Hampshire
- Coordinates: 43°23′59″N 71°9′33″W
- Area: less than one acre
- Built: 1819
- Architectural style: Greek Revival, Italianate
- NRHP reference No.: 80000310
- Added to NRHP: November 13, 1980

The Free Will Baptist Church is a historic church on Ridge Road in New Durham, New Hampshire. Built in 1819, it is considered the mother church of the Free Will Baptist movement, although it was not built until ten years after the death of founder Benjamin Randall. New Durham is where Randall rose to prominence, and where the church's teachings and governance were organized in 1780. The building was listed on the National Register of Historic Places in 1980.

== Description and history ==
The Free Will Baptist Church stands in New Durham's rural Ridge area, on the north side of Ridge Road east of its junction with Berry Road. It is a single-story wood-frame structure, with a gabled roof and clapboarded exterior. It features modest Greek Revival and Italianate detailing, including corner pilasters, and a single central door flanked by pilasters and topped by a simple entablature. The two-stage tower was added in 1869; its detailing, including a box cornice and Italianate brackets, echo details on the main block. The interior includes a late 19th-century pressed metal ceiling.

The church was built in 1819, and is considered the mother church of the Free Will Baptist movement. It was in this area that Benjamin Randall (1749-1808) rose to prominence. A native of New Castle, New Hampshire, Randall, an itinerant evangelical Baptist, was disfellowshipped by more conventional Baptists for his objections to certain Calvinist teachings. He gained a following in eastern New Hampshire and southern Maine. The first organizational meetings of the Free Will Baptists took place in New Durham in 1780; this church was built eleven years after Randall's death.

== See also ==
- National Register of Historic Places listings in Strafford County, New Hampshire
