= Rollinsford Town Hall =

- U.S. National Register of Historic Places
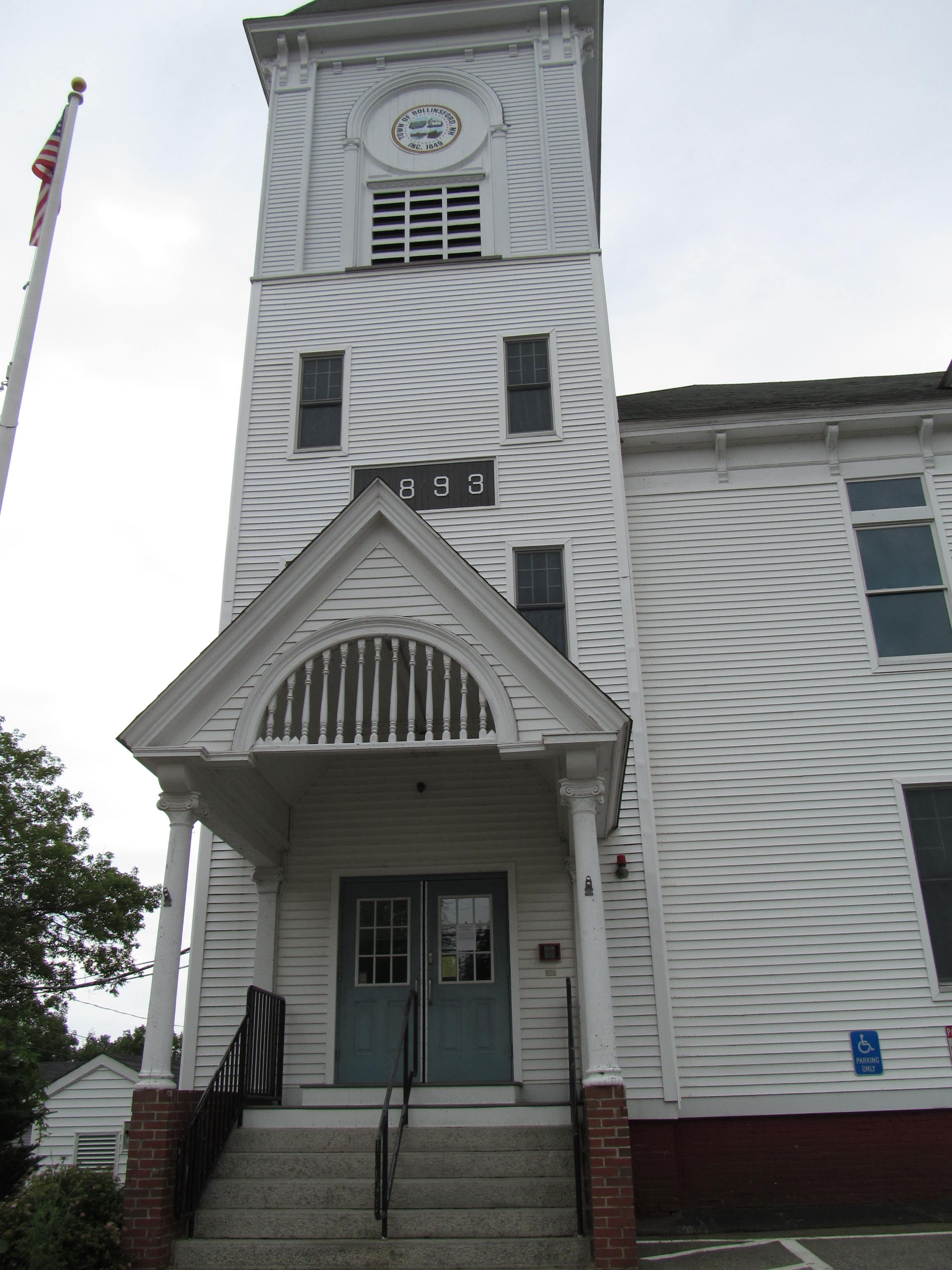

- Location within New Hampshire Location within the United States
- Location: 667 Main St., Rollinsford, New Hampshire
- Coordinates: 43°14′8″N 70°49′17″W
- Area: 0.2 acres (0.081 ha)
- Built: 1894
- Architect: Alvah T. Ramsdell
- Architectural style: Queen Anne
- NRHP reference No.: 99000268
- Added to NRHP: March 5, 1999

Rollinsford Town Hall is located at 667 Main Street in Rollinsford, New Hampshire. The two-story wood-frame building was designed by New Hampshire architect Alvah T. Ramsdell, and built in 1893 to house a variety of municipal services, and an auditorium. The building, still housing municipal offices, was listed on the National Register of Historic Places in 1999.

== Description and history ==
Rollinsford Town Hall is located on the south side of Main Street, at its junction with 4th Street, a few blocks west of the heart of the town's business district. It is a 2 1/2-story wood-frame structure, set on a high brick foundation. A four-story tower projects slightly from the northeast corner, capped by a pyramidal roof. Although the building has been clad in vinyl siding, some of its original Victorian trim is still in place, along the main roof eave and that of the tower. The main entrance is in the base of the tower facing north, sheltered by a gabled porch with round Ionic columns set on brick piers. The gable front is broken by a half-round lunette with spindles descending. Its first floor is occupied by offices, and its upper floor is taken up by an auditorium space with balcony and stage. The basement level, accessible from 4th Street, has a garage door opening which was originally used to house fire equipment.

The building was designed by Alvah Ramsdell, a regionally prominent architect, and was completed in 1893. It is the first of four similar town halls designed by Ramsdell; the others are found in Alton, Wakefield, and New Durham, and share a similarity of layout on the interior, and the presence of a corner tower.

This has been the town's only dedicated town hall. Established in 1849 by separation from Somersworth, the town's municipal functions were held in a variety of private spaces prior to the construction of this building.

== See also ==
- National Register of Historic Places listings in Strafford County, New Hampshire
