= Alvah T. Ramsdell =

American architect

Alvah Thurston Ramsdell
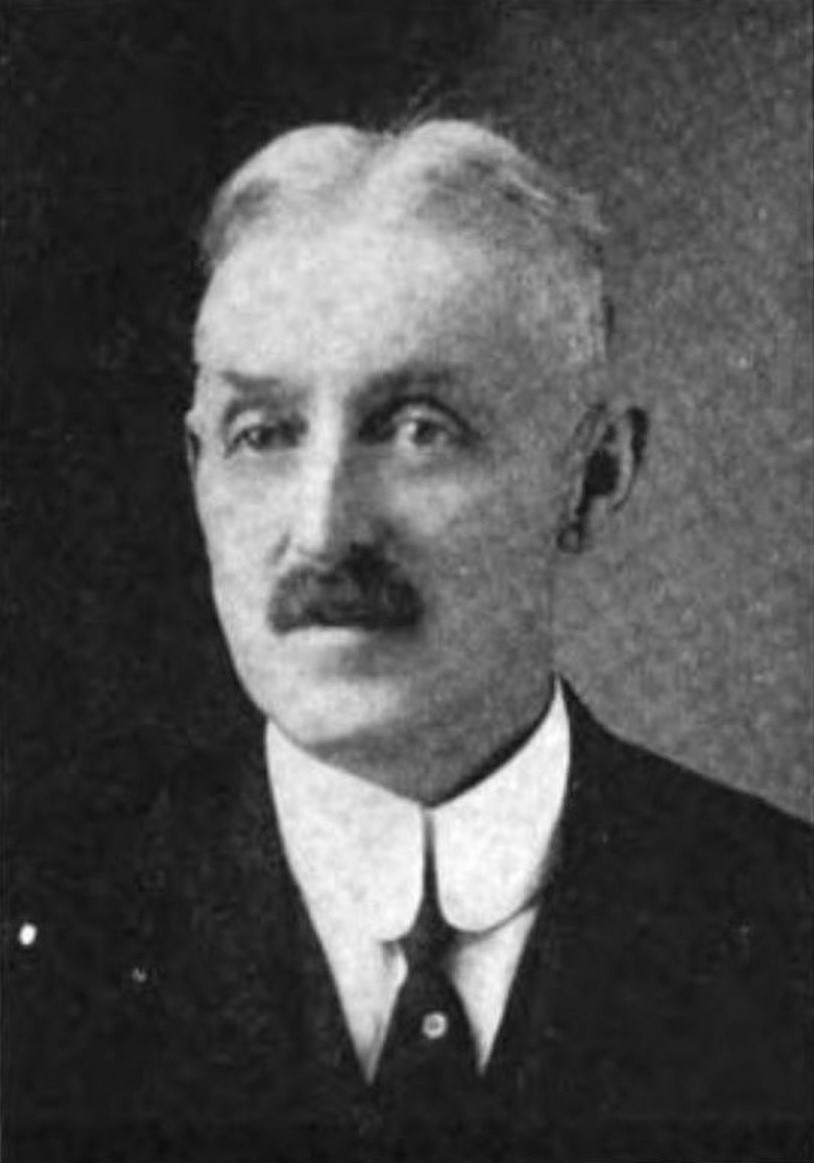
- A. T. Ramsdell, 1919.
- Born: April 15, 1852; York, Maine
- Died: 1928 (aged 75–76); Dover, New Hampshire
- Occupation: Architect

Alvah T. Ramsdell (1852–1928) was an American architect from Dover, New Hampshire. During his career he designed many substantial New Hampshire civic buildings.

Alvah Ramsdell was born April 15, 1852, in York, Maine. He remained there until the age of 18, when he went to South Berwick to learn the carpenter's trade. There, he served a three-year apprenticeship with William A. McIntyre. He stayed for three more years, before going to Boston. There he was employed by several notable contractors, and was kept busy with construction supervision. It was at this time that he took up architecture, studying drawing and design in the city's night schools.

In 1889, Ramsdell went north to Dover, where he opened his own office. He worked as an architect until he was elected state Senator. By the time of his retirement, Ramsdell was Dover's leading architect. He died in 1928.

He designed several buildings which are presently on the National Register of Historic Places.

== Works ==
- 1893 – Rollinsford Town Hall, 667 Main St, Rollinsford, New Hampshire
- 1894 – Alton Town Hall, 1 Monument Sq, Alton, New Hampshire
- 1895 – Strafford Banks Building, 83 Washington St, Dover, New Hampshire
- 1895 – Wakefield Town Hall, 2 High St, Wakefield, New Hampshire
- 1897 – Dover Children's Home, 207 Locust St, Dover, New Hampshire
- 1897 – Wentworth Home for the Aged, 795 Central Ave, Dover, New Hampshire
- 1898 – Chandler School, Green & Pleasant Sts, Somersworth, New Hampshire
- 1902 – North Berwick High School, 21 Main St, North Berwick, Maine
- 1904 – Dover High School, 61 Locust St, Dover, New Hampshire
- 1908 – New Durham Town Hall, 4 Main St, New Durham, New Hampshire
- 1910 – School Street School, 13 School St, Rochester, New Hampshire
- 1911 – Ricker Memorial Chapel, Pine Hill Cemetery, Dover, New Hampshire
- 1913 – Haverhill High School, 9 High St, Woodsville, New Hampshire
- 1913 – Hotel Henderson, 47 Central St, Woodsville, New Hampshire
- 1917 – Spalding School, 18 Maple St, Salisbury, Massachusetts

== Gallery ==
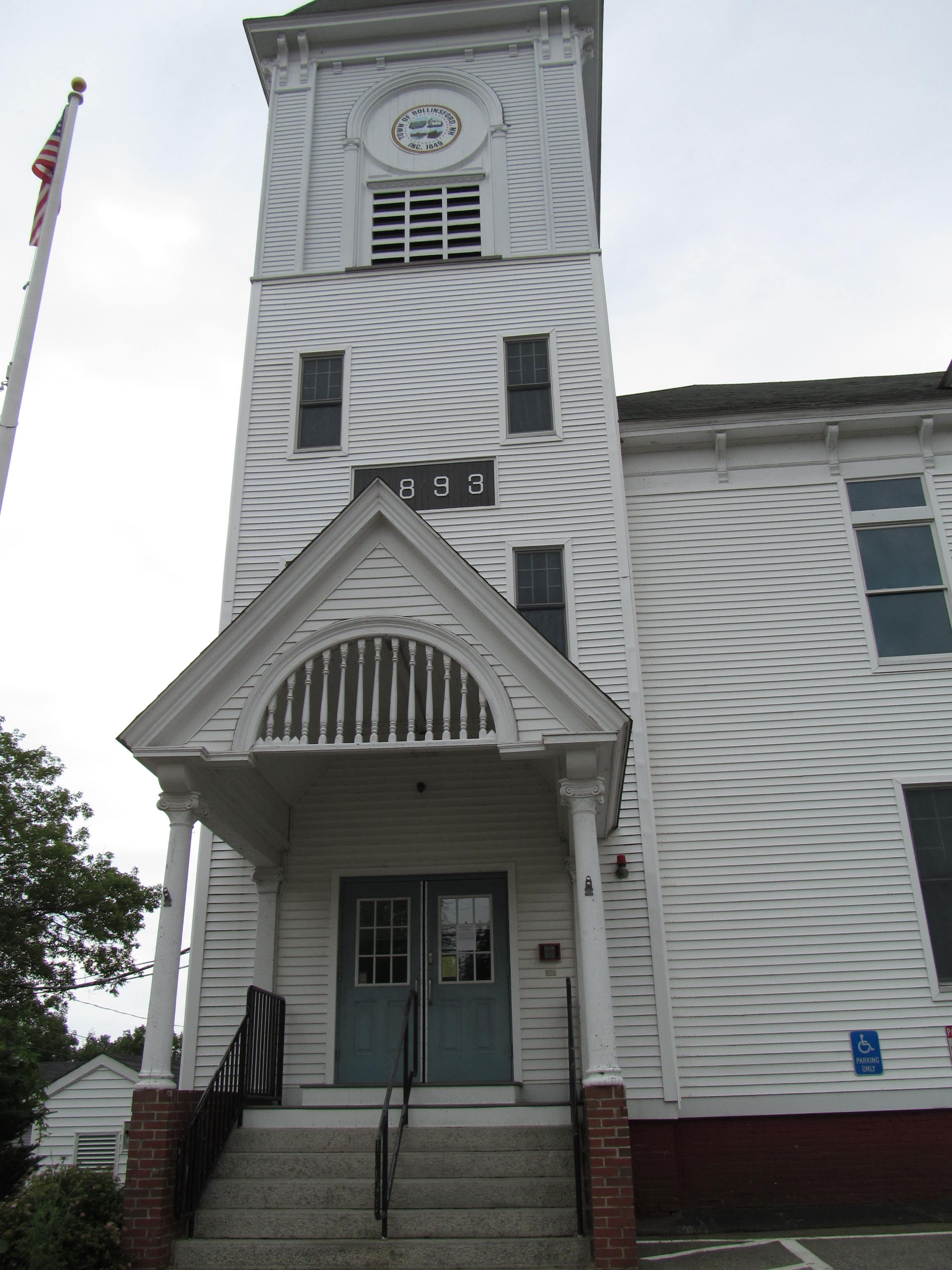
Town Hall, Rollinsford, 1893

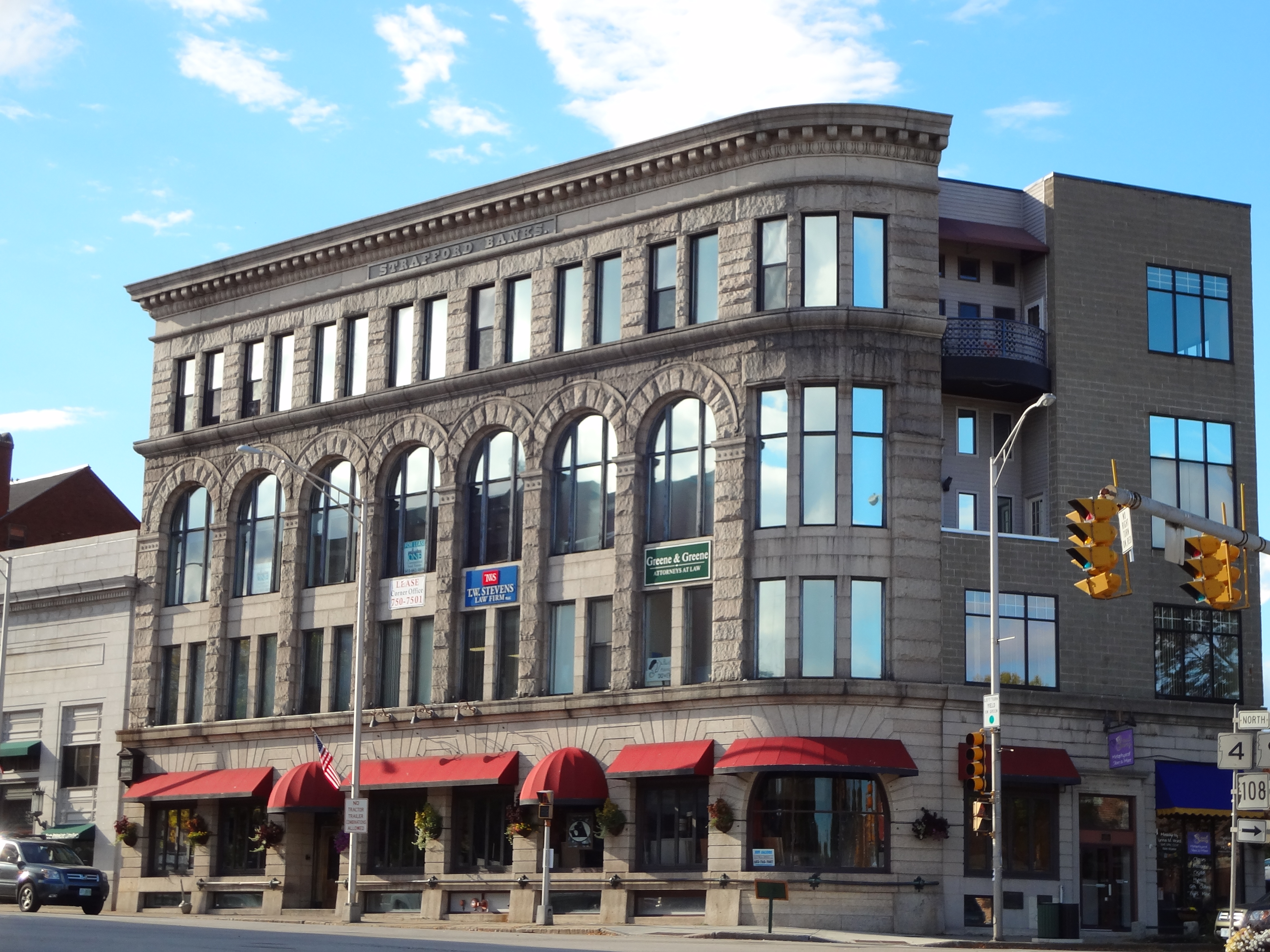
Strafford Banks Building, Dover, 1895

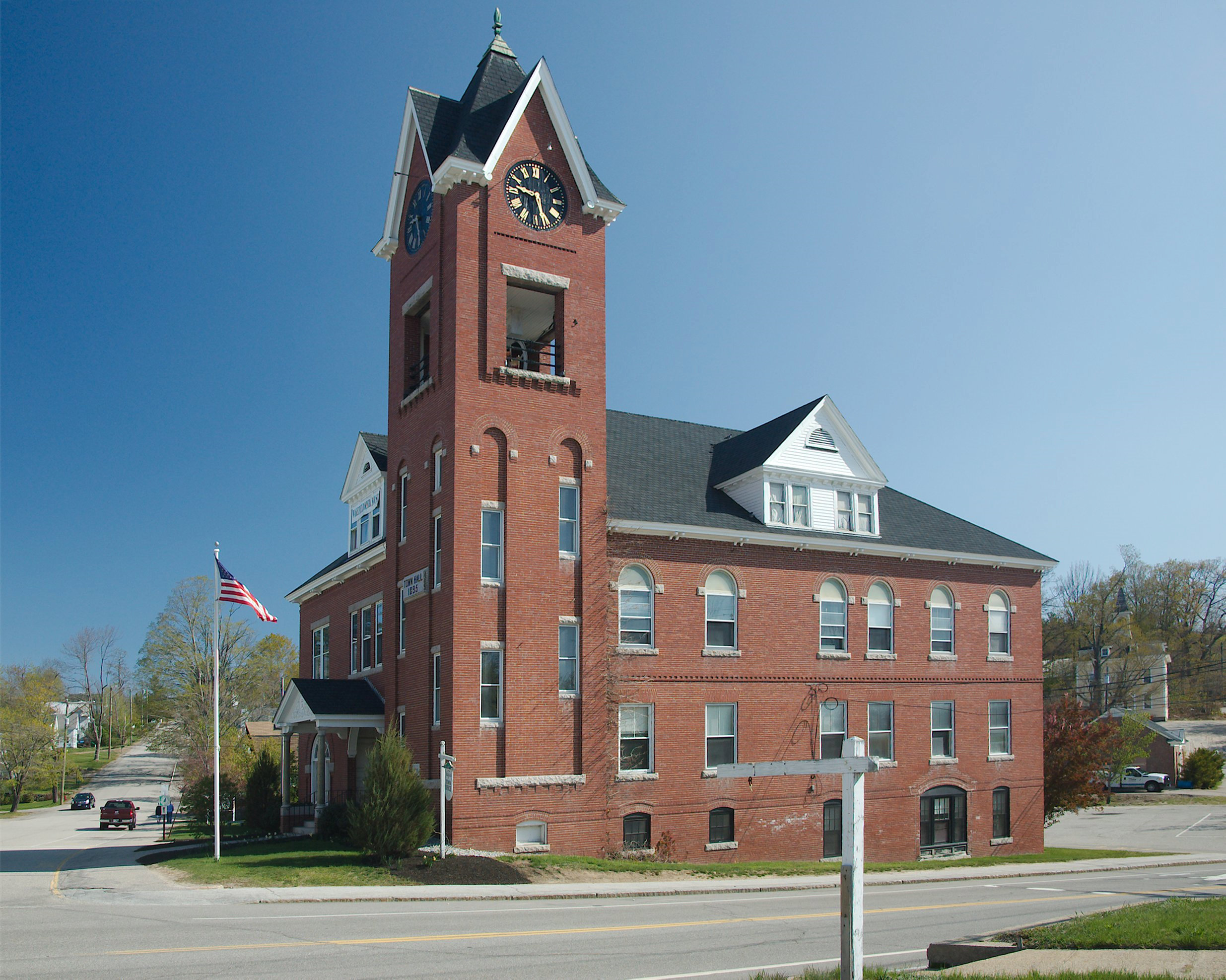
Town Hall, Wakefield, 1895

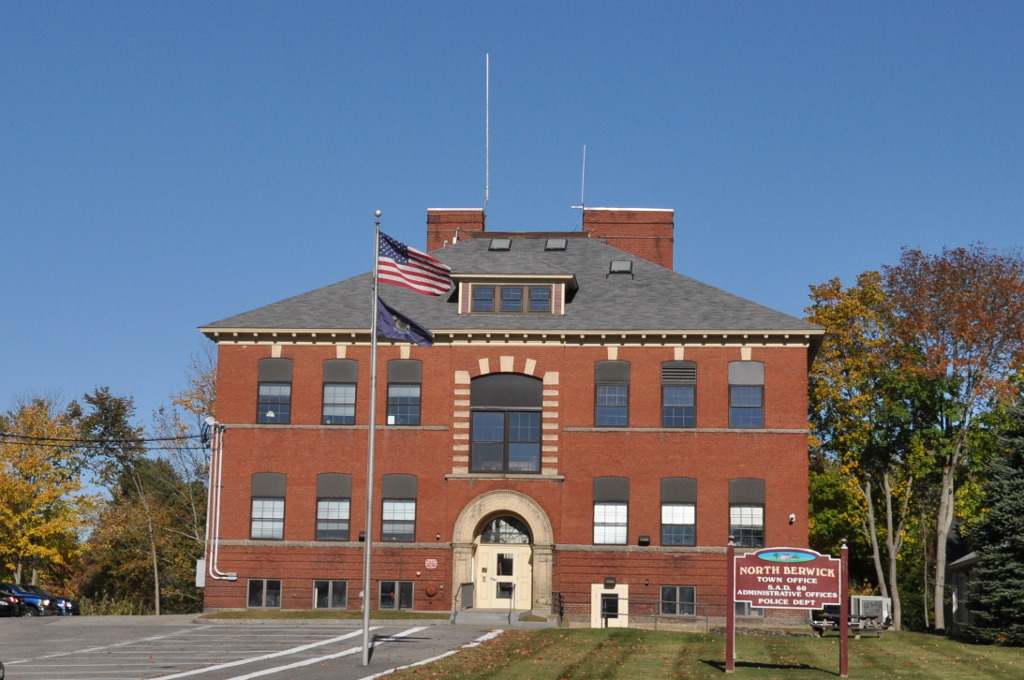
High School, North Berwick, 1902

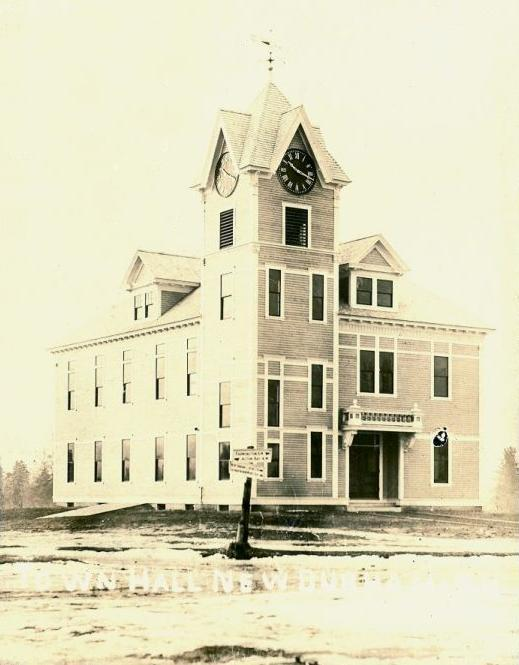
Town Hall, New Durham, 1908
