= Baxter Lake (New Hampshire) =

Lake in Strafford County, New Hampshire

- Location within New Hampshire Location within the United States
- Location: Strafford County, New Hampshire
- Coordinates: 43°19′39″N 71°02′36″W
- Primary outflows: Rickers Brook
- Basin countries: United States
- Max. length: 1.1 mi (1.8 km)
- Max. width: 0.8 mi (1.3 km)
- Surface area: 302 acres (1.22 km^{2})
- Average depth: 7 ft (2.1 m)
- Max. depth: 16 ft (4.9 m)
- Surface elevation: 414 ft (126 m)
- Settlements: Farmington; Rochester

Baxter Lake is a 302.1-acre (1.223 km^{2}) water body located in Strafford County in eastern New Hampshire, United States, in the town of Farmington and the city of Rochester. It is part of the Cocheco River watershed, a tributary of the Piscataqua River.

Lake access is from the state launching ramp off Four Rod Road. Once clear of the island, winds are very steady for small boat sailing. Much of the east shoreline is undeveloped.

The lake is classified as a warmwater fishery, with observed species including smallmouth bass, largemouth bass, chain pickerel, and horned pout.

== See also ==
- List of lakes in New Hampshire
