= New Durham Meetinghouse and Pound =

Historic church in New Hampshire, United States

- U.S. National Register of Historic Places
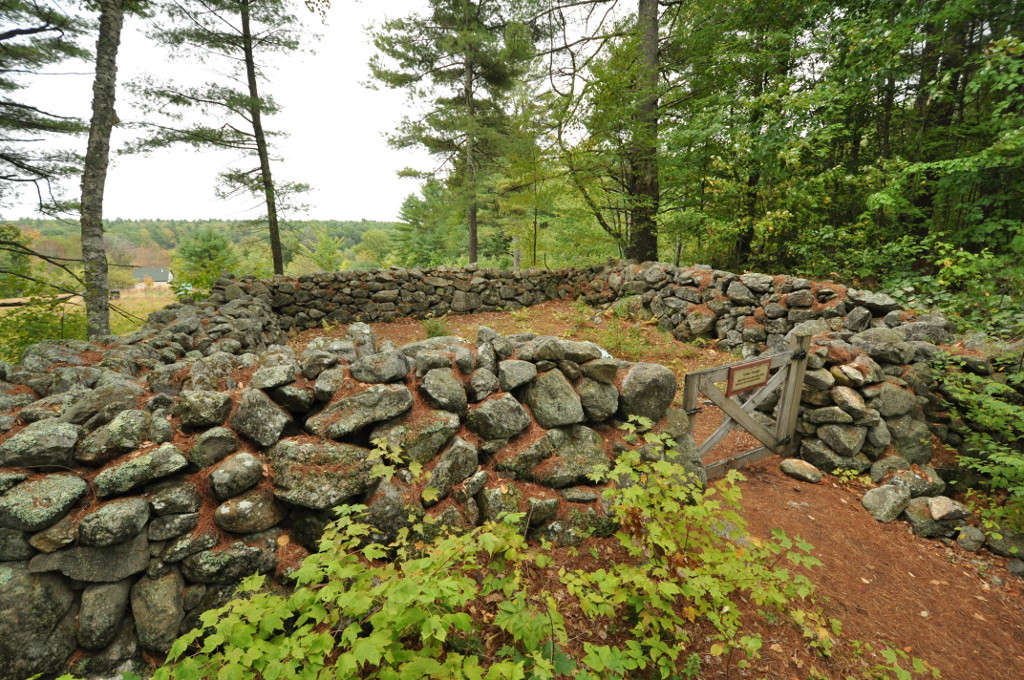
- The animal pound

- Location within New Hampshire Location within the United States
- Location: Old Bay Rd., New Durham, New Hampshire
- Coordinates: 43°25′25″N 71°7′42″W
- Area: less than one acre
- Built: 1770
- NRHP reference No.: 80000312
- Added to NRHP: December 08, 1980

The New Durham Meetinghouse and Pound are a historic colonial meeting house and town pound on Old Bay Road in New Durham, New Hampshire. Built in 1770, the wood-frame meeting house stands at what was, until about 1850, the center of New Durham, and was originally used for both civic and religious purposes. Now a public park, the property was listed on the National Register of Historic Places in 1980.

== Description and history ==
The old New Durham Meetinghouse stands in central southern New Durham, on the south side of Old Bay Road just northwest of its junction with Davis Crossing Road. It is a single-story wood-frame structure, with a gabled roof and clapboarded exterior. It is very simply styled, with plain corner boards and window surrounds. The main facade has a center entrance, also with simple framing, flanked by sash windows. Side elevations have four windows each. The interior retains only modest elements of its original appearance. Also on the property are the town's first burial ground, and a rectangular stone animal pound.

The town of New Durham was chartered in 1762, its settlers formally obligated to build a meeting house by 1768. This structure was erected in 1770 to satisfy the requirement. It was originally built as a two-story structure, but after the church congregation moved to its own building, the town voted to reduce it to a single story in 1838. It served as the town's principal civic meeting space until the construction of the New Durham Town Hall in 1908. It was sold, along with the 1809 animal pound, to a local farmer, who used the building for storage. It was given back to the town by his heirs in 1979. The building was reported to be structurally unsound in 2014, but funding had been secured to stabilize it.

== See also ==
- National Register of Historic Places listings in Strafford County, New Hampshire
- New Hampshire Historical Marker No. 222: New Durham Meetinghouse
