= Ela River =

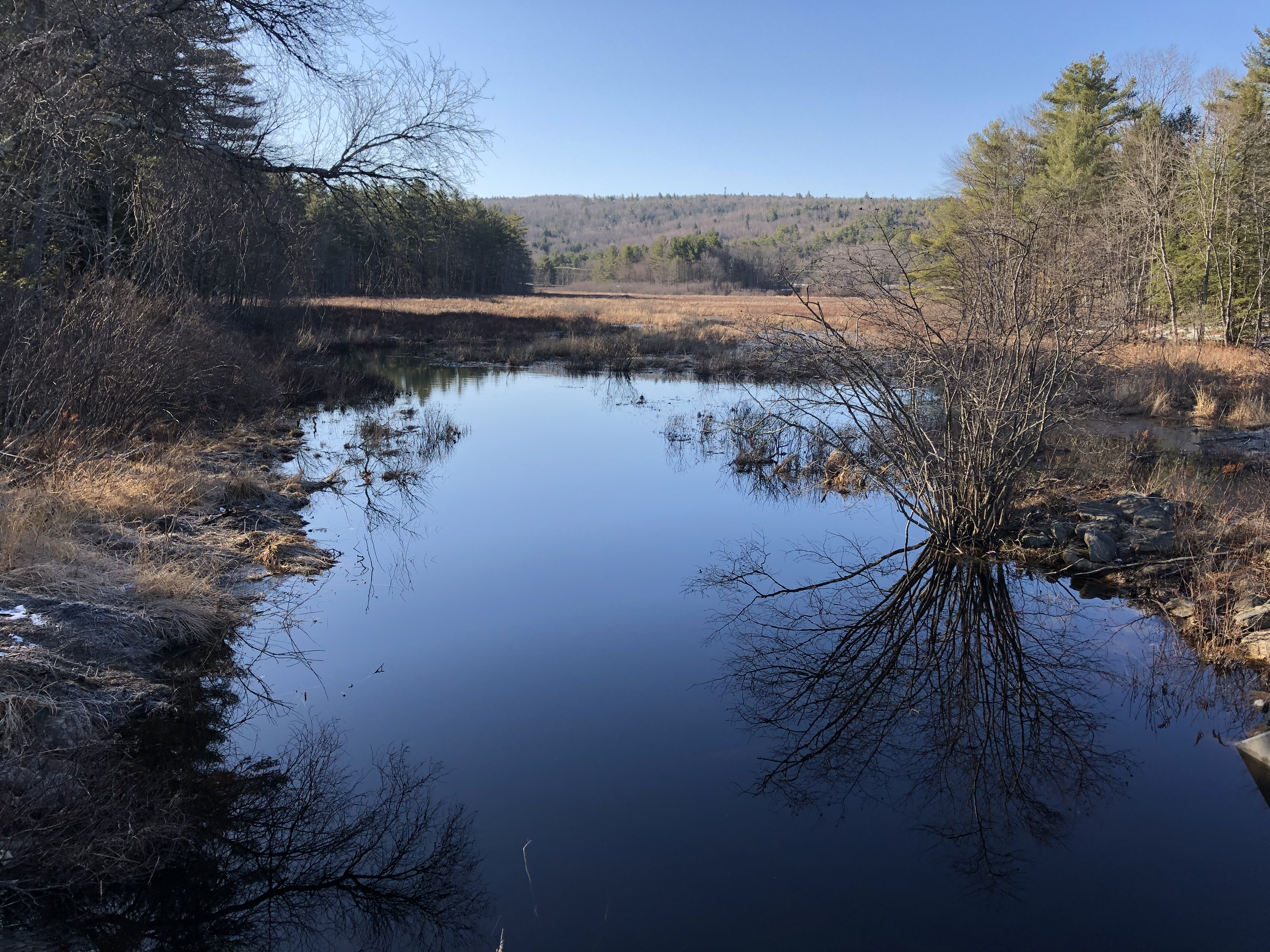
- Wetland on the Ela River in New Durham, NH

- Location within New Hampshire Location within the United States

Location
- Country: United States
- State: New Hampshire
- County: Strafford
- Towns: New Durham, Farmington

Physical characteristics
- Source: Coldrain Pond
  - location: New Durham
  - coordinates: 43°27′3″N 71°8′34″W
  - elevation: 668 ft (204 m)
- Mouth: Cochecho River
  - location: Farmington
  - coordinates: 43°23′20″N 71°4′12″W
  - elevation: 278 ft (85 m)
- Length: 10.6 mi (17.1 km)

The Ela River is a 10.6-mile-long (17.1 km) river in eastern New Hampshire in the United States. It is a tributary of the Cochecho River, part of the Piscataqua River watershed leading to the Atlantic Ocean.

The river begins at Coldrain Pond in New Durham, New Hampshire, 4 miles (6 km) east of Lake Winnipesaukee. Flowing south through Club Pond, the river turns southeast and descends to Farmington, where it joins the Cochecho. New Hampshire Route 11 parallels the river for most of its southeasterly course.

== See also ==
- List of rivers of New Hampshire
