= Mad River (Cocheco River tributary) =

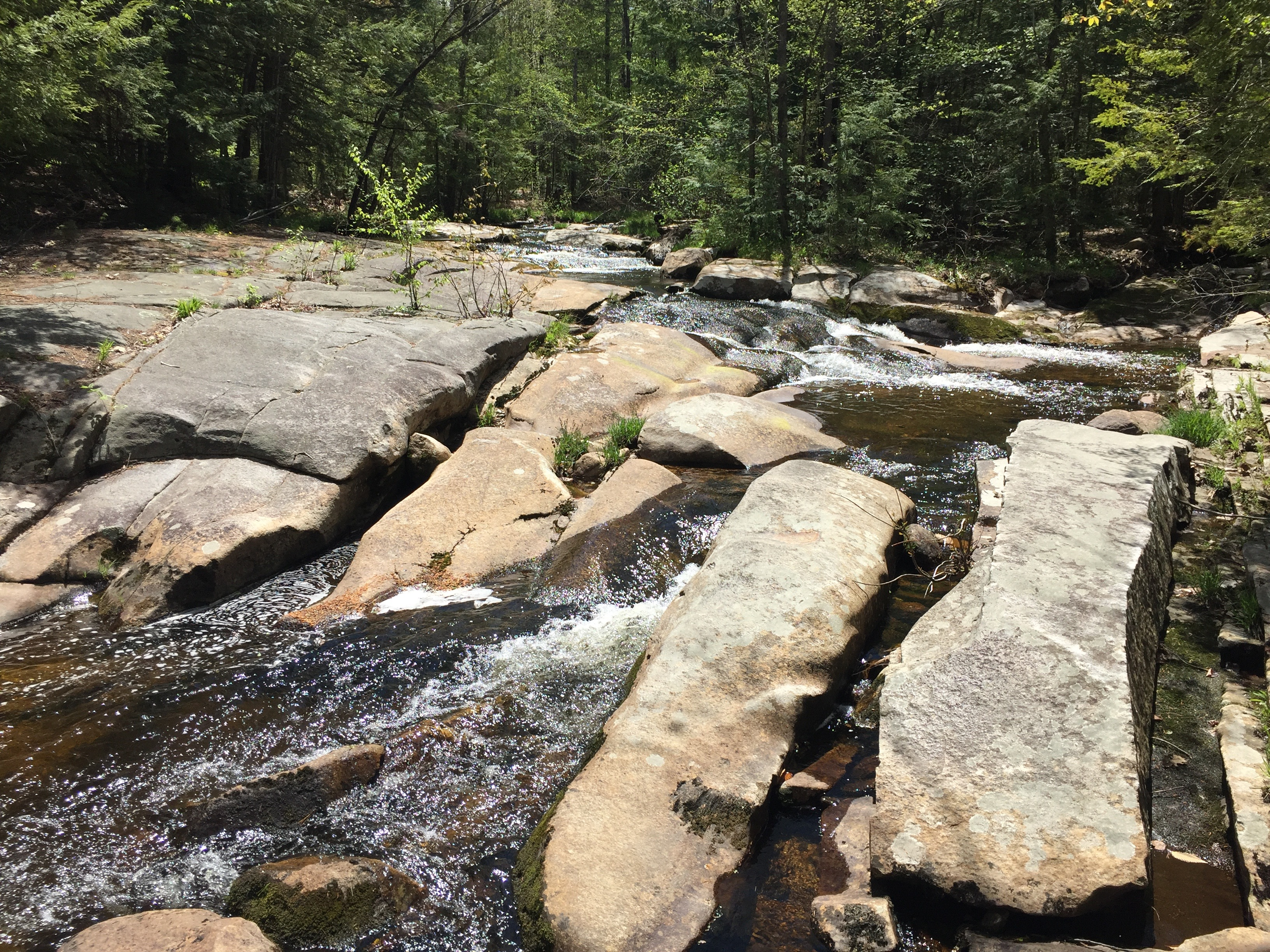
- Ledges near River Road in Farmington, NH

- Location within New Hampshire Location within the United States

Location
- Country: United States
- State: New Hampshire
- County: Strafford
- Town: Farmington

Physical characteristics
- Source: Nubble Pond
  - location: Farmington
  - coordinates: 43°21′4″N 71°6′1″W
  - elevation: 715 ft (218 m)
- Mouth: Cochecho River
  - location: Farmington village
  - coordinates: 43°23′11″N 71°4′2″W
  - elevation: 270 ft (82 m)
- Length: 5.2 mi (8.4 km)

The Mad River is a 5.2-mile-long (8.4 km) river in eastern New Hampshire in the United States. It is a tributary of the Cochecho River, part of the Piscataqua River watershed leading to the Atlantic Ocean.

The river is located entirely in the town of Farmington. It rises in Nubble Pond, between Nubble Mountain and Hussey Mountain, and flows northwest, then northeast, reaching the Cochecho near the town center of Farmington. The river drops more than 500 feet (150 m) over its 5-mile (8 km) route, in places falling over scenic ledges.

== See also ==
- List of rivers of New Hampshire
