= Merrymeeting Lake =

Lake in New Hampshire, United States

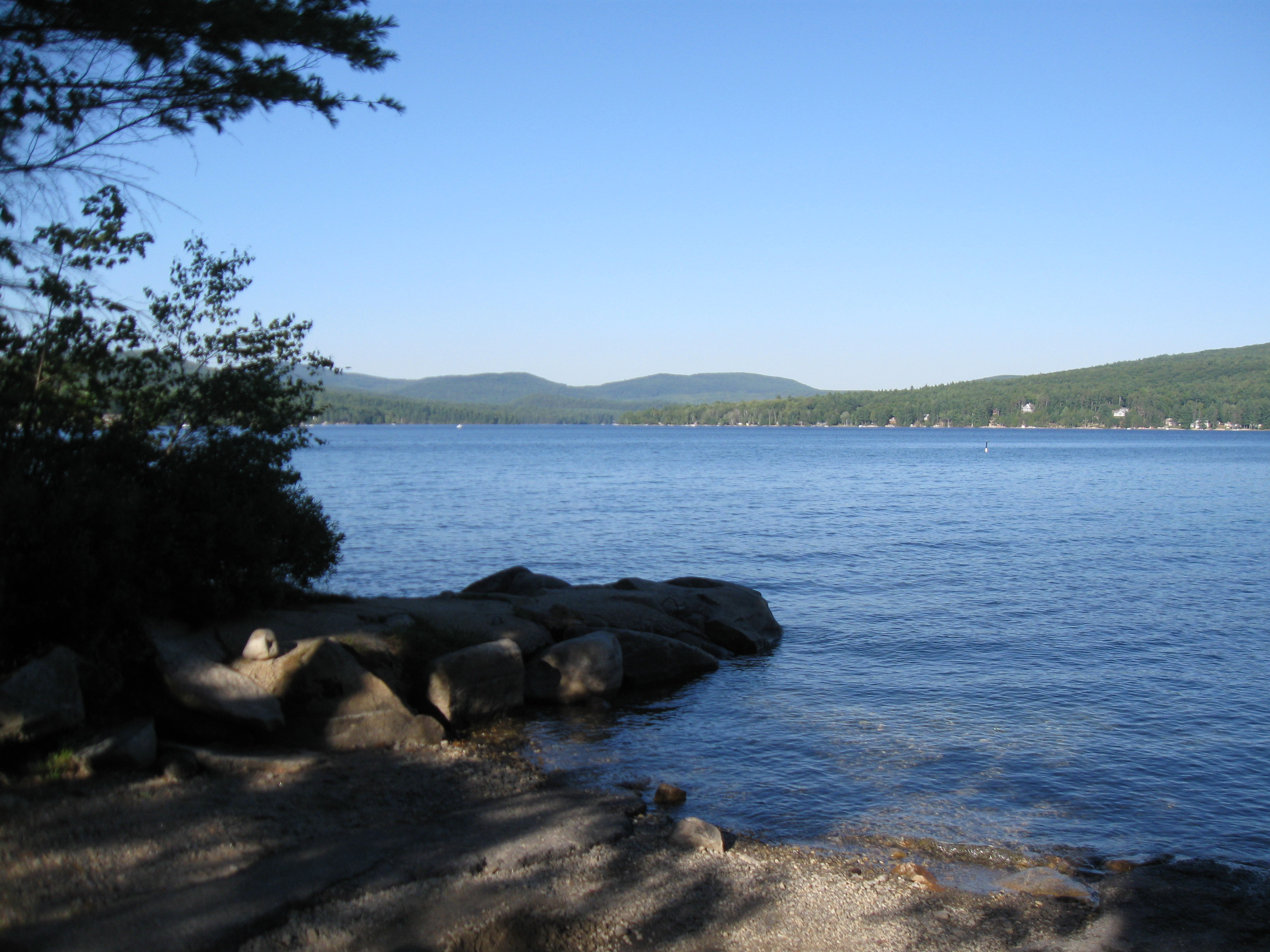

- Location within New Hampshire Location within the United States
- Location: Strafford County, New Hampshire
- Coordinates: 43°29′25″N 71°9′19″W
- Primary outflows: Merrymeeting River
- Basin countries: United States
- Max. length: 3.1 mi (5.0 km)
- Max. width: 1.3 mi (2.1 km)
- Surface area: 1,233 acres (4.99 km^{2})
- Average depth: 29 ft (8.8 m)
- Max. depth: 120 ft (37 m)
- Surface elevation: 647 ft (197 m)
- Settlements: New Durham

Merrymeeting Lake is a 1,233-acre (4.99 km^{2}) water body located in Strafford County in eastern New Hampshire, United States, in the town of New Durham. Its outlet is the Merrymeeting River, flowing south and then northwest to Lake Winnipesaukee.

The shores of Merrymeeting Lake are moderately to heavily developed. The lake has a busy recreational character rather than a wilderness character. Only a few small segments of shoreline remain undeveloped. The undeveloped areas are the western side of Sawtooth Cove, because the land is extremely steep there and difficult to build on, and the far eastern shore of the lake which is not easily accessible by road.

In the 1980s, most buildings along the lake were simple summer camps. During the 1990s, most of these structures were replaced by higher end summer homes, some worth millions of dollars. The town of New Durham maintains two paved roads, North Shore Road and South Shore Road, which almost encircle the lake, allowing for year-round residence. However, the winter population is small. Most properties on the lake are second homes for affluent families.

There is a dam at the west end of the lake, which is used to control the lake's water level. Each year in the fall the water level in the lake is lowered via the dam. Water level is restored to its normal level in the spring by snow melt and rainfall. The Powder Mill Fish Hatchery is located at the base of the dam, and is fed by the overflow of the lake's water.

Merrymeeting Lake has common loons which nest on the western shore. Ducks also live on the lake, although feeding them is discouraged by the Merrymeeting Lake Association. The New Hampshire Fish and Game Department stocks the lake for recreational fishing. The lake is classified as a cold- and warmwater fishery, with observed species including rainbow trout, landlocked salmon, lake trout, smallmouth bass, chain pickerel, and horned pout.

== See also ==
- List of lakes in New Hampshire
