= Merrymeeting River =

River in New Hampshire, USA

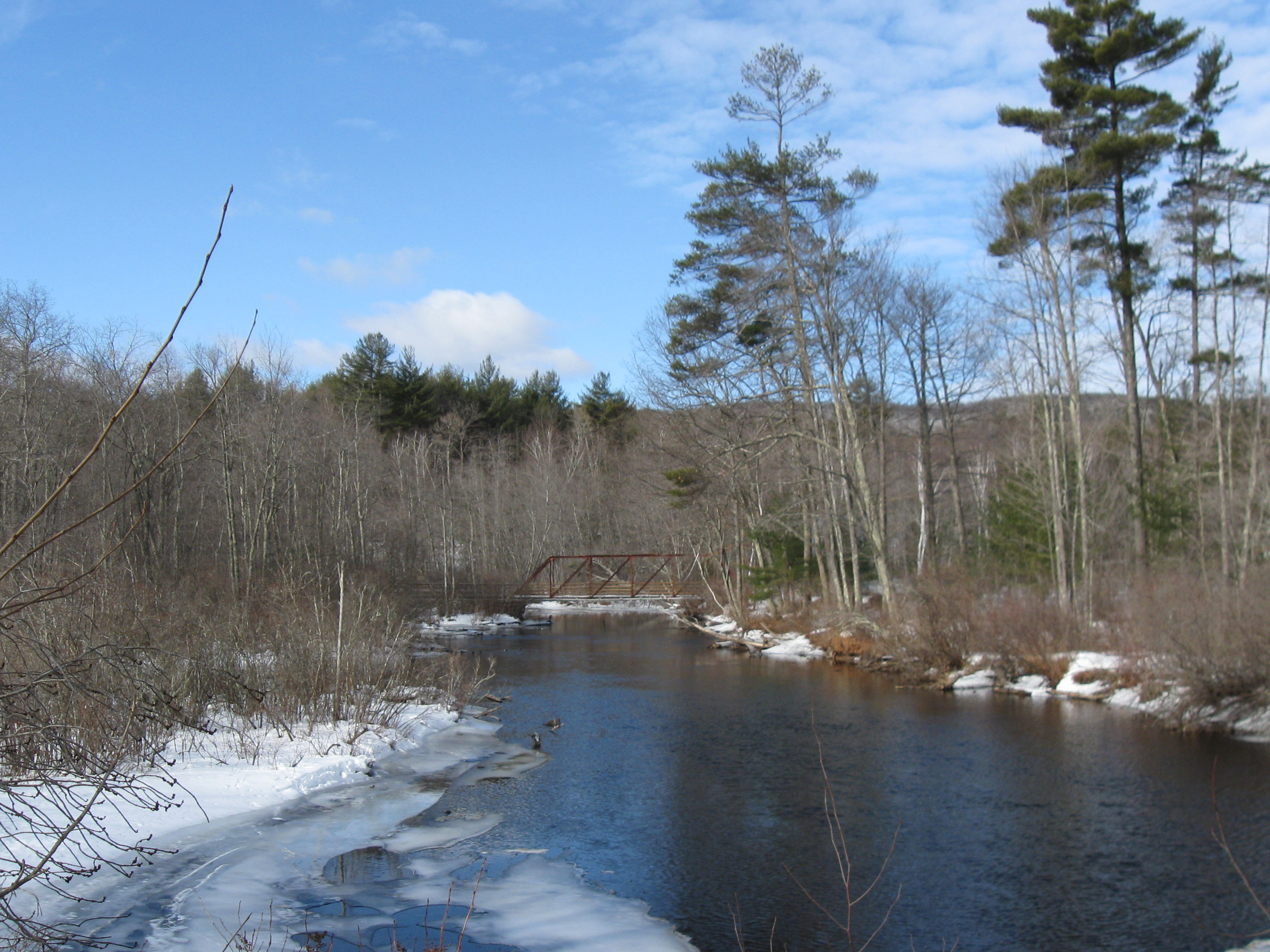
- The Merrymeeting River in Alton, New Hampshire

- Location within New Hampshire Location within the United States

Location
- Country: United States
- State: New Hampshire
- Counties: Strafford, Belknap
- Towns: New Durham, Alton

Physical characteristics
- Source: Merrymeeting Lake
  - location: New Durham
  - coordinates: 43°28′38″N 71°10′44″W
  - elevation: 647 ft (197 m)
- Mouth: Lake Winnipesaukee
  - location: Alton Bay
  - coordinates: 43°28′12″N 71°14′2″W
  - elevation: 504 ft (154 m)
- Length: 10.0 mi (16.1 km)

Basin features
- Tributaries
  - left: Coffin Brook

The Merrymeeting River is a 10.0-mile-long (16.1 km) river in the Lakes Region of central New Hampshire in the United States. It is a tributary of Lake Winnipesaukee, part of the Merrimack River watershed.

The river begins at the outlet of Merrymeeting Lake in the town of New Durham. The river flows south through a chain of ponds to the village proper of New Durham. After passing under New Hampshire Route 11, the river enters Merrymeeting Marsh and turns sharply to the northwest, the course it will take the rest of the way to its end. The river crosses a small dam at Alton and reaches Lake Winnipesaukee at the community of Alton Bay, the southernmost point on the lake.

== See also ==
- List of rivers of New Hampshire
