= Rattlesnake River =

- Location within New Hampshire Location within the United States

Location
- Country: United States
- State: New Hampshire
- County: Strafford
- Towns: Farmington

Physical characteristics
- Source
  - location: Farmington
  - coordinates: 43°21′25″N 71°4′50″W
  - elevation: 710 ft (220 m)
- Mouth: Cocheco River
  - location: Farmington
  - coordinates: 43°21′59″N 71°2′10″W
  - elevation: 238 ft (73 m)
- Length: 3.6 mi (5.8 km)

The Rattlesnake River is a 3.6-mile-long (5.8 km) river in eastern New Hampshire in the United States. It is a tributary of the Cocheco River, part of the Piscataqua River watershed leading to the Atlantic Ocean.

The river is located entirely in the town of Farmington. It rises north of Hussey Mountain and Chesley Mountain and flows east to the Cocheco, dropping nearly 500 feet (150 m) in elevation over its length.

== See also ==
- List of rivers of New Hampshire
