= Harry Bemis =

American baseball player (1874-1947)

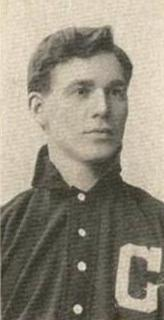
- Catcher
- Born: February 1, 1874; Farmington, New Hampshire, U.S.
- Died: May 23, 1947 (aged 73); Cleveland, Ohio, U.S.
- Batted: Right Threw: Right

MLB debut
- April 23, 1902, for the Cleveland Naps

Last MLB appearance
- August 15, 1910, for the Cleveland Naps

MLB statistics
- Batting average: .255
- Home runs: 5
- Runs batted in: 234
- Stats at Baseball Reference

Teams
- Cleveland Naps (1902–1910)

Harry Parker Bemis (February 1, 1874 – May 23, 1947) was an American catcher in Major League Baseball. Nicknamed "Handsome Harry," he played with the Cleveland Naps from 1902 to 1910. He batted right and threw right. In his nine-year career, he batted .255, with five home runs, 569 hits, 234 runs batted in, 214 runs scored, and 49 stolen bases. He stood at 5'6" and weighed 155 pounds.

== Biography ==
Born in Farmington, New Hampshire, Bemis started his professional baseball career in 1899 in the Eastern League. He played three years for the Toronto Royals. In 1901, he hit .307 and was acquired by the American League's Cleveland Naps. He made his major league debut in 1902. That season, he hit a career-high .312 and led all AL catchers in assists and caught stealings. Bemis was Cleveland's primary catcher for the rest of the decade. In 1903, he led the league's catchers in fielding percentage. His batting average went down to .226 in 1904, but he improved the next two seasons to .292 and .276 with OPS+ totals of over 100.

In June 1907, Bemis was run over at home plate by Ty Cobb. The Tigers' star was trying for an inside-the-park home run and knocked Bemis down, jarring the ball loose in the process. Bemis then picked the ball up and beat Cobb over the head with it before he was restrained by the umpire; Bemis was also ejected from the game. Cobb later claimed that Bemis was one of only two intentional spiking targets in his entire career.

In 1908, Bemis hit just .224, and his playing time declined. He continued to hit poorly in the following seasons; in 1911, he went down to the minor leagues with the American Association's Columbus Senators. He also played in the International League, Southern Association, and New York State League. He retired after the 1915 season, when he was 41 years old.

After his baseball career ended, Bemis worked for a furniture company. He died at his home in Cleveland, Ohio in 1947 and was buried in the Elmhurst Park Cemetery.
