= Paul Palmer (minister) =

New England General Baptist minister (??–1747)

Paul Palmer (died 1747) was a New England English-born General Baptist minister, founder of the Free Will Baptist movement with Benjamin Randall. He arrived from England and established several early Baptist churches in Province of North Carolina, including the first known Baptist church in the state. His home church was Delaware's Welsh Tract Baptist Church, which is a Calvinist Baptist church.

== Life ==
Palmer's wife Joanna was the stepdaughter of Benjamin Laker, who emigrated to the Carolinas in the 1680s from England, an associate of Thomas Grantham and signer of the 1663 edition of the Standard Confession of Faith. According to Elder John T. Albritton:

[Palmer] was said to have been a native of Maryland, was baptized in Delaware, and ordained in Connecticut. He was some time in New Jersey, and removed thence to Maryland, and thence to Perquimans County, NC. He belonged to the General Baptists, and was actively engaged in the work of the ministry for many years in this State, traveling over a large portion of Eastern Carolina, winning converts wherever he went.

While in Maryland, Palmer served the First Baptist Church in Baltimore County. Around 1727, Palmer founded North Carolina's first Baptist church at Perquimans (present day Shiloh) in Camden County. Palmer and his wife Joanna were indicted by the North Carolina provincial courts for their ministry. It is generally accepted that Palmer died in 1747.
