= New Durham Town Hall =

- U.S. National Register of Historic Places
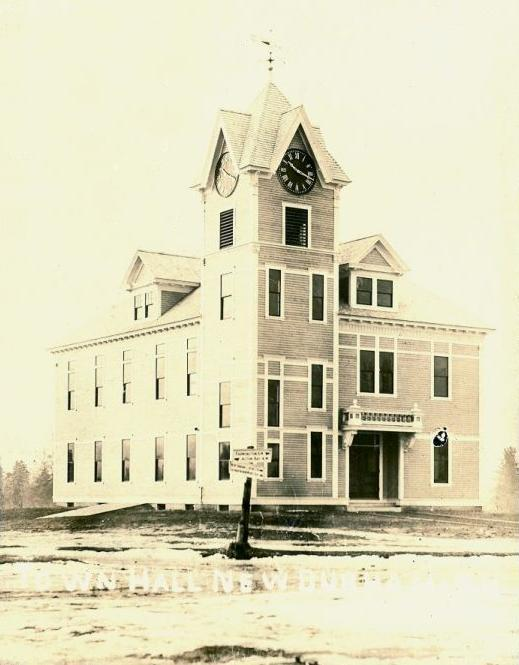
- Town Hall in 1908

- Location within New Hampshire Location within the United States
- Location: Main St. and Ridge Rd., New Durham, New Hampshire
- Coordinates: 43°26′2″N 71°9′55″W
- Area: less than one acre
- Built: 1908
- Architect: Alvah T. Ramsdell
- Architectural style: Colonial Revival, Italianate
- NRHP reference No.: 80000313
- Added to NRHP: November 13, 1980

The New Durham Town Hall is located at Main Street and Ridge Road in the center of New Durham, New Hampshire. Built in 1908, it is the town's second town hall, and an architecturally distinctive design of Dover architect Alvah T. Ramsdell. It was listed on the National Register of Historic Places in 1980.

== Description and history ==
New Durham's town hall is prominently located in its village center, at the northwest corner of Main Street and Ridge Road. It is a 2 1/2-story wood-frame structure, with a hip roof and clapboarded exterior. It is a stylistically distinctive combination of Colonial Revival and Italianate design, with an elaborately decorated hood sheltering the recessed entry. The northeast corner of the building is taken up by a 55-foot (17 m) tower, which has corner pilasters rising to the third stage, and a hipped roof topped by a weathervane. The interior houses town offices on the ground floor, and an auditorium and meeting space on the upper level.

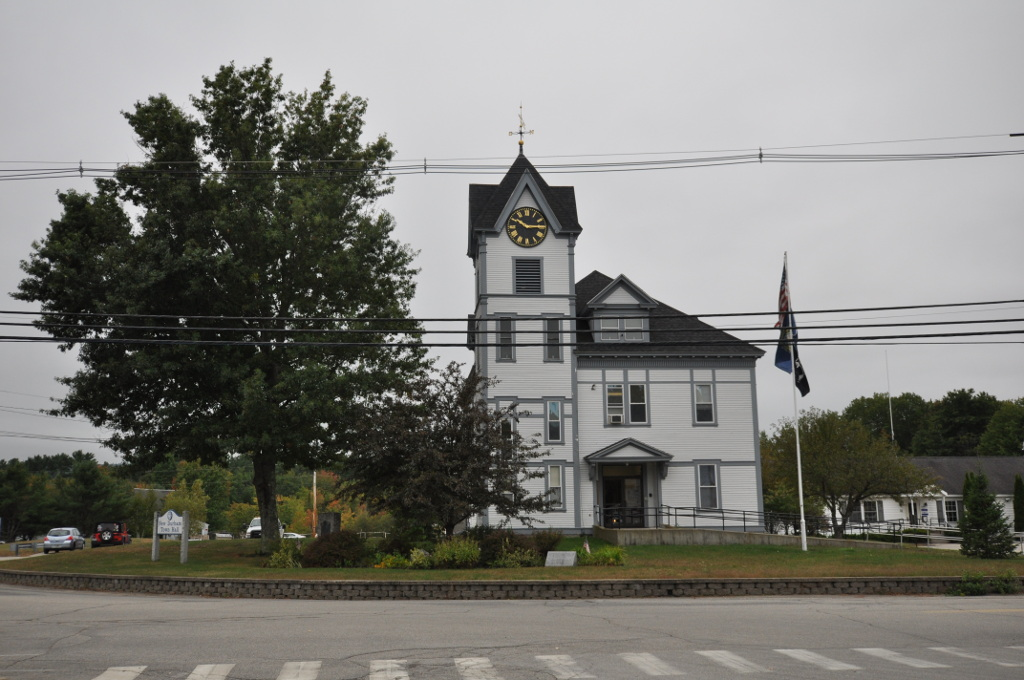
2016 photo

The town hall was built in 1908, replacing in function the town's original 1770 meetinghouse, which still stands in the rural New Durham Corner area to the south. The new location of the town's civic heart was occasioned by changes in the town's economic focus due to the construction of new roads, and arrival in the 1850s of the railroad. In addition to serving its civic function, the upstairs hall is also a social center, housing meetings and events of community groups. Alvah Ramsdell, the architect, was prominent in the region, designing a number of similar town halls, as well as schools and commercial buildings.

== See also ==
- National Register of Historic Places listings in Strafford County, New Hampshire
