= Welch College =

Private four-year college in Gallatin, Tennessee

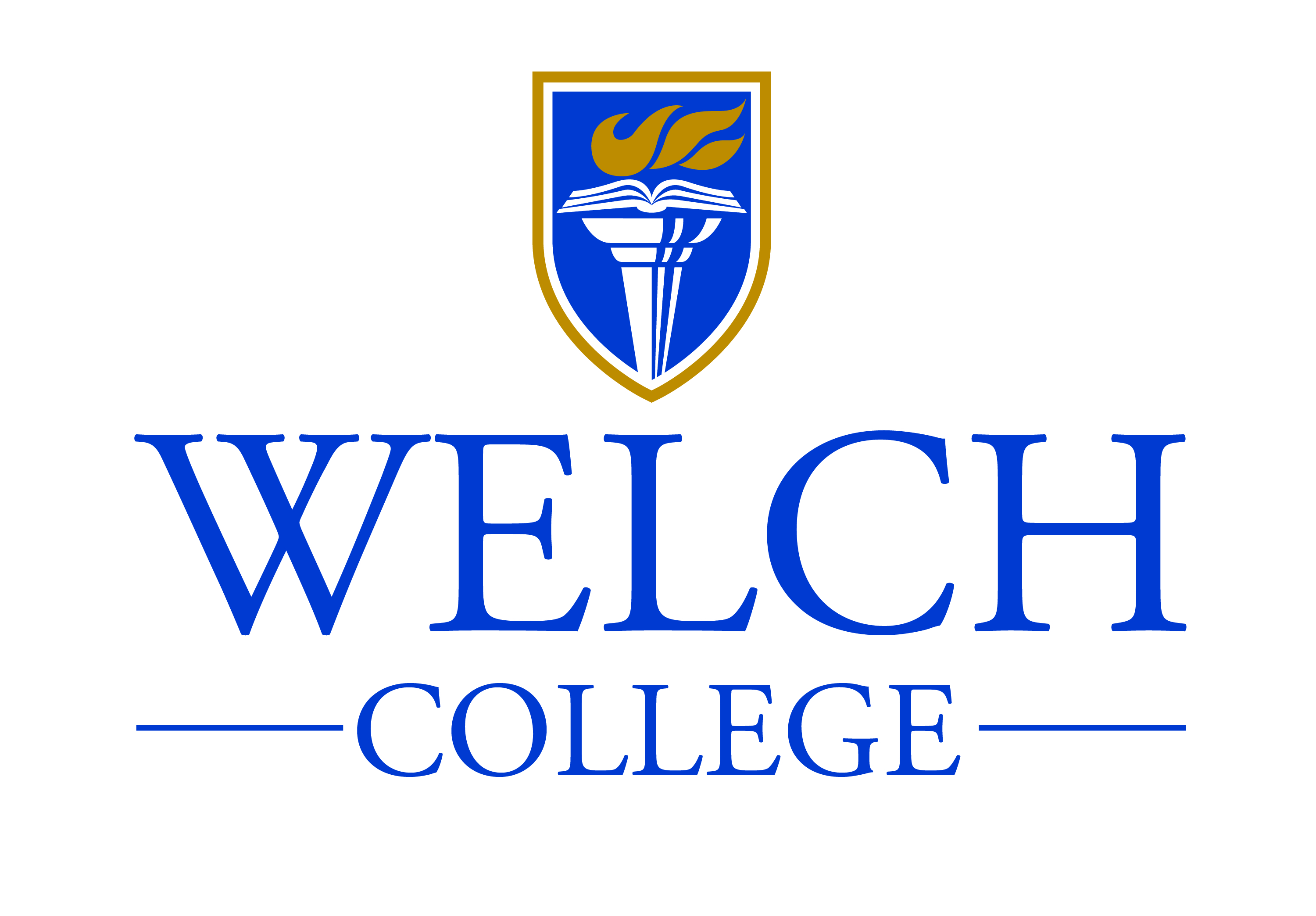
- Former names: Free Will Baptist Bible College
- Motto: O Send out Thy Light and Thy Truth
- Type: Private college
- Established: 1942
- Accreditation: SACS-COC
- Affiliations: National Association of Free Will Baptists
- Religious affiliation: Free Will Baptist
- Academic affiliations: ABHE
- Endowment: $4.6 million (2024)
- President: J. Matthew Pinson
- Provost: Matthew McAffee
- Undergraduates: 394 (fall 2022)
- Location: Gallatin, Tennessee, United States; 36.367753°N 86.549267°W
- Campus: Urban
- Colors: Blue, white & gold
- Nickname: Flames
- Sporting affiliations: NCCAA
- Website: www.welch.edu

Welch College, formerly the Free Will Baptist Bible College, is a private Free Will Baptist college in Gallatin, Tennessee. Founded in 1942, it is one of several higher learning institutions associated with the National Association of Free Will Baptists. Welch College offers 50 majors, including theological studies, premed/nursing, business, teacher education and music.

== History ==
The National Association of Free Will Baptists in general session in Nashville, Tennessee, called for the creation of Free Will Baptist Bible College and its doors opened in 1942 as a two-year institution. Linton C. Johnson was its first President. Eight students composed the original student body. The college added a third year of study in 1949, a fourth year in 1950 and awarded its first Bachelor's degrees to five students in 1951.

In August 2008 the college purchased a 66-acre (270,000 m^{2}) tract in Gallatin, Tennessee, to become the site of a larger campus. The college sold its West End Avenue campus and as of March 2017 is completing the new campus on the Gallatin site.

In July 2012 at the National Association of Free Will Baptists in Memphis, the denomination voted to change the name of the college to Welch College. It was renamed for John L. Welch and his wife Mary; Welch was a prominent figure in the merger of Free Will Baptist bodies into the NAFWB denomination.

=== Controversies ===
In August 2019, the college briefly attracted national attention when administrators suspended a transgender student, attributing the action to a conflict in student policy. The student had undergone a double mastectomy as part of the transition process days prior to the suspension.

== Academics ==
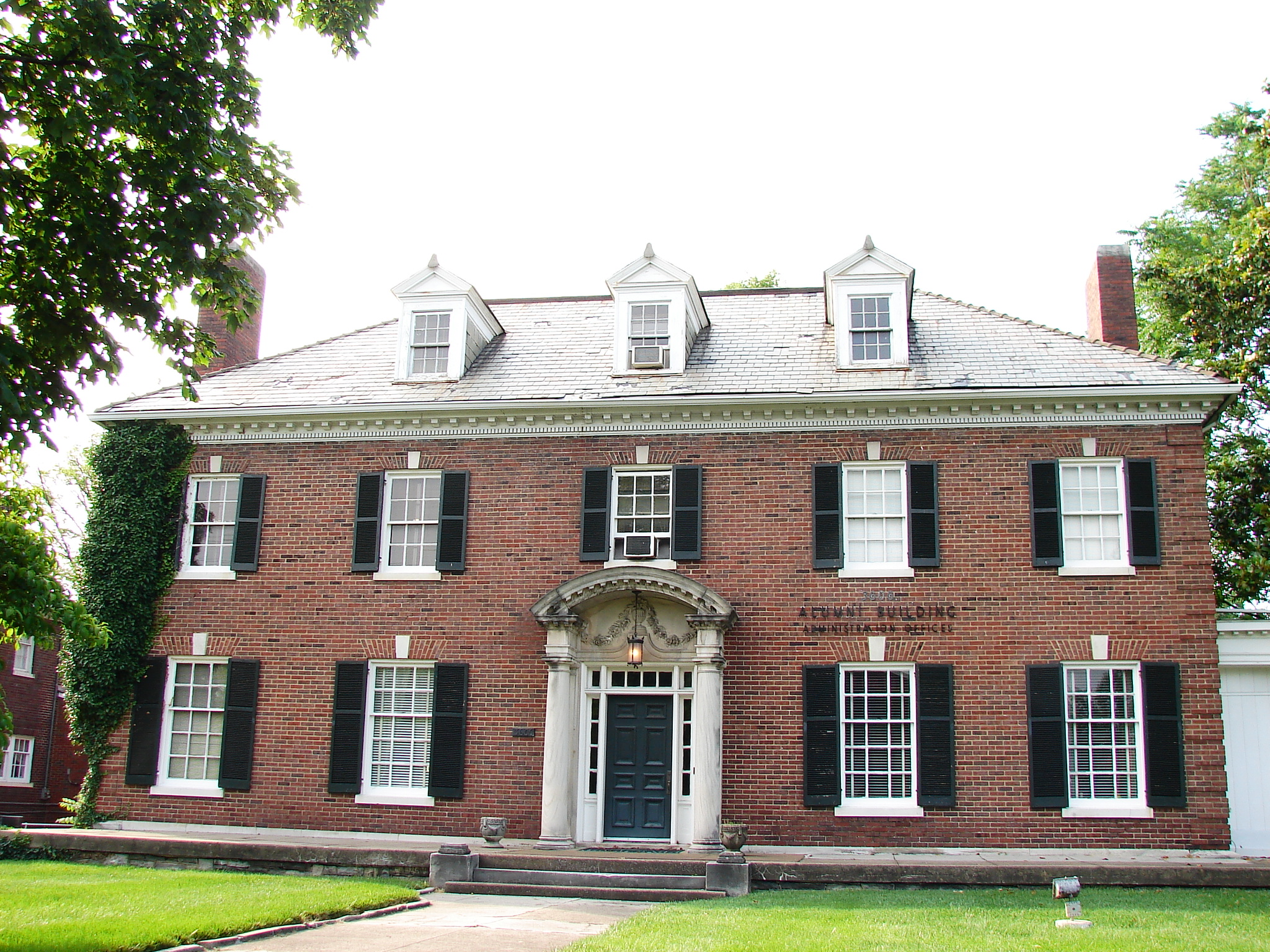
Administration building at the old Welch College campus

The college offers Bachelor of Arts, Bachelor of Science, and Bachelor of Music Education degree programs. Associate degree programs are also offered as well as the Master of Arts and Master of Divinity.

== Athletics ==
The athletic teams of Welch College are called the "Flames" and compete in the National Christian College Athletic Association (NCCAA). Currently there are five varsity teams.

=== Men's sports ===
- Basketball
- Golf
- Cross Country
- Soccer (Fall 2018)

=== Women's sports ===
- Basketball
- Volleyball
- Golf
- Cross Country
- Soccer (Fall 2018)
