= Lawrence Lee Pelletier =

Lawrence Lee Pelletier (8 September 1914 – 10 August 1995) was the 16th president of Allegheny College in Meadville, Pennsylvania. His tenure in that post was the second longest in the College's history.

== Life and education ==
Pelletier was born in Farmington, New Hampshire, and grew up in Sanford, Maine. He graduated cum laude and Phi Beta Kappa from Bowdoin College in 1936. He received an MA (1939) and a PhD degree (1947) from Harvard University.

== Career ==
Following his graduation from Harvard in 1939, Pelletier began teaching (History and Government) at the University of Maine at Orono. He remained there until 1945, then returned to Harvard for his PhD.

In 1946 he returned to Bowdoin to teach government. During the 1940s he served as consultant to the National Resources Planning Board, and the Maine Municipal Association. He published several studies on financing state and local government, the initiative and referendum in Maine, and the town manager plan. In 1950 he was executive secretary to Maine Governor Frederick G. Payne, and sat on a committee that modernized the state’s tax structure. From 1953 to 1954 he was associate director of the Citizenship Clearing House of the New York University School of Law.

Chief Justice of the New Jersey Supreme Court Arthur T. Vanderbilt led a search committee to replace the President of Allegheny College. Vanderbilt was aware of Pelletier's contributions, and recommended him. Pelletier was installed in the post in 1955, and served until 1980, when declining health convinced him to retire. He and his wife moved to York Harbor, Maine, where he lived until his death (from cancer) in 1995.

== Honors and recognitions ==
During Pelletier's tenure as president, enrollment at Allegheny College increased from approximately 1,000 to 1,850 and the size of the faculty increased from 78 to 130. Additionally, from 1959 to 1980 the college raised $1 million on average for capital purposes and its budget exceeded $13 million by 1980. Several buildings were built during his tenure, including a library (1976) that carries his name.

Pelletier served as trustee for the Middle States Association of Colleges and Secondary Schools. He served on the convention that proposed changes to the constitution of the Commonwealth of Pennsylvania (1968). He received honorary doctor of laws degrees from Bowdoin (1962), Colby College (1963), Gannon College (1975), Gannon University (1975), and Nasson College (1980).

Pelletier led the effort to acquire the college's first mainstream computer (an IBM 1640), making it among the first colleges to do so (1962).
