= Wakefield Town Hall and Opera House =

- U.S. National Register of Historic Places
- NH State Register of Historic Places
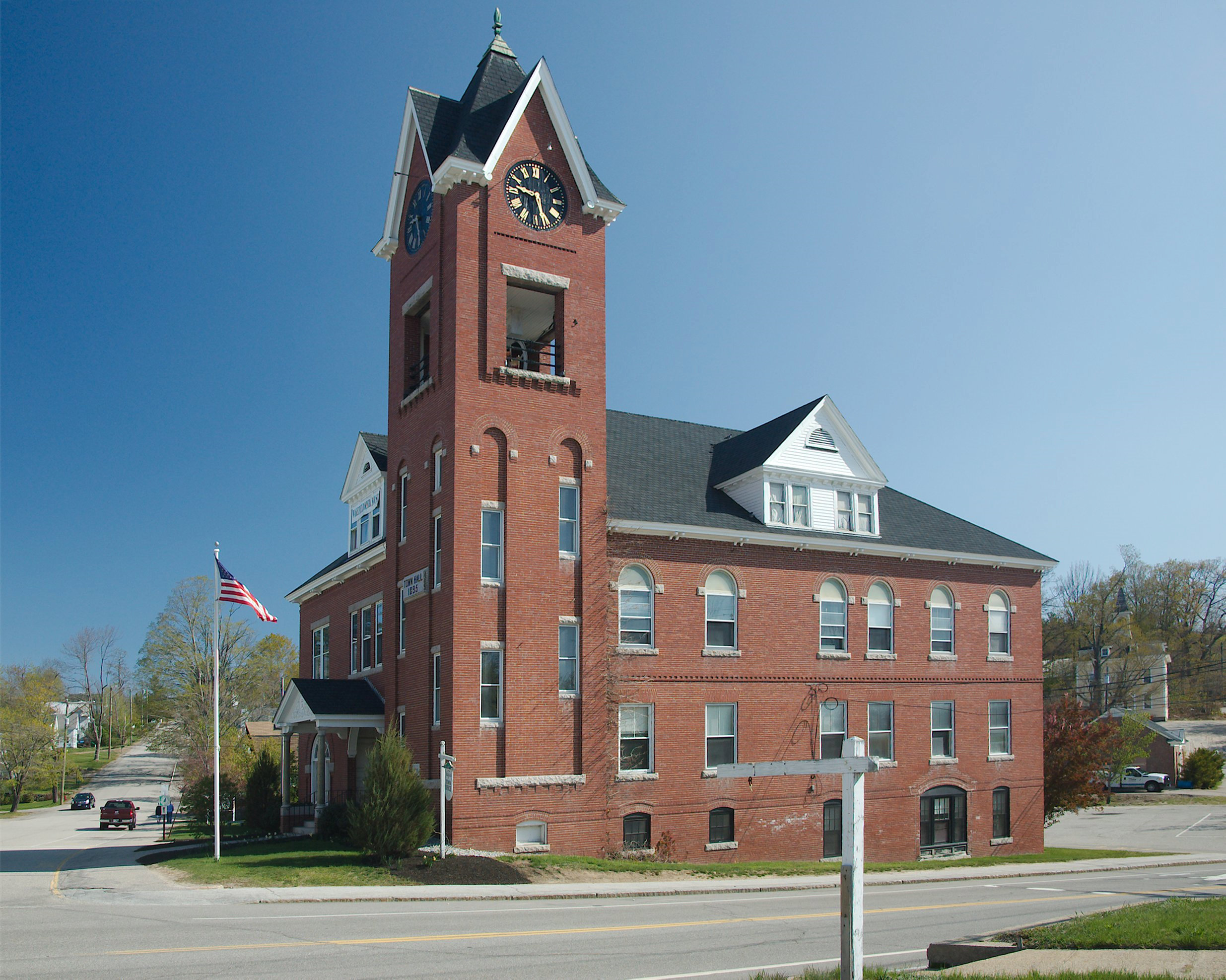

- Location within New Hampshire Location within the United States
- Location: 2 High St., Wakefield, New Hampshire
- Coordinates: 43°33′14″N 71°1′50″W
- Area: 0.2 acres (0.081 ha)
- Built: 1895
- Architect: Alvah T. Ramsdell
- Architectural style: Romanesque
- NRHP reference No.: 07000550

Significant dates
- Added to NRHP: June 12, 2007
- Designated NHSRHP: July 29, 2002

The Wakefield Town Hall and Opera House is a historic municipal building at 2 High Street in the Sanbornville village of Wakefield, New Hampshire. Built in 1895, it is a prominent local example of Romanesque architecture, and has housed civic and social activities since its construction. The building was listed on the National Register of Historic Places in 2007, and the New Hampshire State Register of Historic Places in 2002.

== Description and history ==
The Wakefield Town Hall and Opera House is prominently located in the center of Sanbornville, at the northeast corner of High Street and Meadow Street (New Hampshire Route 109). It is a two-story masonry structure, built out of brick with granite trim. It is covered by a hip roof pierced by single wide gable dormers on its street-facing facades. At the street corner, a three-story square tower rises 75 feet (23 m) to a pyramidal roof; its upper stages house an open belfry and clock, while its lower sections have windows set in slightly recessed round-arch panels.

The building was designed by Alvah T. Ramsdell and built in 1895, replacing an older town hall (which still stands) in Wakefield Village. The Romanesque building functions primarily as the seat of the local government, but also has a large performance space on the upper floor which is used for theatrical, musical, and social functions. Spaces in the ground floor were also originally used for other purposes, including retail, banking, and post office functions. They have since been taken over to town offices.

== See also ==
- National Register of Historic Places listings in Carroll County, New Hampshire
