= Welsh Tract Baptist Church =

Historic church in Delaware, US

- Welsh Tract Old School Baptist Church
- U.S. National Register of Historic Places
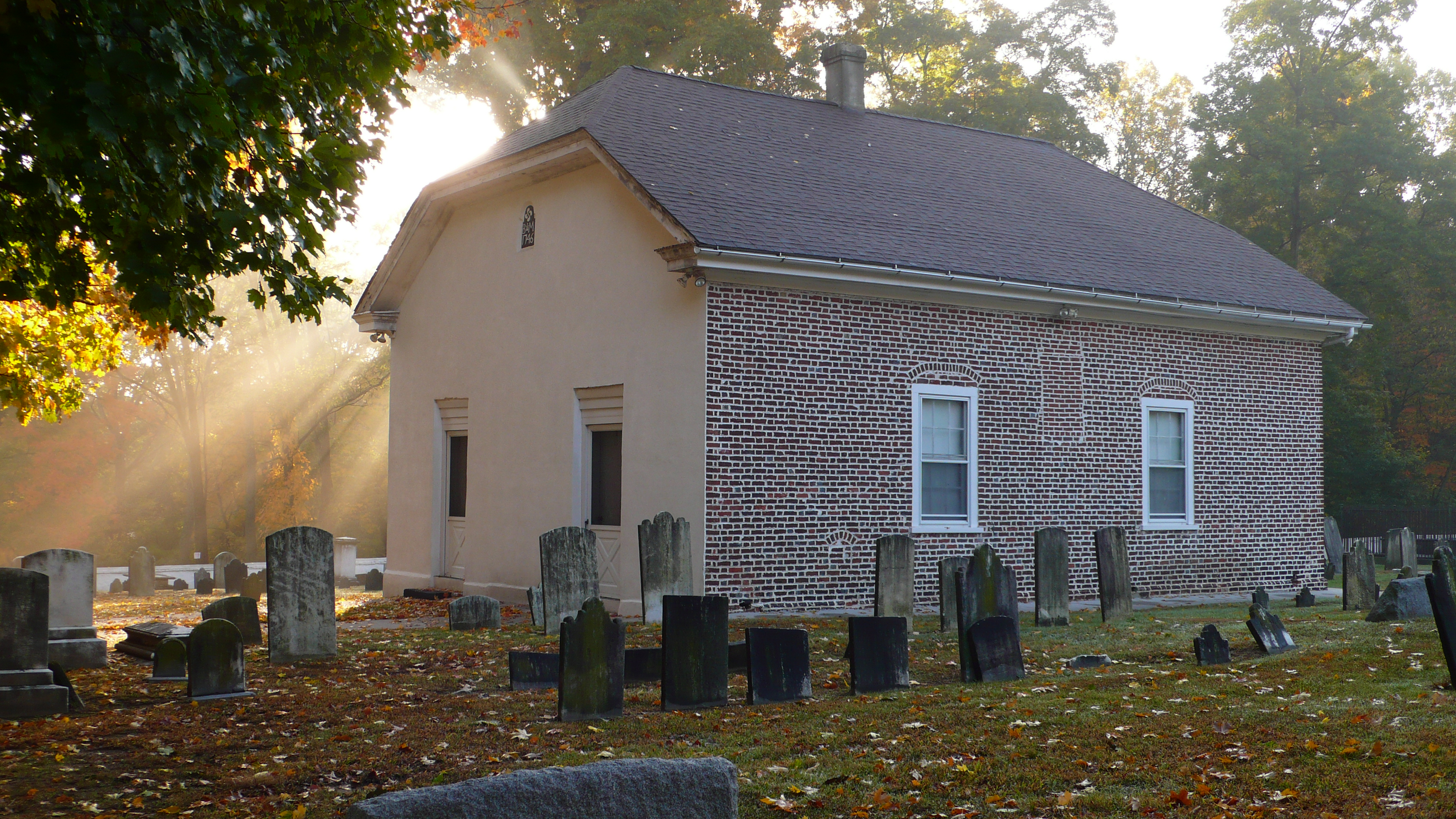
- Welsh Tract Baptist Church, October 2012

- Location within Delaware Location within the United States
- Location: Welsh Tract Rd., Newark, Delaware
- Coordinates: 39°39′1″N 75°45′7″W
- Area: 5 acres (2.0 ha)
- Built: 1746
- NRHP reference No.: 73000527
- Added to NRHP: March 1, 1973

Welsh Tract Old School Baptist Church is a historic Primitive Baptist church, located on Welsh Tract Road in Newark, New Castle County, Delaware. It was built by Welsh settlers in 1746 and is a simple rectangular brick building with a wood-shingled jerkinhead roof.

== History ==
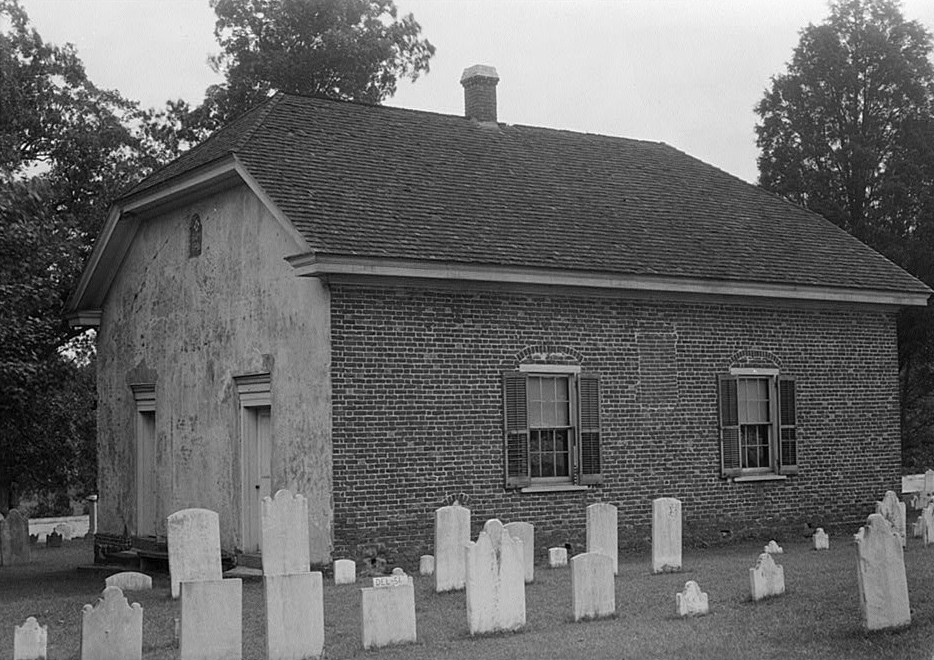
Welsh Tract Old School Baptist Church in 1936

The Baptist movement had gained significant ground in England and Wales during the religious turmoil that embroiled the British Isles through the 17th century. Although the Tolerance Act was passed by the English Parliament in 1689 in an attempt to end the religious strife, by the end of that century, new efforts were being made by the English Crown to reinforce the hegemony of the Anglican church over all "Dissenter" groups in the realm. In the spring of 1701, sixteen Baptists, in the counties of Pembroke and Carmarthen, South Wales, resolved to go to America. They formed themselves into a church, with Thomas Griffith, one of their number, as Pastor. They embarked at Milford Haven in June, 1701, arriving in Philadelphia September, 8th, the same year. Local Baptist leaders advised them to join an established congregation nearby along the Pennepeck Creek.

The immigrant group settled there for about a year and a half. During that time they kept together as a distinct church, held meetings at each other's residences, and observed the ordinances of Christ in a manner they had brought with them from Wales. In the two years, twenty-one persons were added to their number.

The ceremony of laying on of hands was the principal, if not sole, means of introducing singing, imposition of hands, church covenants, etc., among Welsh Baptists, and they maintained that practice in Pennsylvania. But not without some difficulty, as appears from the following history translated from the Welsh Tract book:

But we could not be in fellowship (at the Lord's table) with our brethren in Pennypack and Philadelphia, because they did not hold to the laying on of hands, and some other particulars relating to a church; true, some of them believed in the ordinance, but neither preached it nor practiced it; and when we moved to Welsh Tract, and left twenty-two of our members at Pennypack, and took some of their members down with us, the difficulty increased. We had many meetings to compromise matters, but to no purpose, till June 22d, 1706; then the following deputies (naming twenty-five persons) met at the house of Bro. Richard Miles, in Radnor, Delaware County, Pa., and agreed

- That a member of either church might transiently Commune with the other.
- That a member who desired to come under the laying on of hands might have his liberty without offence.
- That the votaries of the rite might preach or debate upon the subject with all freedom, consistent with charity and brotherly love.

But three years after this meeting we had reason to review the transaction, because of some brethren who arrived from Wales, and one among ourselves, who questioned whether the first article was warrantable; but we are satisfied that all was right, by the good effects which followed: for from that time forth our brethren held sweet communion together at the Lord's table, and our minister, Rev. Thomas Griffiths [sic], was invited to preach and assist at an ordination at Pennypack, after the death of our Bro. Watts. He proceeded from thence to the Jerseys, where he enlightened many in the good ways of the Lord, insomuch that, in three years after, all the ministers and about twenty- five private members had submitted to the ordinance."

Because of the discomfort created with the other Baptists in Pennypack over the Welsh practice, the Welsh Baptists soon decided to seek a new home. In 1703, they purchased 30,000 acres in New Castle County, Delaware, near what is now known as Newark, Delaware, deeded by William Penn in the 1680s to three Baptists: David Evans, William Davis, and William Willis. Known as the Welsh Tract, it included Iron Hill and reached all the way to its northern slopes, now part of Interstate I-95. A small meeting-house was erected on the property, and the community became known as the "Emigrant Church", in part because of the then-unusual practices of laying of hands and singing of psalms. This church stood until it was replaced with a new edifice, built in 1746. Thomas Griffith served as the first pastor of the church until he died on July 25, 1725, aged eighty years.

Members of the church were dismissed to form other Baptist churches of like faith and order in Delaware and elsewhere, including the London Tract, Duck Creek, Wilmington, Cow Marsh, Mispillion, and Pedee (South Carolina) Baptist churches. Its practices became standard practice for Baptist churches throughout the Middle States. Paul Palmer, founder of the "Palmer" branch of the Free Will Baptists, attended Welsh Tract Baptist Church in the 1700s.

== Division between Old School and New School Baptists ==
Welsh Tract Baptist Church continued in union with the Philadelphia Baptist Association of which it was a co-founder church until the church was dismissed from the association to form the Delaware River Old School Baptist Association in 1836 under the pastorate of Elder Samuel Trott. The Old School Baptists separated themselves from the majority of Baptist churches in America who formed the Triennial Convention in 1814 due to what the Old School Baptists considered novel practices not found in the New Testament regarding mission societies, bible societies, Sunday Schools, ministerial education, revival meetings, and the like. This rift finally led to a full division in 1832 with the Black Rock Declaration of Principles.

Elder Trott, according to the Brief History of Old Welsh Tract Church published in 1903 is quoted as saying:

We receive Christ as our pattern, hence we do not walk in the observance of many things which have been introduced among the Baptists generally, and received as great importance in advancing the cause of religion, &c. We desire to keep in His footsteps, believing it to be the safest path. We rely on His wisdom and power to gather in His elect and extend the knowledge of His salvation.

The history goes on to say:

In the Circular Letter in 1832, he condemns missions, salaried ministries and Theological Seminaries. Elder Thomas Barton in 1832 writes: "We hope none of us are prepared to adopt the invitation of Jehu: "Come, see my zeal for the Lord of Hosts," but with humility would acknowledge our shortcomings; we know that the work of salvation is of God, and why He does not convert more sinners among us we leave to Him". In 1836 the association refused by vote to receive into fellowship persons baptized by those who are engaged in the new-fangled systems of the day. In 1856, for the first time, the association was called in the Minutes, "The Delaware Old School Baptist Association."

The church continues to have meetings every second Sunday of the month. Elder Robert Lackey is the present pastor.

The church has no official website, but members and friends have websites (Facebook, YouTube, and a Blog) that promote the doctrines and faith of the church. There is also a publishing company devoted to Old School Baptist principles - Welsh Tract Publications.

The property was added to the National Register of Historic Places in 1973.
