= Cochecho River =

Cochecho River Cocheco River
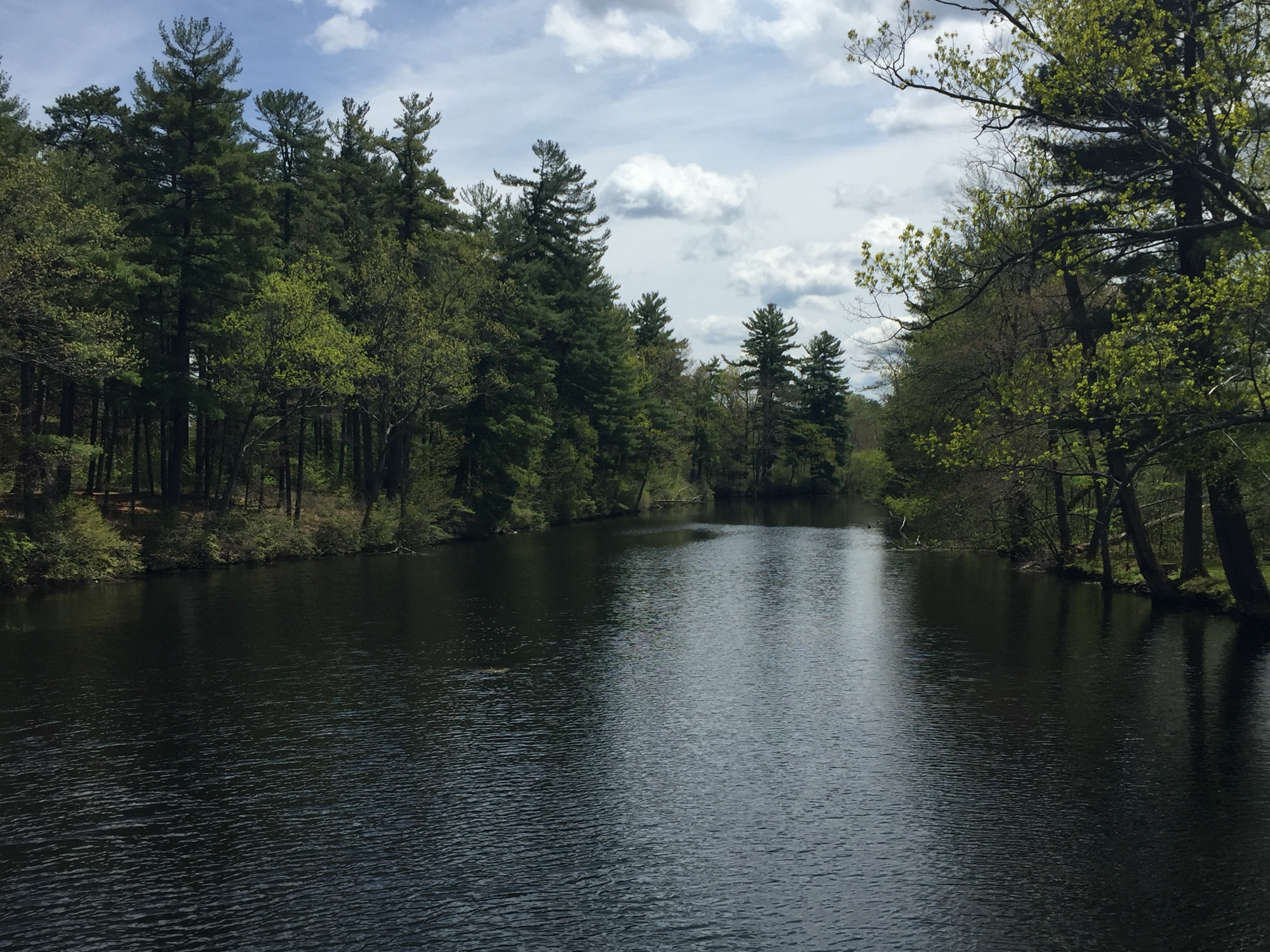
- The Cochecho at Hanson Pines, Rochester

- Location within New Hampshire Location within the United States

Location
- Country: United States
- State: New Hampshire
- County: Strafford
- Towns & cities: New Durham, Farmington, Rochester, Dover

Physical characteristics
- Source
  - location: New Durham
  - coordinates: 43°27′34″N 71°6′57″W
  - elevation: 880 ft (270 m)
- Mouth: Piscataqua River
  - location: Dover
  - coordinates: 43°10′32″N 70°49′29″W
  - elevation: 0 ft (0 m)
- Length: 38.3 mi (61.6 km)

Basin features
- Tributaries
  - left: Dames Brook, Blackwater Brook, Fresh Creek
  - right: Hayes Brook, Ela River, Mad River, Rattlesnake River, Axe Handle Brook, Isinglass River

The Cochecho River (also spelled as Cocheco River) is a tributary of the Piscataqua River, 38.3 miles (61.6 km) long, in the U.S. state of New Hampshire. It rises in northern Strafford County and runs southeastward, through the town of Farmington and the cities of Rochester and Dover, where it provides hydroelectric power. Below the center of Dover, the river is tidal and joins the Salmon Falls River at the Maine border to form the Piscataqua. Significant tributaries include the Ela River, the Mad River, and the Isinglass River.

== History of the name ==
Cochecho is an Abenaki word meaning "rapid foaming water," referring to Cochecho Falls in downtown Dover. Settlers adopted the name for both the river and principal settlement, the village of Cochecho.

In 1642, Richard Waldron was granted water privileges at Cochecho Falls, moving there from Dover Point to build a sawmill and gristmill. During the Industrial Revolution, these industries would be supplanted by cotton textile mills. In 1827, the Cocheco Manufacturing Company was founded, and its brick buildings would come to dominate the riverfront. But as historian Caroline Harwood Garland writes, "By an error of the engrossing clerk in the act of incorporation, the old Indian word, Cochecho, became Cocheco." As historian Alonzo Hall Quint laments: "The chief fault of the present Company is their barbarous spelling of 'Cocheco' instead of 'Cochecho,' for which no possible excuse exists."

In an 1851 essay written for the Dover Enquirer, Quint records the history of the Cochecho River's name:

It has been ill-treated in a most serious manner. Every person seems to have felt himself authorized to manage its orthography in any way he chose; hence all sorts of ways of spelling it have prevailed.

The first record in which we meet the name is in 1642, and in that the name is spelt CUTTCHECHOE, the pronunciation of which is evident. In 1648 it is spelt COCHCHECHOE and so pronounced for many years. In 1650 COCHECHAE is met with for once, and the pronunciation of this manner of spelling was that usually followed about 1670. In later times the pronunciation of the last syllable had reverted to the original form, that of the first and second remaining as it was so that Cochecho became the name; this is seen to be almost the exact original pronunciation and has been well settled for years. The spelling KECHEACHY was used occasionally a few years after 1700, but it never came into general use. The form QUOCHECHO is an unmitigated barbarism, so is COCHECO, although its unfortunate adoption by the Manufacturing Company of this place has given some credit to that form. The form COCHECHO is best supported by old examples and is at present generally adopted by all who know anything of its origin."

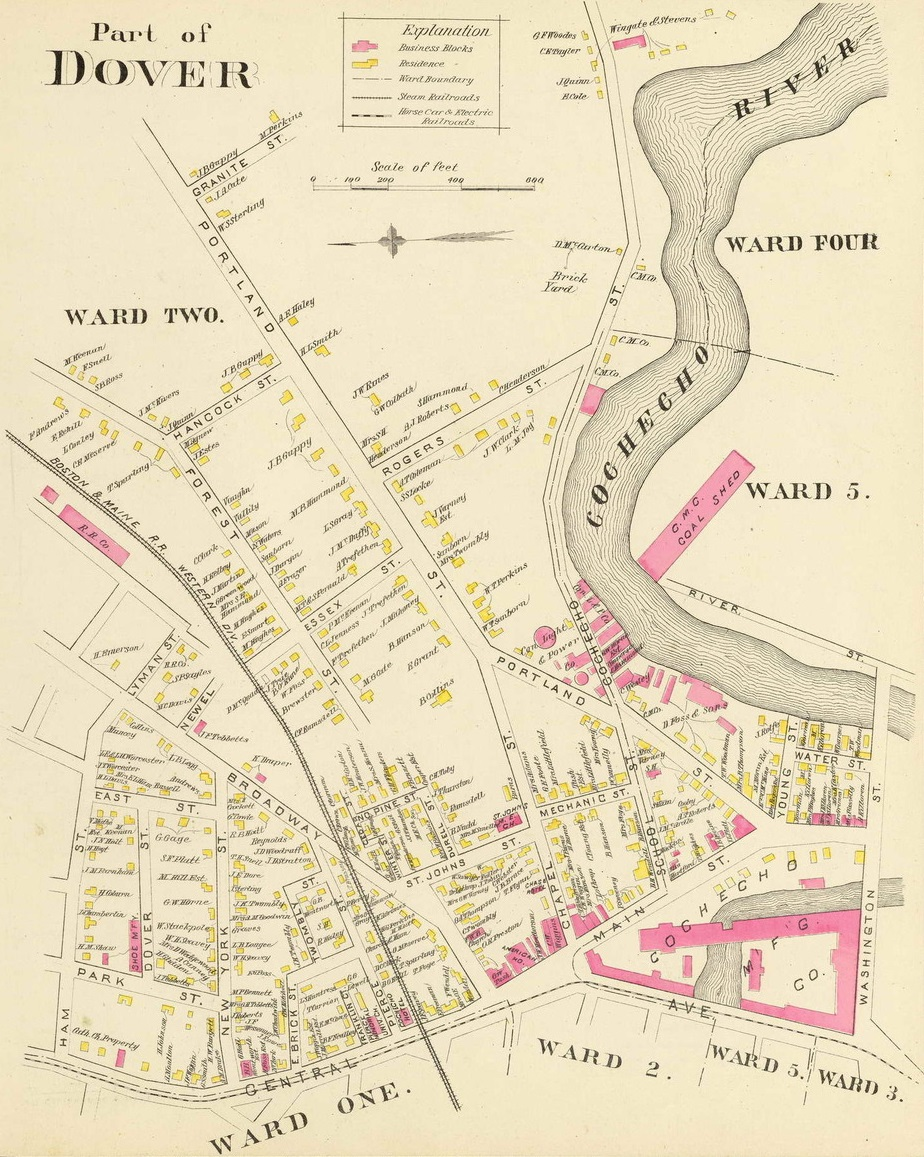
Plan of Dover in 1892

In 1909, Pacific Mills of Lawrence, Massachusetts bought the Cocheco Manufacturing Company and set about making changes, one of which was to end the disparity between the river's historic spelling and its brand.

Nevertheless, Dover's original name did not go away. Instead, the dual spellings began a semiotic conflict which continues to this day, with signs on Dover city bridges identifying the stream as the Cochecho River, while maps identify it as the Cocheco River.

In 1937, the Cocheco Manufacturing Company folded, a casualty of the Great Depression. All that remains of the mill are its repurposed factory buildings, listed on the National Register of Historic Places, and its brand name on the river.

== See also ==
- List of rivers of New Hampshire
