= Free Will Baptist =

Protestant Baptist sub-group

Benjamin Randall (1749–1808) was the founder of the (later) Northern Free Will Baptist movement in New England in the late 18th century.

Free Will Baptists or Free Baptists are a sub-group of General Baptists that emphasizes the teaching of free salvation and free will. The group can be traced back to 17th century England.

In 1702, Paul Palmer would go on to establish the Free Will Baptists in North Carolina and in 1727 formed the Free Will Baptist Church of Chowan. Many Calvinists became Free Will Baptists in the 19th century. With the establishment of Free Will Baptists in the South, Benjamin Randall developed the movement in the Northeastern United States.

Free Will Baptists, as a sub-group originating from the General Baptist (Arminian) strand of the Baptist tradition, follow the notion of self-governance of local churches, like other Dissenters from the Church of England.

== History ==
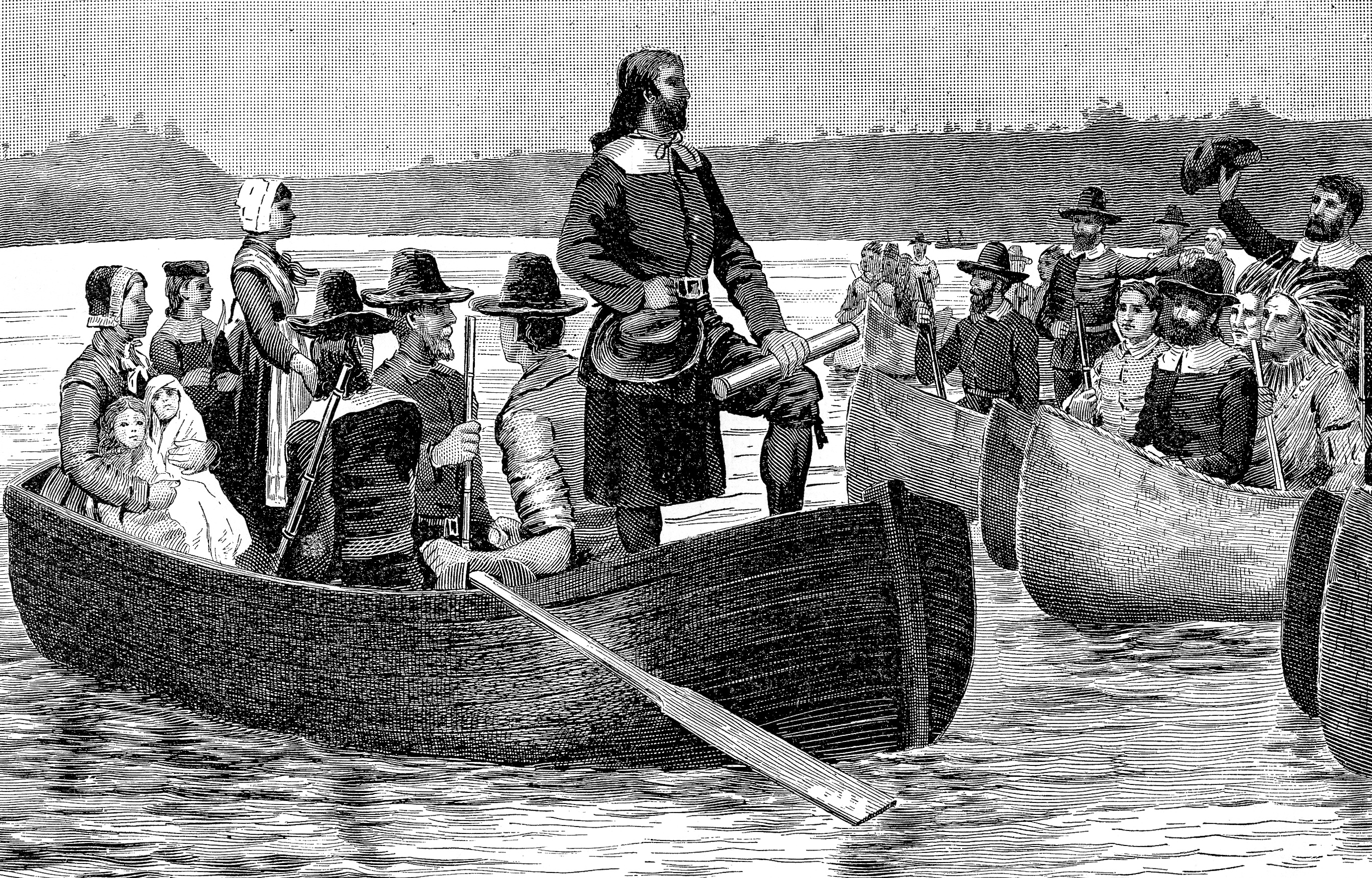
Return of Roger Williams, a later supporter of the movement, after denouncing the Puritan movement in 1644

Free Will Baptists can be traced to General Baptists from England who settled in the American colonies in the 17th century. The early Baptists, who initially started to develop with the ministry of Thomas Helwys at London in 1612, were General Baptists. That is, they believed that the atonement of Jesus Christ was general (for all) rather than particular (only for the elect). It shares a common history and title of the Arminian doctrine.

Benjamin Laker was an English Baptist who arrived in colonial Carolina as early as 1685. Laker was a signer of the second edition (1663) of the Standard Confession of Faith, and had been associated of Thomas Grantham, a prominent Reformed Arminian Baptist theologian and author. The earliest Free Will Baptists developed from English General Baptists in Carolina, who were dubbed "Freewillers" by their opponents and later assumed the name.

Two distinct branches of Free Will Baptists developed in America. The first and earliest was the movement described above, known as the Palmer-line in North Carolina, from which the majority of Free Will Baptists today have their origin. The later movement was the Randall-line, which arose in the late 18th century in New Hampshire. These two groups developed independently of each other.

=== Palmer-line ===
In 1702, non-organized General Baptists in Carolina wrote a request for help to the General Association of General Baptists in England. Though no help was forthcoming, Paul Palmer, whose wife Johanna was the stepdaughter of Benjamin Laker, established the first "Free Will" Baptist church in Chowan, North Carolina in 1727. Palmer organized at least two other churches in North Carolina. His labors, though important, were short.

Leadership would descend to Joseph Parker, William Parker, Josiah Hart, William Sojourner and others. Joseph Parker was part of the organization of the Chowan church and ministered among the Carolina churches for over 60 years. The movement grew to over 20 churches by 1755. After 1755, missionary labors conducted by the Philadelphia Baptist Association turned most of these churches Calvinists. By 1770, only four churches and four ministers remained Free Will Baptists. By the end of the 18th century, these churches were commonly referred to as "Free Will Baptist", and this would later be referred to as the "Palmer line of Free Will Baptists". The churches in the Palmer line organized various associations and conferences and organized a general conference in 1921. Many Baptists from Calvinist backgrounds, primarily Separate Baptists, became Free Will Baptists in the 19th century.

=== Randall-line ===
While the movement in the South was struggling, a new movement rose in the North through the work of Benjamin Randall. Randall initially united with the Particular Baptists in 1776 but broke with them in 1779 due to their strict views on predestination. In 1780 Randall formed a "Free" or "Freewill" Baptist church in New Durham, New Hampshire (Randall would combine the words "free" and "will" into a single word). By 1782 twelve churches had been established, and they organized a Quarterly Meeting. In 1792 a Yearly Meeting was organized.

The "Randall-line" line split into two groups in 1835:

- The "Bullockites", after Jeremiah Bullock (sometimes spelled "Bulloch" and "Bullochites"), which branched out to a small number of churches in Maine and New Hampshire.
- The "Buzzelites", after John Buzzell.

The Bullockites, mostly under the name "Freewill Baptists", continued in Maine into the early 20th century, while the Buzzellites disappeared shortly after their founding.

In 1841, Randall's Free Will Baptists merged with a similar group, the Free Communion Baptists, to form the Free Baptists.

The Randall-line of Freewill Baptists grew quickly. In 1911, the majority of the Free Will Baptist churches in the Northeast merged with the American Baptist Churches USA. Those churches that did not merge joined with other Free Will Baptists in the Southwest and Midwest to organize the Cooperative General Association of Free Will Baptists in 1916.

=== Union ===
Fraternal relations had existed between the Northern and Southern Free Will Baptists, but the question of slavery, and later the Civil War, prevented any formal union until the 20th century. On November 5, 1935, representatives of the General Conference (Palmer-line) and the Cooperative General Association (a mixture of the Randall and Palmer line at the west of the Mississippi) met in Nashville, Tennessee, to unite and organize the National Association of Free Will Baptists. The majority of Free Will Baptist churches organized under this umbrella, which remains the largest of the Free Will Baptist groups to this day.

== Theology and practice ==
Free Will Baptist congregations believe the Bible is the very word of God and without error. Free Will Baptist doctrine teaches that God desires salvation for all and sent Jesus to die for everyone. Still, Free Will Baptists believe that God has sovereignly given man the choice to accept or reject Christ's sacrifice. Faith is the condition for salvation; hence, Free Will Baptists hold to conditional security. An individual is "saved by faith and kept by faith." In support of this concept, some Free Will Baptists refer to the Greek word translated "believeth" found in John 3:16 in the King James translation. This is a continuous action verb and can thus be read, "that whosoever believes and continues to believe shall not perish, but have everlasting life." The concept is not of someone sinning occasionally and thus accidentally ending up "not saved," but instead of someone "repudiating" his or her faith in Christ. Thus "once saved, always saved" is rejected.

On Perseverance of the Saints from the official Treatise:

"There are strong grounds to hope that the truly regenerate will persevere unto the end, and be saved, through the power of divine grace which is pledged for their support; but their future obedience and final salvation are neither determined nor certain, since through infirmity and manifold temptations they are in danger of falling; and they ought, therefore, to watch and pray lest they make shipwreck of their faith and be lost."

Free Will Baptists observe at least three ordinances or sacraments: baptism, the Lord's Supper, and the foot washing, a rite occurring among some Evangelical denominations. The majority of Baptist don't observe foot washing. Free Will Baptists hold differing views on eschatology, with some holding Historical Premillennialism and others Amillennialism. They also advocate voluntary tithing, teetotalism, and not working on Sunday, the Christian Sabbath.

== Bodies ==
The National Association of Free Will Baptists is the largest of the Free Will Baptist groups. Other major Free Will Baptist groups include:

- Original Free Will Baptist Convention – a North Carolina–based body of Free Will Baptists that was organized in 1913 and initially joined the National Association of Free Will Baptists but split in 1961 due to some inner differences. The Convention comprised the majority of North Carolina–based Free Will Baptist churches, though a minority split from the North Carolina state convention and maintain affiliation with the National Association. The Convention maintains mission activity in eight countries: Philippines, Mexico, Bulgaria, India, Nepal, Bangladesh, Liberia, and Guinea.
- United American Free Will Baptist Church – the largest body of African-American Free Will Baptist churches, organized in 1901 and headquartered in Kinston, North Carolina.
- United American Free Will Baptist Conference – a body of African-American Free Will Baptist churches that withdrew from the United American Free Will Baptist Church in 1968; headquartered in Lakeland, Florida.
- Old Original Free Will Baptist Conference, an episcopal African-American association with six churches, centered in North Carolina.
- Evangelical Free Baptist Church – based in Illinois. In 1987, it had 22 churches and 2,500 members.
- Unaffiliated Free Will Baptist local associations – a number of local Free Will Baptist associations remain independent of the National Association, Original FWB Convention, and the two United American bodies. Researchers have identified 10 such associations, though there may be more. The unaffiliated associations of Free Will Baptists include over 300 churches with an estimated 22,000 members. They have no organization beyond the "local" level.
- Pentecostal Free Will Baptist Church, a former Free Will Baptist denomination now Holiness Pentecostal in doctrine, chiefly a second work of grace (entire sanctification) and a third work of grace (Spirit baptism evidenced by speaking in tongues); it has around 150 congregations.

== See also ==
- Storer College
- Welch College
