= Benjamin Randall =

American Baptist leader (1749–1808)

The Reverend Benjamin Randall
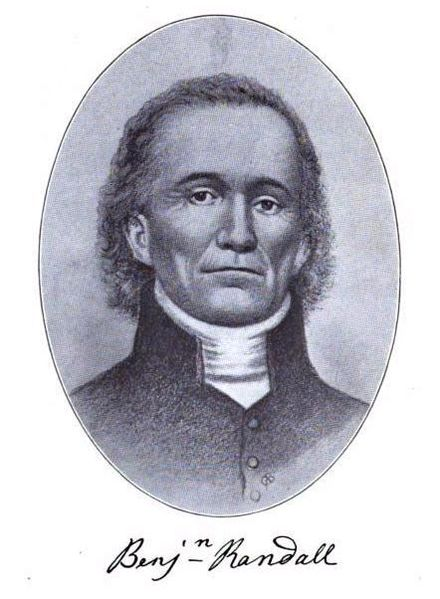
- Born: February 7, 1749; New Castle, Province of New Hampshire, British America
- Died: October 22, 1808 (aged 59); New Castle, New Hampshire, U.S.

Benjamin Randall (February 7, 1749 – October 22, 1808) was an American Baptist minister the main organizer of the Free Will Baptists (Randall Line) in the northeastern United States.

== Biography ==
=== Early years ===
Benjamin Randall III was born February 7, 1749, at New Castle, Province of New Hampshire to sea captain Benjamin Randall, Jr. (born 1712), and his wife, the former Margaret Mordantt. He was the oldest of 9 children born to the pair, both of whom were of ethnic English heritage.

Randall was provided with a "good commercial education" in the primitive public schools of the day, supplemented with extensive personal reading. A considerable part of Randall's youth was spent as a cabin boy aboard his father's ship, but he did not enjoy the experience, being a sensitive and pious youth who read the Bible daily.

At the age of 17 Randall was apprenticed to a sailmaker in Portsmouth, New Hampshire, with whom he remained until the age of 21. He parlayed the sewing skills he developed as a sailmaker to the profession of tailoring, becoming proficient at the craft, and occasionally venturing to the related craft of tent-making when such work was to be found.

On September 23, 1770, Christian evangelist George Whitefield paid a visit to Portsmouth as part of his last speaking tour of the country, arriving barely a week before his death. Randall heard Whitefield's sermons several times and was shaken and moved by news of his death. A short period of religious meditation followed with the effect that Randall's piety was awakened and he was himself energized as an evangelist of Christianity.

Despite his religious awakening, Randall continued to work in Marblehead and Salem, Massachusetts during 1771, returning to his native New Castle in the fall of that year to set up shop as a sailmaker in October of that year. In November 1771 he married Joanna Oram (born 1748) of Kittery, Maine, the daughter of another sea captain.

In 1772 Randall and his wife became members of the Congregationalist church of New Castle, but he soon came to find it unfulfilling, finding himself possessed of a zealous religious passion and determination to save souls that was not reciprocated by his fellow congregants. In the spring of 1774 Randall pushed the idea of conducting open meetings which might be attended by a broader public, who could be drawn into the church through the reading of printed sermons, public prayer, and singing.

The holding of public meetings by laymen soon drew the ire of the local church pastor, who quickly came to regard Randall as a rival. This drama would be interrupted by the coming of the American Revolutionary War.

=== Military interlude ===
Randall was an ardent American patriot during the revolutionary crisis of 1775 to 1776, and with the outbreak of armed hostilities he briefly enlisted in the Massachusetts militia in the company of Captain John Parsons at New Castle during the first half of 1775. The immediate crisis subsided, however, and the company was soon dismissed.

Following another brief scare in the fall of 1775 Randall again enlisted for a term of two months as an assistant commissary. He would reenlist in September 1776 as a sergeant in a regiment headed by Colonel Pierce Lang, ultimately serving as a militia soldier for a year and a half. Randall remained devout in his Christianity during his military stint, later declaring that he "never lived nearer to God than during that campaign experience."

During his military tenure Randall made a point of regularly visiting the sick and performing the duties of a chaplain in offering religious consolation. Randall was mocked by some within the ranks for his religious exuberance but his actions were ultimately backed by the unit's commanding officer, who threatened severe punishment to any who continued to deride Randall's heartfelt efforts, thereby easing the situation.

=== Religious conversion ===
In 1776 Randall found himself in fundamental agreement with the evangelical teachings of the Calvinistic Baptists, and he joined this comparatively small, isolated, and unpopular sect, which believed in active evangelism and the doctrine of baptism by immersion. He soon was an active participant in the Baptist church, reading published sermons and becoming a layman preacher of original sermons in 1777.

Randall was a zealous public speaker on behalf of his faith, holding public meetings day and night and preaching an average of four times a week. Some 30 people were converted at Randall's revival meetings, which were non-standard in form and perceived as a threat by many in the community.

Randall later recalled that "persecution grew very hot, and such threatening language was used that I really felt my life in danger." He was nearly struck in the head with a thrown piece of a brick when walking down the street one day, narrowly escaping death or serious injury when the shard grazed his hair. Randall spent the summer of 1777 traveling farther and farther afield on preaching tours throughout the New England region.

In March 1778 Randall and his family left New Castle for a new home in New Durham, New Hampshire, where they would settle for the rest of Randall's life. Randall became the only resident preacher in the town, his predecessor having recently resigned over a salary dispute. The people of the community built a meeting house for their new religious leader, who maintained himself through the voluntary contributions of his congregation and various odd jobs in tailoring, also tending a small household farm. He would continue to travel and preach to outlying communities, making New Durham his base of operations.

=== Break with Calvinism ===
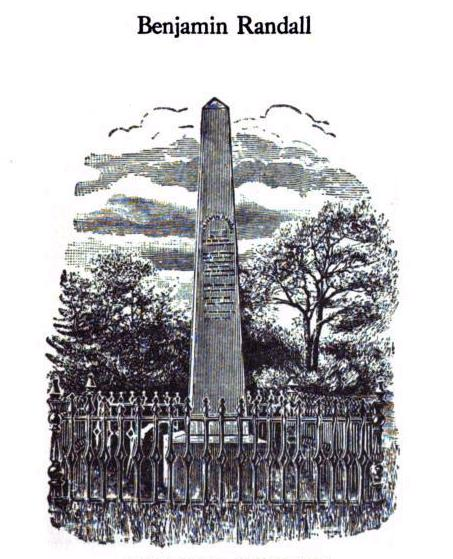
Benjamin Randall's grave

Randall's theological orientation tended towards the idea of rapid salvation, freely available to all who repented of their sins and believed. This idea of free salvation proved to be in conflict with the fundamental doctrines of Calvinism, including predestination, which dominated the official Baptist church. Orthodox followers of the church's doctrine charged Randall with teaching anti-Calvinist doctrines, prompting his split from the church in 1780.

On April 5, 1780, Randall was ordained in New Durham, which was at the time performed by two ordained ministers in good standing laying hands upon the candidate. Two such local ministers were found and Randall was thereby officially qualified for the ministry, given the honorific "Elder," a title commonly given to gospel ministers in the day.

In June 1780, new Articles of Faith and Church Covenant were drawn up by Randall in New Durham and the first Free Baptist church was established — although for the first two decades after this date no prefix to the Baptist name was used. By the end of the year the church numbered seven men and thirteen women.

Randall's doctrine was based upon the notion that human beings had minds which provided them the free will to act and that God was ready to fully forgive behavioral errors resulting from that free volition. Complete atonement for sin was available to all based upon genuine repentance, which was a requirement of God. The duty of religious exhortation to make known that free salvation was available for any to embrace were fundamental pillars of Randall's belief.

Randall and his followers were dismissed by many contemporaries as adherents of a fanatical sect and were pejoratively called a variety of names, including "Randallites," "General Provisioners," "New-Lights," and "Freewillers."

=== Death and legacy ===
From the time of his lay preaching until his death of tuberculosis on October 22, 1808, Randall was instrumental in planting many Free Will Baptist churches throughout New England.

== See also ==
- Arminianism
- Free Will Baptist Church
- American Baptist Church
