= New Durham, New Hampshire =

Town in New Hampshire, United States

- Town
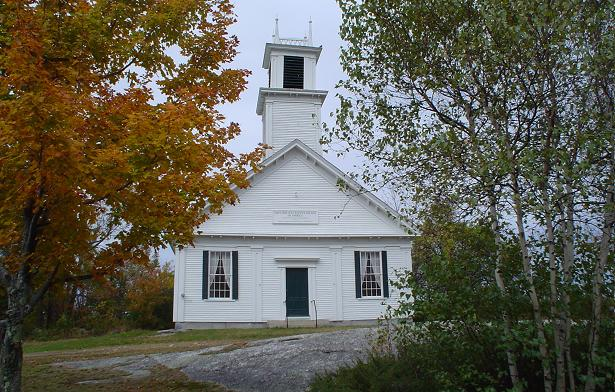
- Free Will Baptist Church

- Seal

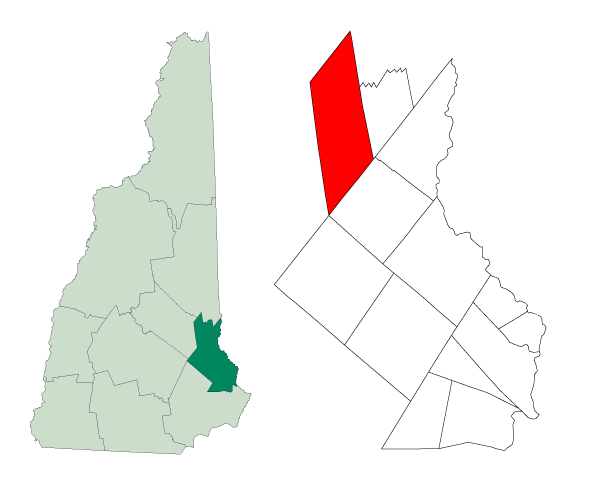
- Location in Strafford County, New Hampshire
- Coordinates: 43°26′45″N 71°07′50″W
- Country: United States
- State: New Hampshire
- County: Strafford
- Incorporated: 1762
- Villages: New Durham; New Durham Corner

Area
  - Total: 43.8 sq mi (113.5 km^{2})
  - Land: 41.2 sq mi (106.7 km^{2})
  - Water: 2.6 sq mi (6.8 km^{2}) 5.98%
- Elevation: 981 ft (299 m)

Population (2020)
  - Total: 2,693
  - Density: 65/sq mi (25.2/km^{2})
- Time zone: UTC-5 (Eastern)
  - Summer (DST): UTC-4 (Eastern)
- ZIP code: 03855
- Area code: 603
- FIPS code: 33-51220
- GNIS feature ID: 873677
- Website: www.newdurhamnh.us

New Durham is a town in Strafford County, New Hampshire, United States. The population was 2,693 at the 2020 census. It is drained by the Merrymeeting, Cocheco and Ela rivers, and is known for Merrymeeting Lake. New Durham is home to the Powder Mill Fish Hatchery, located on Merrymeeting Road. Also located here is the Lions Club's Camp Pride, a camp for children and adults with disabilities.

== History ==
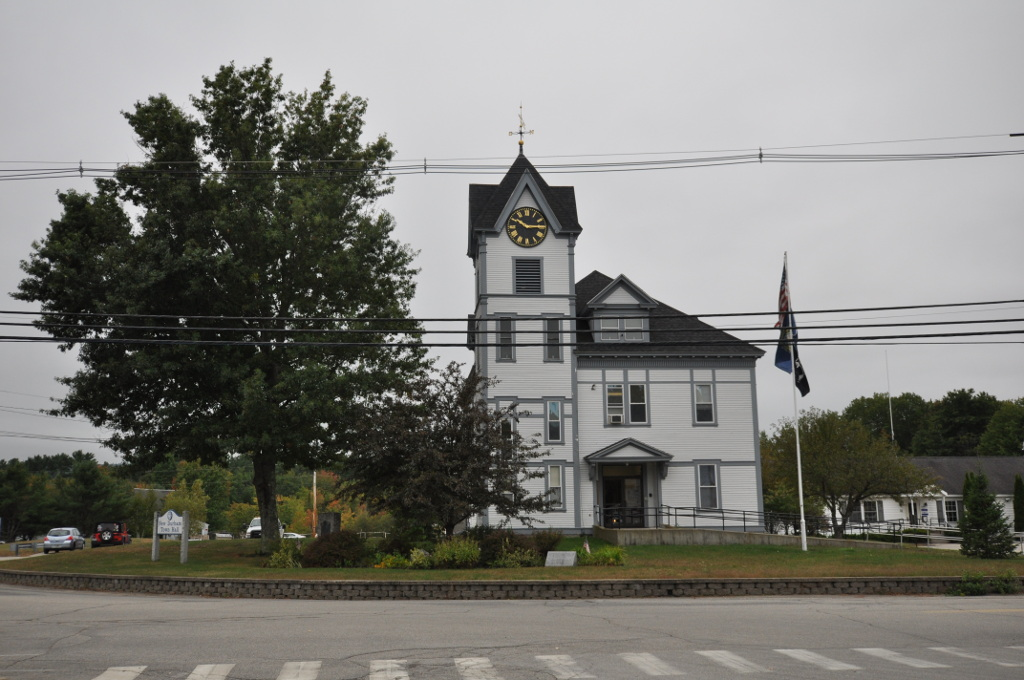
New Durham Town Hall

Granted by the Masonian Proprietors in 1749 as "Cochecho Township", New Durham was first settled by Europeans in 1750, almost entirely by colonists from Durham. It would be incorporated as "New Durham" on December 7, 1762. With a somewhat uneven and rocky surface, the town was better suited to grazing than cultivation. Lumber became the chief article of trade, and by 1859 New Durham had five sawmills and four shingle mills. It also had two gristmills, and a gunpowder factory called the Eureka Powder Works. On September 19, 1849, the Cocheco Railroad opened through the town, connecting Dover with Alton Bay.

An early town minister, Reverend Benjamin Randall, founded a new religious denomination in 1780 called the Free Will Baptists, later known as Free Baptists. The church has two buildings in the community; the older built in 1819 on New Durham Ridge.

== Geography ==
According to the United States Census Bureau, the town has a total area of 43.8 square miles (113.5 km^{2}), of which 41.2 square miles (106.7 km^{2}) are land and 2.6 square miles (6.8 km^{2}) are water, comprising 5.98% of the town. The southern part of the town is drained by the headwaters of the Cocheco River and its tributary, the Ela River, and is part of the Piscataqua River watershed, flowing to the Atlantic Ocean at Portsmouth. The northern part of town is home to Merrymeeting Lake and its outlet, the Merrymeeting River, which flows west to Lake Winnipesaukee and is part of the Merrimack River watershed. The highest point in town (and in Strafford County) is 1,712 feet (522 m) above sea level, on the southwestern slope of Copple Crown Mountain, along the town's eastern border. The mountain's 1,868-foot (569 m) summit is in the neighboring town of Brookfield, in Carroll County.

New Durham is served by New Hampshire Route 11.

== Demographics ==
Historical population
Census	Pop.	Note	%±
1790	554		—
1800	742		33.9%
1810	888		19.7%
1820	1,168		31.5%
1830	1,162		−0.5%
1840	1,032		−11.2%
1850	1,049		1.6%
1860	1,173		11.8%
1870	973		−17.1%
1880	772		−20.7%
1890	579		−25.0%
1900	625		7.9%
1910	523		−16.3%
1920	462		−11.7%
1930	448		−3.0%
1940	433		−3.3%
1950	463		6.9%
1960	474		2.4%
1970	583		23.0%
1980	1,183		102.9%
1990	1,974		66.9%
2000	2,220		12.5%
2010	2,638		18.8%
2020	2,693		2.1%
U.S. Decennial Census

As of the census of 2000, there were 2,220 people, 819 households, and 630 families residing in the town. The population density was 53.2 inhabitants per square mile (20.5/km^{2}). There were 1,309 housing units at an average density of 31.4 per square mile (12.1/km^{2}). The racial makeup of the town was 98.15% White, 0.23% African American, 0.18% Native American, 0.54% Asian, 0.27% from other races, and 0.63% from two or more races. Hispanic or Latino of any race were 0.41% of the population.

There were 819 households, out of which 36.1% had children under the age of 18 living with them, 67.2% were married couples living together, 4.9% had a female householder with no husband present, and 23.0% were non-families. 17.0% of all households were made up of individuals, and 5.6% had someone living alone who was 65 years of age or older. The average household size was 2.71 and the average family size was 3.05.

In the town, the population was spread out, with 27.3% under the age of 18, 4.3% from 18 to 24, 32.8% from 25 to 44, 24.9% from 45 to 64, and 10.7% who were 65 years of age or older. The median age was 38 years. For every 100 females, there were 107.7 males. For every 100 females age 18 and over, there were 106.5 males.

The median income for a household in the town was $52,270, and the median income for a family was $52,941. Males had a median income of $35,574 versus $28,092 for females. The per capita income for the town was $22,139. About 3.7% of families and 5.1% of the population were below the poverty line, including 5.9% of those under age 18 and 6.6% of those age 65 or over.

== Notable people ==
- Alfred M. Jones (1837–1910), Midwest politician and businessman born in New Durham
- Benjamin Randall (1749–1808), minister

== See also ==
- New Durham Meetinghouse and Pound
- New Durham Town Hall
