= Structure relocation =

Process of moving a structure from one location to another

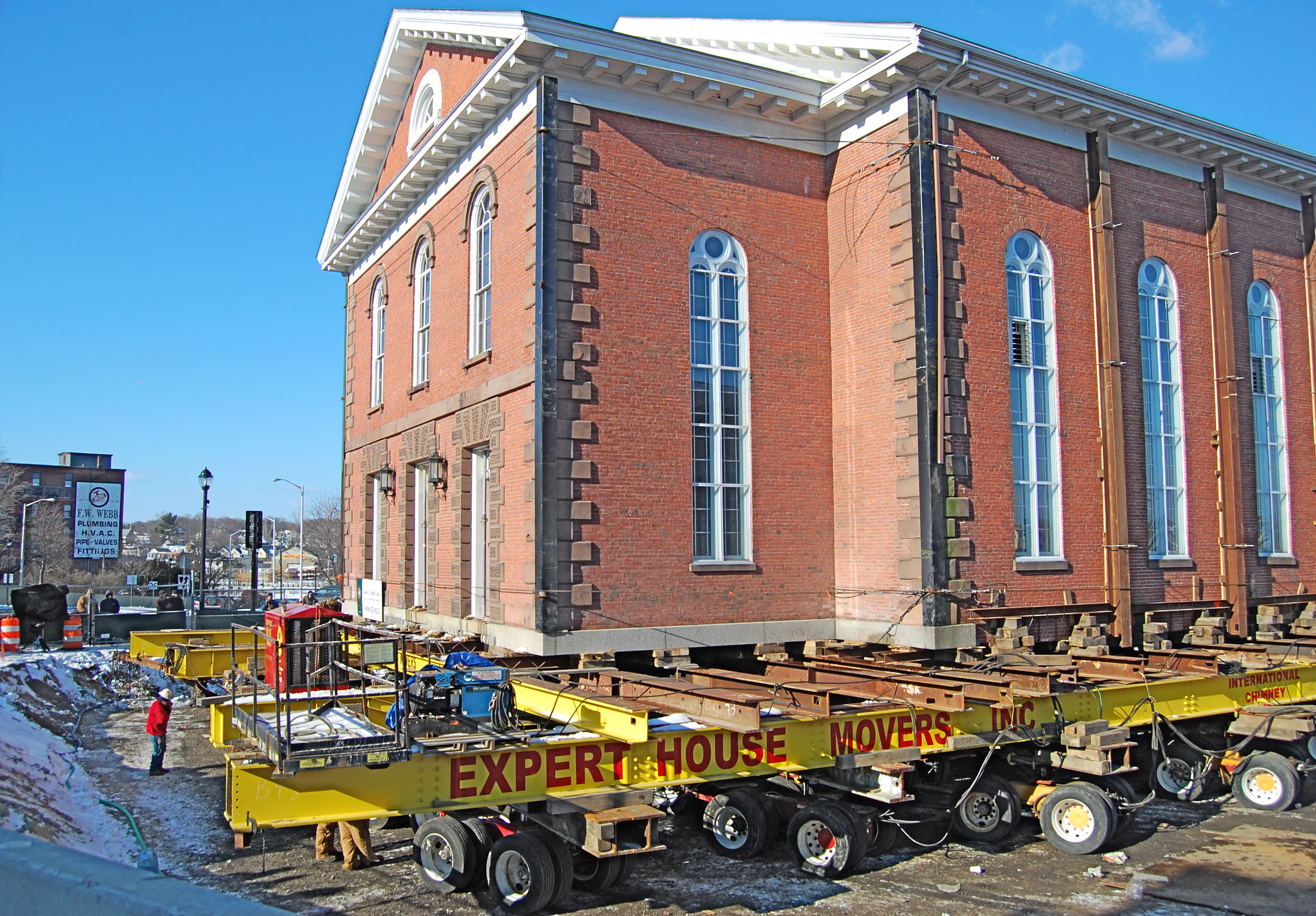
Hydraulically powered dollies move the historic 19th-century First Baptist Church in Salem, Massachusetts.

A structure relocation is the process of moving a structure from one location to another. There are two main ways for a structure to be moved: disassembling and then reassembling it at the required destination, or transporting it whole. For the latter, the building is first raised and then may be pushed on temporary rails or dollies if the distance is short. Otherwise, wheels, such as flatbed trucks, are used. These moves can be complicated and require the removal of protruding parts of the building, such as the chimney, as well as obstacles along the journey, such as overhead cables and trees.

Reasons for moving a building range from commercial reasons such as scenery to preserving an important or historic building. Moves may also be made simply at the whim of the owner, or to separate a building from the plot of land on which it stands.

== Equipment ==
Elevating a whole structure is typically done by attaching a temporary steel framework under the structure to support it. A network of hydraulic jacks is placed under the framework and controlled by a unified jacking system, elevating the structure off the foundation. An older, low-technology method is to use building jacks called screw jacks or jackscrews which are manually turned.

With both types of jacking systems, wood beams (called cribs, cribbing or box cribs) are stacked into piles to support both the structure and the jacks. The structure is then lifted in increments. Once the structure is at a sufficient height, hydraulic dollies (or a flatbed truck) are placed under the supporting framework. These are used to move the structure to the new location. After the move, the steps are reversed and the structure is lowered.

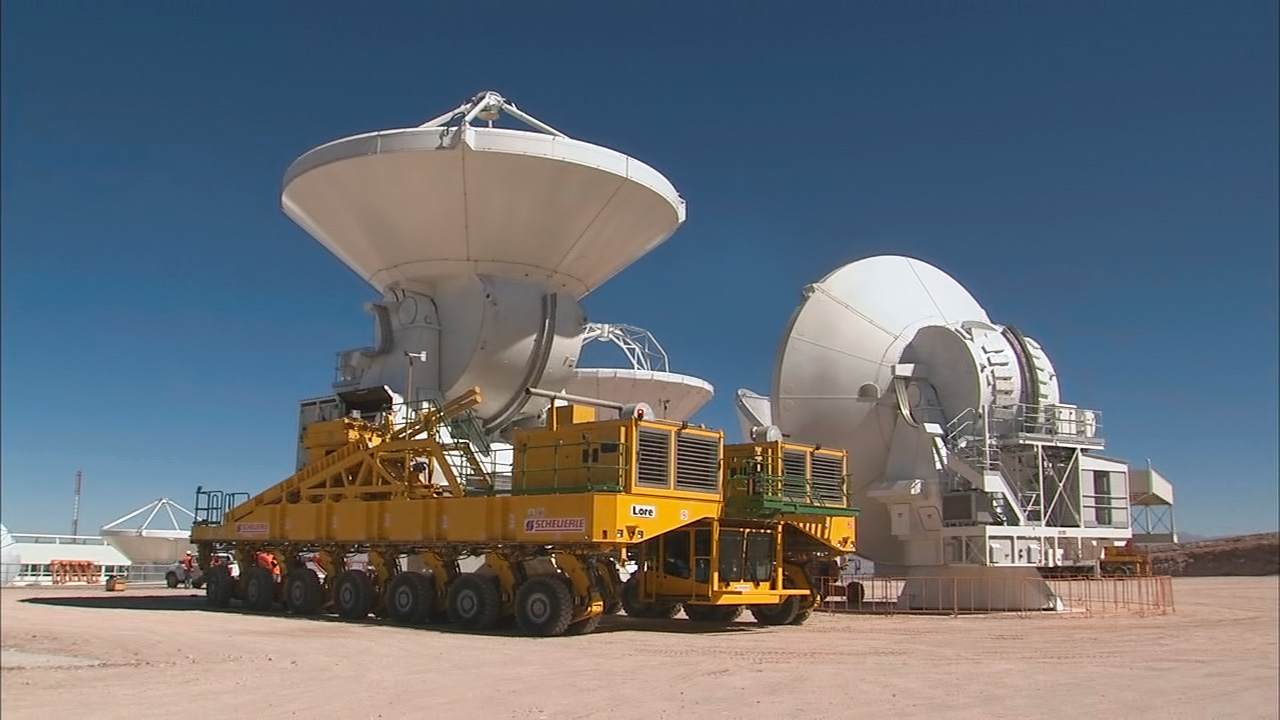
Relocation of an ALMA antenna

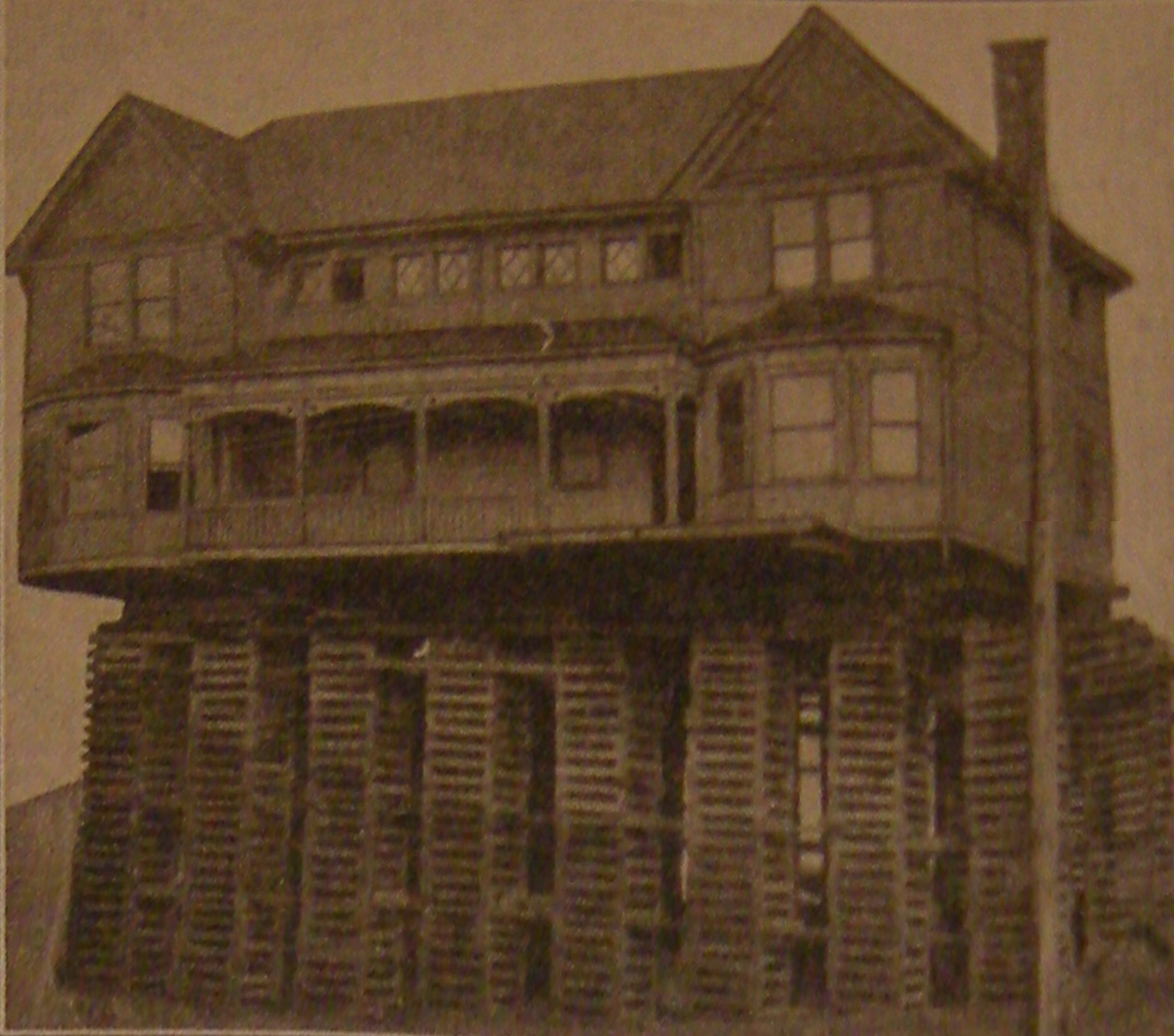
Cribbing beneath a Seattle, Washington house, 1917

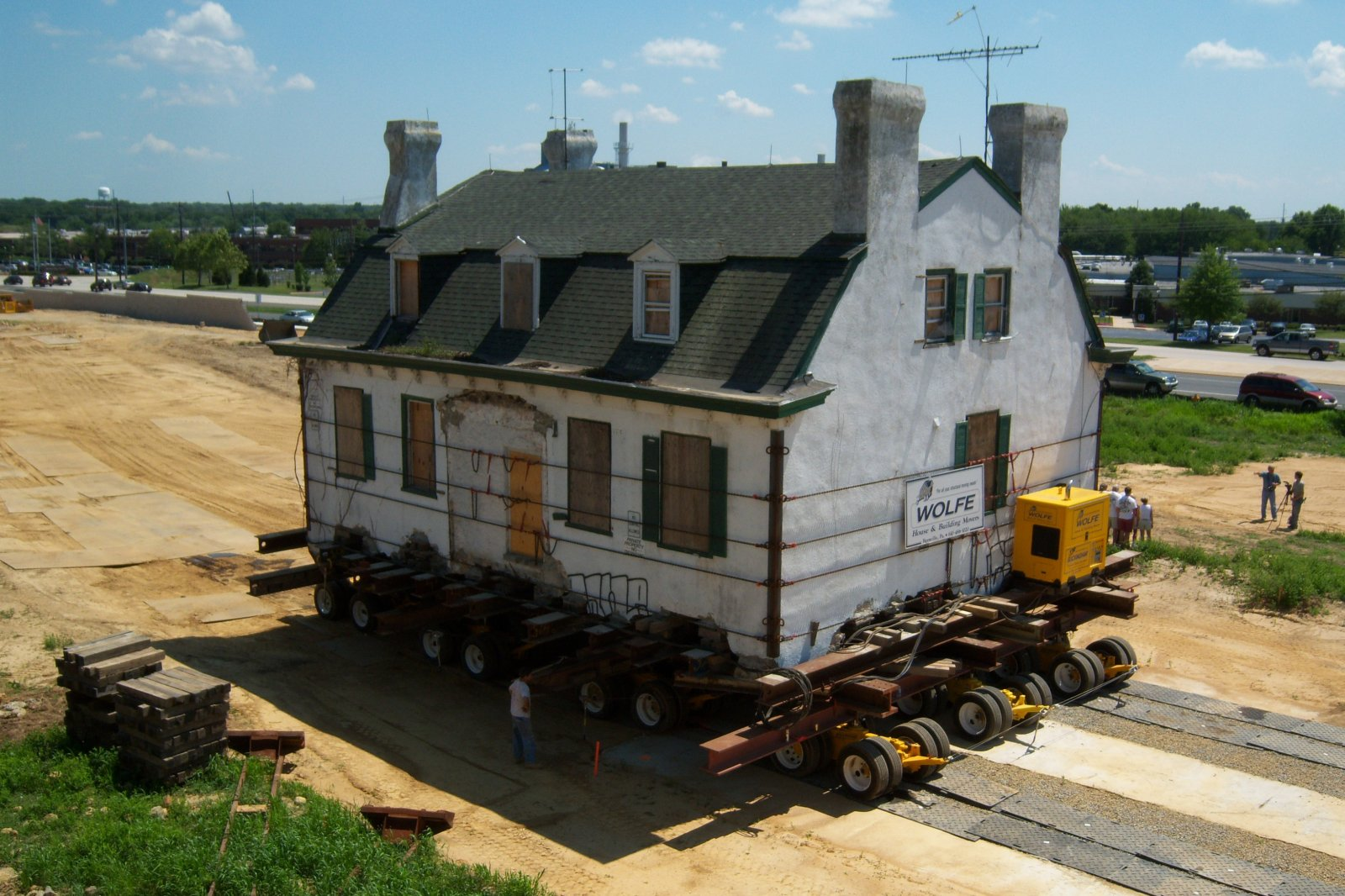
Hydraulic dolly system moving a house in Newark, Delaware

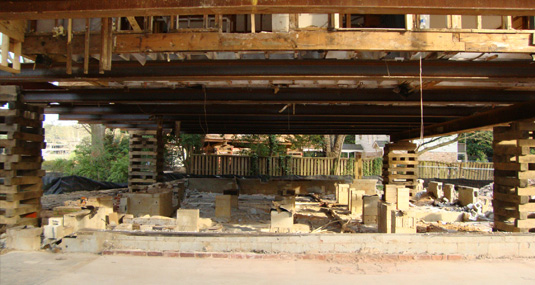
Cribbing beams support a house lifted in Atlanta, Georgia.

== Reasons for moving a structure ==
There are several reasons why a structure may be moved. For example, a redevelopment, such as urban regeneration, could cause a relocation. The buyer of a building may wish to move it to a new location, or the owner might sell the land that the building is on while keeping the building.

Another reason for the relocation of a building is to preserve it for historic interest. An example of such preservation is the Lin An Tai Historical House in Taiwan. Such a move could be made because a building is in danger at its present location.

On the island of Chiloe, in Chile, there is a tradition of moving houses if the original site is haunted. The house is placed on tree trunk rollers and dragged to the new location by oxen.

== Notable moves ==
=== Whole moves ===
London's Marble Arch (1847) was originally the entrance to the newly rebuilt Buckingham Palace. Following the expansion of Buckingham Palace, it was dismantled and rebuilt at a location near Hyde Park, with work being completed in 1851.

In order to save a single tree, Mustafa Kemal Atatürk, the first President of the Republic of Turkey, moved the future location of his summer house, the Yalova Atatürk Mansion, four meters to the east in 1936.

Between 12 October and 14 November 1930, the 8-story, 11,000 ton Indiana Bell building, the headquarters of the Indiana Bell telecommunications company, was shifted 52 feet south, rotated 90 degrees, then another 100 feet west. The city's telephone operations continued uninterrupted during the course of the building's relocation.

In the March of 1938 during Gorky street (now Tverskaya Street) in Moscow reconstruction couple of residential buildings were moved on the right side to make street thrice as wide. In 1939 Moscow City Council (Mossovet) were moved backwards together with the basement. Some other buildings were moved as street reconstruction developed (most notably six apartment buildings were moved by 19 meters and historical Eye Surgery Clinic moved and rotated by 92 degrees in 1940)..

In 1950 the Compania Telefónica de Mexico (Telephone Company of Mexico) building located in the city of Guadalajara was moved 11.8 meters without any interruption of telephone operations. Building weights 1,700 metric tons. The project started in May and ended in November 1950. The building movement itself took 5 days. Head of the project was Jorge Matute Remus, construction engineer and headmaster of the Universidad De Guadalajara at the time.

In September 1959 a 280 metres tall guyed radio mast of Europe 1 longwave transmitter in Felsberg-Berus, Germany was moved 102 metres northwards in order to realize a better radiation pattern of the transmitter. This was perhaps the tallest object ever moved on land

One of Europe's oldest dwelling houses in Exeter, United Kingdom, was relocated in 1961 to make way for a bypass road. The 15th century wooden framed building was moved on rails around 100 yards (91 m) up a 1:10 hill, and became known as The House That Moved.

The Cudecom Building in Bogotá, Colombia (Weight 7,000 Metric Tons, Distance Moved: 95 Feet); was moved in October 1974 using Steel Rollers. The 8 story building was moved westward to build an avenue. The move of the Cudecom Building was in the Guinness Book of World Records for 30 years. Moving Cudecom Building Part 1 Moving Cudecom Building Part 2

The Gem Theatre and Century Theatre, both housed within the same building in Detroit, were moved five blocks on wheels to its new location at 333 Madison Avenue on 16 October 1997, because of the development of the Comerica Park area when it became home of the Detroit Tigers. At a distance of 563 meters (1,847 feet) it is the furthest known relocation of a sizable building setting a world record by Expert House Movers, LLC.

Structure relocation was common in the 1980s in Romania because of Ceausescu's building projects. Many buildings, including churches and older apartment blocks used to be relocated using hydraulics. One of the most notable feats achieved was on 27 May 1987, when a whole apartment block weighing 7600 Tonnes was split in half and completely relocated, with people left inside, with no damage whatsoever. As of this day the building still stands, and it was one of the most challenging relocations in the whole world. Engineer Eugeniu Iordachescu moved 29 buildings (from which 13 were churches) during his career. (https://ro.wikipedia.org/wiki/Mutarea_cl%C4%83dirilor_%C8%99i_structurilor)

As part of the Minnesota Shubert Performing Arts and Education Center development, the Shubert Theatre was moved between 9 February 1999 and 21 February 1999. The 2,638 tonne (2,596 short ton) building was moved three city blocks and is the heaviest recorded building move done on wheels.

The 850 tonne Belle Tout Lighthouse was built in 1831 near the edge of the cliff on the next headland west from Beachy Head, East Sussex, England. It was moved more than 17 metres (56 feet) further inland in 1999 due to cliff erosion. It was pushed by four hydraulic jacks along four steel and concrete beams to a new site that was designed specifically to allow for possible future relocations.

In 1999, the 208-foot (63 m) tall, 2540-tonne Cape Hatteras Lighthouse was moved 2,900 feet (880 m) to protect it from being undermined by beach erosion. When the North Carolina lighthouse was built in 1870, it was over 1,500 feet (460 m) from the sea, but by 1935 the beach had eroded and the waves were only 100 feet (30 m) away. Starting in 1930, many efforts to halt the erosion were attempted, including adding over a million cubic yards of loose sand, massive sandbags, and steel and concrete walls. After nearly 70 years it became apparent that fighting the erosion was a never-ending battle, and the decision was made to move the lighthouse away from the sea.

The 3,200-year-old Statue of Ramesses II in Cairo was moved on 25 August 2006 from Ramses Square to a new museum site. The statue was slowly being damaged by pollution and was in an area where it was difficult for people to visit. The move of the statue, which measures 11 metres (36 feet) high and weighs around 83 tonnes (91 short tons) was broadcast live on Egyptian television. Transported whole on the back of two trucks, the statue had previously been cut into eight pieces when it was moved from its excavation site in the mid-1950s.

In June 2008, Hamilton Grange National Memorial, the 1802 home of Alexander Hamilton in New York City, was relocated from a cramped lot on Convent Avenue to a more spacious setting facing West 141st Street in nearby St. Nicholas Park, where it is currently undergoing a complete restoration. It is actually the second time the 298-ton mansion has been moved. In 1889, it was relocated from its original site on West 143rd Street to a church's property two blocks away.

The Nathaniel Lieb House (1969), by architect Robert Venturi, was moved by barge from Long Beach Island, New Jersey to Glen Cove, New York in 2009.

In April 2013, due to construction works on Fuzuli Street the House of famous Baku millionaire, Isa bey Hajinski, in Baku (Azerbaijan), which was built in 1908, was moved 10 m to protect it as historical and architectural monument. The weight of this building is 18,000 tonnes. It was the heaviest building in the world ever moved.

The William Walker House, built circa 1904, was relocated 500 feet when the new owner, Thomas Tull, decided to preserve the home instead of demolishing it. The move took place in August 2016. The house was designed by architects Longfellow, Alden & Harlow.

On 21 December 2016 part of the Belleview-Biltmore Hotel was relocated and placed on a new foundation where it will be converted into an inn with event space, an ice cream parlor, and a history room.

Beginning in 1983, Shipcarpenter Square in Lewes, Delaware, is a historic residential development in which entire homes from centuries past were re-located to a common residential neighborhood. The development consists of approximately 40 homes that were relocated whole.

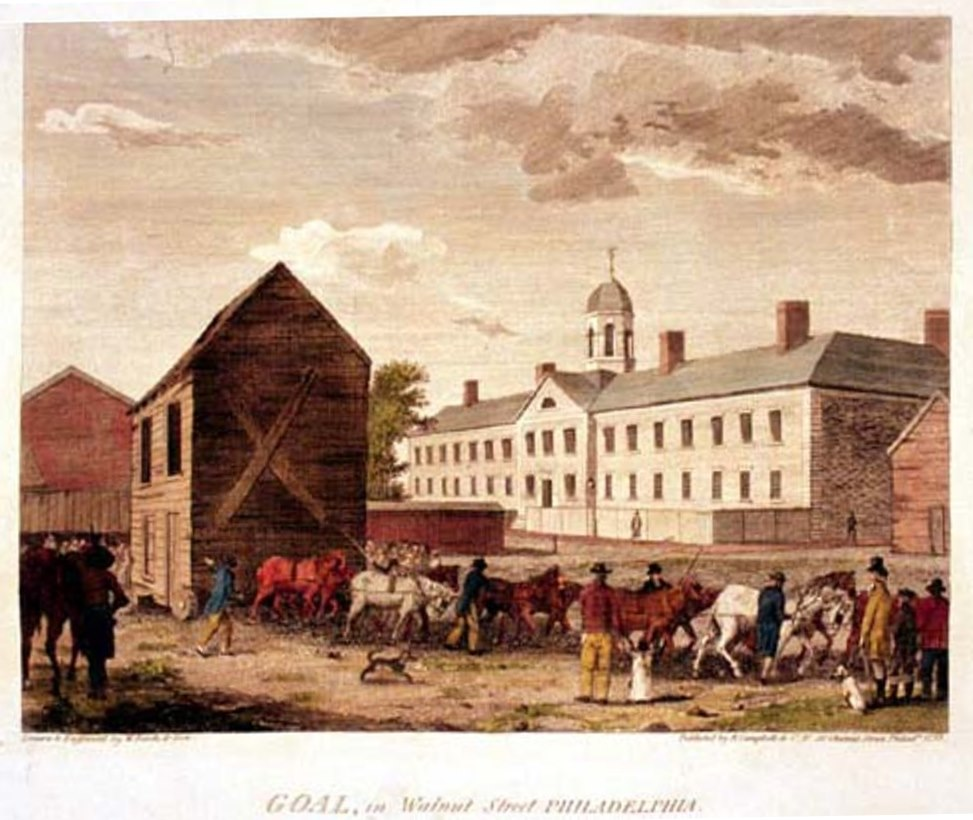
Moving a building, Philadelphia, Pennsylvania, 1799

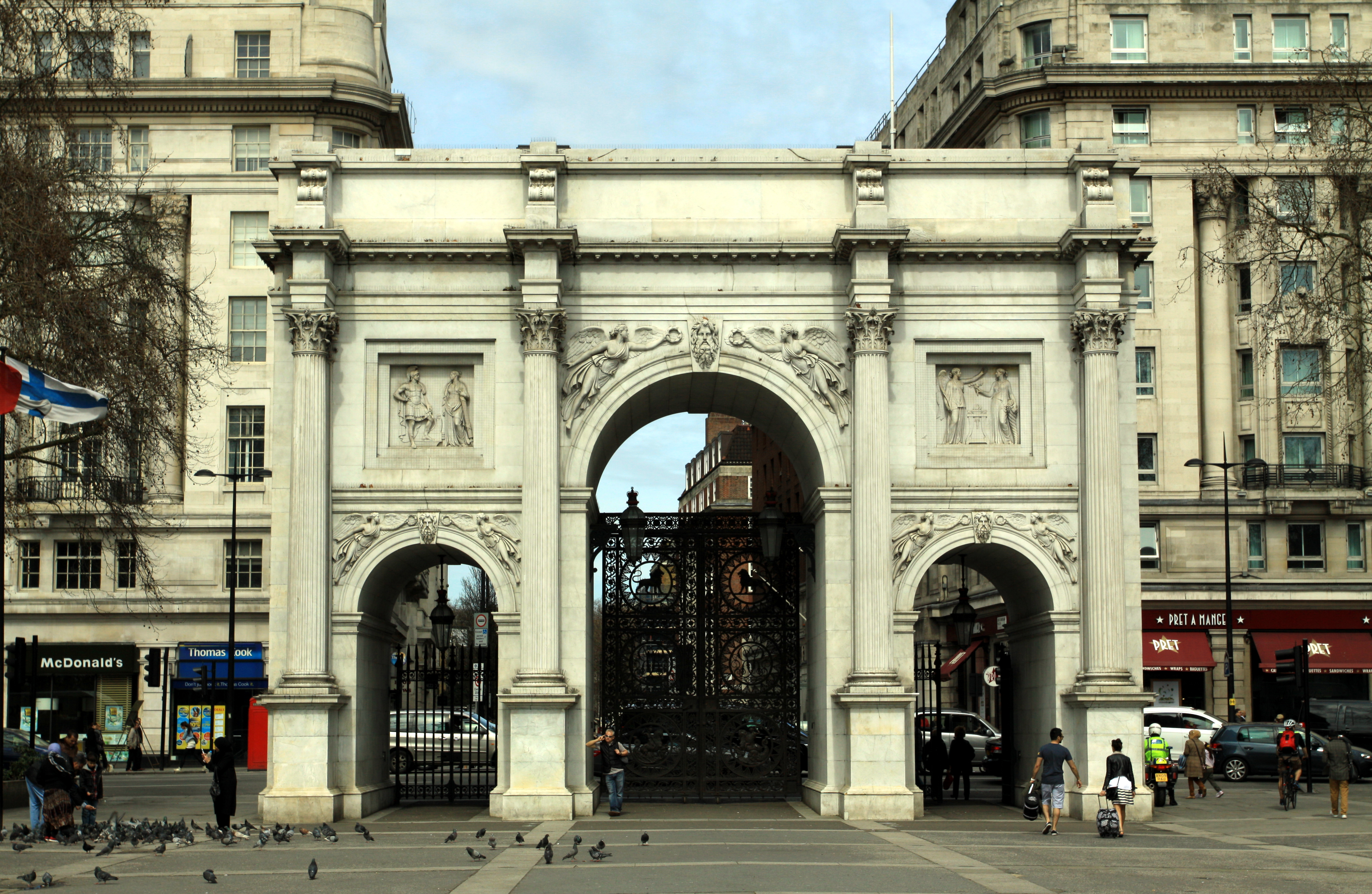
Marble Arch in London, England, moved from Buckingham Palace to Hyde Park in 1851

Relocation of old Villa Haux in Ebingen, Germany, 1907

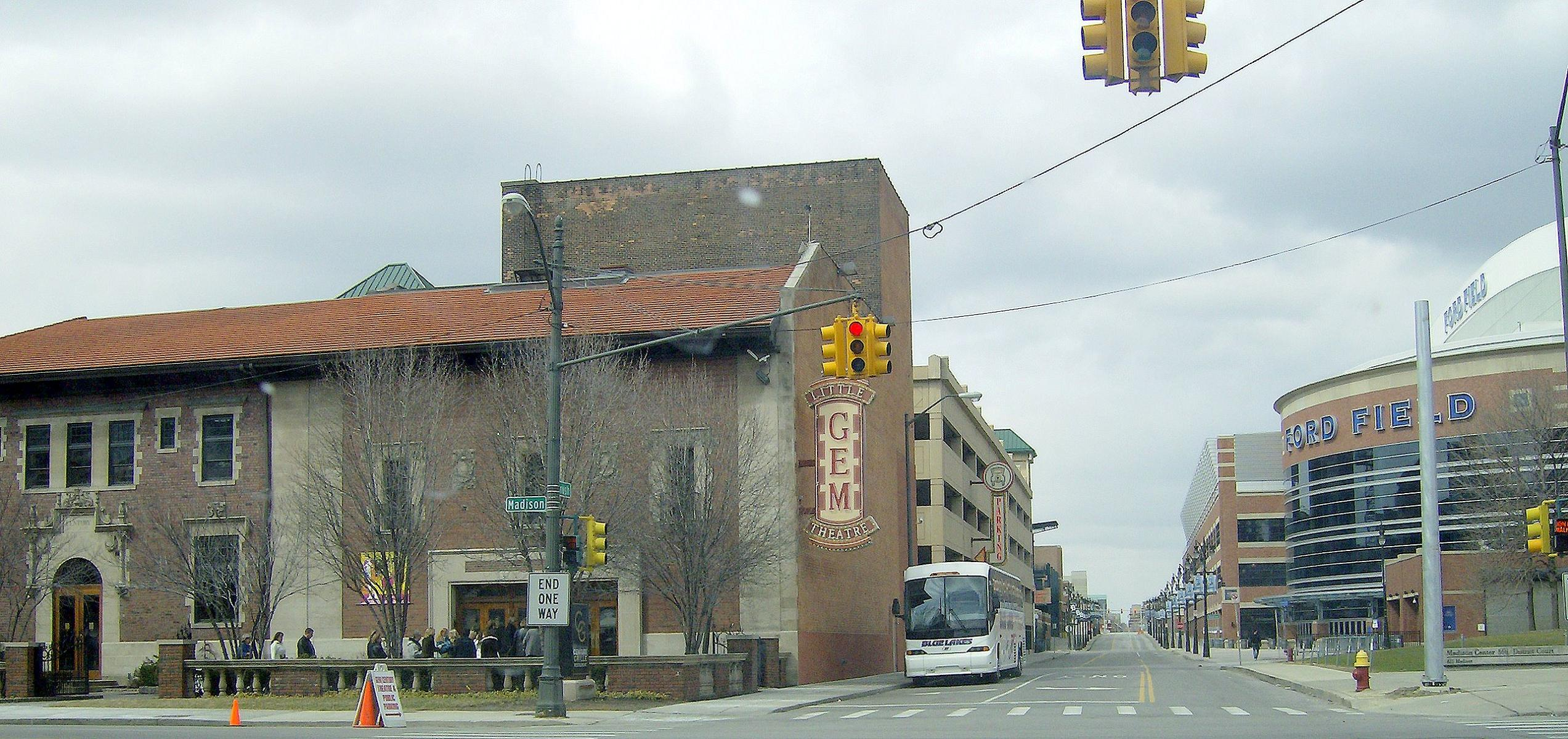
Gem Theatre, Detroit, Michigan, moved 1997

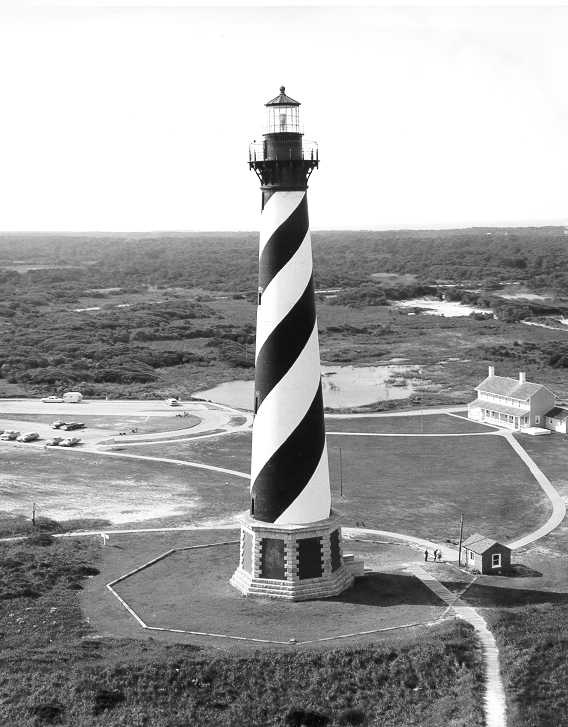
Cape Hatteras Lighthouse, moved 1999

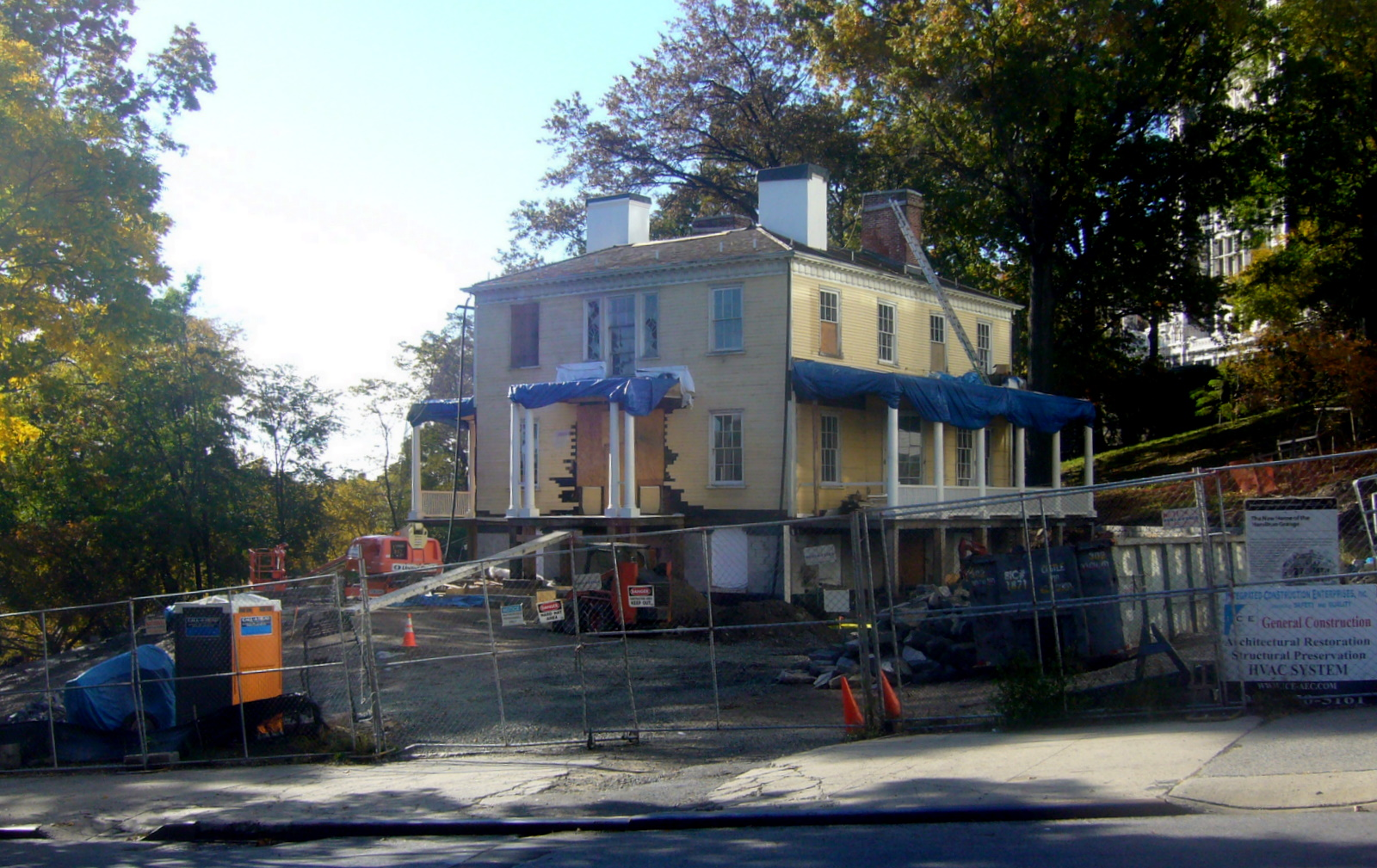
Alexander Hamilton's house, "The Grange", being installed in St. Nicholas Park, 2008

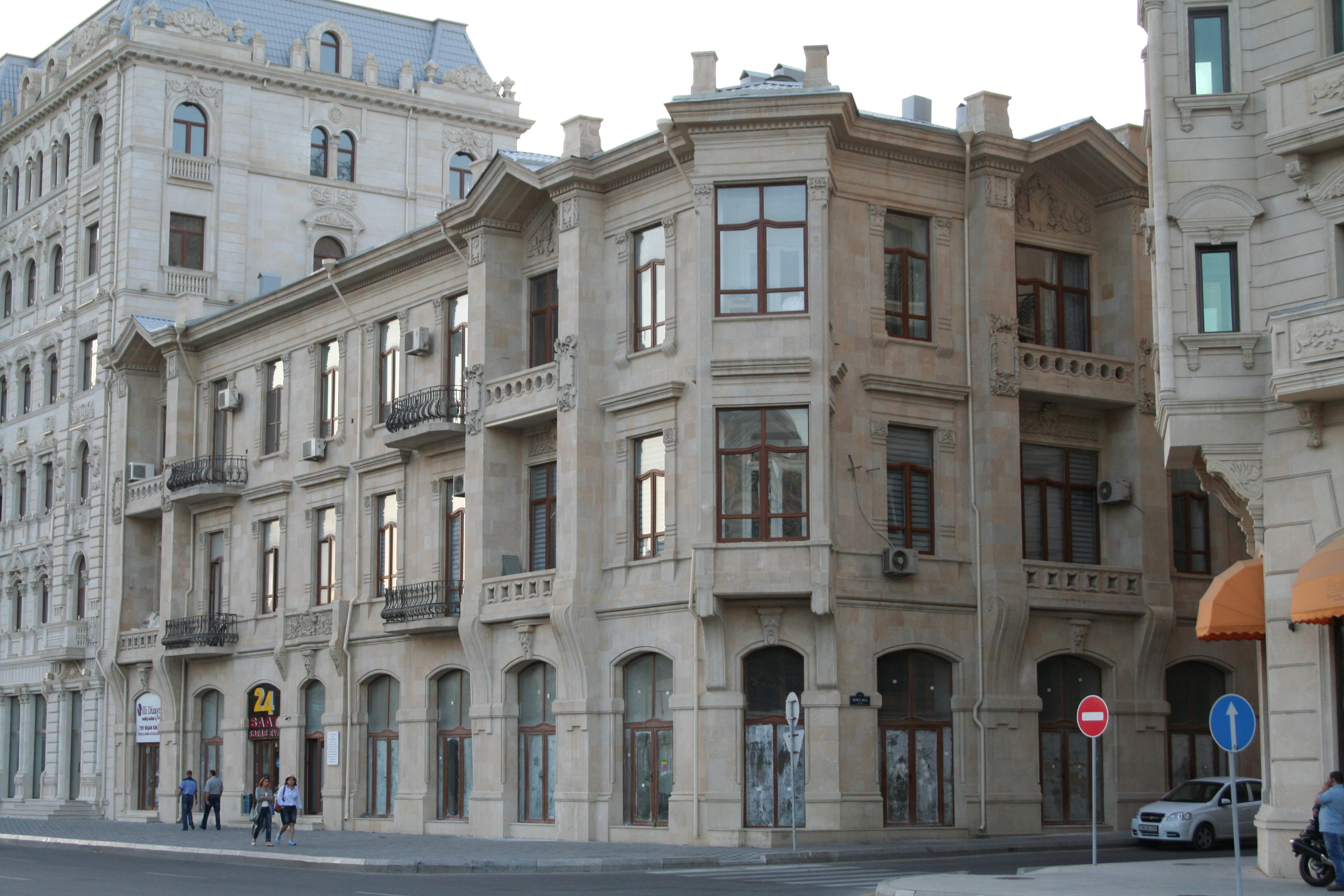
House of Isa bey Hajinski in Baku, Azerbaijan, moved 2013

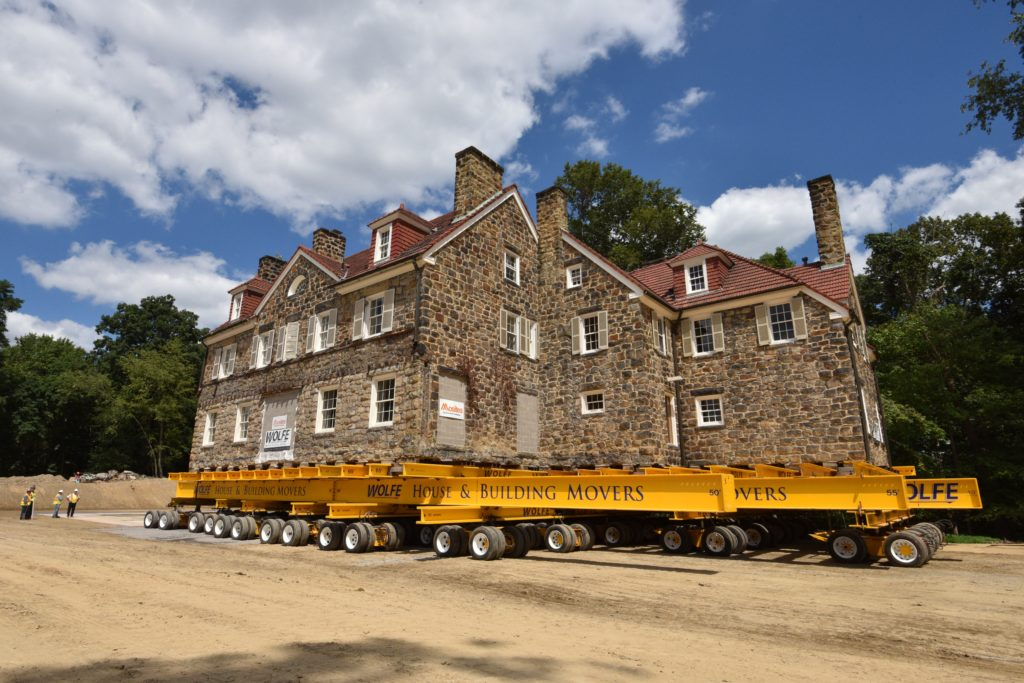
The William Walker House being moved in Edgeworth, Pennsylvania (August 2016)

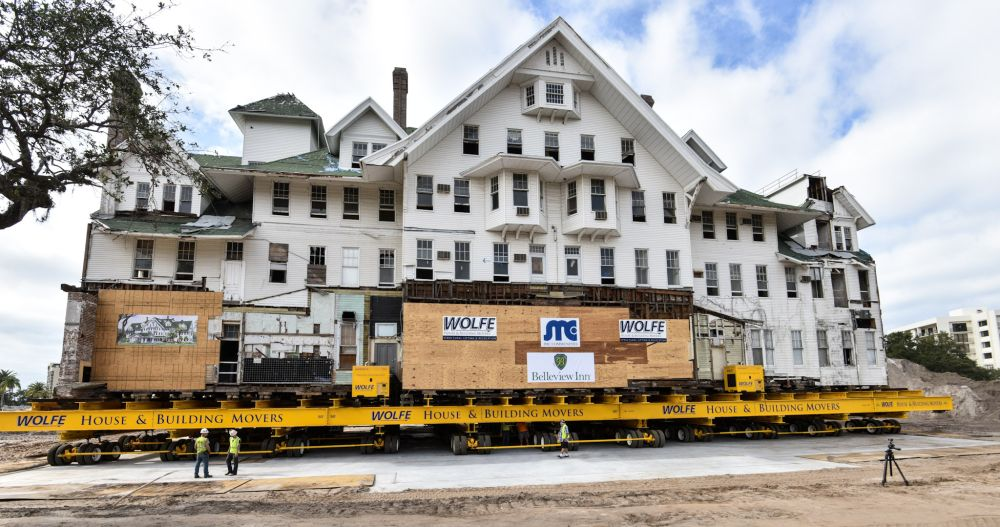
Belleview-Biltmore Hotel being moved 230 feet on 21 December 2016 in Belleair, Florida

=== Reassembly moves ===
The Warder Mansion, the only surviving Washington, D.C. building by architect H. H. Richardson, was saved from demolition in 1923 by George Oakley Totten Jr. Totten bought the exterior stone – except the main doorway, which reportedly went to the Smithsonian Institution – and much of the interior woodwork, and transported it, piece by piece, in his Model T Ford. He reassembled the building about 1.5 miles north of its original site and converted it into an apartment house.

In 1925, Thomas C. Williams Jr. bought a 15th-century Tudor manor house, Agecroft Hall, which stood by the River Irwell in Pendlebury, England. The hall was disassembled, crated and transported to Richmond, Virginia, where it was reassembled as the centrepiece of a Tudor estate on the banks of the James River. The 16th-century Warwick Priory in Warwick, England was bought by Alexander and Virginia Weddell in 1926 and relocated in the same manner. Architect Henry G. Morse oversaw both moves. He designed additions to the reassembled priory, inspired by Sulgrave Manor and Wormleighton Manor. The expanded building was renamed Virginia House, and stands next door to Agecroft Hall.

Newspaper magnate William Randolph Hearst purchased and attempted to relocate two Cistercian monasteries during his travels in Spain, but neither was completed during his lifetime. The first was built about 1141 and found abandoned by Hearst in 1925. He purchased the ruin and attempted to ship it to his home in California, San Simeon. The crates, however, were detained by customs officials in New York City, and due to his deteriorating finances during the Great Depression, Hearst was unable to complete the shipment. The stones were purchased in 1951 and reassembled in Florida as a tourist attraction. In 1964, the building was purchased by a local Episcopal diocese and restored to its original purpose as the Church of St. Bernard de Clairvaux.

Hearst's second attempt at relocating a monastery was in 1931 when he found the closed Santa Maria de Ovila monastery, built around 1200. He purchased the structure, disassembled it and successfully shipped it to San Francisco, but was unable to rebuild the monastery. Hearst eventually gave the stones to the city of San Francisco, where they sat for decades in Golden Gate Park. Eventually, some of the stones were acquired by the Abbey of New Clairvaux in Vina, California, where they are currently being reconstructed; others are now being used as decorative accents in the San Francisco Botanical Garden.

Abu Simbel is an archaeological site comprising two massive rock temples completed in 1244 BCE, on the western bank of the Nile in southern Egypt. Construction of the Aswan High Dam would have submerged the temples beneath the waters of Lake Nasser. In 1959, an international donation campaign began to save the monuments of Nubia: the southernmost relics of this ancient human civilization. The salvage of the Abu Simbel temples began in 1964, and cost US$80 million. Between 1964 and 1968, the entire site was cut into large blocks, dismantled and reassembled in a new location – 65 m higher and 200 m back from the river, in what many consider one of the greatest feats of archaeological engineering. Today, thousands of tourists visit the temples daily. Guarded convoys of buses and cars depart twice a day from Aswan, the nearest city. Many visitors also arrive by plane, at an airfield that was specially constructed for the temple complex.

On 18 April 1968, John Rennie's London Bridge (which had replaced the original bridge in 1831) was sold to the American entrepreneur Robert P. McCulloch of McCulloch Oil for the sum of $2,460,000. The bridge was reconstructed at Lake Havasu City, Arizona, and opened on 10 October 1971. Not all of the bridge was transported to America, as some were kept behind in lieu of tax duties. The version of London Bridge that was rebuilt at Lake Havasu consists of a concrete frame with stones from the old (but not the original) London Bridge used as cladding. It spans a canal that leads from Lake Havasu to Thomson Bay, and forms the centrepiece of a theme park in the English style, complete with mock-Tudor shopping mall. The bridge has become one of Arizona's biggest tourist attractions.

The Old Wellington Inn (1552) and Sinclair's Oyster Bar, two of Manchester, England's oldest buildings, dating from the 16th century and 17th century respectively, had their foundations raised 4 feet 9 inches (1.45 m) when the Shambles Square marketplace was refurbished in the 1960s. They were in close proximity to the 1996 Manchester bombing. As part of the rebuilding, they were disassembled and moved 100 m north to the new Shambles Square, next to Manchester Cathedral. Originally the two buildings comprised a single row, but they were rebuilt 90 degrees to each other and connected by new construction.

The formerly Grade-I Listed Murray House in Hong Kong (built 1844) was dismantled in 1982 to make way for the Bank of China Tower. It was rebuilt brick-by-brick at Stanley in 2000. The relocation process, nonetheless, was said to have failed to meet 'the international standard of preservation'. Certain architectural features, such as the chimneys and stone columns were lost and were replaced with features taken from other contemporary buildings. Much of the structure, furthermore, was reconstructed to be held up by an added steel-and-concrete core that which was not representative of how it once existed. The Grade-I listed status has thus since been withdrawn.

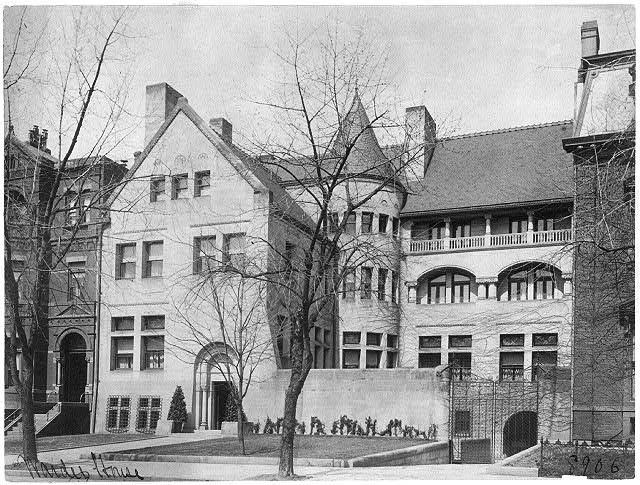
Warder Mansion (1887), Washington, D.C., moved about 1.5 miles, 1923–25

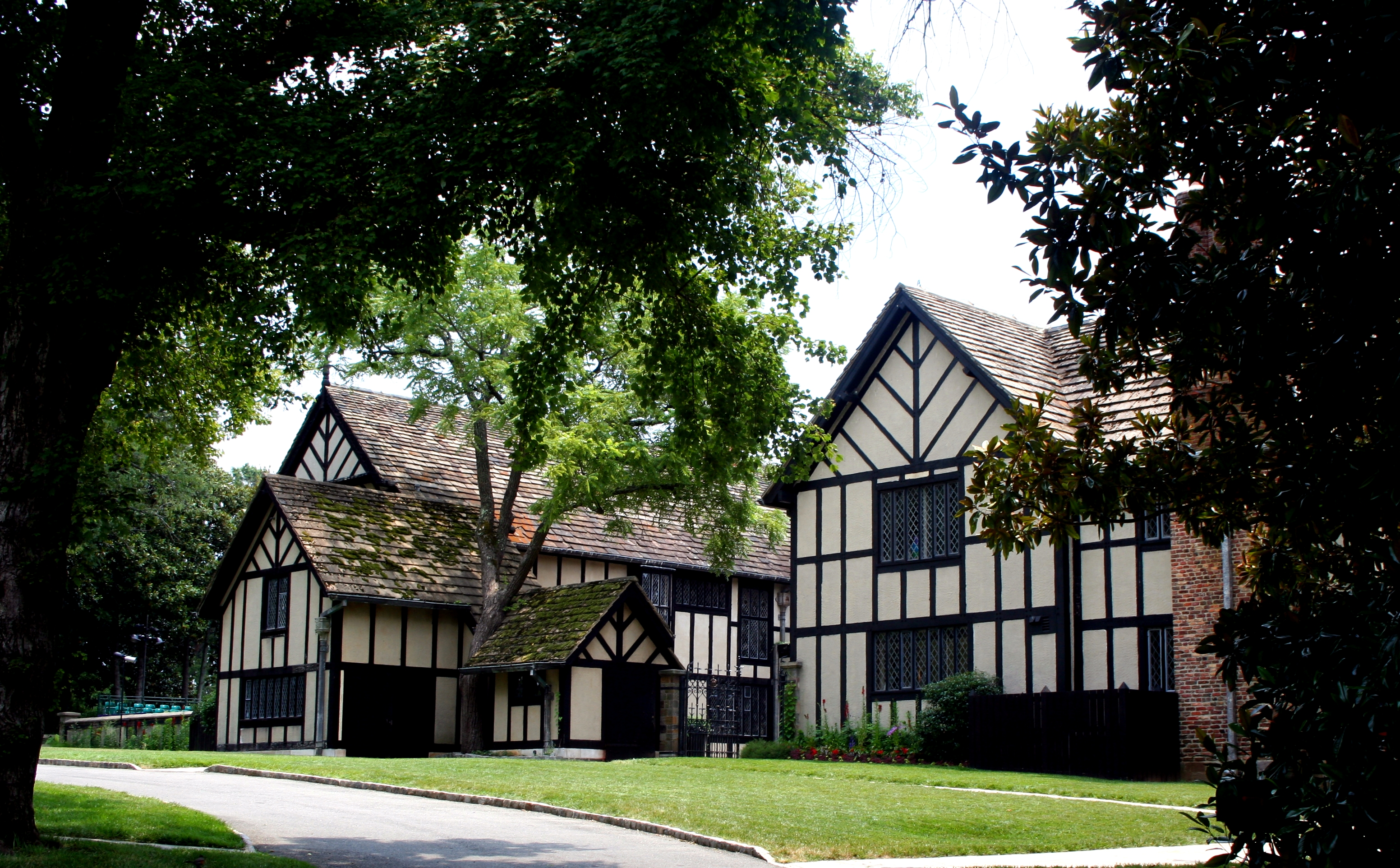
Agecroft Hall (c. 1500), moved from Pendlebury, England to Richmond, Virginia, 1925–26

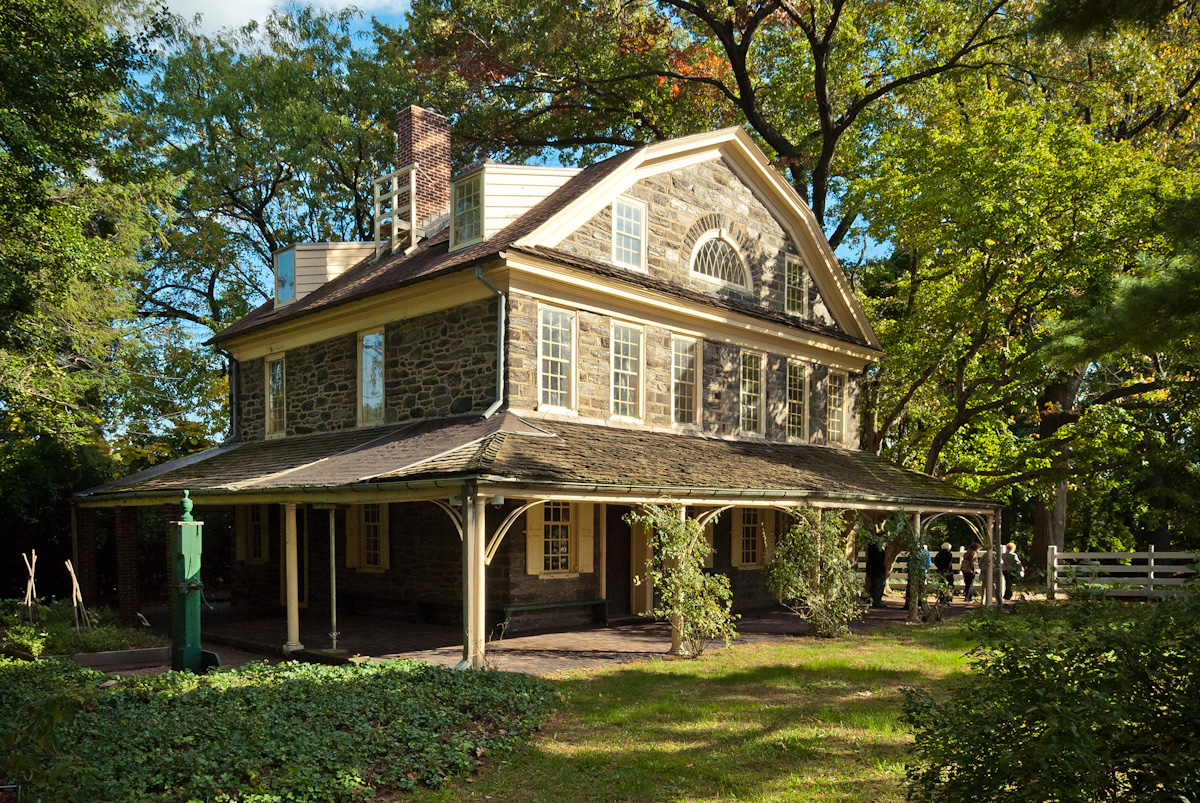
Cedar Grove (1746), moved from the Frankford section of Philadelphia, Pennsylvania to Fairmount Park, 1926–28

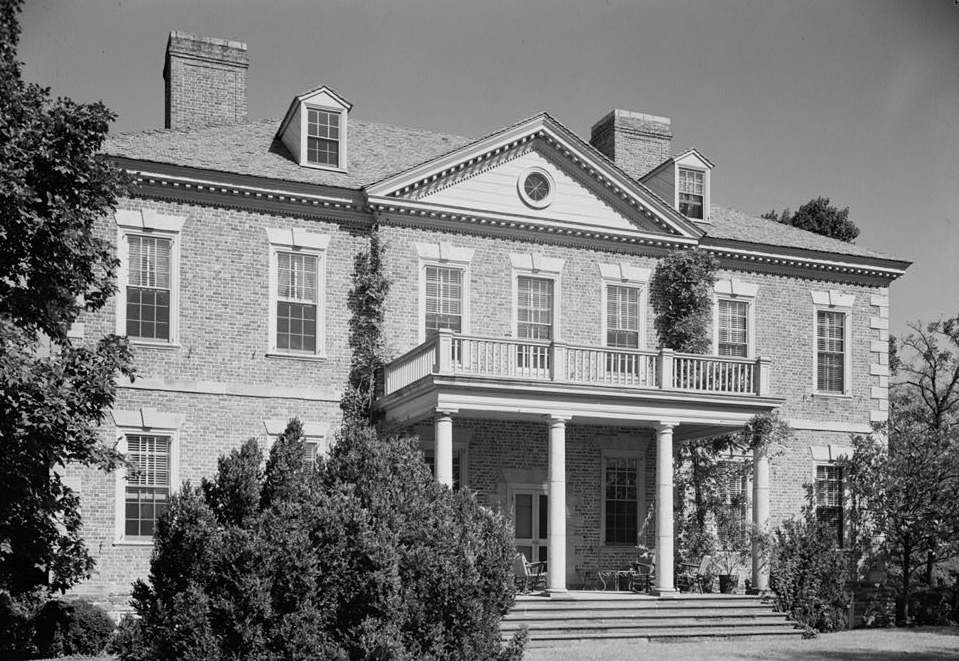
Rocky Mills (c. 1750), moved from outside Ashland, Virginia to Richmond, Virginia, 1928

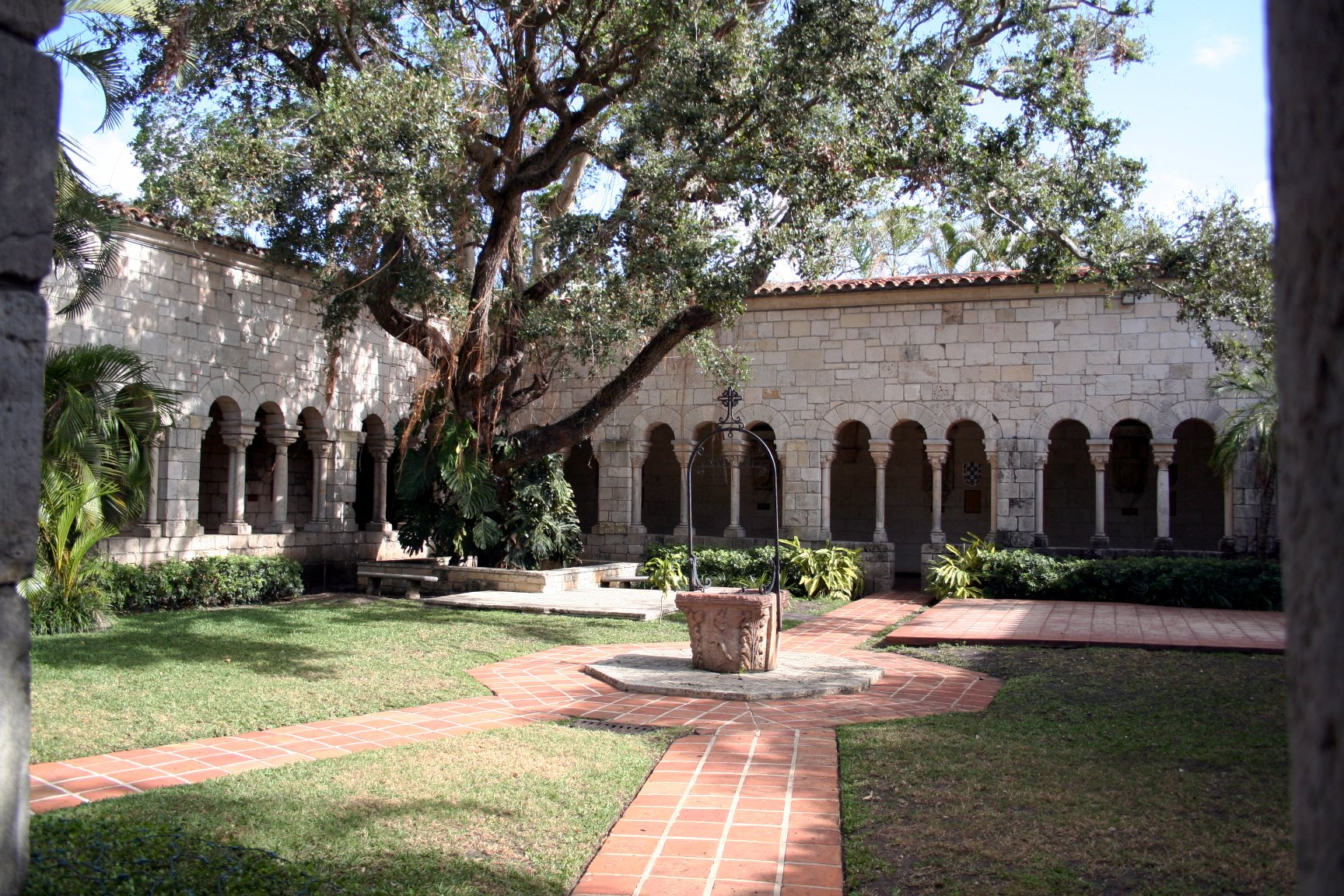
Church of St. Bernard de Clairvaux (1133–41), North Miami Beach, Florida. Disassembled in Spain, 1920s; reassembled in Florida, 1950s.

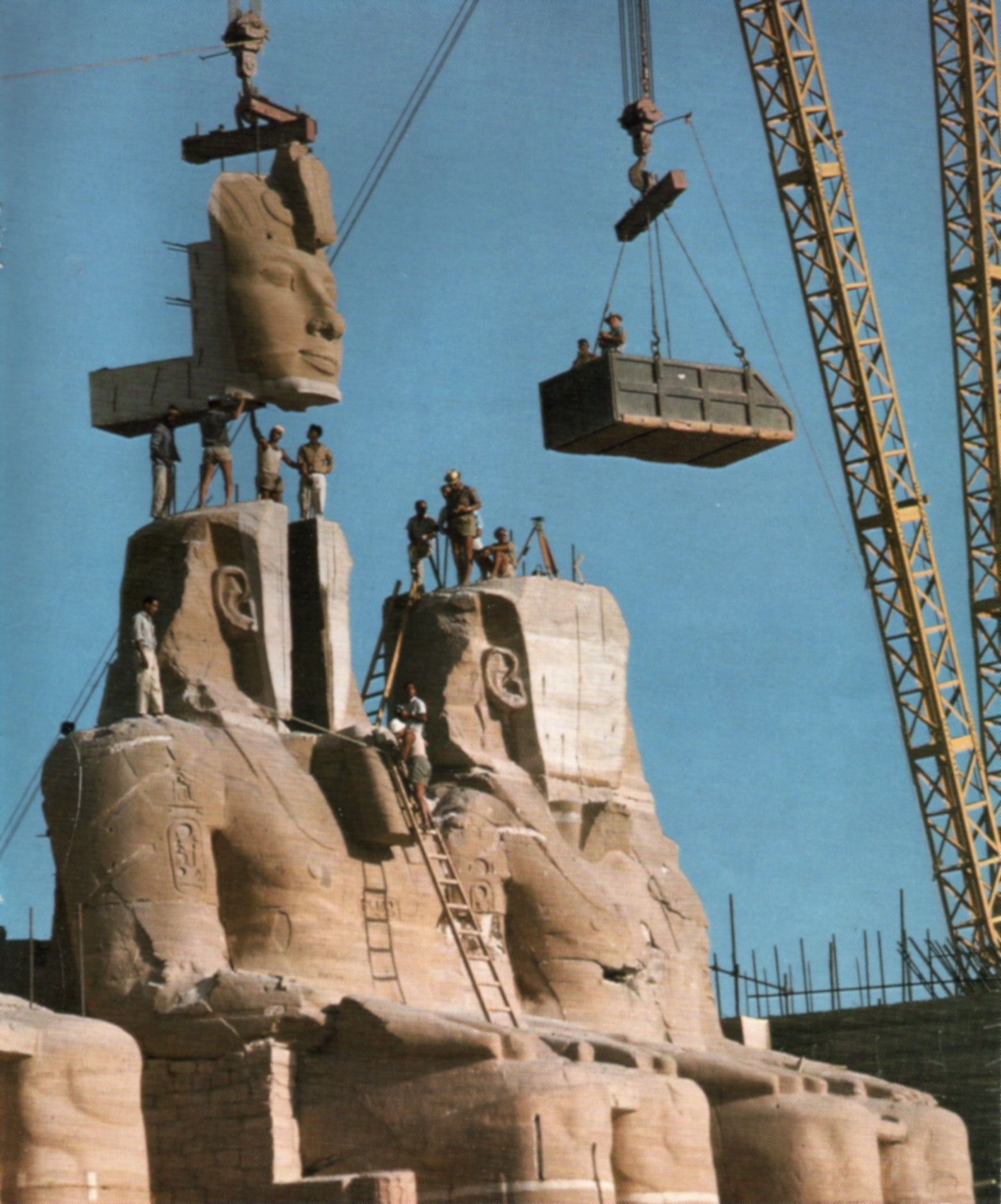
Reassembling the Pharaoh Ramesses II statues at the Great Temple of Abu Simbel, Egypt, late-1960s

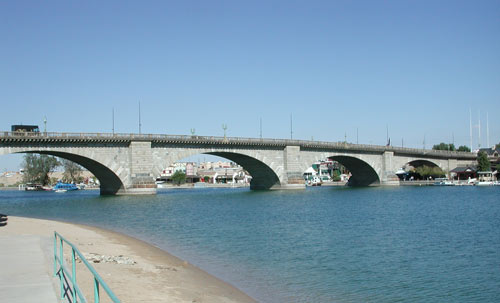
London Bridge (1831), moved from London, England to Lake Havasu City, Arizona, 1968–71

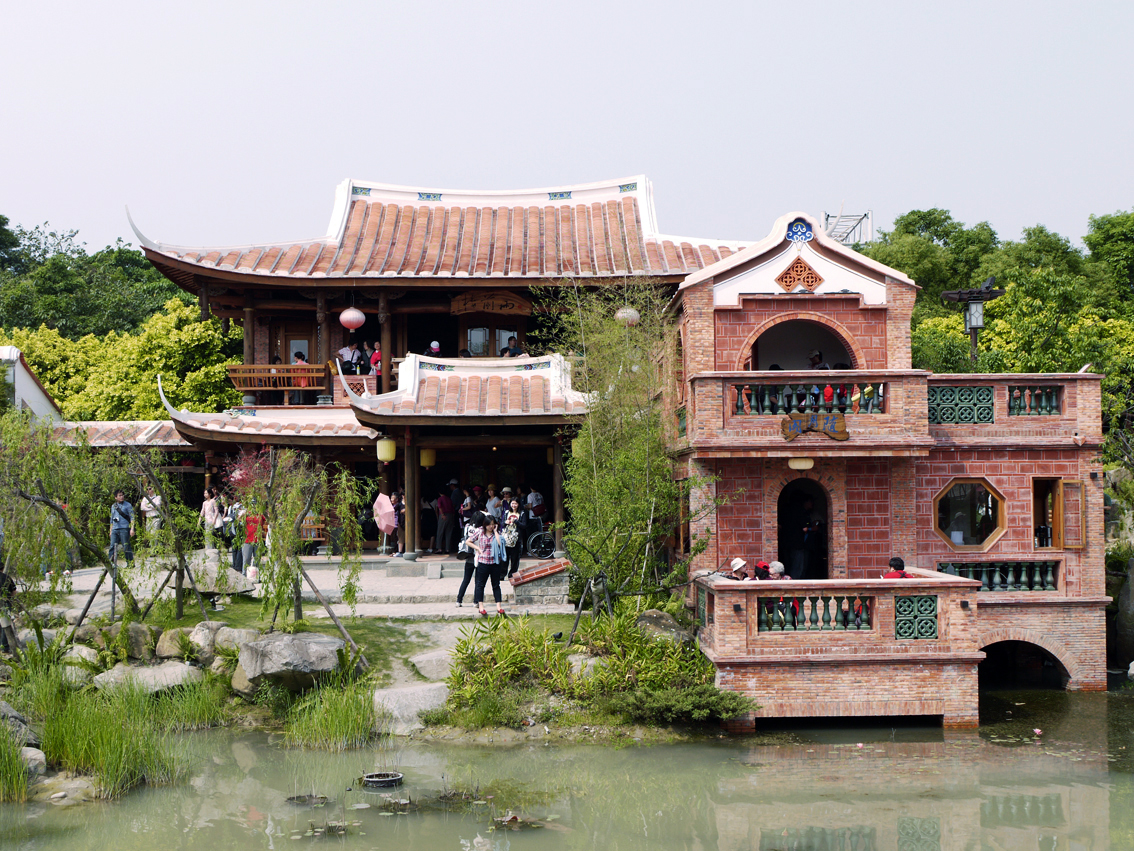
Lin An Tai Historical House (1756), Taipei, Taiwan. Moved for highway construction in the 1990s.

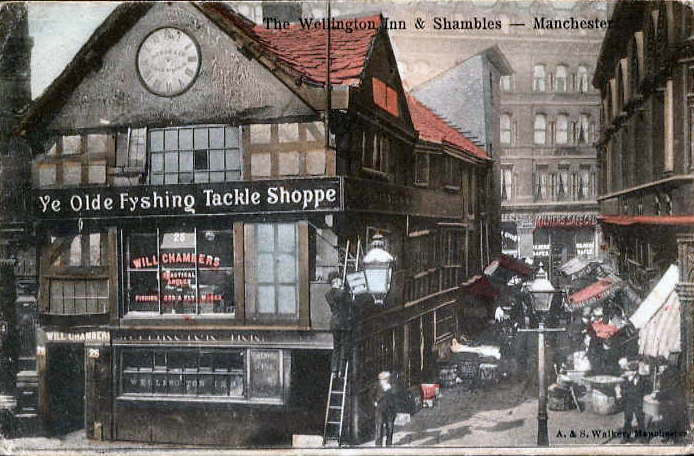
The Old Wellington Inn (1552) and Shambles Square, Manchester, England, moved 1999

== Museum collections ==
Several museums, particularly open-air museums, move historic buildings into their surroundings, with some dedicated to showing what life was like in previous centuries called living history.

Museums that have transported and reconstructed old buildings and structures include:

- Avoncroft Museum of Historic Buildings, Bromsgrove, Worcestershire, England; centered on a collection of buildings which had to be relocated from their original sites and restored, along with a fully functioning windmill, a 1940s prefab, and the UK national collection of telephone kiosks.
- Beamish Museum, Stanley, County Durham, England; shows what life was like in a typical northern town in the early 20th century.
- Black Country Living Museum, Dudley, West Midlands, England; forty-two separate displays, including houses, shops and public buildings rebuilt to create a single early 20th-century street.
- The Chiltern Open Air Museum in buckinghamshire, England, containing examples of regional vernacular buildings such as cottages and farmhouses.
- The Cloisters, New York City, a branch of the Metropolitan Museum of Art dedicated to the art and architecture of the European Middle Ages.
- Greenfield Village (The Henry Ford Museum), Dearborn, Michigan, which contains many historically significant buildings from around the United States, as well as a 17th-century farm from the Cotswolds, England.
- Kirkland Museum of Fine & Decorative Art, Denver, Colorado, moved painter Vance Kirkland's studio & art school building (built 1910–1911 for Henry Read's Students' School of Art) to its new location eight blocks west at 12th & Bannock in Denver on 6 November 2016.
- Landis Valley Museum, Lancaster, Pennsylvania, a collection of Pennsylvania German houses and early industrial buildings.
- Lillian & Albert Small Capital Jewish Museum in Washington, D.C. features the historic Adas Israel Synagogue that was moved to its present location in 2019 with a new museum built around it.
- History Park at Kelley Park, San Jose, California, features historic city buildings that have been moved from their original locations. The History Park is an indoor/outdoor museum, arranged to replicate a small United States town from the 19th century with both original and historically accurate recreations of architecturally significant buildings.
- Old Sturbridge Village, Sturbridge, Massachusetts, a recreated New England village with 40 structures.
- Peabody Essex Museum, Salem, Massachusetts, a museum which features some relocated historic buildings, including Yin Yu Tang, a late Qing dynasty merchant's house from southwestern China.
- The St Fagans National History Museum near Cardiff, Wales consists almost entirely of relocated buildings from across Wales, aiming to chronicle the lifestyle, culture, and architecture of the Welsh people.
- Shelburne Museum, Shelburne, Vermont, a village of 25 relocated historic buildings and the 220-foot steamboat Ticonderoga.
- Strawbery Banke, Portsmouth, New Hampshire, a historic seaport neighborhood museum. Although most of the Colonial and Federal style buildings are in situ, some were moved for preservation.
- Woodman Institute, Dover, New Hampshire, features the 1675 William Damm Garrison House, New Hampshire's oldest intact garrison house, relocated to the museum's grounds in 1915 from elsewhere in the city.
- Weald and Downland Open Air Museum, Singleton, Sussex, England, has almost 50 relocated historic buildings from the South East dating from between the 12th century to 19th century.
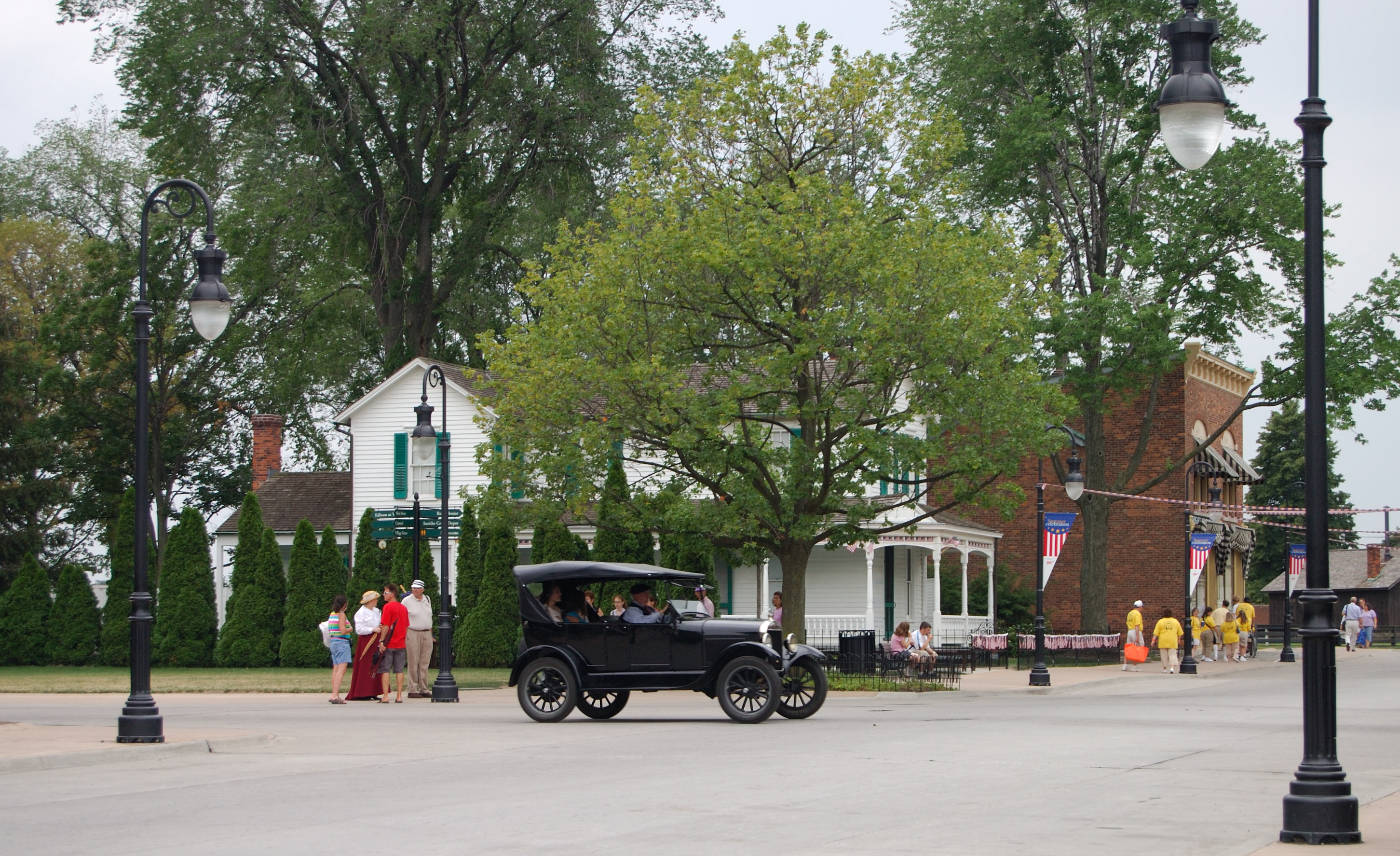
Wright Brothers house and bicycle shop. Relocated from Dayton, Ohio to Greenfield Village, Dearborn, Michigan.

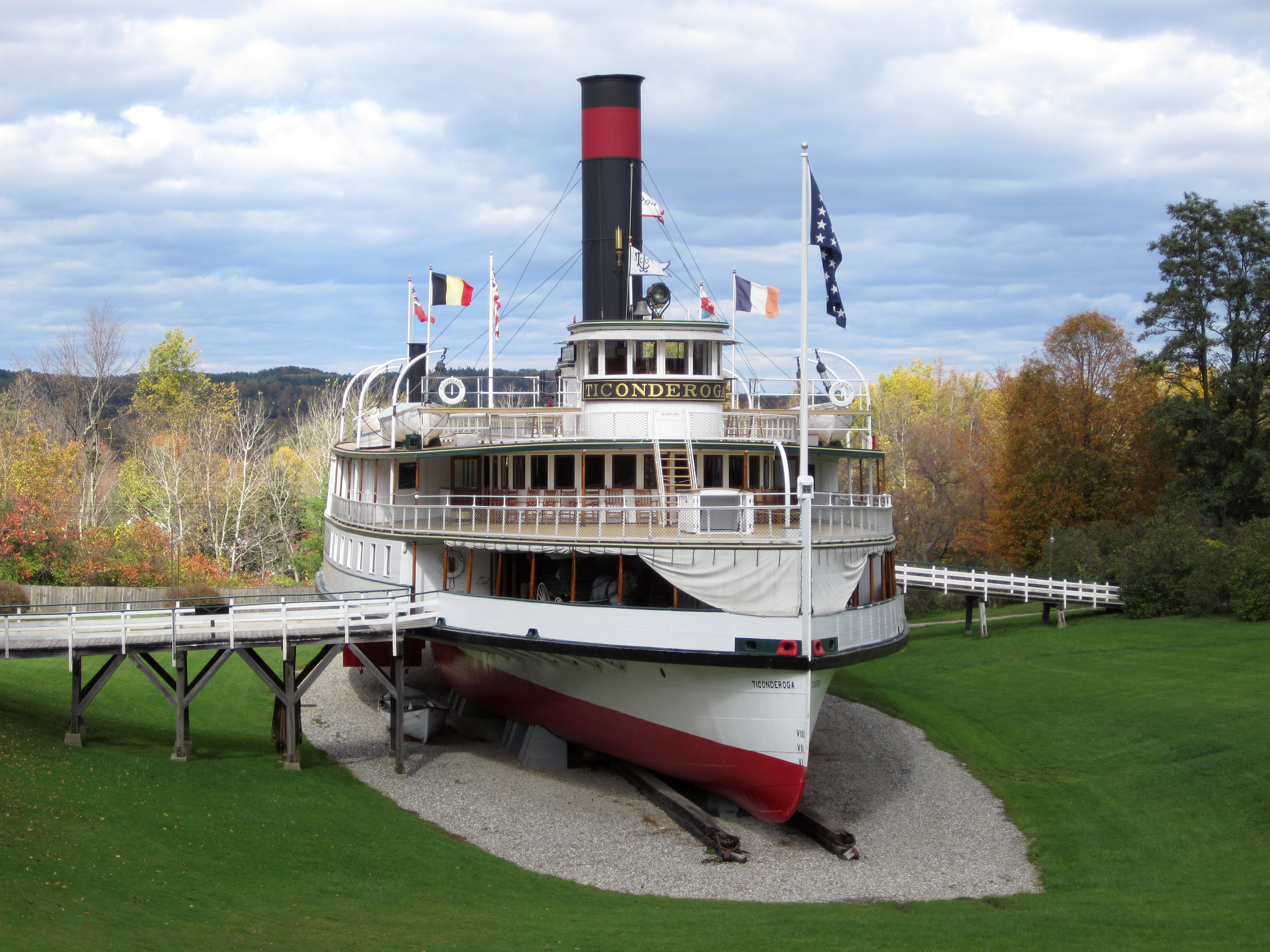
Steamboat Ticonderoga, Shelburne Museum, Shelburne, Vermont

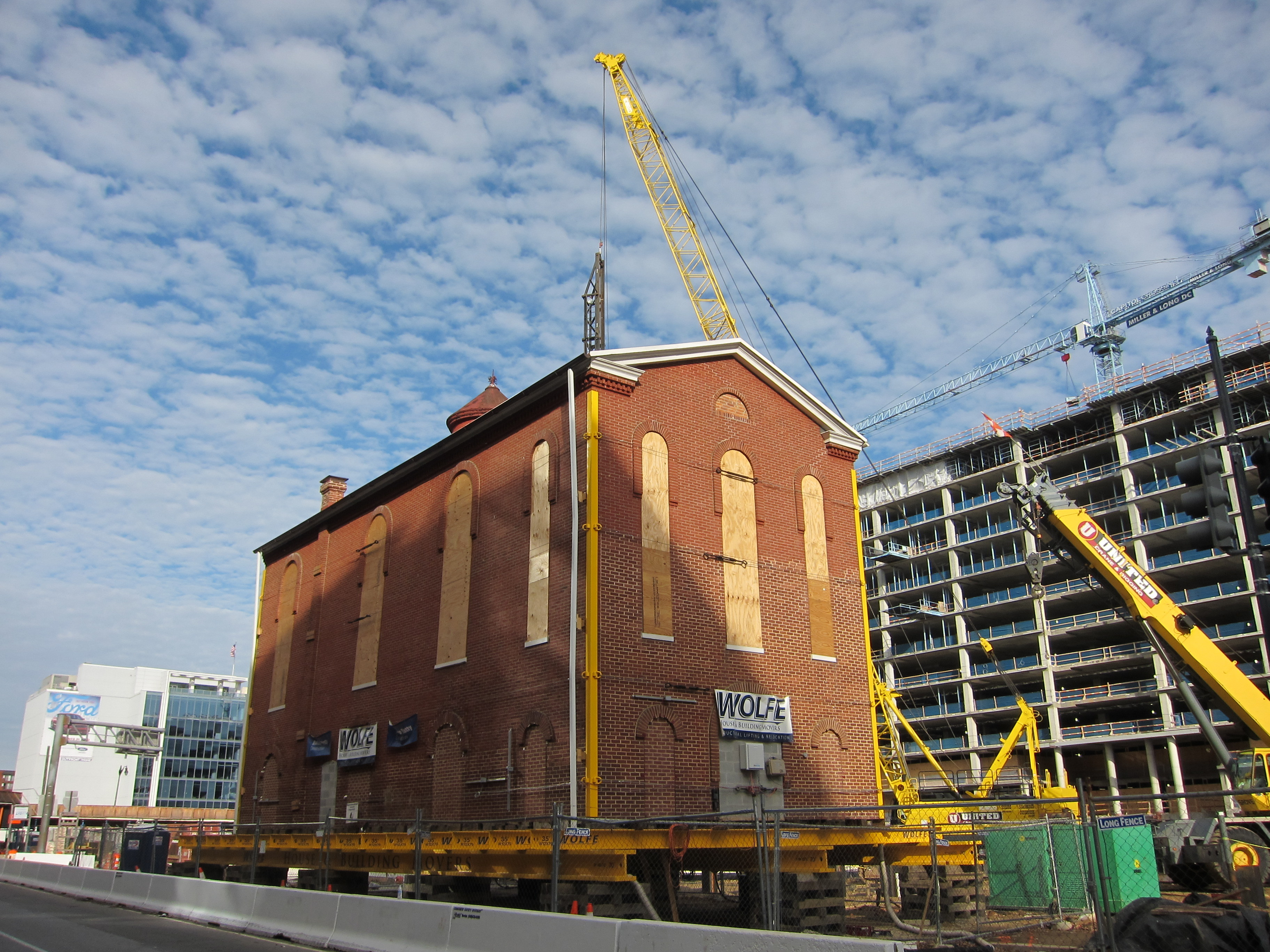
The Adas Israel Synagogue being prepared to be relocated to form part of the Lillian & Albert Small Capital Jewish Museum in Washington, D.C.

== Relocation of towers ==
In the past, it was not uncommon that radio towers, free-standing as well as guyed, were dismantled and rebuilt at another site. In some cases, they were rebuilt just a few metres away from their original site, but in others far away from their original site. In first case, these towers were nearly all part of a directional antenna system for long- and medium-wave for which the regulations of directional patterns were changed and the best way to fulfill it, was to build either a new tower or to dismantle one tower and to rebuild it on the new site. It was also done that a tower was dismantled and then used for the upper parts of a new radio tower. This was done for example with the masts at Sender Donebach in 1982 and with the wooden tower of Transmitter Ismaning in 1934. After World War II some radio towers in former East Germany were dismantled by Soviet occupants and rebuilt in former Soviet Union, the most famous example herefore is Goliath transmitter. It is also common that electricity pylons are dismantled and rebuilt at a new site. Also small observation towers built of steel were sometimes dismantled for renovation and afterwards rebuilt.

The tallest structure ever relocated is BREN Tower. In 1959 a 280-metre-tall radio mast was relocated at Felsberg-Berus without dismantling.

== Financing building relocation ==
Although smaller projects are usually paid for in cash, larger projects such as the relocation of a house to a new site are typically financed by banks. Finance is often a major problem faced by project managers as the house needs to be paid for prior to leaving its current site, but the lender for the project cannot take security over the house until it is complete and on the new site. This creates a short-term cashflow problem that unhinges many projects.

== See also ==
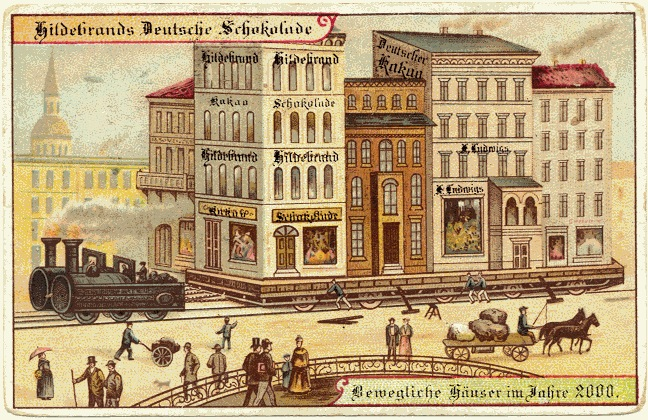
On 1900 card

- Lloyd's building
- Parachute Jump, Coney Island, Brooklyn, New York
- Hunting Island Light
- Cape Canaveral Light
- Baltic Exchange
- Cooks' Cottage
- BREN Tower
- Goliath transmitter
- Longwave transmitter Europe 1
- Bodenseesender
- Category:Relocated buildings and structures
- Big Duck
