= John Sullivan House =

Historic house in New Hampshire, United States

- Gen. John Sullivan House
- U.S. National Register of Historic Places
- U.S. National Historic Landmark
- U.S. Historic district – Contributing property
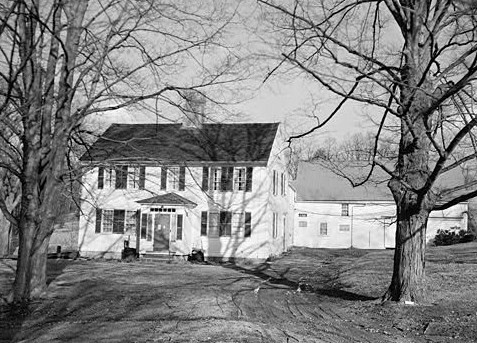
- General John Sullivan House in 1937

- Location within New Hampshire Location within the United States
- Location: 21 Newmarket Road, Durham, New Hampshire
- Coordinates: 43°7′48″N 70°55′5″W
- Area: 2 acres (0.81 ha)
- Built: 1764
- Part of: Durham Historic District (ID80000308)
- NRHP reference No.: 72000089

Significant dates
- Added to NRHP: November 28, 1972
- Designated NHL: November 28, 1972
- Designated CP: May 31, 1980

The John Sullivan House is a historic house at 21 Newmarket Road in Durham, New Hampshire. A National Historic Landmark, it was the home of American Revolutionary War General John Sullivan (1740-1795), who later became President (the position now called Governor) of New Hampshire.

The house is a two-story L-shaped wood frame Georgian structure, with a central chimney and a gable roof. It was built sometime between 1729 and 1741 by Dr. Samuel Adams, and is located in the oldest portion of Durham, now a historic district. The main block is 38 feet (12 m) wide and 28 feet (8.5 m) deep, with an ell extending from its southwest rear that is 26 feet (7.9 m) by 13 feet (4.0 m). The front entry, centered on the main facade, is sheltered by a portico that is an early 20th-century addition. The interior of the main block has three rooms separated by a short central hallway. The room to the left served historically as Sullivan's library, and while on the right are the parlor with the dining room behind. There are slave quarters in the rear. The ell contains the kitchen and a service stair. There are three bedrooms on the second floor, and one in the attic. There is much original woodwork dating to the 18th century.

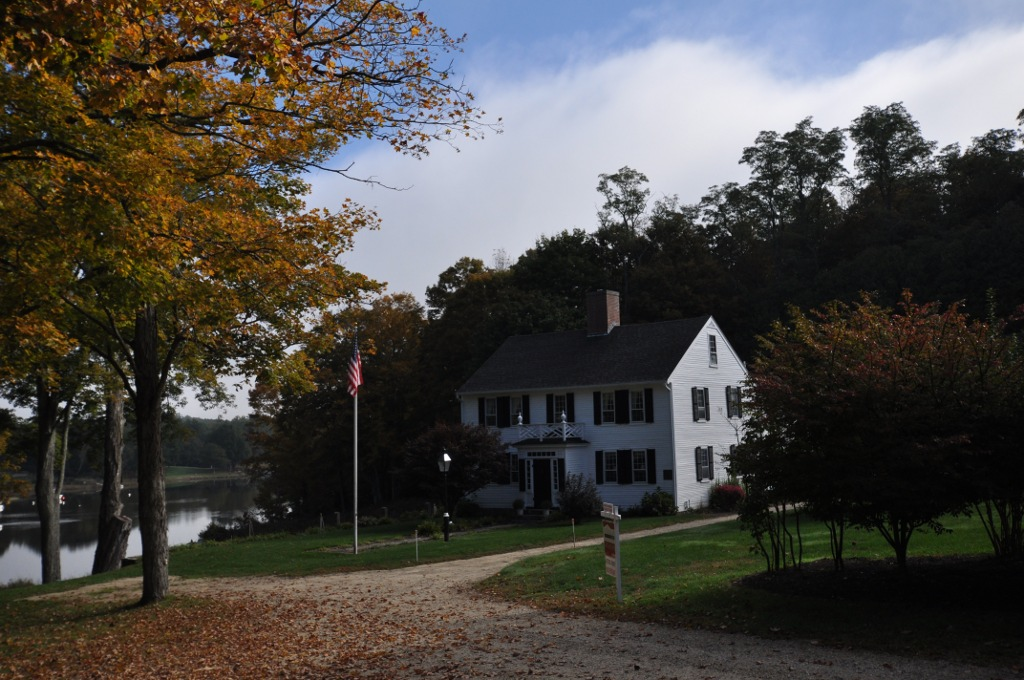
The house in 2013

John Sullivan was born in nearby Somersworth, and studied law. He settled in Durham to practice law in 1763, and purchased this house in 1763. It served as his home for the rest of his life, and he is buried in the family cemetery nearby. Sullivan was a vocal opponent of British rule in the colonies, and was elected to the First Continental Congress in 1774. In December of that year he led a raid on Fort William and Mary in which the colonial militia seized munitions stored there. He was appointed a brigadier general in the Continental Army in 1775, and served through the American Revolutionary War. He participated in the Siege of Boston, and was captured by the British in the 1776 Battle of Long Island. After being exchanged, he served in the Battle of Trenton, the Philadelphia campaign of 1777, the failed attempt to recapture Newport, Rhode Island, and the 1779 Sullivan Expedition, in which the Iroquois, who had largely sided with the British, were driven from upstate New York. Sullivan's actions and barbed personality made him enemies in Congress, and he resigned from the army late in 1779. He returned to New Hampshire, where he served as Attorney General 1782–86, and as President (the office now known as Governor) 1787–89. He chaired the state convention that ratified the United States Constitution.

The house was declared a National Historic Landmark in 1972. It is a private residence, and is not normally open to the public.

== See also ==
- List of National Historic Landmarks in New Hampshire
- National Register of Historic Places listings in Strafford County, New Hampshire
