= Abraham Jaquith House =

Historic house in Massachusetts, United States

- Formerly listed on the U.S. National Register of Historic Places
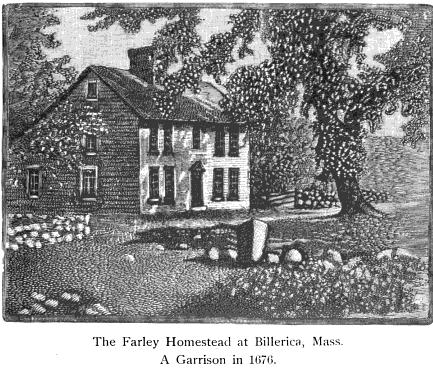

- Location within New Hampshire Location within the United States
- Location: 1246 Province Road Gilmanton, New Hampshire
- Coordinates: 43.3923784°N 71.3656757°W
- Area: 1 acre (0.40 ha)
- Built: c. 1725
- Architectural style: Colonial
- MPS: First Period Buildings of Eastern Massachusetts TR
- NRHP reference No.: 90000166

Significant dates
- Added to NRHP: March 14, 1991
- Removed from NRHP: February 8, 2024

The Abraham Jaquith House, also known as Farley Garrison house, is a house at 1246 Province Road in Gilmanton, New Hampshire. Built about 1725 in Billerica, Massachusetts, it was dismantled and moved to its present location in the early 2000s. It was listed on the National Register of Historic Places in 1991, and was delisted in 2024.

== Description and history ==
The Abraham Jaquith House was located at the northeast corner of Concord Road and Middlesex Turnpike. It was a 2 1/2-story timber-frame structure, with a gable roof, central chimney, and clapboarded exterior. Its main facade was five bays wide, with a center entrance sheltered by a 19th-century Italianate hood. The rear roof extended to the first floor in leanto fashion, giving the house a saltbox profile. Windows were rectangular sash, with a slightly smaller one above the entrance. The interior included exposed beams, a narrow staircase in the entry vestibule, and feathered woodwork around the fireplaces. The chamber in the leanto section showed evidence that it was a later construction.

Local tradition credited this house's construction to George Farley and his wife, Christian Bietres Farley, one of the area's first colonial settler families (both arrived in Massachusetts colony in 1639, founded the town of Billerica after moving there with several other families in 1653/54). However, architectural analysis of the western three bays, its oldest portion, estimated a date of 1725, around the time when the Farley's daughter married Abraham Jaquith. The lean-to and eastern two bays were added during the 18th century. Family lore says that the eastern half of the house was allowed to deteriorate in the late 19th century by one of two brothers occupying the house. That portion eventually collapsed, and was poorly reconstructed in 1922. In 2000, building owner Peter Jaquith Casey had the house disassembled and stored in New Hampshire in order to preserve it. Parts of the structure were dismantled and re-assembled on 12 acres in Gilmanton, New Hampshire by Gilmanton resident Douglas Towle in 2010, who then sold it as a private dwelling alongside reconstructed outbuildings, including a barn typical of the 1700–1800s and an old schoolhouse and corn crib. The house is reproduced as it may have looked in 1725.

== See also ==
- List of the oldest buildings in New Hampshire
- National Register of Historic Places listings in Middlesex County, Massachusetts
