= List of the oldest buildings in New Hampshire =

This article attempts to list the oldest buildings in the state of New Hampshire in the United States of America, including the oldest houses in New Hampshire and any other surviving structures from the First Period. Some dates are approximate and based on architectural studies and historical records, other dates are based on dendrochronology. All entries should include citation with reference to: architectural features; a report by an architectural historian; or dendrochronology; or else be denoted as estimates in the separate lower list.

== Verified ==
Ages of the buildings listed in this table have been verified with dendrochronology or architectural survey.

Building	Image	Location	First built	Notes	Ref.
Jackson House		Portsmouth	1664	Often credited as the oldest surviving house in New Hampshire.	
Damm-Drew Garrison House		Dover	1675	Part of Woodman Institute Museum	
Sherburn House		Portsmouth	1695	Part of Strawbery Banke museum	
Paul Wentworth House		Rollinsford	1701	Located at 47 Water St, Rollinsford; it is "educational and cultural center for Rollinsford and the lower Salmon Falls region."	
Gilman Garrison House		Exeter	1709	Construction date determined by dendrochronology	
Warner House		Portsmouth	1716	One of the finest early-Georgian brick houses in New England	
Newington Meeting House		Newington	1713	Oldest church building in New Hampshire. First used in 1713, while still under construction.	
James House		Hampton	1723	First period house, dated by dendrochronology	
Jaquith House (Farley Garrison House)		Gilmanton	c.1725	Building was moved to New Hampshire from Billerica, Massachusetts, in 2010. Once thought to date from 1665; architectural survey estimates c.1725	
Newington Old Parsonage		Newington	1765	Located at 2 New Hampshire Route 4 in Dover	
Haverhill–Bath Covered Bridge		Bath and Woodsville	1829	Oldest covered bridge in New Hampshire	

== Unverified estimates ==
Building	Image	Location	First built	Notes	Ref.
Hill-Woodman-Ffrost House		Durham	c.1649	Currently a hotel and tavern in the Durham Historic District. According to the owner, it "has an ell that is believed to date to 1649" and is possibly the original house on the site.	
The Brown House		New Ipswich	1750	Still a private residence at 209 Ashby Road, the house was built by Josiah Brown out of American chestnut, and is still surrounded by old varietals of roses and hydrangeas.	Its construction date is recorded in a book held by the New Ipswich historical society.

== See also ==
- List of the oldest buildings in the United States
- Timeline of architectural styles
