= Durham Historic District =

Historic district in New Hampshire, United States

- U.S. National Register of Historic Places
- U.S. Historic district
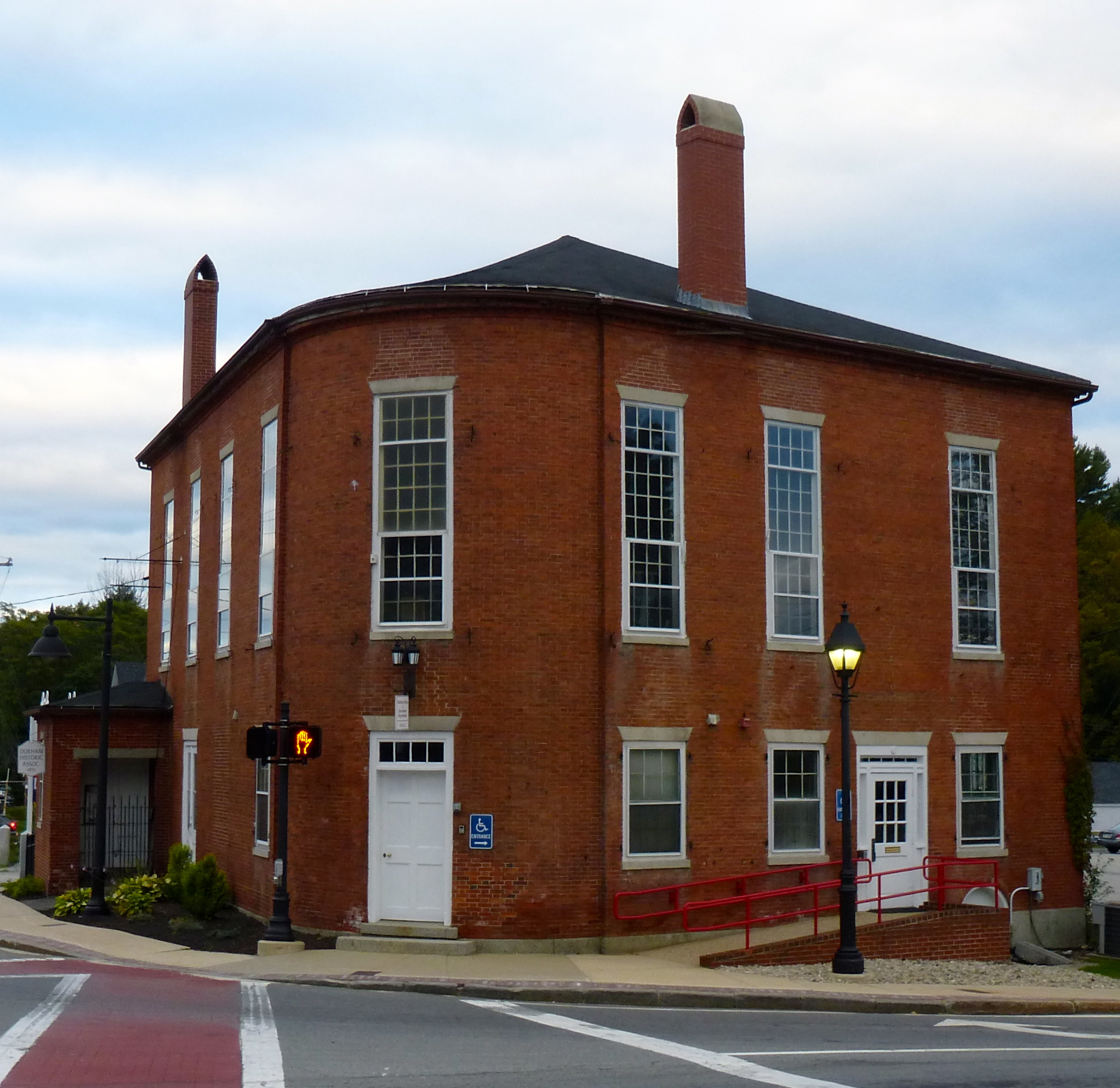

- Location within New Hampshire Location within the United States
- Location: Main St. and Newmarket Rd., Durham, New Hampshire
- Coordinates: 43°7′47″N 70°55′10″W
- Area: 66 acres (27 ha)
- Built: 1649
- Architect: Multiple
- Architectural style: Greek Revival, Federal, Georgian-Cape
- NRHP reference No.: 80000308
- Added to NRHP: May 31, 1980

The Durham Historic District encompasses a portion of the original historic settlement area of Durham, New Hampshire. It extends along Newmarket Road (New Hampshire Route 108) from its northern junction with Laurel Lane to a three-way junction with Main Street and Dover Road (the latter being the continuation of NH 108). From there it extends along Main Street to Madbury Road. This area, known in early colonial days as the Oyster River Plantation, for the Oyster River which bisects it, was first settled in 1649. It was developed in the 18th century as a significant shipbuilding center. The district was listed on the National Register of Historic Places in 1980.

== Buildings ==
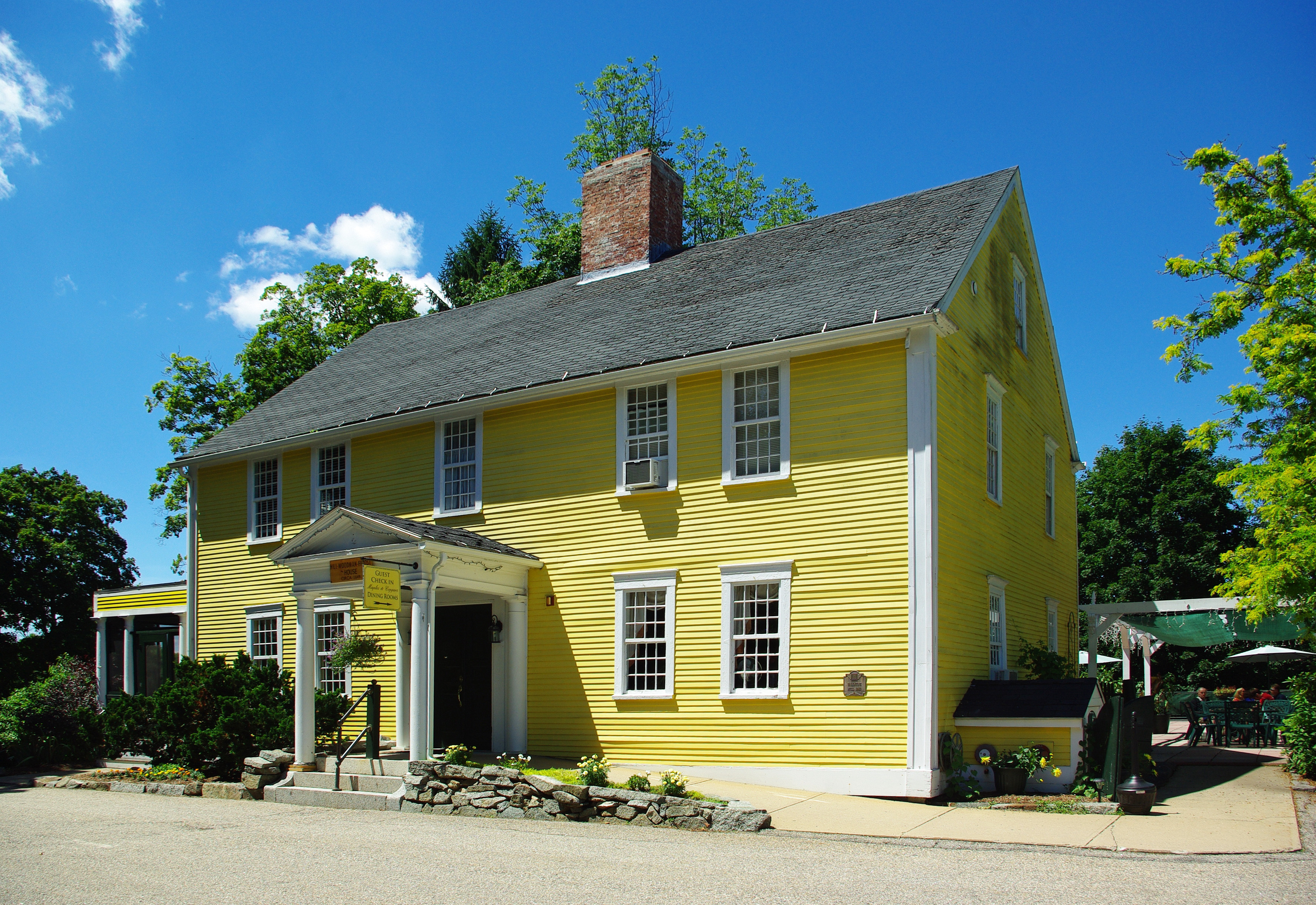
Hill-Woodman-Ffrost House (Three Chimneys Inn - ffrost Sawyer Tavern), ca. 1649, one of the oldest houses in New Hampshire

Prominent buildings in the district include Durham's town hall (a c. 1825 brick building) and town office building (a c. 1860 vernacular house), and the Durham Community Church, built in 1848–49, which is the focal point of the Main Street section of the district. Along Newmarket Street stand a row of 18th and 19th-century houses just south of the Oyster River. Notable among these are the John Sullivan House, a National Historic Landmark that was home to American Revolutionary War General and Governor of New Hampshire John Sullivan, and the Hill-Woodman-Ffrost House, which has an ell that is believed to date to 1649, and has been in the Ffrost family since the late 18th century; it may be one of the oldest buildings in New Hampshire. The Newmarket section also includes the Red School House, originally built as a school c. 1796, and a monument to John Sullivan placed by the state in 1894 at the site of the 1716 meeting house.

== See also ==
- National Register of Historic Places listings in Strafford County, New Hampshire
