= Hill-Woodman-Ffrost House =

Building in New Hampshire, U.S.

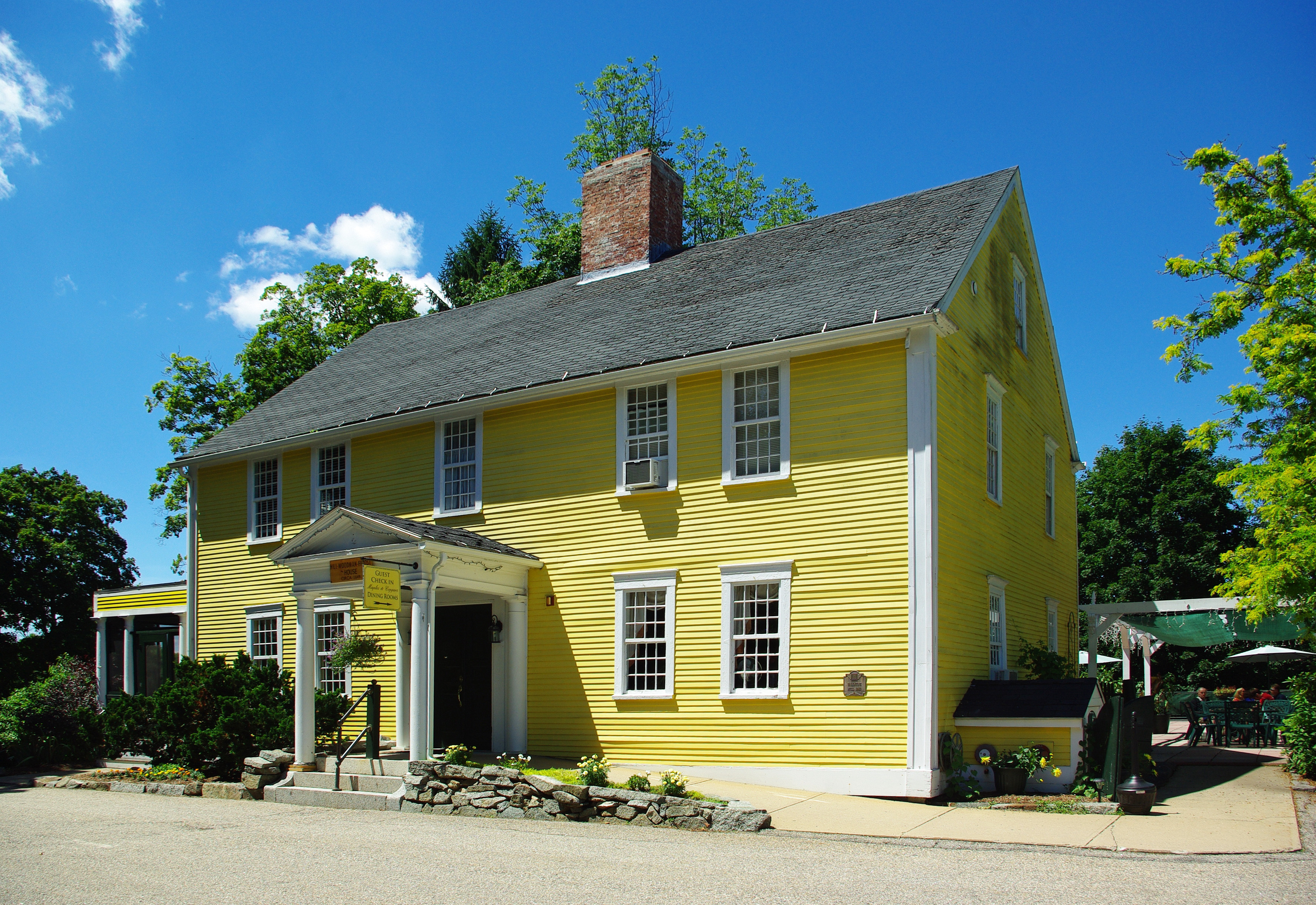
- The house in 2013
- Interactive map of the Hill-Woodman-Ffrost House area

General information
- Location: 17 Newmarket Road, Durham, New Hampshire, U.S.
- Coordinates: 43°07′56″N 70°55′08″W
- Year built: 1649; 377 years ago (claimed)

Technical details
- Floor count: 3

Other information
- Number of rooms: 23
- Number of restaurants: 3
- Number of bars: 1

Website
- www.threechimneysinn.com

The Hill-Woodman-Ffrost House in Durham, New Hampshire, is purportedly one of the oldest buildings in the U.S state of New Hampshire. Located within the Durham Historic District, the owners claim that the "original homestead" was built in 1649. The building is now part of a hotel known as the Three Chimneys Inn & ffrost Sawyer Tavern.

== History ==
In 1649, Valentine Hill built a home north of the Oyster River near his mill. The tavern's back ell is alleged by the owners to be Hill's original house, with later additions made by Nathaniel Hill around 1680. In 1694, the house survived a Native American attack, the Raid on Oyster River, which destroyed many of the buildings in the area. Jonathan Woodman eventually inherited the property from his Hill family members; he deeded it to George Frost at some point after 1796, and the Frost family owned it until the 1980s.

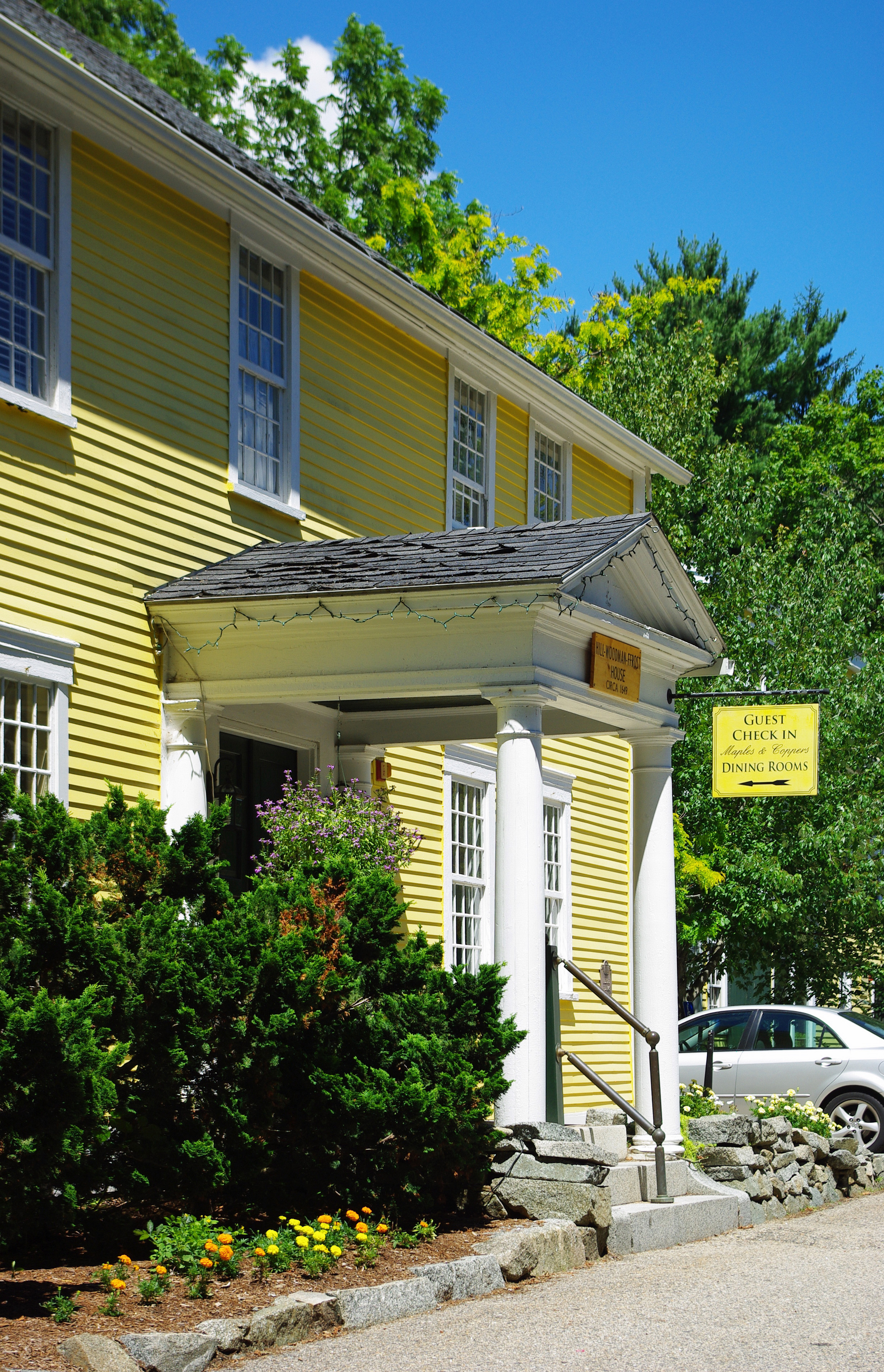
Main entrance in 2013

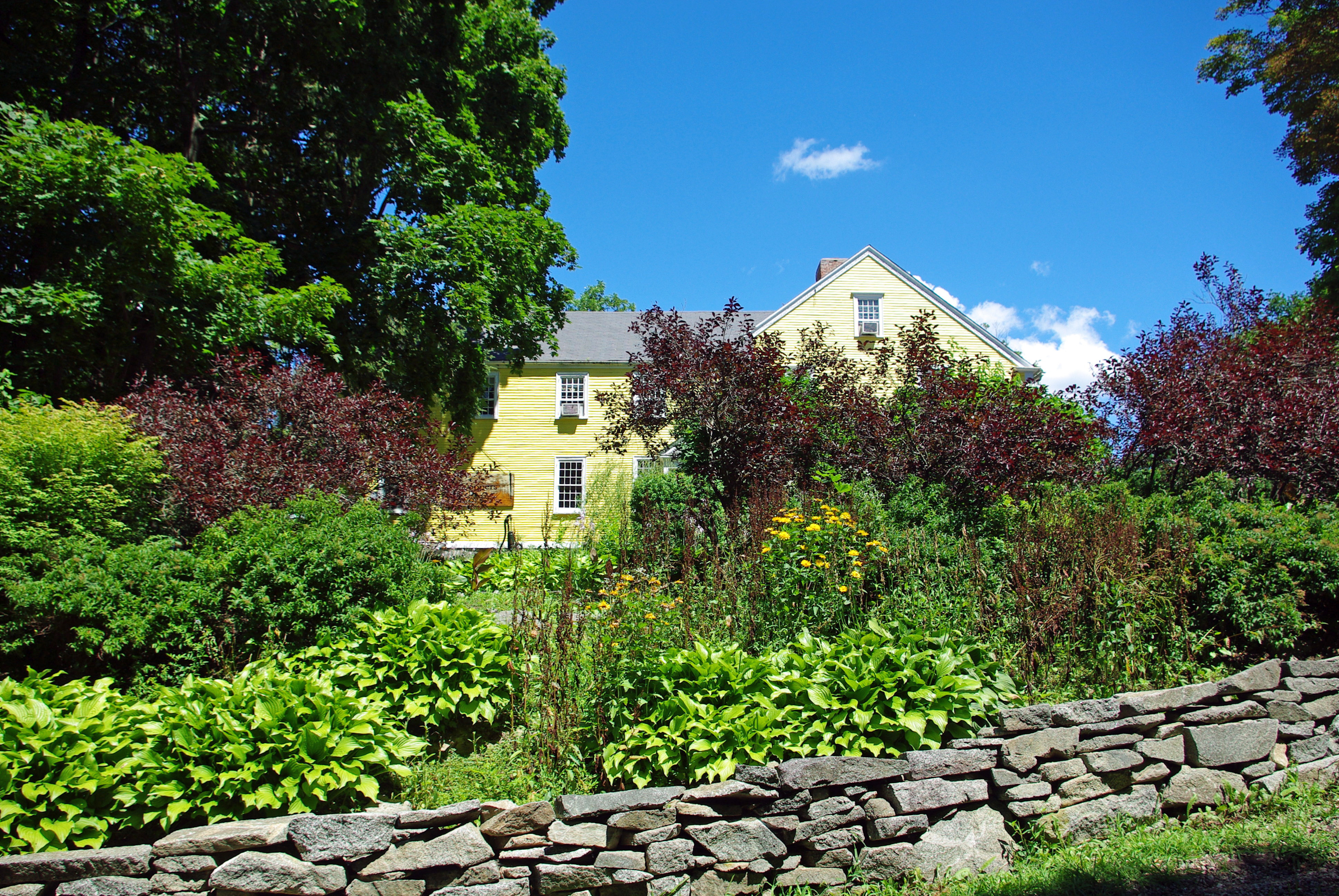
Older back ell in 2013

== See also ==
- List of the oldest buildings in New Hampshire
