= Shambles Square, Manchester =

Square in Manchester, England

Shambles Square
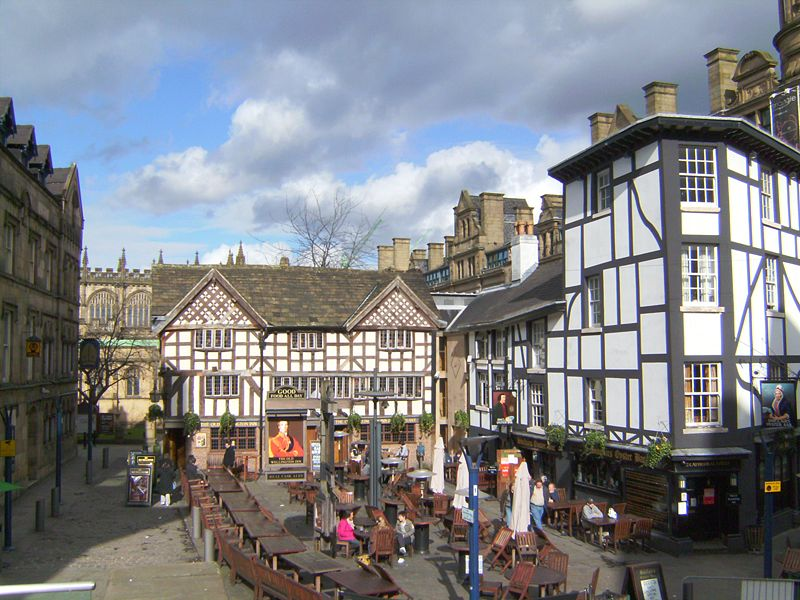
- Shambles Square in 2008
- Interactive map of Shambles Square
- Namesake: Old Shambles, Manchester
- Maintained by: City of Manchester
- Location: Manchester, England
- Quarter: Medieval Quarter (Cathedral Quarter)
- Postal code: M3
- Coordinates: 53.484552°N 2.244040°W
- North: The Old Wellington Inn
- East: Sinclair's Oyster Bar
- South: Hanging Ditch
- West: Cathedral Gates

Construction
- Completed: 1999; 27 years ago

Other
- Status: pedestrianised

Shambles Square is a square in Manchester, England. It was created in 1999, when The Old Wellington Inn and Sinclair's Oyster Bar were rebuilt there, having been moved from the Old Shambles nearby as part of major building works in the city following the 1996 Manchester bombing.

== Toponymy ==
"Shambles" is derived from the Middle English word schamel, which meant a bench for displaying meat for sale. It was a name used often in the UK for a street of butchers' shops where meat was slaughtered and sold. Streets known as the "Shambles" can also be found in York, Stroud, Worcester, Sevenoaks, Chesterfield and Armagh, as well as a public house in Lutterworth which was once a butcher's shop and abattoir. The surviving sense of the word, meaning a scene of disorder, derives in turn from the butchers' shambles, which were known for their open gutters containing offal, pieces of meat and blood.

== History ==
=== The Old Shambles and the original pub buildings ===
==== 16th and 17th centuries ====
The Old Wellington Inn building was constructed in 1552. The building was on the corner of Manchester's market square (which became known as Market Place) and the eastern end of the Old Shambles meat market, at the approximate location of today's New Cathedral Street.

In 1554, the building was purchased by the Byrom family, prominent linen merchants who used part of the premises as a draper's shop. The Byrom family originally leased the building in the "Flesh shambles" in 1657. Edward Byrom (1627–1668) purchased it in 1666, having taken over the family business upon the death of his father Edward, who had owned property at nearby Hanging Ditch. A third floor was added in the mid 17th century. His son, also Edward, expanded the business, buying more of the property extending to the west of the Shambles 1689 and renting additional stalls on the market. John Byrom was born there in 1692.

The Market Cross, a monument first recorded in 1680, stood in front of the eastern building. The Market Cross was the site of a corn market, the stocks and pillory, as well as a "rogues' post" for those sentenced to public whipping. The cross was replaced in 1725, probably with an obelisk, and was removed in 1816 along with the stocks and pillory.

==== 18th century ====
Joseph Byrom inherited the original eastern Shambles building in 1713, buying the remainder of the western section (which would later become Sinclair's Oyster Bar) in 1729. The building was extended in the 18th century to house John Shaw's Punch House, licensed for the sale of strong alcoholic punch, which became a meeting place for High Tories and possibly Jacobites. Shaw was master of the punch house for 58 years until his death in 1796, when it passed to Peter Fearnhead, and was sold again about ten years later to William Goodall, former proprietor of the Fleece Tavern at the opposite end of the Old Shambles.

==== 19th century ====
The new landlord demolished part of the building and converted the rest into The King's Head Tavern in 1807, which later became known as Sinclair's.

The butchers' stalls were moved from the Old Shambles to new premises in Brown Street, built by the Lord of the manor, Sir Oswald Mosley, in 1827.

The eastern building became licensed premises in around 1829, when it was listed in Pigot's Directory as the Vintner's Arms, and then became The Kenyon Vaults. In 1845 it was renamed The Wellington Inn. Also in 1845, oysters were introduced to the menu at Sinclair's and it was renamed Sinclair's Oyster Bar, the name it retains to this day.

=== Changes at the Old Shambles ===
During the Victorian era, many buildings in the market place, including some adjacent to The Old Shambles, were demolished for road improvements. Most other buildings in the area were destroyed in 1940 by the Manchester Blitz. However, the Old Shambles survived. This left it as one of the few pre-19th century structures in Manchester city centre, and The Wellington Inn as the only Tudor building. In response to post-war rebuilding plans which threatened the buildings, they were both designated Grade II listed in 1952.

In 1953, planners presented a revised proposal and the city began acquiring the land for the new 'old Market place', though the protected status of the buildings on the Shambles delayed the building process. In 1974, most of the old property between Shudehill and Market Street was demolished to accommodate the new Arndale Shopping Centre. A new Shambles Square was created, and developers ceded to pressure to preserve the buildings. The Old Shambles was underpinned with a concrete raft and jacked up 4 ft 9 in (1.45 m) to fit in with this development.

=== Relocation ===
In June 1996, an IRA bomb exploded in nearby Corporation Street and badly damaged many of the surrounding buildings, but the Old Shambles was protected by the concrete buildings around it and suffered only minimal damage. In 1998, £12m funding was provided by the government-sponsored redevelopment agency English Partnerships (EP), private companies, the European Economic Community (EEC) and Manchester City Council to redevelop Shambles Square. The buildings were subsequently dismantled and moved 70 metres northwards to their present location, close to Manchester Cathedral, in 1999.

The Old Wellington Inn and Sinclair's were rebuilt at 90 degrees to each other and joined together by a stone extension to form two sides of the new Shambles Square. The third side of the square is fronted by The Mitre Hotel which was built as The Old Church Tavern in 1815. Prince Charles Edward Stuart is said to have reviewed his troops by the tavern in 1745. It was renamed The Mitre Hotel around 1835.

== Gallery ==
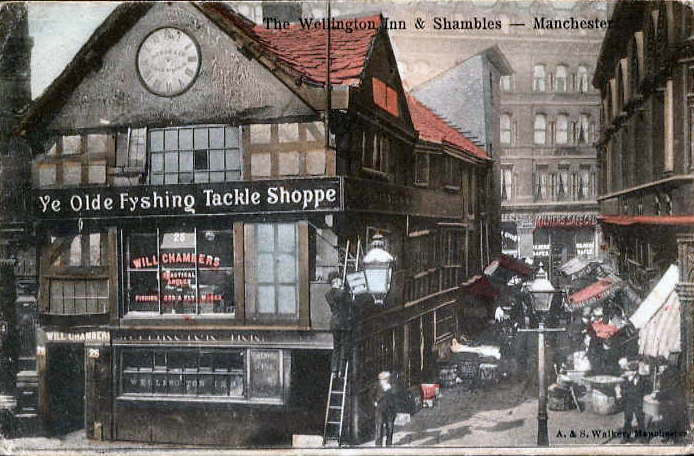
Old Shambles in its original location c. 1904

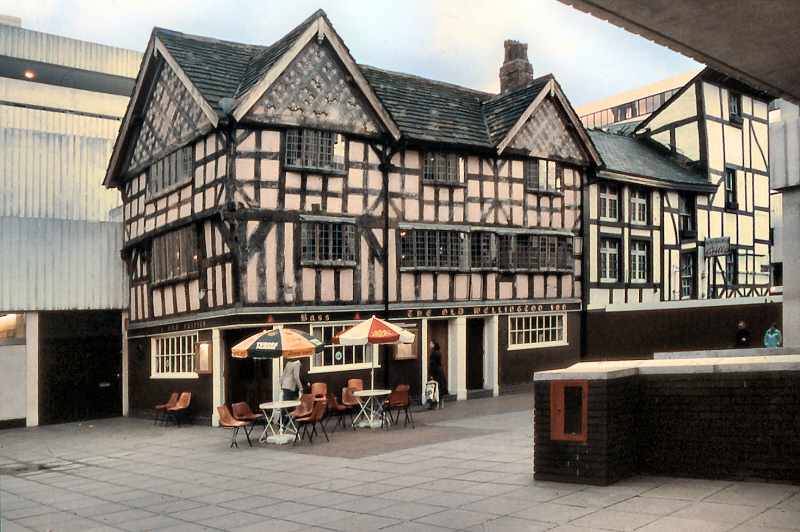
The pubs in 1977 at the former Shambles, having been jacked up to the level of the newly-rebuilt square

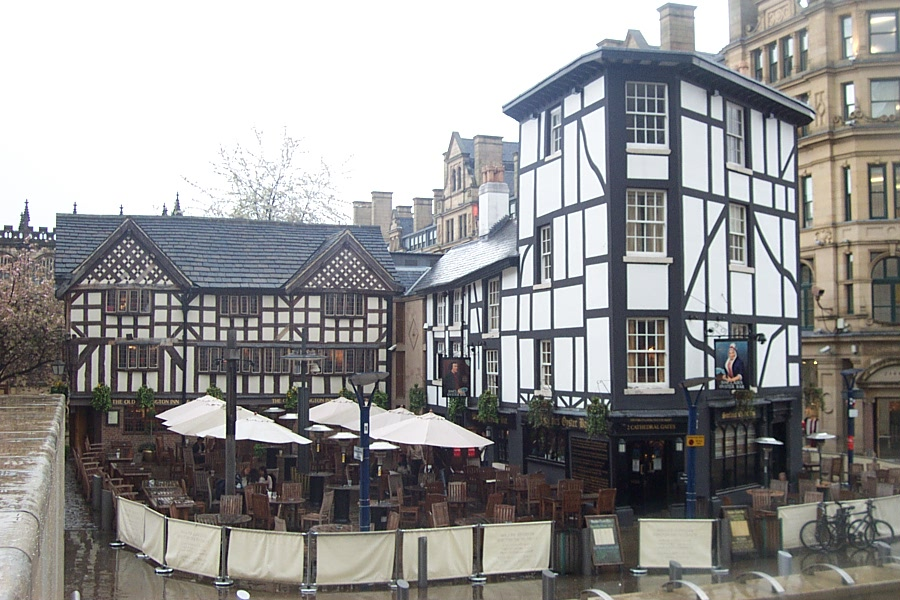
The pubs in 2006, having been moved and reassembled at the current Shambles Square

== See also ==
- History of Manchester
- Structure relocation: Reassembly moves
