= The Old Wellington Inn =

Listed pub in Manchester, England

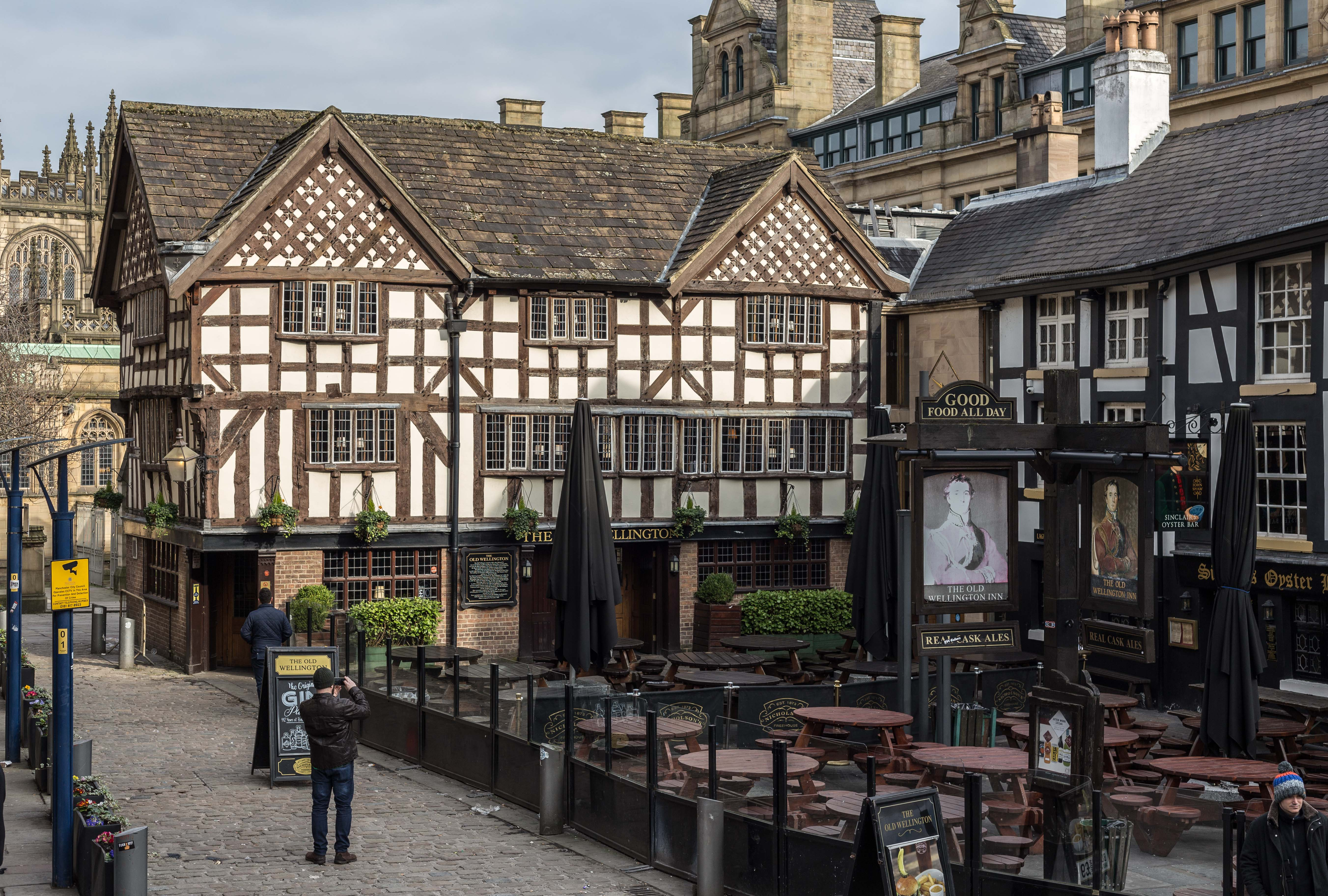
- The pub in 2016

General information
- Type: Public house
- Location: 4 Cathedral Gates, Manchester, England
- Coordinates: 53.4847°N 2.2440°W
- Year built: 1552; 474 years ago
- Renovated: 1971, late 1990s

Technical details
- Floor count: 3

Design and construction
- Designations

Listed Building – Grade II
- Official name: The Old Wellington Inn
- Designated: 25 February 1952
- Reference no.: 1270698

Other information
- Public transit: Manchester Victoria

Website
- Official website

The Old Wellington Inn is a historic public house in Manchester city centre, England. It is part of Shambles Square, which was created in 1999, and is near Manchester Cathedral. It is a Grade II listed building.

== History ==
The oldest half-timbered pub in Manchester city centre, the Old Wellington Inn was built in 1552 next to the market square which led off what is now Market Street, in what was known as the Shambles. In 1554, part of it became a draper's shop, owned by the Byrom family, and the writer John Byrom was born there in 1692. The building had a third storey added to it in the 17th century. In 1830, the building became a licensed public house, known as The Vintners Arms, and later The Kenyon Vaults. By 1865, the ground floor of the building was known as The Wellington Inn, while the upper floors were used by makers of mathematical and optical instruments. Later, in 1897, the upper floors were used as a fishing tackle shop, known as "Ye Olde Fyshing Tackle Shoppe".

The building was extended in the 18th century to house John Shaw's Punch House which, as the name suggests, was licensed for the sale of strong alcoholic punch, and became a meeting place for High Tories and possibly Jacobites. The customers usually assembled around 6 o'clock and, according to rule, called for "sixpennyworth of punch". John Shaw was a stickler for discipline, having formerly been a trooper and fought in the wars of Queen Anne's reign, and the rules of the establishment were strictly enforced. Eight o'clock was the hour fixed by law for closing and, as soon as the clock struck eight, Shaw would present himself before his guests and proclaim in a loud voice "Eight o'clock gentlemen, eight o'clock!" accompanying the announcement with the suggestive cracking of a horsewhip. This would normally soon clear the house but, if the cracking of the whip failed, his maid, Molly Owen, was ordered to use the contents of her mop bucket to "expedite the movement of the loiterer". When one Colonel Stanley was elected Member of Parliament for the county he took his friends to Shaw's, and when "Eight o'clock" was announced as usual, said that he hoped Mr Shaw would not press the matter on this special occasion. Shaw replied "Colonel Stanley, you are a lawmaker and should not be a lawbreaker, and if you and your friends do not leave the room in five minutes you will find your shoes full of water!" Within that time Molly came in with her mop bucket and the Colonel and his friends were required to beat a hasty retreat.

Shaw was master of the punch house for 58 years until he died in 1796 at the age of 83. After Shaw's death the punch house was kept by Peter Fearnhead, with the assistance of Molly under the same rules, until it was sold about ten years later to William Goodall, who had been the proprietor of the Fleece Tavern at the opposite end of the Old Shambles. The new landlord demolished part of the building and converted the rest into The King's Head Tavern in 1807. It later became known as Sinclair's, until oysters were introduced to the menu in 1845 and it became Sinclair's Oyster Bar, the name it retains to this day.

Many of the buildings in the market place were demolished in the Victorian era to make way for road improvements and the rest were destroyed in the Manchester Blitz in 1940, leaving the Old Shambles as one of the few pre-19th-century buildings, and The Wellington Inn as the only surviving Tudor building in Manchester city centre. The buildings were both designated as Grade II listed buildings in 1952.

On 22 July 1971, the process began of elevating the Old Shambles in order to fit with the development of 'The Market Place Centre'. This separate development was intended to provide a single level walk, from the Arndale Centre; to which it was connected by a glass bridge over Corporation Street, and then on to Deansgate. The Old Wellington was underpinned with a concrete raft, designed by draughtsman Fred Kennedy, then raised half inch by half inch using hydraulic jacks for three months, until 27 October 1971 when it had been sufficiently raised a total of 5 feet (1.5 m).

The Old Wellington Inn was reopened in 1981. Prior to the jacking operation, the entire internal structure of the whole block was removed and replaced by an internal, steel bracing framework. Only the curtain walling remained of the original Tudor building. Moreover, when rebuilt, it was necessary to do so to all the latest building regulations. Originally, due to centuries of settlement, there was not a straight line in the building. The floors, ceilings and windows were all awry, and there were several low beams in the bar area which had to be ducked under by all but the shortest clientele. The main one bore the legend 'Duck or Grouse'.

It was damaged in the 1996 Manchester bombing, and was reopened in February 1997, with costs of £500,000 paid to repair the damage. However, in preparation for the city's development in the bomb's aftermath, it was decided that the building, alongside its neighbour Sinclair's Oyster Bar, should be dismantled and rebuilt 300 m (980 ft) towards the cathedral to form Shambles Square. The move was completed by November 1999, when the pub reopened.

== See also ==
- Listed buildings in Manchester-M3
- Listed pubs in Greater Manchester
