= Woodman Institute Museum =

Historic house in New Hampshire, United States

- Woodman Institute
- U.S. National Register of Historic Places
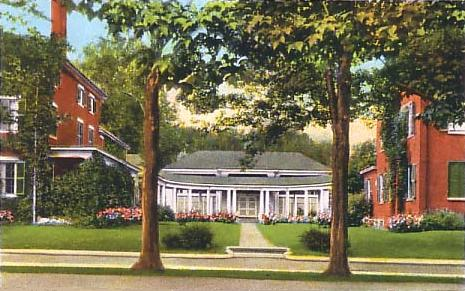
- Woodman Institute Museum

- Location within New Hampshire Location within the United States
- Location: 182 Central Ave., Dover, New Hampshire
- Coordinates: 43°11′23″N 70°52′27″W
- Built: 1675 Damm Garrison; 1813 Hale House; 1818 Woodman House; 1827 Keefe House
- Architect: Captain William Palmer
- Architectural style: Federal, Garrison House
- NRHP reference No.: 80000317
- Added to NRHP: July 24, 1980

The Woodman Institute Museum is located at 182 Central Avenue in Dover, New Hampshire, United States. It is a museum dedicated to “To advance and develop passion for history, science, and the arts. To educate, excite, and inspire current and future generations about . . . a changing nation by preserving and exhibiting objects of historic significance, decorative and fine art, and natural science that connect Dover and its citizens to . . . the world.” It was created in 1915 with a bequest of $100,000 from philanthropist Annie Woodman to encourage her city's education in those three fields. The institute opened on July 26, 1916. Under the name of "Woodman Institute", the museum was listed on the National Register of Historic Places in 1980.

== Collection ==
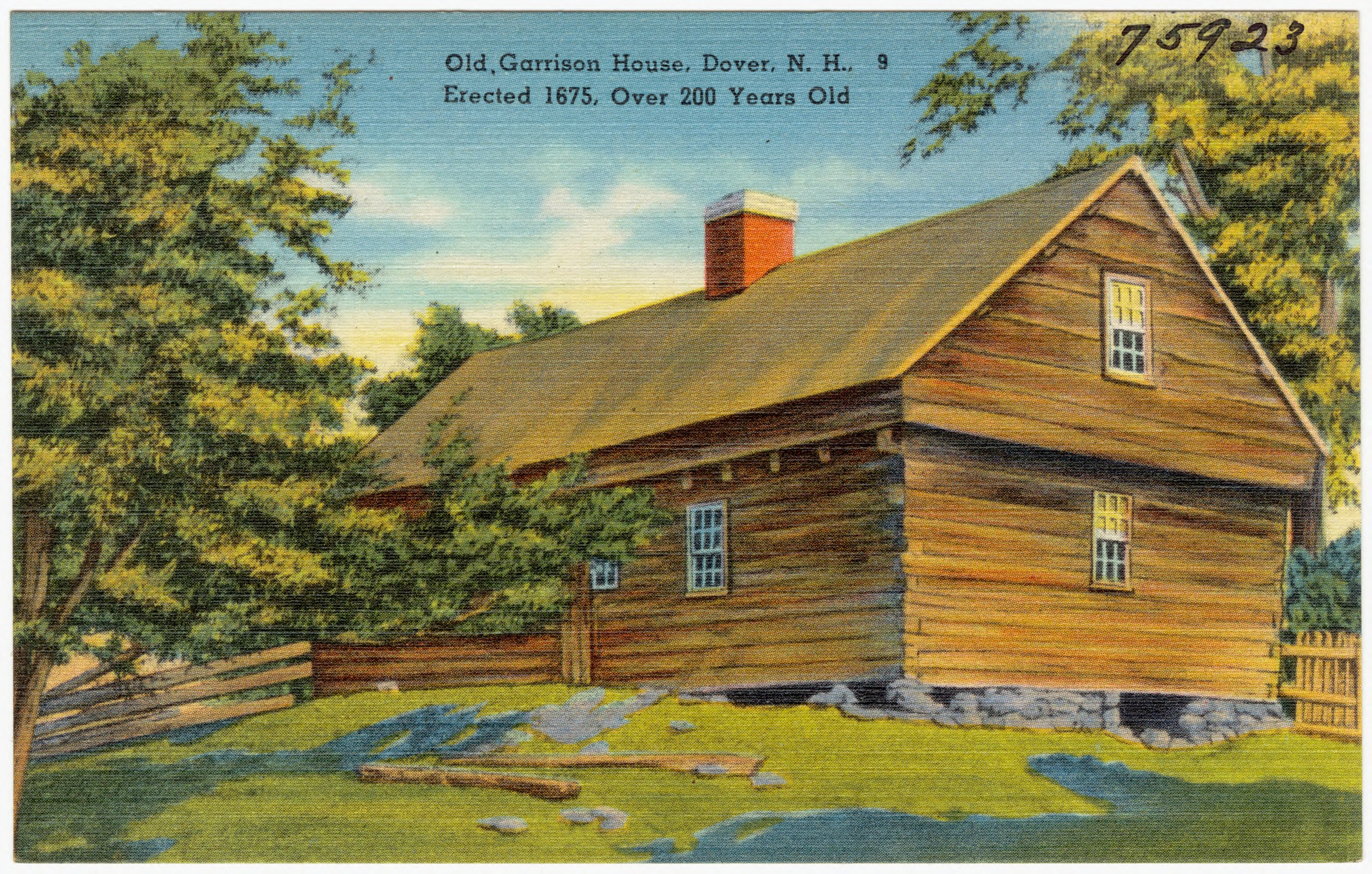
1675 William Damm Garrison, one of the oldest intact garrison houses in the state, as well as the oldest house in Dover and one of the oldest houses in New Hampshire

The museum's campus now includes three brick houses of Federal style architecture, one of which is the former home of noted abolitionist Senator John P. Hale. Inside are exhibits of local history and natural history, in addition to art and antiques. One famous item is the saddle in which President Abraham Lincoln rode to review troops shortly before his assassination. A collection of artifacts showcases the nation's past, with a special emphasis on Dover's history.

Visitors can see a sword given by a Japanese delegate to a waiter at the Hotel Wentworth during the 1905 Portsmouth Peace Conference (Treaty of Portsmouth), examples of Dover's textile output, relics from every war in which the United States has fought, a 13-star American flag, a 10-foot-tall (3.0 m) stuffed polar bear from the Arctic, a piano with ivory keys, and a collection of taxidermized birds, bugs, fish, mammals, reptiles, and amphibians.

On the museum's grounds is the 1675 William Damm Garrison, one of the oldest intact garrison houses in the state, as well as the oldest house in Dover and one of the oldest houses in New Hampshire. It survived the Cochecho Massacre, and was later moved to this location for preservation under a permanent shelter. On the grounds, in the 1st NH Light Artillery Shed, visitors may see an 1863 12-lbs bronze Napoleon cannon used in the American Civil War one of only ten left in existence. In the Tasker’s Funeral Home Shed, guests can view a Victorian funeral exhibit complete with an 1890s horse-drawn hearse. Finally, the Woodman grounds also boast a medicinal garden, rain garden, and the oldest American Sycamore tree in Strafford County.

In August 2024 and in partnership with Kevin Eastman and Kevin Eastman Studios, the museum added content related to the Teenage Mutant Ninja Turtles media franchise, which originated in Dover, to its permanent collection.

== See also ==
- List of the oldest buildings in New Hampshire
- National Register of Historic Places listings in Strafford County, New Hampshire
