= List of United States post offices in New Hampshire =

United States post offices operate under the authority of the United States Post Office Department (1792–1971) or the United States Postal Service (since 1971). Historically, post offices were usually placed in a prominent location. Many were architecturally distinctive, including notable buildings featuring Beaux-Arts, Art Deco, and Vernacular architecture. However, modern U.S. post offices were generally designed for functionality rather than architectural style.

Following is a list of United States post offices in New Hampshire. Notable post offices include individual buildings, whether still in service or not, which have architectural, historical, or community-related significance. Many of these are listed on the National Register of Historic Places (NRHP) or state and local historic registers.

Post office	City	Date built	Image	Architect	Notes	Ref.
Old Post Office (Concord, New Hampshire), now New Hampshire Legislative Office Building	Concord	1884–1889		James Riggs Hill	(Note: No longer used as a post office.) (Note: Listed on the National Register of Historic Places.)	
United States Post Office (Dover, New Hampshire)	Dover	1911		James Knox Taylor		
Hinsdale Post Office	Hinsdale	1816		Nathan Babbitt	(Note: Oldest continuously operating U.S. Post Office building.)	
U.S. Post Office-Laconia Main	Laconia	1917		James A. Wetmore		
United States Post Office–Lancaster Main	Lancaster	1935		Louis A. Simon, Neal A. Melick		
United States Post Office (Lebanon, New Hampshire)	Lebanon	1937			(Note: Houses a New Deal artwork,)	
United States Post Office and Courthouse–Littleton Main	Littleton	1933		James A. Wetmore		
Old Post Office Block	Manchester	1876		unknown		
United States Post Office (Milford, New Hampshire)	Milford	1939				
United States Post Office (Meredith, New Hampshire)	Meredith	1935–1936		Louis A. Simon, Neal A. Melick		
United States Post Office (Newport, New Hampshire)	Newport	1934–1935				
U.S. Post Office-Peterborough Main	Peterborough	1936		Louis A. Simon, Loucke & Clark		
United States Post Office (Plymouth, New Hampshire)	Plymouth	1936–1937		Louis A. Simon, Neal A. Melick		
United States Post Office (Somersworth, New Hampshire)	Somersworth	1931		James A. Wetmore, N. H. Turnbull		
United States Post Office (Wolfeboro, New Hampshire)	Wolfeboro	1937			(Note: Houses the New Deal mural, New Hampshire Sugar Camp, by Andrew Winter.)	
United States Post Office (Woodsville, New Hampshire)	Woodsville	1942				
