= Jenness =

Jenness is a surname. Notable people with the surname include:

- Benning W. Jenness (1806–1879), United States senator from New Hampshire
- Diamond Jenness (1886–1969), New Zealand-born Canadian anthropologist and explorer
- James M. Jenness (born 1946), American businessman
- John H. Jenness (1862–1915), American politician and physician
- Linda Jenness (born 1941), American politician
- Mia Sinclair Jenness (born 2005), American theater actress
- Morgan Jenness, American freelance dramaturg
- Stephen Jenness (born 1990), American field hockey player
- Theodora R. Jenness (1847–1935), American author, editor, missionary
- Valerie Jenness (born 1963), American academic

== See also ==
- Jenness Farm, historic farm property in Rochester, New Hampshire
- Jenness Pond, water body in New Hampshire
- Jenness State Beach, state park in Rye, New Hampshire
