= Michael Reade House =

Historic house in New Hampshire, United States

- U.S. National Register of Historic Places
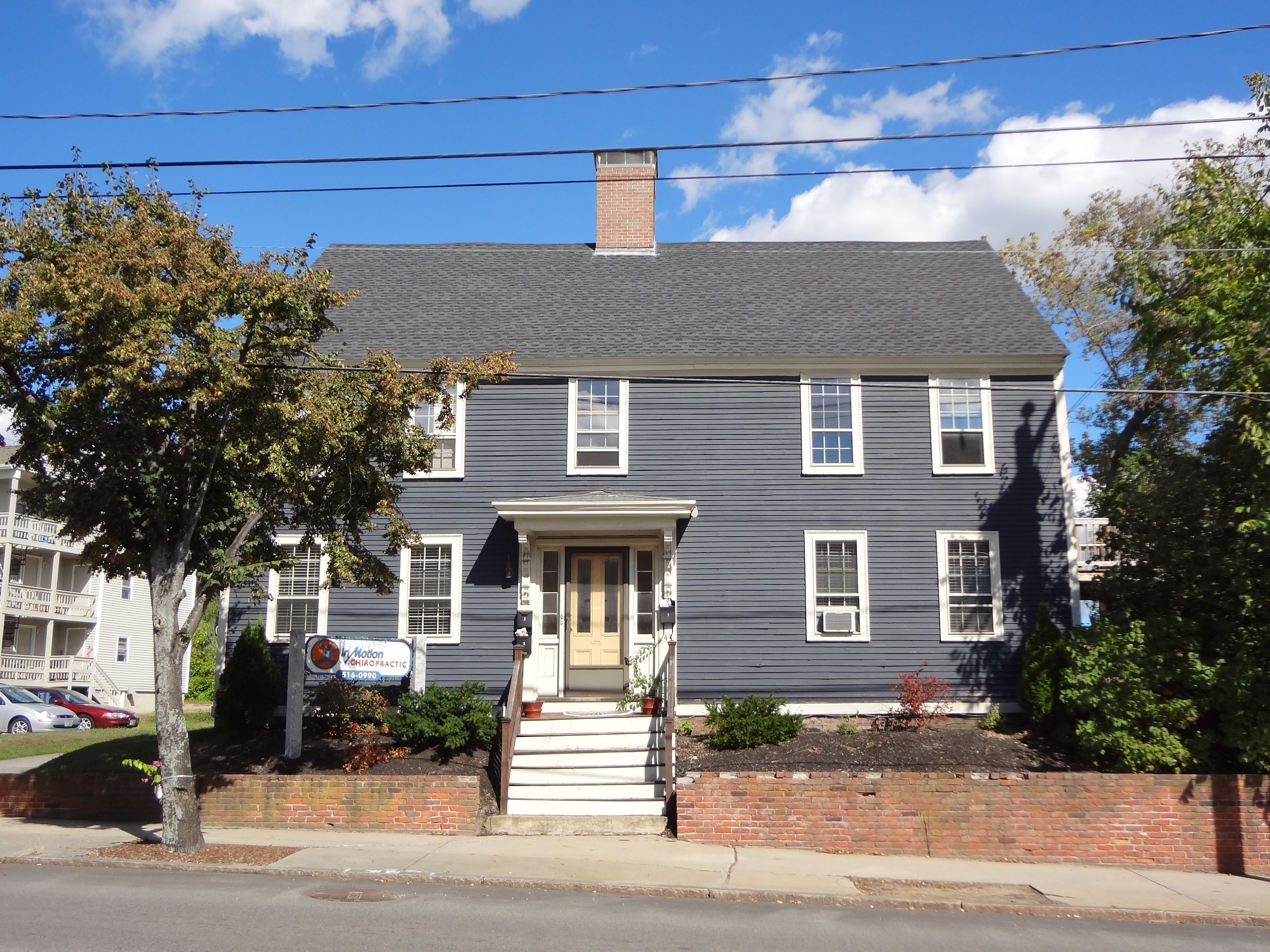

- Location within New Hampshire Location within the United States
- Location: 43 Main St., Dover, New Hampshire
- Coordinates: 43°11′50″N 70°52′21″W
- Area: 0.1 acres (0.040 ha)
- Built: 1780
- NRHP reference No.: 80000314
- Added to NRHP: February 12, 1980

The Michael Reade House is a historic house at 43 Main Street in Dover, New Hampshire. Built around 1780 for a prominent local merchant, it is one of the city's few surviving 18th-century buildings. It was listed on the National Register of Historic Places in 1980. It now houses professional offices.

== Description and history ==
The Michael Reade House stands on the southern fringe of Dover's central business district, on the east side of Main Street opposite the Cocheco Mills complex. It is a 2 1/2-story wood-frame structure, with a side-gable roof, central chimney, and clapboarded exterior. Its main façade is five bays wide, with the outer bays symmetrically placed and the center bay, where the entrance is located, skewed slightly to the left. The entry is flanked by sidelight windows and is sheltered by a mid-to-late 19th century Victorian bracketed hood. The interior follows a central chimney plan, but has an unusually wide chimney bay, suggestive of the idea that the chimney may have been built after the frame instead of before. There is fine Georgian-style wood panelling in the kitchen and southwest parlor, and transitional Federal woodwork in other rooms.

The house was built around 1780 for Michael Reade, an Irish immigrant who came to North America in 1741, and was one of Dover's leading merchants. The house is located near the historic Dover Landing area, where his ships would have docked. This area had a larger number of fine Georgian and Federal houses, most of which were demolished to make way for the mills and worker housing.

== See also ==
- National Register of Historic Places listings in Strafford County, New Hampshire
