= Samuel Wyatt House =

Historic house in New Hampshire, United States

- U.S. National Register of Historic Places
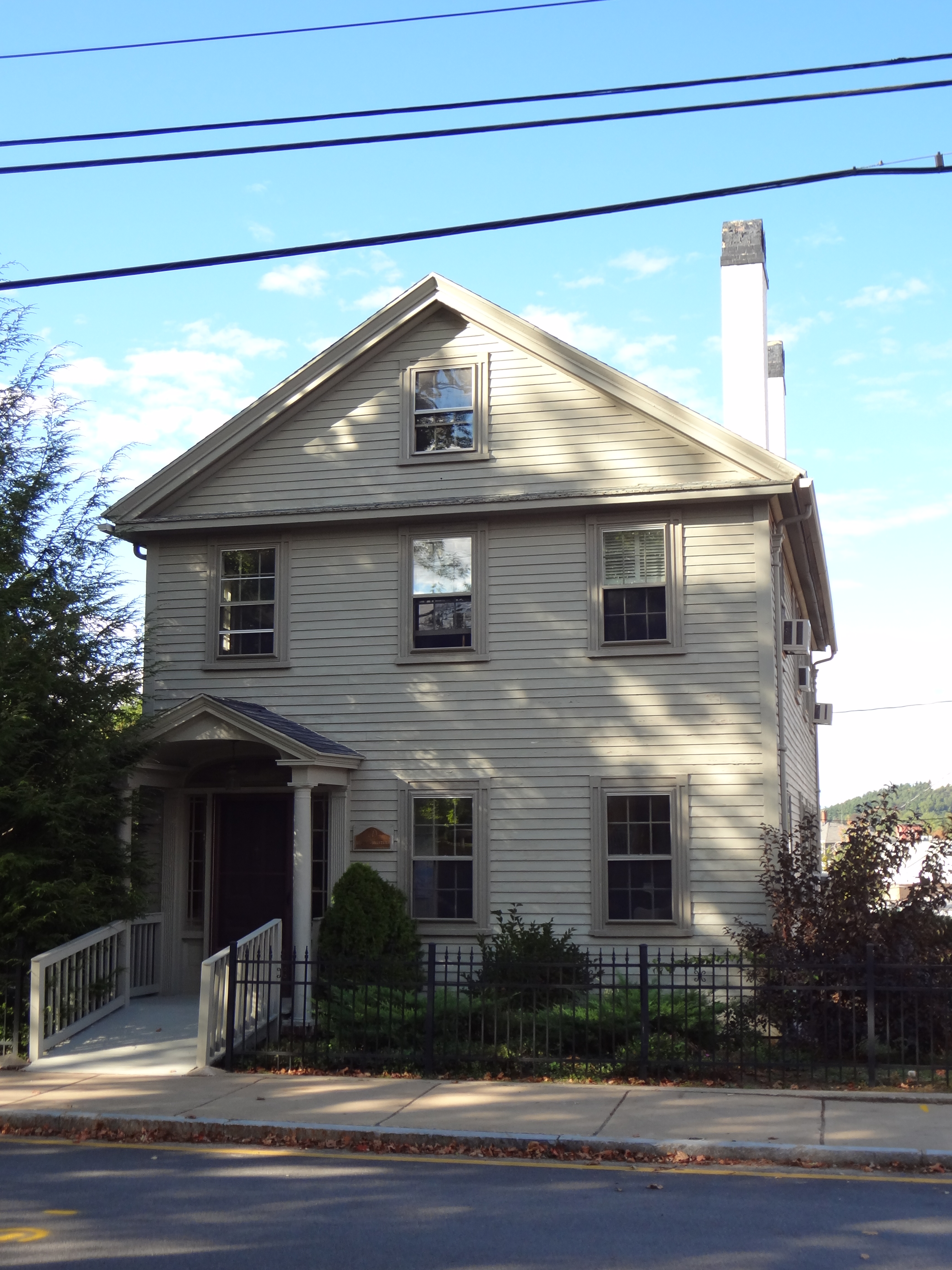

- Location within New Hampshire Location within the United States
- Location: 7 Church St., Dover, New Hampshire
- Coordinates: 43°11′30″N 70°52′31″W
- Area: 0.2 acres (0.081 ha)
- Built: 1835
- Architect: attributed to George Pendexter
- Architectural style: Greek Revival
- NRHP reference No.: 82000626
- Added to NRHP: December 2, 1982

The Samuel Wyatt House is a historic house at 7 Church Street in Dover, New Hampshire. Built in 1835, it is one of the city's best-preserved examples of Greek Revival architecture, and was home to a prominent businessman and educator. The house was listed on the National Register of Historic Places in 1982.

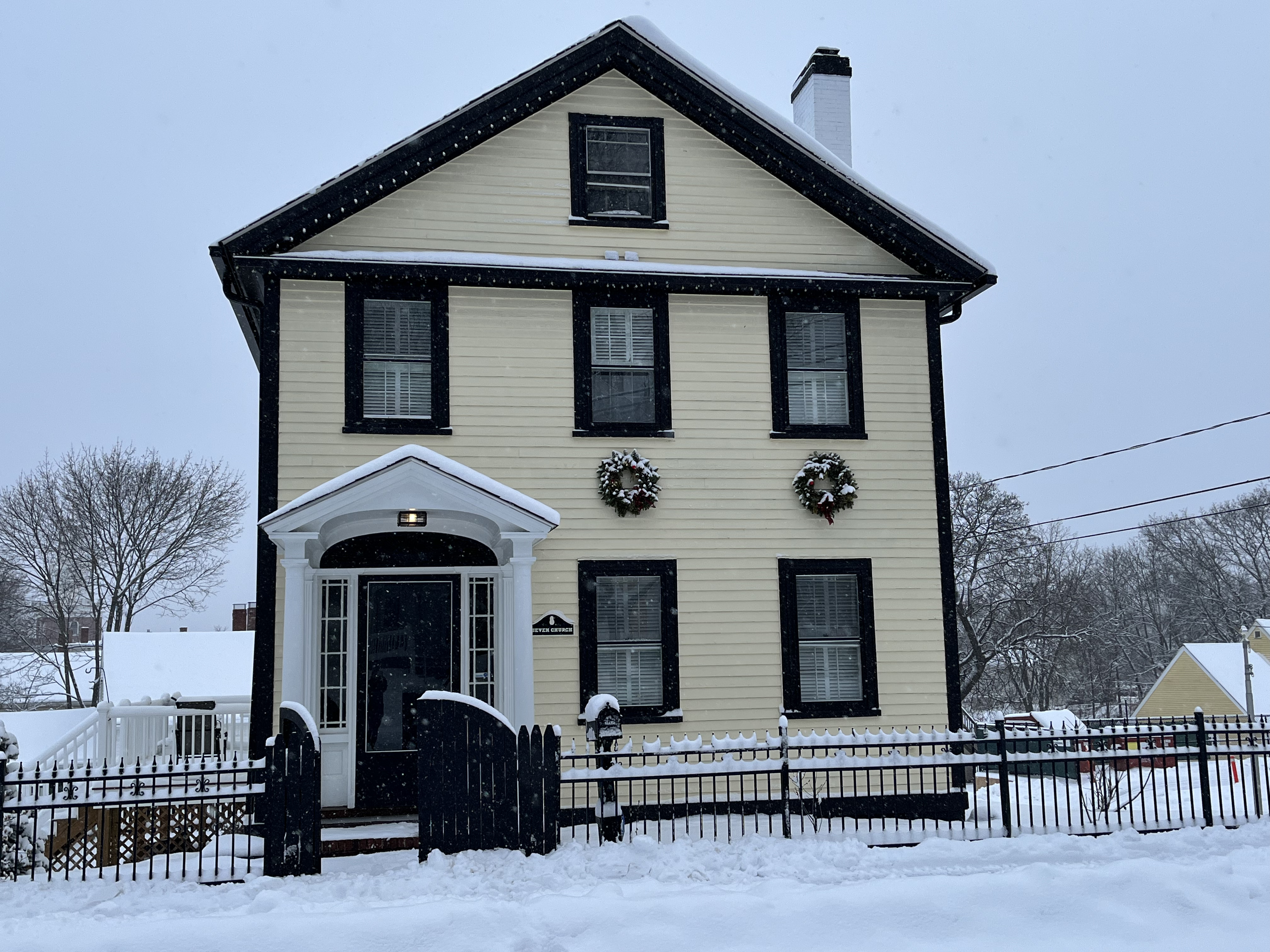

== Description and history ==
The Samuel Wyatt House is located in an area just south of Dover's downtown area, known historically as Tuttle Square, the city's commercial center during the first half of the 19th century. It is located on the north side of Church Street at its junction with Academy Street. The house is 2 1/2 stories in height, with a front-gable roof and clapboarded exterior. It is three bays wide, with a side hall entry flanked by sidelight windows and topped by a fanlight. A portico supported by Doric columns shelters the entrance. A two-story ell was added onto the north (rear) end of the house, and modified in 1938 to accommodate a garage in its basement area. The interior retains original features, including wide flooring, Greek Revival fireplace surrounds, and door and window hardware.

The house was built in 1835 for Samuel and Sophia Cushing (Hayes) Wyatt. Samuel Wyatt was owner of several hotels, including one nearby in Dover, and Sophia was a prominent local teacher and author. The Wyatts were both active social reformers, active in efforts to promote temperance in the region. Sophia Wyatt was also active in early efforts to provide increased educational opportunities for girls and women.

The building was converted to office space in the late 1990s and then converted back to a residence in 2018 at which time a deck was added to the Western side of the building.

== See also ==
- National Register of Historic Places listings in Strafford County, New Hampshire
