= National Register of Historic Places listings in Strafford County, New Hampshire =

Location of Strafford County in New Hampshire

This is a list of the National Register of Historic Places listings in Strafford County, New Hampshire.

This is intended to be a complete list of the properties and districts on the National Register of Historic Places in Strafford County, New Hampshire, United States. Latitude and longitude coordinates are provided for many National Register properties and districts; these locations may be seen together in a map.

There are 45 properties and districts listed on the National Register in the county, including one National Historic Landmark.

Contents: Counties in New Hampshire
Belknap - Carroll - Cheshire - Coös - Grafton - Hillsborough - Merrimack - Rockingham - Strafford - Sullivan

This National Park Service list is complete through NPS recent listings posted April 24, 2026.

== Current listings ==
	Name on the Register	Image	Date listed	Location	City or town	Description
1	Back River Farm	Back River Farm	June 22, 1984 (#84003236)	Bay View Rd. 43°08′21″N 70°51′16″W	Dover	
2	Canaan Chapel	Canaan Chapel	March 11, 1982 (#82001877)	Canaan Rd. 43°12′16″N 71°06′07″W	Barrington	
3	Cocheco Mills	Cocheco Mills	March 26, 2014 (#14000081)	Main & Washington Sts. 43°11′44″N 70°52′23″W	Dover	
4	County Farm Bridge	County Farm Bridge	May 21, 1975 (#75000237)	Northwest of Dover on County Farm Rd. 43°13′14″N 70°56′38″W	Dover	Over the Cocheco River - the bridge burned in 1981 and has since been replaced by a multi-use pedestrian structure
5	Durham Historic District	Durham Historic District	May 31, 1980 (#80000308)	Main St. and Newmarket Rd. 43°07′47″N 70°55′10″W	Durham	
6	Farmington Town Pound	Farmington Town Pound	September 2, 1993 (#93000884)	Northwestern side of Pound Rd. 300 ft (91 m) north of the junction of Ten Rod Rd. 43°21′33″N 71°04′49″W	Farmington	The pound was built in 1823 by the town, replacing an earlier wooden structure built in 1802, and is one of a few well-preserved pounds in southeastern New Hampshire. It remained in use until late in the 19th century, and was sold into private hands in 1918. It was given back to the town, and is now maintained by the Farmington Historical Society.
7	First Congregational Church	First Congregational Church	January 12, 2018 (#100001963)	400 Main St. 43°23′20″N 71°03′53″W	Farmington	
8	First Parish Church	First Parish Church	March 11, 1982 (#82001696)	218 Central Ave. 43°11′28″N 70°52′26″W	Dover	
9	First Parish Church Site-Dover Point	First Parish Church Site-Dover Point	May 27, 1983 (#83001153)	Dover Point Rd. 43°08′26″N 70°50′21″W	Dover	
10	Forest Glade Cemetery	Forest Glade Cemetery	January 17, 2017 (#100000476)	163 Maple St. 43°15′06″N 70°52′54″W	Somersworth	
11	Free Will Baptist Church	Free Will Baptist Church	November 13, 1980 (#80000310)	Ridge Top Road; 43°23′59″N 71°09′33″W	New Durham	
12	Garrison Hill Park and Tower	Garrison Hill Park and Tower	September 11, 1987 (#87001413)	Abbie Sawyer Memorial Dr. 43°12′34″N 70°52′13″W	Dover	
13	Green Street School	Green Street School	March 7, 1985 (#85000481)	104 Green St. 43°15′21″N 70°51′46″W	Somersworth	
14	William Hale House	William Hale House	November 18, 1980 (#80000309)	5 Hale St. 43°11′36″N 70°52′29″W	Dover	
15	Richard Hayes House	Richard Hayes House	February 27, 1986 (#86000283)	184 Gonic Rd. 43°15′38″N 70°58′44″W	Rochester	
16	Jenness Farm	Jenness Farm	March 2, 2001 (#01000206)	626 Pickering Rd. 43°14′36″N 70°56′12″W	Rochester and Dover	
17	Lehoullier Building	Lehoullier Building	December 26, 1979 (#79000211)	161-169 Main St. 43°15′31″N 70°51′46″W	Somersworth	
18	Milton Town House	Milton Town House	November 26, 1980 (#80000311)	NH 125 and Town House Rd. 43°26′25″N 70°59′06″W	Milton	
19	New Durham Meetinghouse and Pound	New Durham Meetinghouse and Pound	December 8, 1980 (#80000312)	Old Bay Rd. 43°25′25″N 71°07′42″W	New Durham	
20	New Durham Town Hall	New Durham Town Hall	November 13, 1980 (#80000313)	Main St. and Ridge Rd. 43°26′02″N 71°09′55″W	New Durham	
21	Plumer-Jones Farm	Plumer-Jones Farm	March 23, 1979 (#79000212)	1305 White Mountain Highway (NH 125); 43°27′44″N 70°59′37″W	Milton	Now the New Hampshire Farm Museum
22	Plummer Homestead	Plummer Homestead	June 14, 2002 (#02000638)	1273 White Mountain Highway (NH 125); 43°27′35″N 70°59′33″W	Milton	
23	Public Market	Public Market	March 7, 1985 (#85000541)	93 Washington St. 43°11′43″N 70°52′31″W	Dover	
24	Queensbury Mill	Queensbury Mill	April 10, 1987 (#86003362)	1 Market St. 43°15′54″N 70°51′58″W	Somersworth	
25	Michael Reade House	Michael Reade House	February 12, 1980 (#80000314)	43 Main St. 43°11′50″N 70°52′21″W	Dover	
26	Religious Society of Friends Meetinghouse	Religious Society of Friends Meetinghouse	February 29, 1980 (#80000421)	141 Central Ave. 43°11′12″N 70°52′25″W	Dover	
27	Rochester Commercial and Industrial District	Rochester Commercial and Industrial District	April 8, 1983 (#83001154)	N. Main, Wakefield, Hanson, and S. Main Sts. and Central Square; 43°18′11″N 70°58′34″W	Rochester	
28	Rollinsford Grade School	Rollinsford Grade School	September 29, 2015 (#15000670)	487 Locust St. 43°13′55″N 70°49′24″W	Rollinsford	
29	Rollinsford Town Hall	Rollinsford Town Hall	March 5, 1999 (#99000268)	667 Main St. 43°14′08″N 70°49′17″W	Rollinsford	
30	St. Thomas Episcopal Church	St. Thomas Episcopal Church	June 7, 1984 (#84003241)	5 Hale St. 43°11′36″N 70°52′30″W	Dover	
31	Salmon Falls Mill Historic District	Salmon Falls Mill Historic District	February 29, 1980 (#80000315)	Front St. 43°14′10″N 70°49′05″W	Rollinsford	
32	Sawyer Building	Sawyer Building	May 23, 1980 (#80000316)	4-6 Portland St. 43°11′47″N 70°52′19″W	Dover	
33	Sawyer Woolen Mills	Sawyer Woolen Mills	September 13, 1989 (#89001208)	1 Mill St. 43°10′44″N 70°52′35″W	Dover	
34	Smith Chapel	Smith Chapel	February 13, 2013 (#13000009)	45 Mill Pond Rd. 43°07′42″N 70°55′27″W	Durham	
35	Somersworth High School	Somersworth High School	September 29, 2015 (#15000671)	17 Grand St. 43°15′44″N 70°52′05″W	Somersworth	Most recently was Hilltop Elementary School, which closed in 2012; misspelled "Somoresworth" on the National Register.
36	Strafford County Farm	Strafford County Farm	February 25, 1981 (#81000100)	County Farm Rd. 43°13′03″N 70°56′31″W	Dover	
37	Strafford Union Academy	Strafford Union Academy	September 22, 1983 (#83001155)	NH 126 and NH 202A; 43°16′07″N 71°07′23″W	Strafford	
38	Gen. John Sullivan House	Gen. John Sullivan House	November 28, 1972 (#72000089)	23 Newmarket Rd. 43°07′48″N 70°55′05″W	Durham	Home of American Revolutionary War General John Sullivan, elected President of New Hampshire
39	Thompson Hall	Thompson Hall	December 6, 1996 (#96001468)	Off Main St., University of New Hampshire campus 43°08′09″N 70°55′59″W	Durham	
40	US Post Office-Dover Main	US Post Office-Dover Main	July 17, 1986 (#86002273)	133-137 Washington St. 43°11′42″N 70°52′39″W	Dover	
41	US Post Office-Somersworth Main	US Post Office-Somersworth Main	July 17, 1986 (#86002246)	2 Government Way; 43°15′33″N 70°52′18″W	Somersworth	
42	Wiswall Falls Mills Site	Wiswall Falls Mills Site	March 18, 1988 (#88000184)	John Hatch Park; South of Wiswall Road just east of the Lamprey River; 43°06′15″N 70°57′44″W	Durham	
43	Woodbury Mill	Woodbury Mill	March 25, 2013 (#13000156)	1 Dover St. 43°12′07″N 70°52′29″W	Dover	
44	Woodman Institute	Woodman Institute	July 24, 1980 (#80000317)	182 Central Ave. 43°11′20″N 70°52′28″W	Dover	
45	Samuel Wyatt House	Samuel Wyatt House	December 2, 1982 (#82000626)	7 Church St. 43°11′30″N 70°52′31″W	Dover	

== See also ==
- List of National Historic Landmarks in New Hampshire
- National Register of Historic Places listings in New Hampshire
