= Back River Farm =

- U.S. National Register of Historic Places
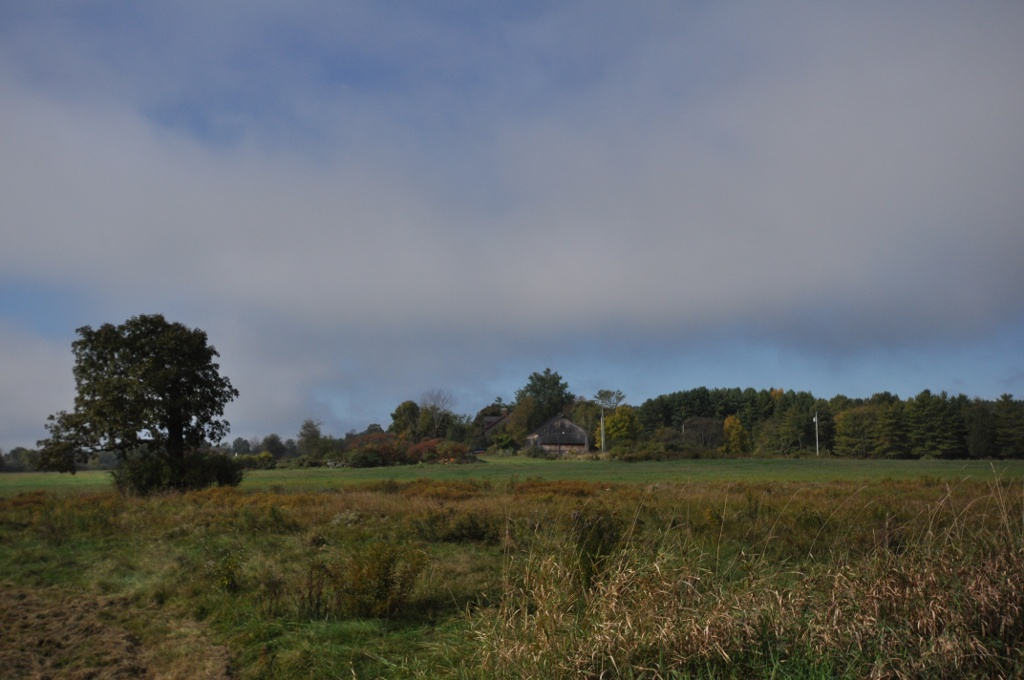

- Location within New Hampshire Location within the United States
- Location: Bay View Rd., Dover, New Hampshire
- Coordinates: 43°8′27″N 70°51′21″W
- Area: 44.3 acres (17.9 ha)
- Built: 1750
- NRHP reference No.: 84003236
- Added to NRHP: June 22, 1984

The Back River Farm, also known as the Samuel Emerson Farm, is a historic farmstead on Bay View Road in Dover, New Hampshire. The land along the Bellamy River (also known as the Back River) has been farmed since Samuel Emerson acquired 30 acres (12 ha) in the area in 1696, and is the only surviving period farmstead in the area. The farm, including a mid-18th century farmhouse, was listed on the National Register of Historic Places in 1984.

== Description and history ==
The Back River Farm consists of about 44 acres (18 ha) of land, roughly bounded by Bay View Road to the north, Bellamy Preserve to the east, and an inlet of the Bellamy River to the south. Most of this land is relatively flat, and in pasture. The farmstead stands on the south side of Bay View Road, screened from the road by trees, but with open views to the south. The house is a two-story timber frame construction, five bays wide, with a central chimney and a rear leanto section, giving the house a saltbox appearance. The house has interior woodworking features that embody both First Period work and early Georgian styling. This woodwork was probably done by the second Samuel Emerson, who described his profession as that of joiner.

In 1696 the first Samuel Emerson acquired 30 acres (12 ha) of land, and began farming. The area was in the 18th century mainly composed of this type of salt water farm, of which this is now the last surviving example. Emerson was brother to Hannah Duston, who became well known for her captivity narrative after being held captive by (and escaping from) Native Americans in 1697. The farm was owned by five generations of Emersons, growing to a size of 130 acres (53 ha). It was sold out of the family in 1876.

== See also ==
- National Register of Historic Places listings in Strafford County, New Hampshire
