= Dover Friends Meetinghouse =

Historic meetinghouse in New Hampshire, United States

- Dover Religious Society of Friends Meetinghouse
- U.S. National Register of Historic Places
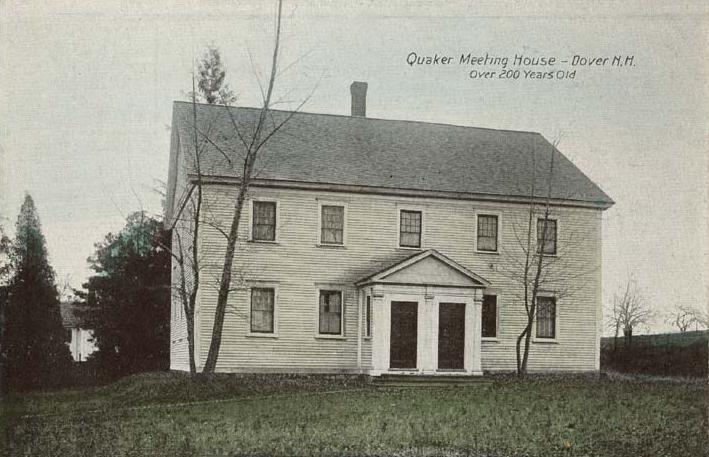
- Meetinghouse c. 1915

- Location within New Hampshire Location within the United States
- Location: 141 Central Ave., Dover, New Hampshire
- Coordinates: 43°11′12″N 70°52′25″W
- Area: less than one acre
- Built: 1768
- NRHP reference No.: 80000421
- Added to NRHP: February 29, 1980

The Dover Religious Society of Friends Meetinghouse is a historic Quaker meeting house at 141 Central Avenue (New Hampshire Route 108) in Dover, Strafford County, New Hampshire. Built in 1768 for a congregation established in the 17th century, it is the only surviving 18th-century Quaker meetinghouse in the state. The building was listed on the National Register of Historic Places in 1980.

== Description and history ==
The Dover Friends Meetinghouse is located south of downtown Dover on the east side of Central Avenue, nearly surrounded by elements of Pine Hill Cemetery. It is a two-story wood-frame structure, 50 feet (15 m) long and 37 feet (11 m) wide. A projecting vestibule with simple Greek Revival styling is a 19th-century alteration. Features distinctive to 18th-century Quaker meetinghouses include paired entrances on the long facade (for gender segregation), the removable partition wall at the center of the main chamber, and a crosswise bench for the congregation's elders.

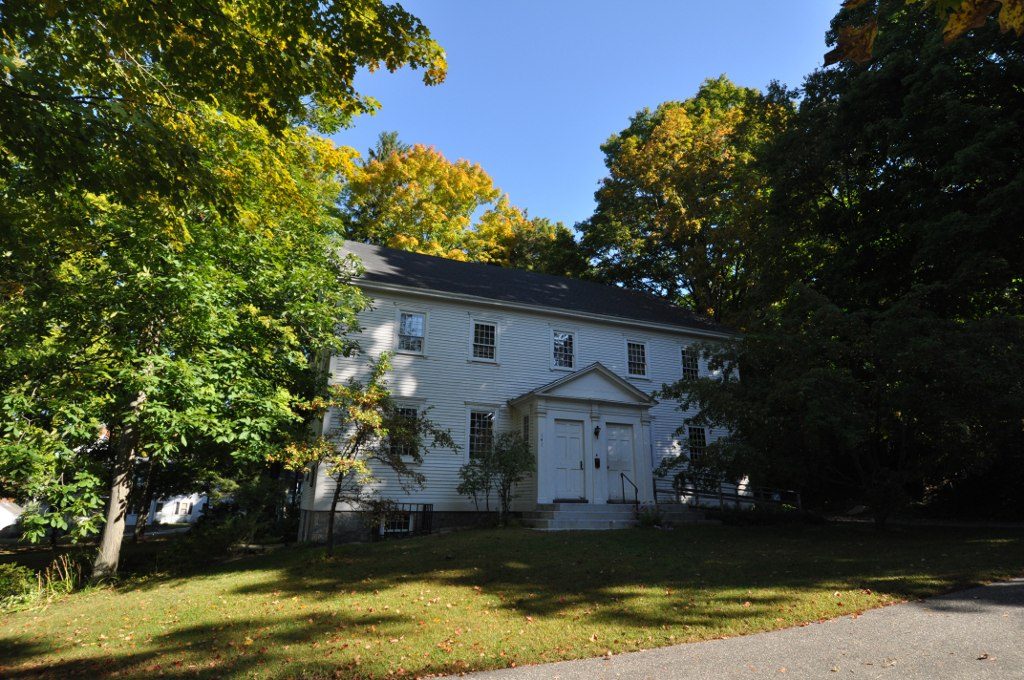

Quakers first began to arrive in the Dover area in 1662, and were met with strong resistance from the dominant Puritan authorities. They persisted, and had by 1680 established a congregation with a meetinghouse on Dover Neck. This meetinghouse, built in 1768, was that congregation's third. The Dover congregation became the "mother congregation" for a number of new ones established throughout New Hampshire and southwestern Maine. This building was the scene of regular worship until 1912, when dwindling membership prompted its closure. It continued to be maintained and used irregularly until 1955, when regular services began again.

== See also ==
- National Register of Historic Places listings in Strafford County, New Hampshire
