= Public Market (Dover, New Hampshire) =

- U.S. National Register of Historic Places
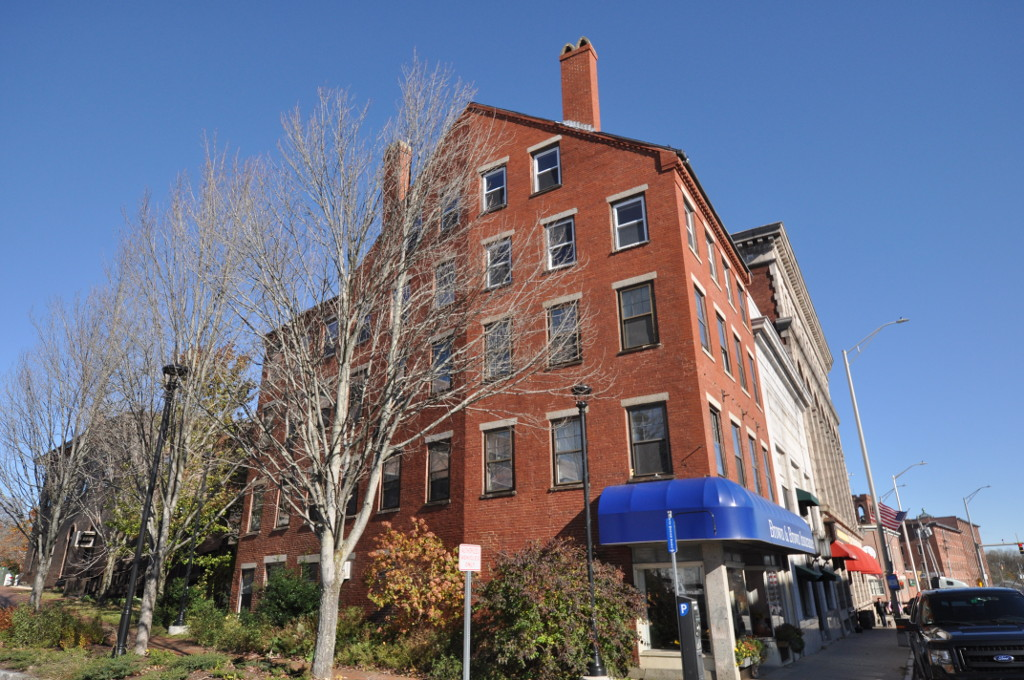

- Location within New Hampshire Location within the United States
- Location: 93 Washington St., Dover, New Hampshire
- Coordinates: 43°11′43″N 70°52′31″W
- Built: c. 1846
- Architect: Joseph Morrill
- Architectural style: Greek Revival
- NRHP reference No.: 85000541
- Added to NRHP: March 7, 1985

The Public Market, also referred to as the Morrill Block, is a historic commercial building at 93-95 Washington Street in Dover, New Hampshire. Built about 1846, it is one of the few surviving Greek Revival commercial buildings in the city, best known for its long association with the local Morrill Furniture Company. It was listed on the National Register of Historic Places in 1985.

== Description and history ==
The Public Market building is located at the western end of a series of commercial buildings in the heart of downtown Dover, extending along the north side of Washington Street from its junction with Central Avenue. It is a 4 1/2-story brick structure, topped by a gabled roof with end chimneys. Its main facade is four bays wide, with windows on the upper floors set in rectangular openings with stone lintels and sills. The cornice projects slightly, and is decorated by dentil brickwork. The ground floor has a commercial storefront that has been updated several times since the building's construction, largely obscuring the granite piers and lintels that frame it and the entrance to the upper floors. The storefront presently has plate glass display windows flanking a recessed entrance, and is sheltered by a modern awning.

The building dates to the mid-1840s, and was originally part of a more unified row of similar brick Greek Revival commercial buildings (in contrast to the stone buildings now to its east). It is one of the few commercial buildings in Dover to survive from the period. The building was apparently built by Stephen Toppan, a local master joiner who also owned it 1846-55. It was for many years the home of E. Morrill Furniture Company, a staple of the Dover downtown. Morrill's moved out of the building in the 1920s, at which time the upper floors were converted to apartments, and the present commercial front was installed on the ground floor. Tenants during the 20th century included a sweets shop, an Army-Navy store, and a meat market (called Public Market). It is presently occupied by an insurance agency.

== See also ==
- National Register of Historic Places listings in Strafford County, New Hampshire
