= Lehoullier Building =

- U.S. National Register of Historic Places
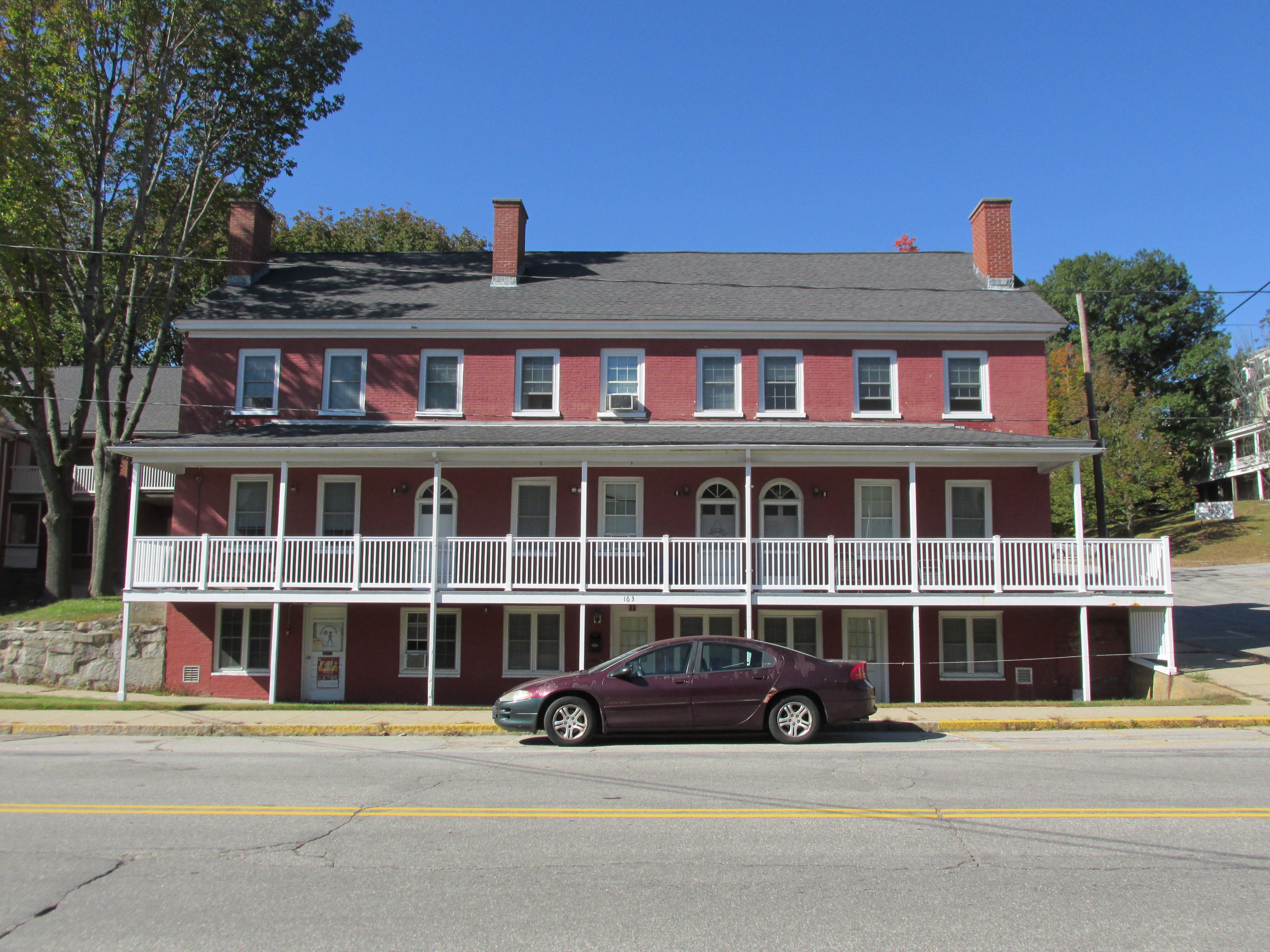

- Location within New Hampshire Location within the United States
- Location: 161-169 Main St., Somersworth, New Hampshire
- Coordinates: 43°15′31″N 70°51′46″W
- Area: 0.1 acres (0.040 ha)
- Built: 1843
- Architectural style: Greek Revival
- NRHP reference No.: 79000211
- Added to NRHP: December 26, 1979

The Lehoullier Building is a historic mill tenement house at 161-169 Main Street in Somersworth, New Hampshire. Built in 1843, it is one of two surviving tenement houses of the many that once lined Main Street near the Great Falls Manufacturing Company. The building was listed on the National Register of Historic Places in 1979.

== Description and history ==
The Lehoullier Building is located on the west side of Main Street, at its junction with Fayette Street. It is a brick building with a gabled roof and five irregularly placed chimneys. It is set on a sloping lot, presenting three stories to Main Street and two to the rear. It is nine bays wide, representing an original division into three separate townhouse-style units. Each unit has since been further subdivided into two units, for a total of six. The ground floor of each section has a center entrance flanked by paired sash windows. The second-floor units, accessed by a two-story porch, have entrances in either the left or right bay. A hip roof covers the porch, and there are smaller sash windows in the third floor bays.

The tenement was built by Thomas Parks and Job Harris c. 1843 under a grant from the Great Falls Manufacturing Company, which operated the major textile mills in Somersworth. It is one of two surviving tenement houses that once lined Main Street, and is, along with the mills themselves, one of the few surviving reminders of the city's textile manufacturing past. During the 20th century, the building underwent a number of alterations, many of which have since been reversed by restoration. The ground-floor spaces were adapted for commercial use, and the upper-floor exteriors were rearranged to provide access to the upper units from the back of the building.

== See also ==
- National Register of Historic Places listings in Strafford County, New Hampshire
