= Garrison Hill Park and Tower =

United States historic place

- Garrison Hill Tower
- U.S. National Register of Historic Places
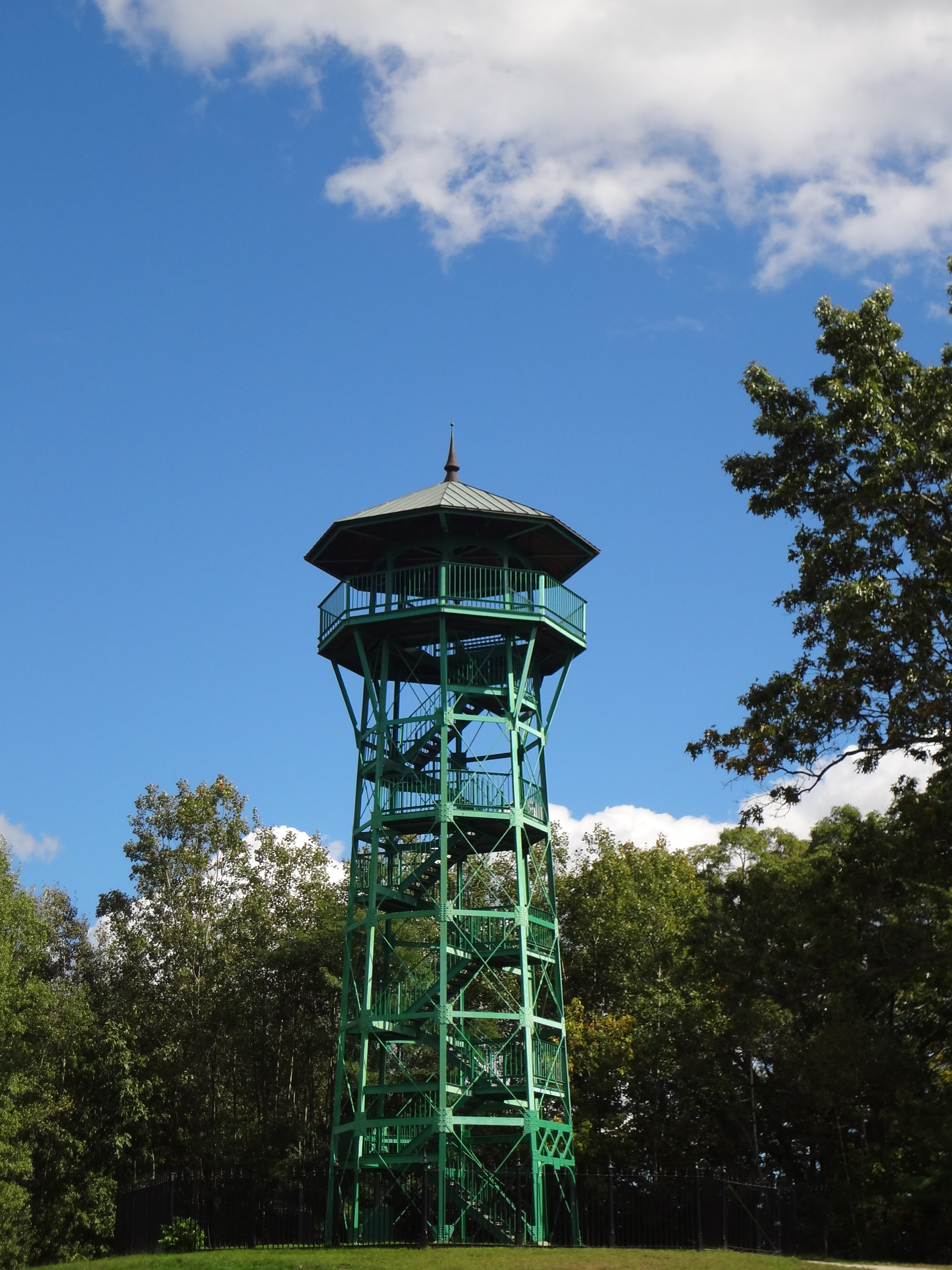
- Garrison Hill Tower photographed from Garrison Hill

- Location within New Hampshire Location within the United States
- Location: Abbey Sawyer Memorial Dr., Dover, New Hampshire
- Coordinates: 43°12′34″N 70°52′13″W
- Area: 8.5 acres (3.4 ha)
- Built: 1993
- NRHP reference No.: 87001413
- Added to NRHP: September 11, 1987

Garrison Hill Tower is a 76-foot-tall (23 m) observatory atop Garrison Hill in Dover, New Hampshire, United States. The current tower, made of iron and painted green, was built in 1993 and is the third tower to exist on the hill. The park in which it stands is listed on the National Register of Historic Places.

== Setting ==
Garrison Hill Park is located north of downtown Dover, on the east side of New Hampshire Route 9. It is a glacial drumlin that is roughly circular in shape, with a summit elevation of 298 feet (91 m). The park occupies about 8.5 acres (3.4 ha) around the summit, and is accessed via Abbie Sawyer Memorial Drive. The road leads to a parking area at the summit, providing access to the observation tower, a town-owned concrete water storage tank, and radio transmission towers. There is a community garden located at the top of the hill which is open to the public.

== History ==
In 1880, the top of Garrison Hill was purchased by Joseph Ham and Harrison Haley, who developed it as a public park. Haley purchased a 65-foot-high (20 m) wooden observatory, for $1000, designed by architect B. D. Stewart and opened it to the public. The observatory contained a restaurant in the base, and offered a telescope through which the public could view Mount Washington. The city acquired the property in 1888 and continued to operate it as a public park. The city also built a reservoir (since filled in) on the site.

After the wooden observatory burned down in 1911, Abbey Sawyer commissioned a replacement, made of steel, to honor her husband. She also funded the construction of a new roadway (the present Abbey Sawyer Memorial Drive) to the summit, replacing the 1880 carriage road (now a footpath). The tower, erected in 1913, was taken down in 1990 due to safety concerns, and a third tower (the one now standing) was built by volunteers. On a clear day, one can view the White Mountains and the Isles of Shoals from atop the tower.

In 2023, local welder and snowboarder Lane Knaack was commissioned by the City of Dover to build three terrain park features for the Public "Snow Park."

== See also ==
- National Register of Historic Places listings in Strafford County, New Hampshire
