= Green Street School =

Historic school building in Somersworth, New Hampshire

- U.S. National Register of Historic Places
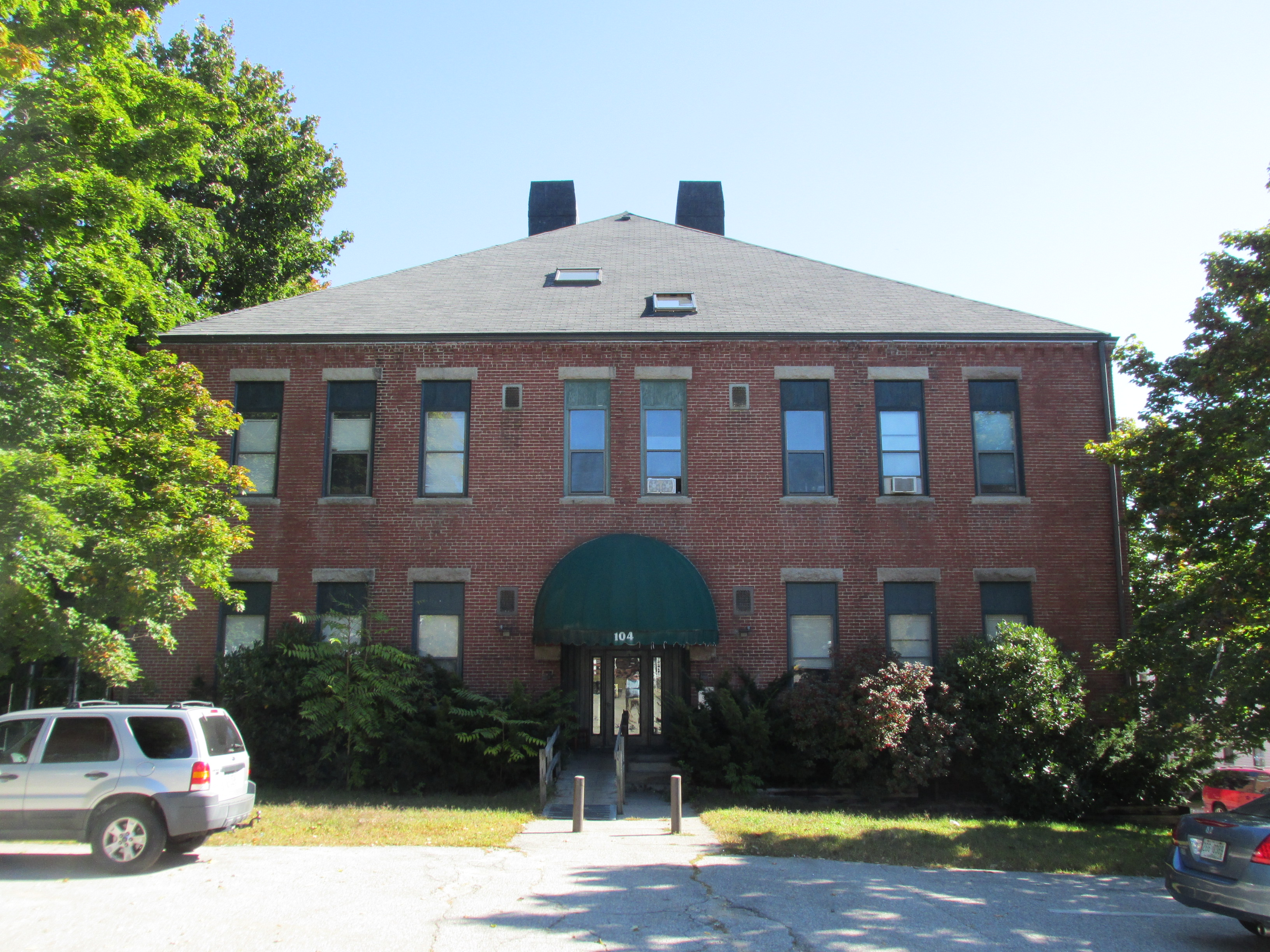

- Location within New Hampshire Location within the United States
- Location: 104 Green St., Somersworth, New Hampshire
- Coordinates: 43°15′21″N 70°51′46″W
- Area: 0.5 acres (0.20 ha)
- Built: 1890
- Architectural style: Colonial Revival, Vernacular Colonial Revival
- NRHP reference No.: 85000481
- Added to NRHP: March 7, 1985

The Green Street School is a historic school building at 104 Green Street in Somersworth, New Hampshire. Built in 1890–91, it is the city's oldest surviving school, and a prominent feature of its urban core. It was converted into residences in 1983–84, and was listed on the National Register of Historic Places in 1985.

== Description and history ==
The Green Street School is located in a densely built residential area south of the commercial business district of Somersworth, on a lot bounded by Union, Green, and School streets. It is a large brick-and-granite structure sited at the top of a hill in a residential neighborhood. Its setting and the slope of its steeply pitched roof serve to make it appear oversized. It is two stories in height, with a hip roof that has gabled wall dormers on its long faces. Its principal facade faces west toward Union Street, and has eight bays. The center two bays on the ground floor house the main building entrance in a round-arch opening, while the remaining bays have rectangular sash windows with stone sills and lintels. The main roof cornice exhibits Queen Anne style brick corbelling. This building is the only surviving example of this architectural style in Somersworth.

The school was built in 1890–91. It is the oldest school building in the city. It served as a public school until 1927, and as a parochial high school from 1934 until c. 1970, when the city again assumed ownership of the building. It was built to serve a largely immigrant French-Canadian population settled in the surrounding neighborhood.

== See also ==
- National Register of Historic Places listings in Strafford County, New Hampshire
