= Farmington Town Pound =

- U.S. National Register of Historic Places
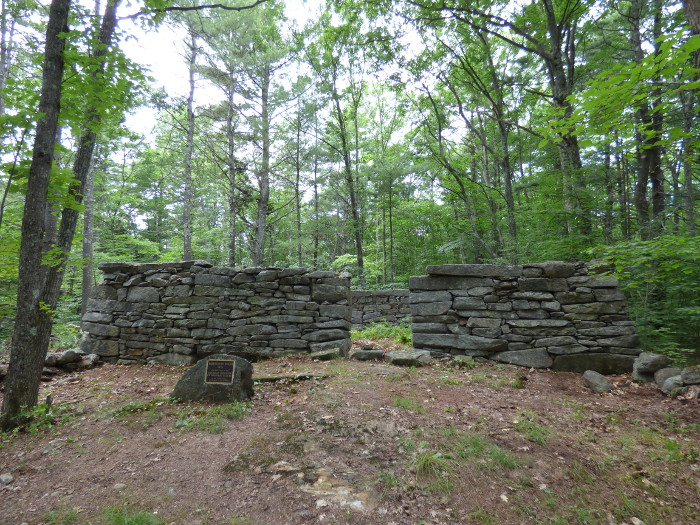

- Location within New Hampshire Location within the United States
- Location: NW side of Pound Rd. 300 ft. north of the jct. of Ten Rod Rd., Farmington, New Hampshire
- Coordinates: 43°21′33″N 71°4′49″W
- Area: 0.4 acres (0.16 ha)
- Built: 1823
- Built by: Colbath, Nicholas
- NRHP reference No.: 93000884
- Added to NRHP: September 2, 1993

The Farmington Town Pound is a historic animal pound in Farmington, New Hampshire. It is located on the north side of Pound Road near its intersection with Ten Rod Road. Built in 1823, it is one of the best-preserved 19th-century pounds in southeastern New Hampshire, and is now maintained by the Farmington Historical Society. It was listed on the National Register of Historic Places in 1993.

== Description and history ==
The Farmington Town Pound is located near the geographic center of the roughly square town, on the northwest side of Pound Road north of its junction with Ten Rod Road. The pound is a stone structure 40 feet (12 m) square, consisting of four walls made of dry-laid fieldstone about 7 feet (2.1 m) high and 3 feet (0.91 m) wide at the base. The walls are topped with long granite capstones. There is an opening about 5.5 feet (1.7 m) wide on the south side, facing Pound Road, which once had a granite lintel stone over the top, but this has fallen.

From the early 18th century, towns in New Hampshire were required to fund the construction and maintenance of a structure in which to pen stray livestock until it could be claimed by its owner. The early structures were typically of wood, and none of those are known to survive. This pound was built in 1823 by the town, replacing an earlier wooden structure built in 1802, and is one of a few well-preserved pounds in southeastern New Hampshire. It was built by Nicholas Colbath for $59, and was located on land purchased by the town from Hunkin Colbath for $5. It remained in use until late in the 19th century, and was sold into private hands in 1918. It was given back to the town, and is now maintained by the Farmington Historical Society.

== Gallery ==
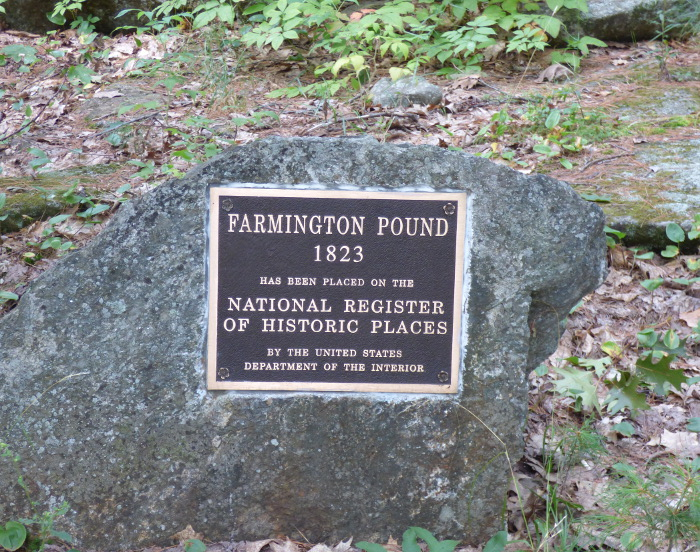
Historic marker at the Farmington Town Pound site.

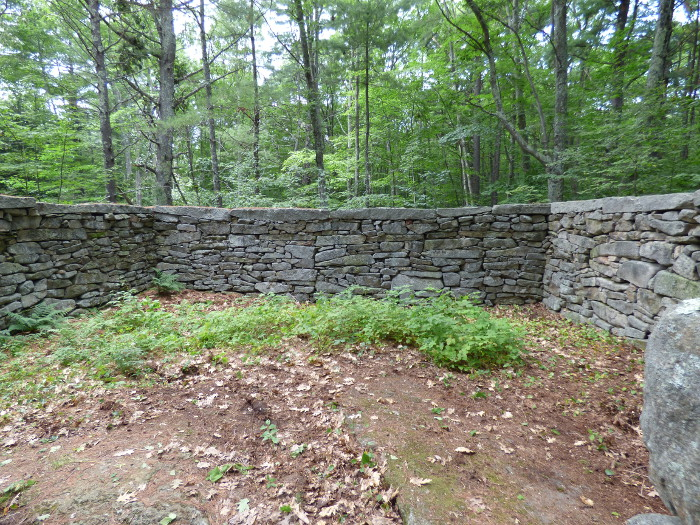
A look inside of the Farmington Town Pound

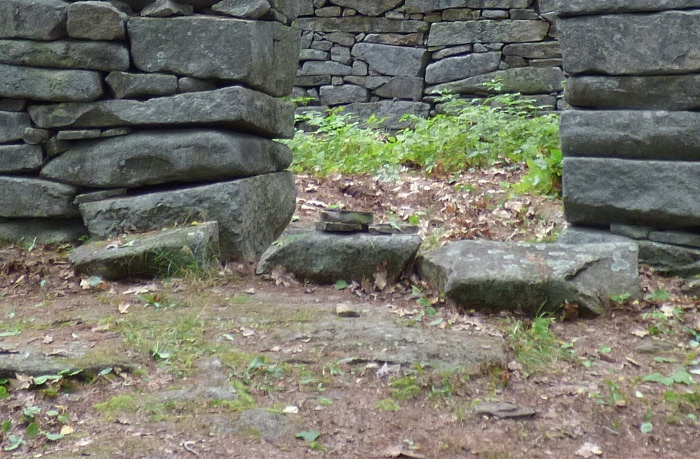
The fallen lintel stone lies just in front of the entrance to the Farmington Town Pound.

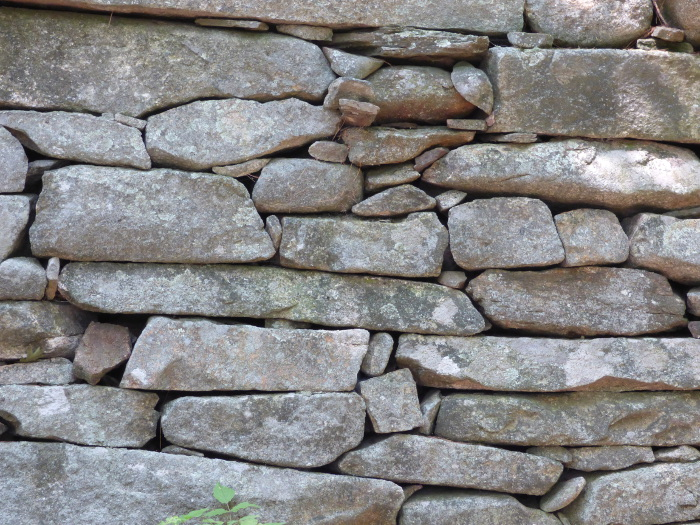
Farmington Town Pound stone wall detail.

== See also ==
- National Register of Historic Places listings in Strafford County, New Hampshire
