= Canaan Chapel =

Historic church in New Hampshire, United States

- U.S. National Register of Historic Places
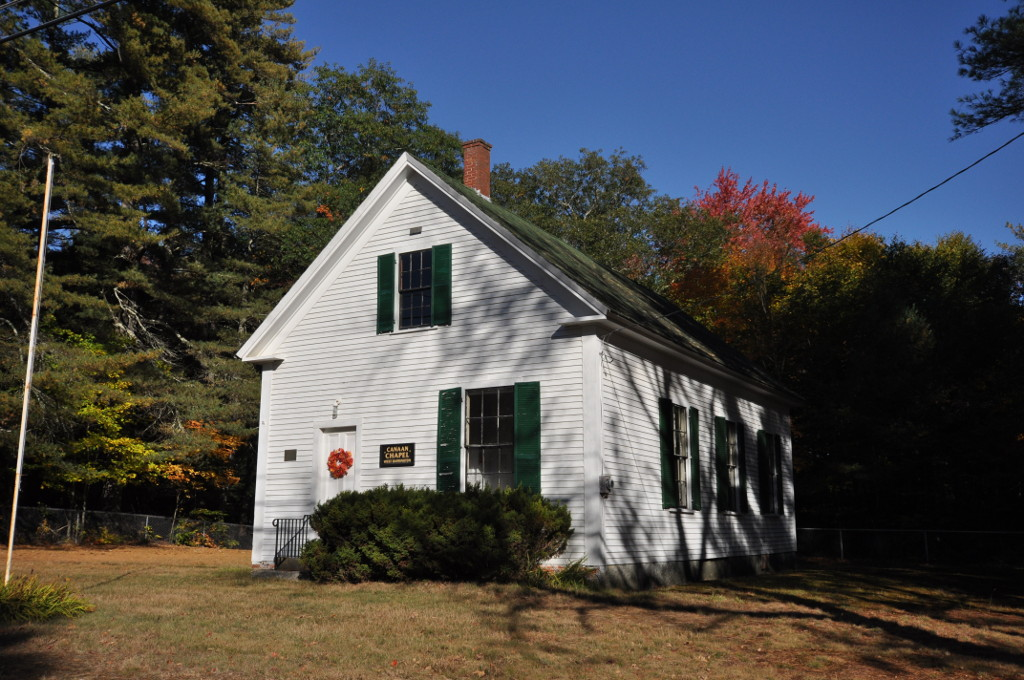

- Location within New Hampshire Location within the United States
- Location: Canaan Rd., Barrington, New Hampshire
- Coordinates: 43°12′16″N 71°6′7″W
- Area: 0.5 acres (0.20 ha)
- Built: 1881
- Architect: Perry, John Hill
- Architectural style: Greek Revival
- NRHP reference No.: 82001877
- Added to NRHP: March 11, 1982

The Canaan Chapel (also known as Canaan Free Will Baptist Church) is a historic chapel on Canaan Road in Barrington, New Hampshire. Built in 1881, it is a typical example of a rural Free Will Baptist church of the mid-19th century, exhibiting modest elements of Greek Revival design despite a late construction date for that style. The building was listed on the National Register of Historic Places in 1982.

== Description and history ==
The Canaan Chapel is located in western Barrington, on the north side of Canaan Road (United States Route 202) at its junction with Canaan Back Road. It is a single-story wood-frame structure, with a gable roof, clapboard exterior, and stone foundation. The interior of the building consists of a vestibule, with a small room off to the right, and an auditorium space measuring about 24 by 32 feet (7.3 by 9.8 m). There is a raised stage at the far end, at whose center stands a raised pulpit. An 1890 organ manufactured by the Boston Organ Company occupies the corner to the left of the pulpit. Most of the room is occupied by the original pews. The property includes a c. 1898 horse shed.

The chapel was built in 1881, and is one of a small number of surviving area Free Will Baptist churches of the period. The Free Will Baptist denomination was founded in nearby New Durham in 1780, and spread through the rural communities of eastern New Hampshire. Most of the surviving churches of the group were built in the mid-19th century; this one is a particularly rare late example, but it exhibits modest elements of the Greek Revival also found on older buildings. The building has been little altered; the main alteration has been the introduction of electricity (including conversion of the original chandelier), and the replacement of the wood stove.

== See also ==
- National Register of Historic Places listings in Strafford County, New Hampshire
