= Rochester Commercial and Industrial District =

Historic district in New Hampshire, United States

- U.S. National Register of Historic Places
- U.S. Historic district
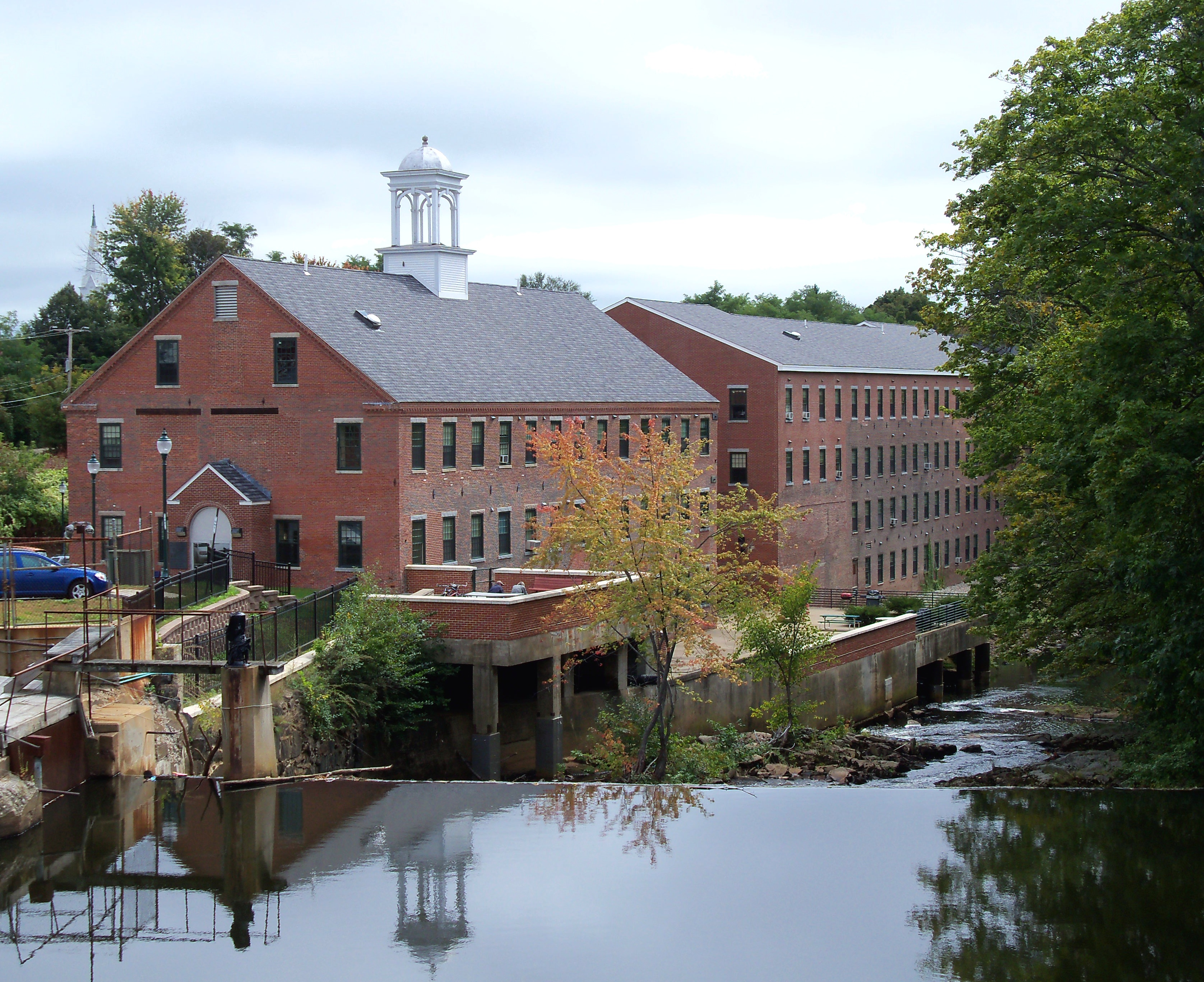
- Mill complex along the Cocheco River in Rochester

- Location within New Hampshire Location within the United States
- Location: N. Main, Wakefield, Hanson, S. Main Sts. and Central Square, Rochester, New Hampshire
- Coordinates: 43°18′11″N 70°58′34″W
- Area: 6 acres (2.4 ha)
- Architectural style: Late 19th And 20th Century Revivals, Late Victorian, Early Commercial
- NRHP reference No.: 83001154
- Added to NRHP: April 8, 1983

The Rochester Commercial and Industrial District encompasses the civic, commercial, and industrial heart of Rochester, New Hampshire. Oriented around the city's Central Square, the 6-acre (2.4 ha) district includes the city's major civic buildings, most of which are Classical Revival structures from the early 20th century, a number of commercial buildings dating as far back as the square's formation in the 1820s, and several late 19th-century industrial facilities. The district extends primarily along Main Street, from Bridge and Union Streets to Winter and Academy Streets, and includes properties extending along Wakefield and Hanson Streets, as well as other adjacent streets. The district was listed on the National Register of Historic Places in 1983.

== Description and history ==
Rochester was chartered as a town in 1722, but substantive colonial settlement did not take place until conflicts with Native Americans subsided in the mid-18th century. The town was a center for lumber trade, and became a transportation hub, with the intersection of two stagecoach routes at what is now Central Square. In the 19th century it developed as a center of the textile and shoe industries, contributing to the state's nationwide prominence in the latter industry at the end of the century. Between 1797 and 1840 it was the county seat of Strafford County. The introduction of the railroad in 1849 continued the city's importance in transportation.

The city's downtown is largely a product of late 19th and early 20th-century development, although there are surviving elements representative of its earlier importance. A few residences and commercial buildings dating to the 1820s are found on North Main Street, northwest of Central Square, interspersed with later 19th-century and modern infill. The Central Square area, the junction of North Main, South Main, and Wakefield Streets, is ringed with late 19th and early 20th-century commercial buildings, mostly of brick construction. Civic and religious buildings are also found along Main Street, including a courthouse, city hall, and churches. The city's 19th-century industrial heritage is remembered in the four-story factory building of E.W. Wallace, its major shoe manufacturer, at 100 South Main Street.

== See also ==
- National Register of Historic Places listings in Strafford County, New Hampshire
