= Richard Hayes House =

Historic house in New Hampshire, United States

- U.S. National Register of Historic Places
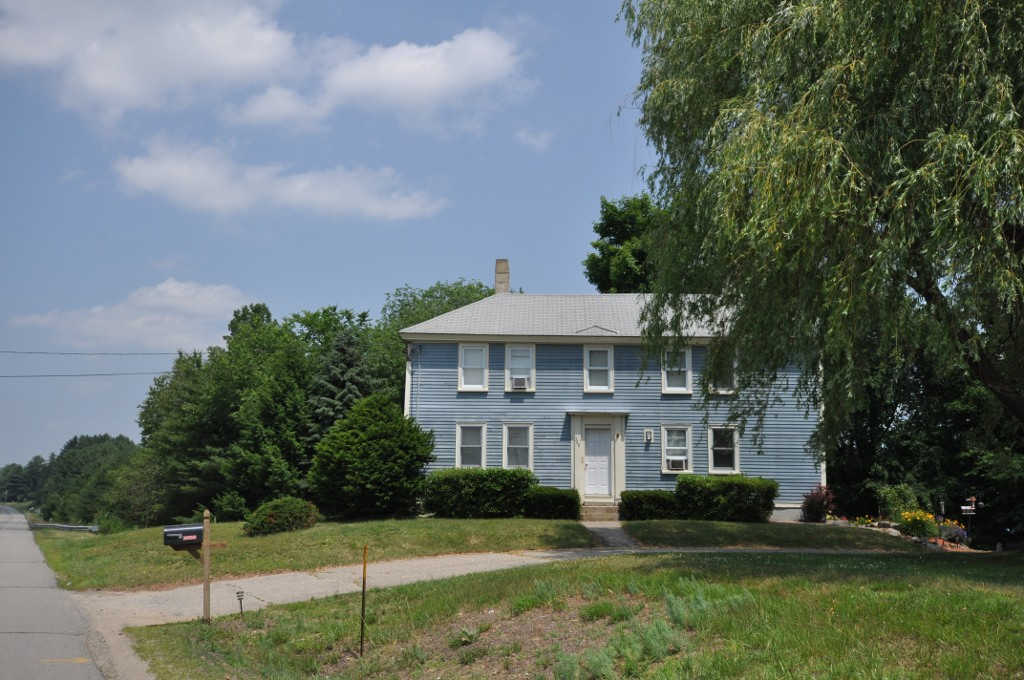

- Location within New Hampshire Location within the United States
- Location: 184 Gonic Rd., Rochester, New Hampshire
- Coordinates: 43°15′38″N 70°58′44″W
- Area: 2.6 acres (1.1 ha)
- Built: 1787
- Built by: Hayes, Richard
- Architectural style: Federal, Vernacular Federal
- NRHP reference No.: 86000283
- Added to NRHP: February 27, 1986

The Richard Hayes House is a historic house at 326 Gonic Road (New Hampshire Route 125) in southern Rochester, New Hampshire. Built in 1787, it is a rare surviving Federal period house in the city. It was listed on the National Register of Historic Places in 1986.

== Description and history ==
The Richard Hayes House stands in a semi-rural setting in southern Rochester, on the east side of Gonic Road just north of its junction with Colonial Drive. It is an L-shaped wood-frame structure, two stories tall, which presents two public facades, apparently part of its original design. Its appearance is of two wings, each five bays wide, that are joined at a right angle. Each wing has a gable roof with the ridge parallel to its facade, giving the house roof a half-hipped appearance. The house is a rare well-preserved vernacular Federal style structure in Rochester.

The house was built in 1787 by Richard Hayes, a native of Madbury. The house's design is unusual because houses of this type are usually built in two stages, while in this one it is clear from its construction that the design is original. It is similar to that of the original homestead in Madbury where Hayes grew up. The house was built on 80 acres (32 ha) of land given to Richard by his father Daniel, a prominent landowner and politician. The house remained in the Hayes family until 1881.

== See also ==
- National Register of Historic Places listings in Strafford County, New Hampshire
