= United States Post Office (Dover, New Hampshire) =

- U.S. Post Office-Dover Main
- U.S. National Register of Historic Places
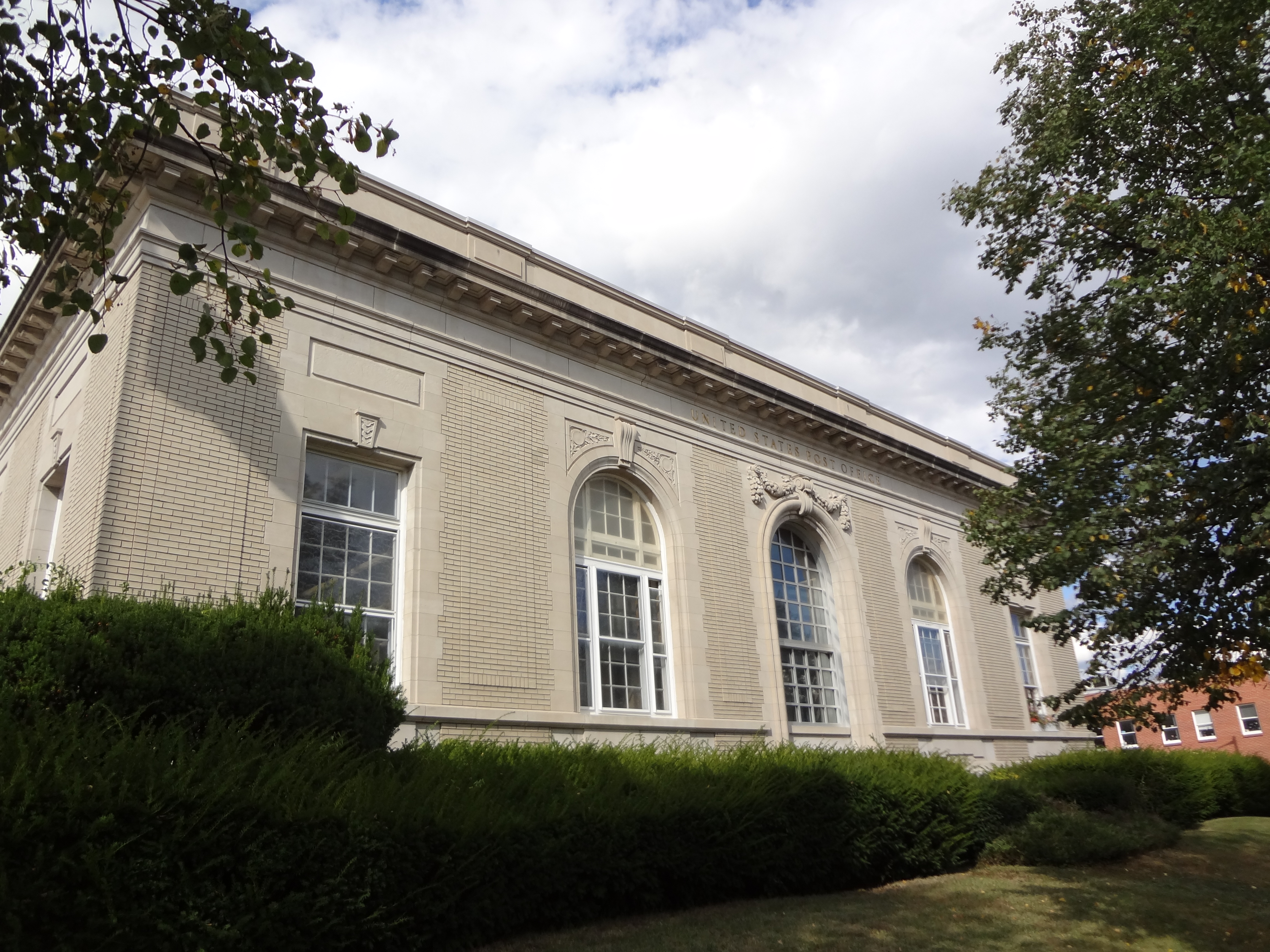

- Location within New Hampshire Location within the United States
- Location: 133-137 Washington St., Dover, New Hampshire
- Coordinates: 43°11′42″N 70°52′39″W
- Area: 1.3 acres (0.53 ha)
- Built: 1911
- Architect: Taylor, James K.
- Architectural style: Beaux Arts
- NRHP reference No.: 86002273
- Added to NRHP: July 17, 1986

The U.S. Post Office-Dover Main is a historic post office building at 133-137 Washington Street in the center of Dover, New Hampshire, United States. Built in 1911, and enlarged in the 1960s and 1970s, it is one of the region's only examples of Beaux Arts architecture. The building was listed on the National Register of Historic Places in 1986.

== Description and history ==
Dover's main post office occupies an entire city block in its downtown area, bounded by Washington, Green, Fayette, and Chestnut Streets. The building has three parts: the original 1911 main building, a large addition on the north side, and an expanded loading dock on the west side. The main portion of the building, a single-story beige brick Beaux Arts structure, was designed by James Knox Taylor and completed in 1911. The original main entrance, facing Washington Street, has been closed off, and some of the building's original features (such as stone parapet and the original front steps with lampposts) have been removed.

A major addition in 1963 expanded the work area to the rear and relocated the public lobby space and postmaster's office. The original portion has a hipped tin roof, while the addition, attached to its southwest, has a flat asphalt roof. The original interior lobby spaces, originally richly decorated, also lost those finishes in the renovations. Despite these alterations, the building exterior retains most of its Beaux Arts features, and is one of the few examples of this architectural style in southeastern New Hampshire.

== See also ==
- National Register of Historic Places listings in Strafford County, New Hampshire
