= Jenness Farm =

Historic house in New Hampshire, United States

- U.S. National Register of Historic Places
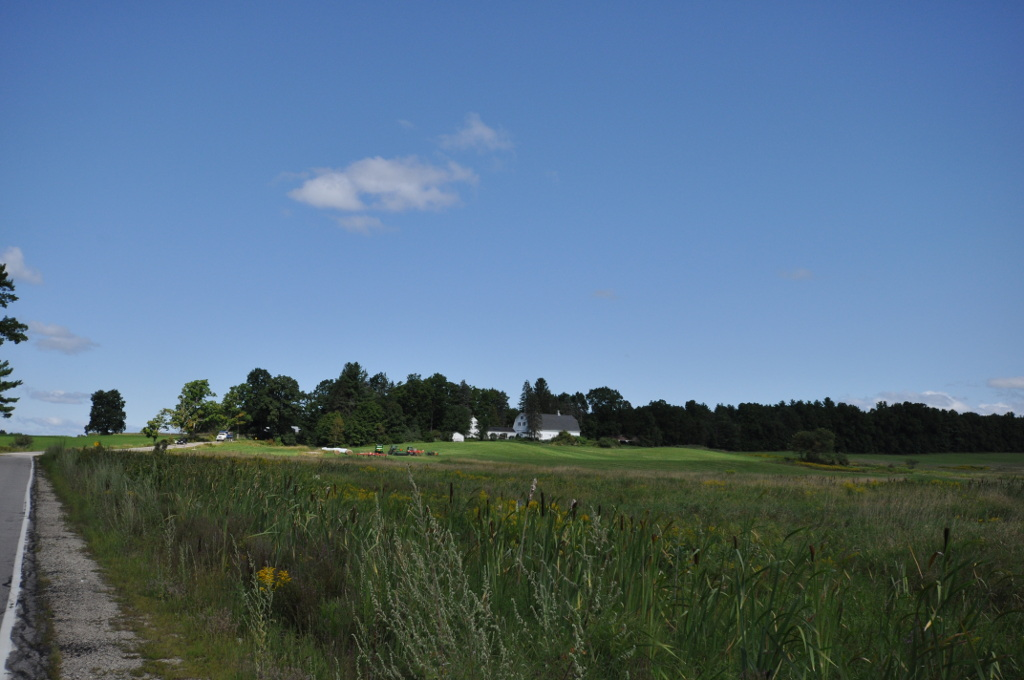

- Location within New Hampshire Location within the United States
- Location: 626 Pickering Rd., Rochester, New Hampshire
- Coordinates: 43°14′36″N 70°56′12″W
- Area: 192 acres (78 ha)
- Built: 1935
- Architectural style: Colonial Revival
- NRHP reference No.: 01000206
- Added to NRHP: March 2, 2001

The Jenness Farm is a historic farm property at 626 Pickering Road in Rochester, New Hampshire. It consists of about 190 acres (77 ha) in Rochester and adjacent Dover, and has been in continuous ownership by the Jenness family since 1837. It was, at the time of its 2001 listing on the National Register of Historic Places, one of just ten farms in the city with intact land and buildings.

== Description and history ==
The Jenness Farm is located on the northeast side of Pickering Road in southernmost Rochester and northwestern Dover. Most of its 192 acres (78 ha) are located in Dover, with the farmstead complex located in Rochester, south of Shady Hill Drive. About 3/4 of the farm acreage is east of Pickering Road, with the balance to its west. The main house is a Colonial Revival structure built in 1935, replacing a c. 1890s farmhouse that burned in 1934. It is oriented facing south, with a rear ell joining it to a barn of similar vintage.

The land that now makes up Jenness Farm was acquired in 1837 by Cyrus Jenness, and is substantially all of the land he acquired. His primary focus was a dairy operation, but he also raised potatoes and had an apple orchard. His son, D.F. Jenness, built the 1890s farmstead and continued the dairy operation. He acquired cows that could be raised for both beef and dairy, and diversified the farm's crops. At the time of the 1934 fire that destroyed his farmstead, Jenness was one of more than 130 farmers in Rochester. He rebuilt, using the existing foundations to build the present farmstead. His successors, Edith and Charles Teague, expanded the farm's poultry operation, as a tightening of dairy handling regulations led to a reduction in milk production. Intensive agricultural use of the land ended in the 1970s; it is now used for hay production and tree farming, and remains with Jenness's descendants.

== See also ==
- National Register of Historic Places listings in Strafford County, New Hampshire
