= James M. Jenness =

American businessman (born 1946)

James M. Jenness (born 1946) is the chairman of the board and former CEO of the Kellogg Company, succeeding Carlos Gutierrez after President George W. Bush nominated Gutierrez to become Secretary of Commerce on November 29, 2004. Jenness was CEO until December 31, 2006, when he was succeeded by David MacKay.

A native of Chicago, Illinois, Jenness received a bachelor's degree in marketing and an MBA from DePaul University. He was a long-time employee of the Leo Burnett advertising agency, eventually becoming vice-chairman and chief operating officer. In 1997, Jenness left Leo Burnett to become CEO of the retail consultancy Integrated Merchandising Systems in Chicago. He resigned as its CEO upon being named CEO at Kellogg.

Although regarded by some as an outsider to Kellogg, Jenness has had a long association with the company. His first assignment at Leo Burnett in 1974 was an advertising campaign for the Special K brand of cereal. Since then, he worked on campaigns for most of Kellogg's brands. He was named to Kellogg's board of directors in July 2000.
