= United States Post Office (Somersworth, New Hampshire) =

- U.S. Post Office-Somersworth Main
- U.S. National Register of Historic Places
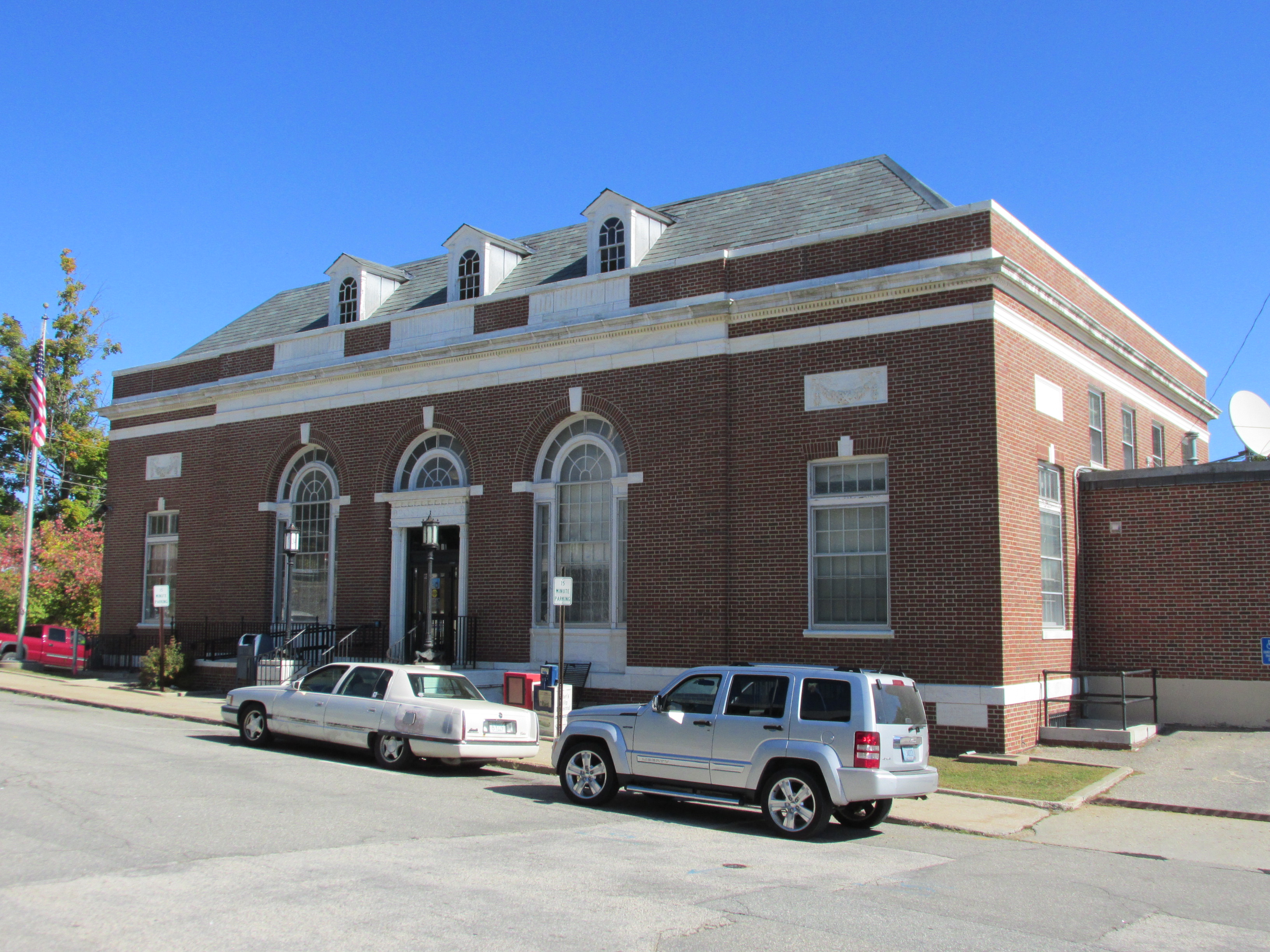

- Location within New Hampshire Location within the United States
- Location: 2 Government Way, Somersworth, New Hampshire
- Coordinates: 43.2625°N 70.8641°W
- Area: 0.3 acres (0.12 ha)
- Built: 1931
- Architect: Office of the Supervising Architect under James A. Wetmore, N.H. Turnbull
- Architectural style: Colonial Revival, Georgian Revival
- NRHP reference No.: 86002246
- Added to NRHP: July 17, 1986

The U.S. Post Office-Somersworth Main is the main post office of Somersworth, New Hampshire. Located at 2 Government Way in downtown Somersworth, it is a Georgian Revival building completed in 1931 to a design by the Office of the Supervising Architect under James A. Wetmore. The building was listed on the National Register of Historic Places in 1986.

== Description and history ==
The Somersworth Post Office is located in the heart of downtown Somersworth, at the junction of Government Way and Fore Street. It is a single-story structure finished in brick with marble trim. It has a hip roof with three marble dormers over the central portion of the main facade. The entry is detailed with fluted Ionic pilasters with a recessed fan window, a form which is repeated in the flanking windows. The main lobby is finished with orange quarry tile flooring and marble wainscoting, with wood trim around the windows and plaster walls. Original frosted-globe light fixtures (still visible in the basement) have been removed in favor of more efficient fluorescent lighting.

The building was designed by James A. Wetmore and completed in 1931. It was built as part of a program by the federal government to make more of a presence in smaller communities. The basic form of this building is one of a standard series of designs developed by the Postal Service, but its exterior details were designed for this site by Wetmore.

== See also ==
- National Register of Historic Places listings in Strafford County, New Hampshire
