= Cocheco Mills =

- U.S. National Register of Historic Places
- U.S. Historic district
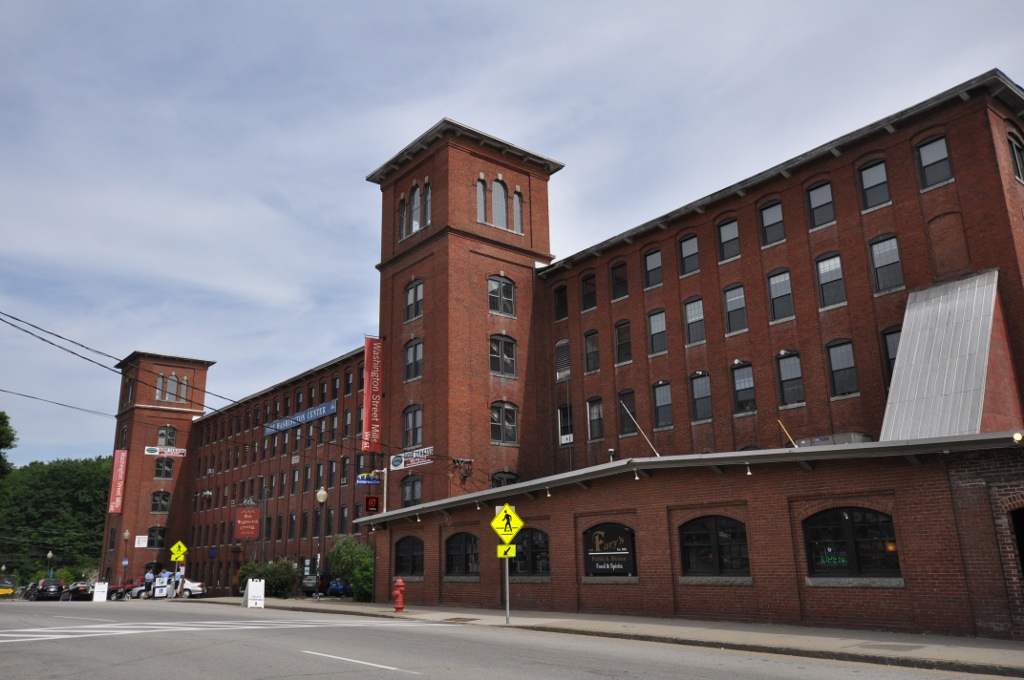
- Mill #1

- Location within New Hampshire Location within the United States
- Location: Main and Washington Sts., Dover, New Hampshire
- Coordinates: 43°11′44″N 70°52′23″W
- Area: 11.5 acres (4.7 ha)
- Built: 1822
- Architect: Multiple
- NRHP reference No.: 14000081
- Added to NRHP: March 26, 2014

The Cocheco Mills comprise a historic mill complex in the heart of Dover, New Hampshire. The mills occupy a bend in the Cochecho River that has been site of cotton textile manufacturing since at least 1823, when the Dover Manufacturing Company supplanted earlier sawmills and gristmills. The present mill buildings were built between the 1880s and the early 20th century, and were listed on the National Register of Historic Places in 2014.

== Description ==
The surviving elements of the mill complex are six major manufacturing buildings, the dam and wheel house which diverted water to the mills, a steel bridge, and the smokestack and remains of the boiler house of the complex.

=== Dam, wheel house and bridge ===
The dam stretches across the Cochecho River in a broad arc roughly west of mills #2 and #3. It is made of rough-cut granite ashlar, and stands between 9 and 150 feet in height. It has a modern concrete spillway. The dam was built sometime between 1905 and 1925, replacing an earlier dam. The wheel house stands east of mill #2, and is a small single-story brick structure built on a concrete arch which spans the space between mill #2 and the river. The bridge is a steel truss structure spanning the river west of mill #3. Probably built in the 1880s, it has wooden decking and a decorative balustrade.

=== Mills ===
There are four main mill buildings in the complex. The #1 mill is a five-story brick building located south of Washington Street. It was built in 1908 after the previous #1 mill was destroyed by fire; portions of the older structure that survived the fire were supposedly reused in its construction. The 1880 #2 mill marks the northern end of the complex, and is located between Main Street and Central Avenue. It is a four-story brick structure, and is joined at the south end to mill #3, which was built in 1881 and actually spans the river. An L-shaped extension added in 1909 replaced the old #4 mill. The #5 mill, built in 1825, is the oldest surviving element in the complex. Originally 25 bays in length, a portion of the building was demolished in the mid-20th century, leaving the present 10 bays. It has a distinctive Gothic Revival tower to which a belfry was added in the 1850s.

=== Picker houses ===
There are two picker houses, both built between 1905 and 1925. The #1 house is adjacent to the #1 mill at the south end of the complex. It is a brick structure three stories tall and roughly 12 bays long and 8 wide. It is joined to the #1 mill by a pair of two-story enclosed bridges. The #2 house is at the north end of the complex; it is a brick structure three stories tall, although because of the site topography one facade only shows two stories. Also 12 by 8 bays in dimension, it was once connected by an enclosed bridge to mill #2, but this has been removed.

== History ==
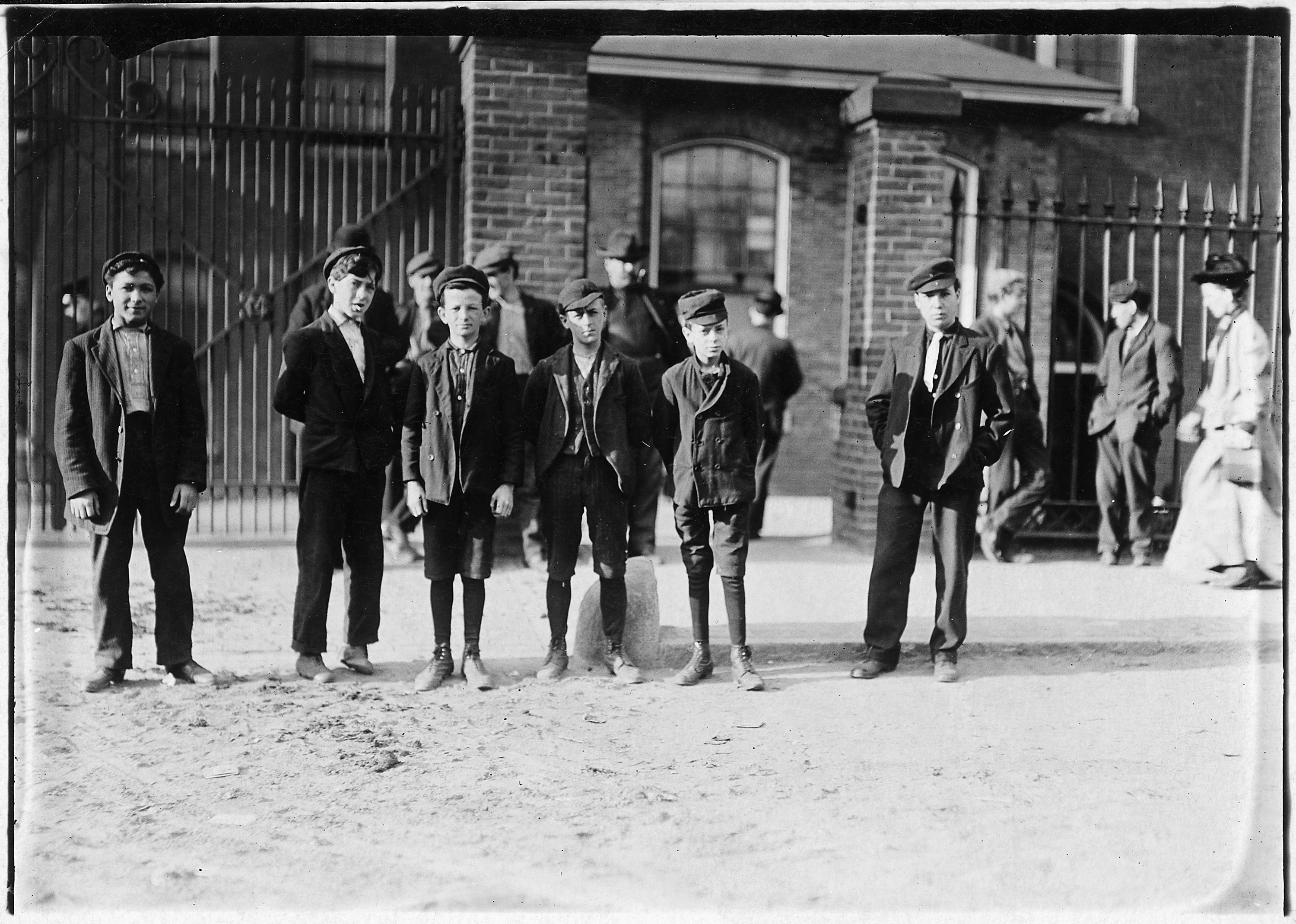
Child laborers at the Cocheco Manufacturing Company in 1909. Photograph by Lewis Hine.

Cotton textile manufacturing began on the Cochecho River with the Dover Cotton Factory, built in 1815 about two miles upstream at "Upper Factory" village. In 1823 it was renamed the Dover Manufacturing Company and reestablished at Cochecho Falls, but was not successful. In 1827 a new company, the Cocheco Manufacturing Company, was established with a capital of $1,500,000, but as historian Caroline Harwood Garland writes in 1897, "By an error of the engrossing clerk in the act of incorporation, the old Indian name, Cochecho, became Cocheco." Another historian, Alonzo Hall Quint, would comment, "The chief fault of the present Company is their barbarous spelling of 'Cocheco' instead of 'Cochecho,' for which no possible excuse exists.". Here in 1834 was one of the first textile mill strikes "in which women participated virtually alone." It lasted three days, prompted by a reduction in their pay.

By 1898, the Cocheco Manufacturing Company covered over 30-acres of floor pace, operated 130,000 spindles in 2,800 looms, and employed 2000 workers earning an average wage of 53 cents a day, six days a week. Housed in 15 buildings, the Cocheco Print Works produced over 65,000,000 yards of finished cloth a year. "Work in the mills was dirty, monotonous and loud," writes author Mark A. Leno, Jr. Then in 1909 the plant was purchased by Pacific Mill Works of Lawrence, Massachusetts, which in 1911 petitioned the US Board on Geographic Names to drop the river's historic spelling Cochecho and substitute the mill's spelling Cocheco. The manufacture of cotton textiles continued as before, but Pacific removed the Print Works machinery to its headquarters in Lawrence, and the buildings of the Print Works, built in 1842–1843, were torn down in 1913. Where they stood is now Henry Law Park.

Competition from textile processors in the American South, unburdened by the North's heating costs, combined with the effects of the Great Depression, led Pacific to shutter the complex in 1937. The city purchased the complex at auction in 1941. The buildings have since been home to a succession of smaller enterprises, primarily engaged in manufacturing. The buildings also house offices, restaurants, breweries and bars.

== See also ==
- National Register of Historic Places listings in Strafford County, New Hampshire
