= U.S. Post Office-Peterborough Main =

- U.S. National Register of Historic Places
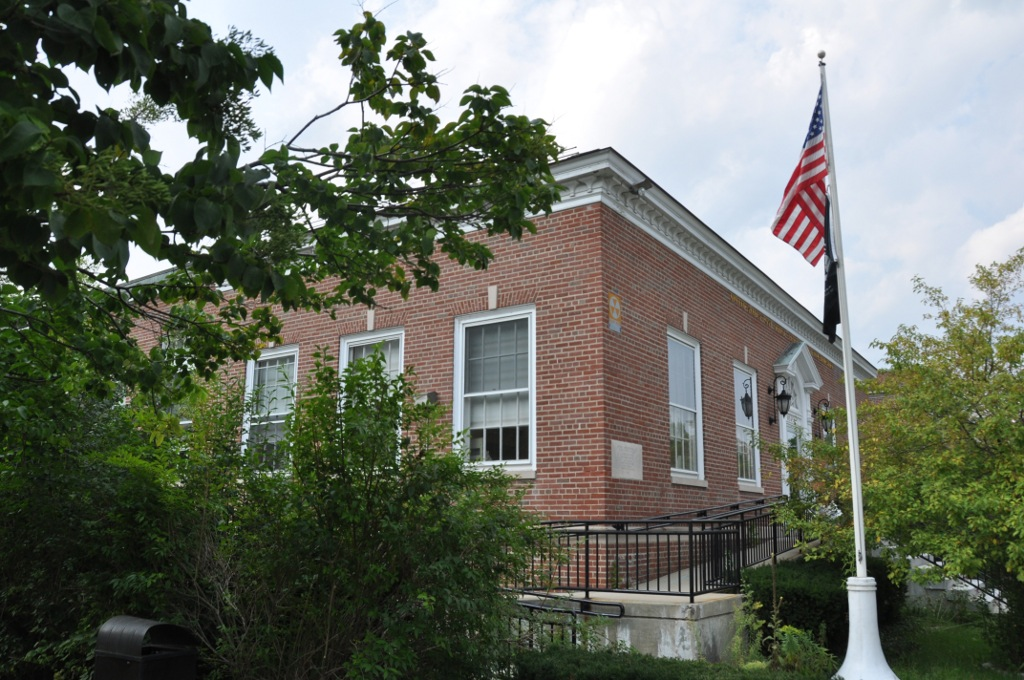

- Location within New Hampshire Location within the United States
- Location: 23 Grove St., Peterborough, New Hampshire
- Coordinates: 42°52′1″N 71°57′40″W
- Area: 0.4 acres (0.16 ha)
- Built: 1936
- Architect: Louis A. Simon; Loucke & Clark
- Architectural style: Colonial Revival, Georgian Revival
- NRHP reference No.: 86002253
- Added to NRHP: July 17, 1986

The Peterborough Main Post Office is located at 23 Grove Street in Peterborough, New Hampshire. Built in 1936, it is a well-preserved example of Georgian Revival architecture. It is further distinctive because it is virtually unaltered since its construction, and its interior features a WPA mural by Marguerite Zorach. The building was listed on the National Register of Historic Places in 1986.

== Description and history ==
The Peterborough Main Post Office is located in downtown Peterborough, on the north side of Grove Street. The single-story brick building was designed by Louis A. Simon and completed in 1936. Its exterior is finished in red brick laid in header bond, and it is covered by a slate hip roof with a carved wooden cornice. The main entrance is at the center of the street-facing facade, with a half-round fanlight window above. This assembly is framed by pilasters and a broken pediment. The entrance is flanked by sash windows set in rectangular openings that have limestone keystones. The interior has a standard plan for period post offices. The lobby floor is finished in square quarry tiles colored blue and orange, and the walls have marble wainscoting. They are plastered above the wainscoting, with a moulded plaster cornice at the ceiling. The walls are decorated by a mural depicting winter snow delivery by horse-drawn sleigh.

The post office was built in 1936 as a federal government works project during the Great Depression, and is stylistically related to surrounding buildings that were also built in the Georgian Revival style. The mural was executed by Marguerite Zorach, a local artist about whom little is known.

== See also ==
- National Register of Historic Places listings in Hillsborough County, New Hampshire
