= Dover, New Hampshire =

- City
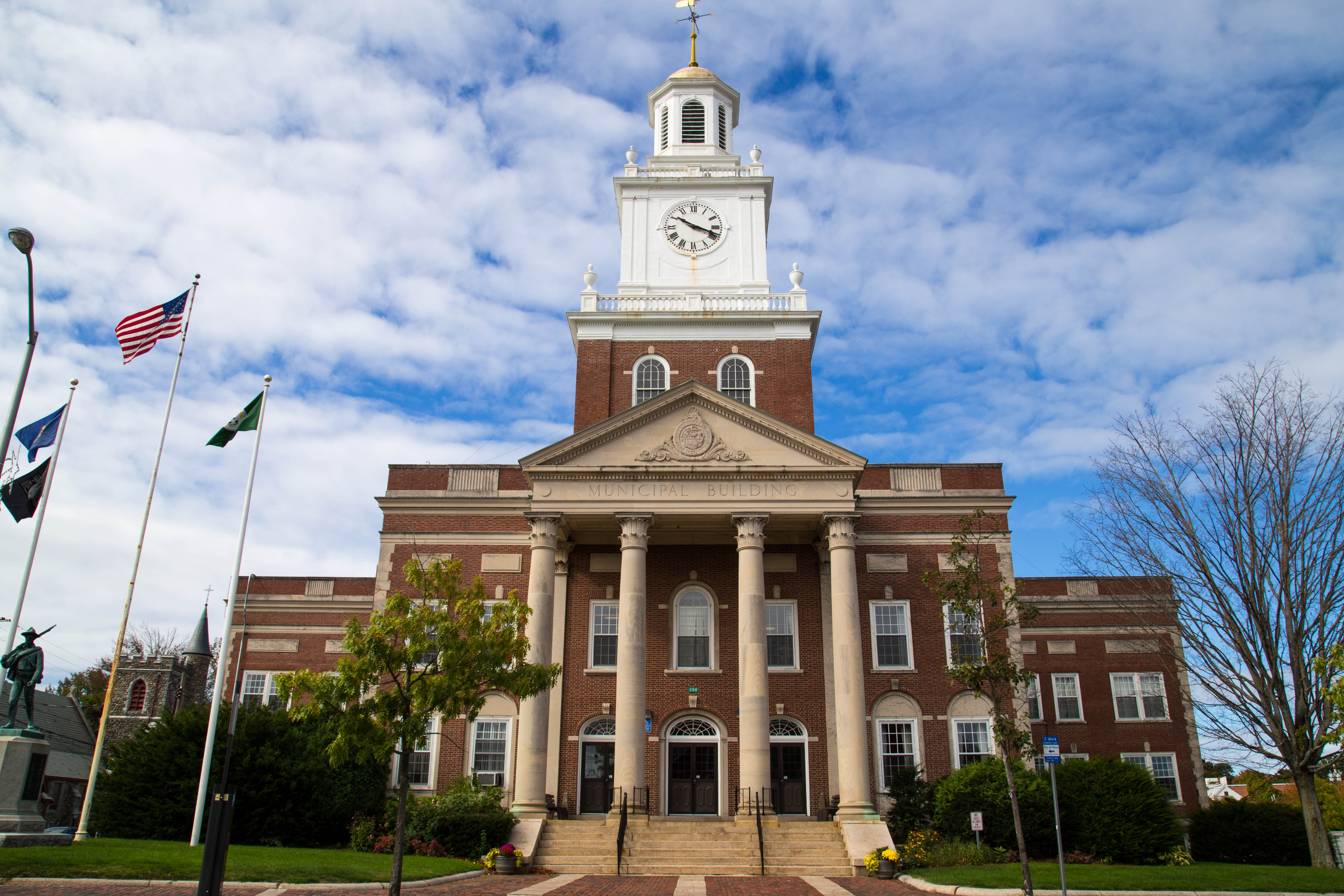
- City Hall

- Flag Seal
- Nickname: The Garrison City
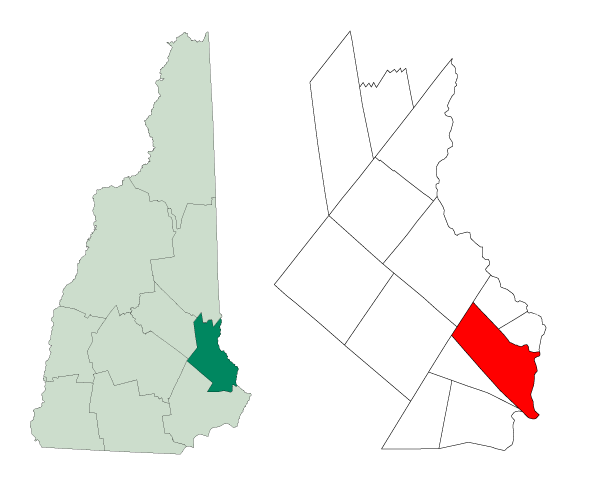
- Location within New Hampshire
- Coordinates: 43°11′20″N 70°52′25″W
- Country: United States
- State: New Hampshire
- County: Strafford
- Settled: 1623
- Incorporated: 1623 (town)
- Incorporated: 1855 (city)

Area
  - Total: 29.04 sq mi (75.22 km^{2})
  - Land: 26.73 sq mi (69.23 km^{2})
  - Water: 2.32 sq mi (6.00 km^{2}) 7.97%
- Elevation: 118 ft (36 m)

Population (2020)
  - Total: 32,741
  - Estimate (2025): 34,623
  - Density: 1,295.3/sq mi (500.1/km^{2})
- Time zone: UTC−5 (EST)
  - Summer (DST): UTC−4 (EDT)
- ZIP Codes: 03820-03822
- Area code: 603
- FIPS code: 33-18820
- GNIS feature ID: 873580
- Website: www.dover.nh.gov

Dover is a city in Strafford County, New Hampshire, United States. The population was 32,741 at the 2020 census, making it the most populous city in the New Hampshire Seacoast region and the fifth most populous city in New Hampshire.

It is the county seat of Strafford County, and home to Wentworth-Douglass Hospital, the Woodman Institute Museum, and the Children's Museum of New Hampshire.

== Etymology ==
The city is named for Dover, Kent, England. First recorded in its Latinised form of Portus Dubris, the word "Dover" derives from the Brythonic word for "waters" (dwfr in Middle Welsh). The same element is present in the word's French (Douvres) and Modern Welsh (Dofr) forms.

== History ==
=== Settlement ===
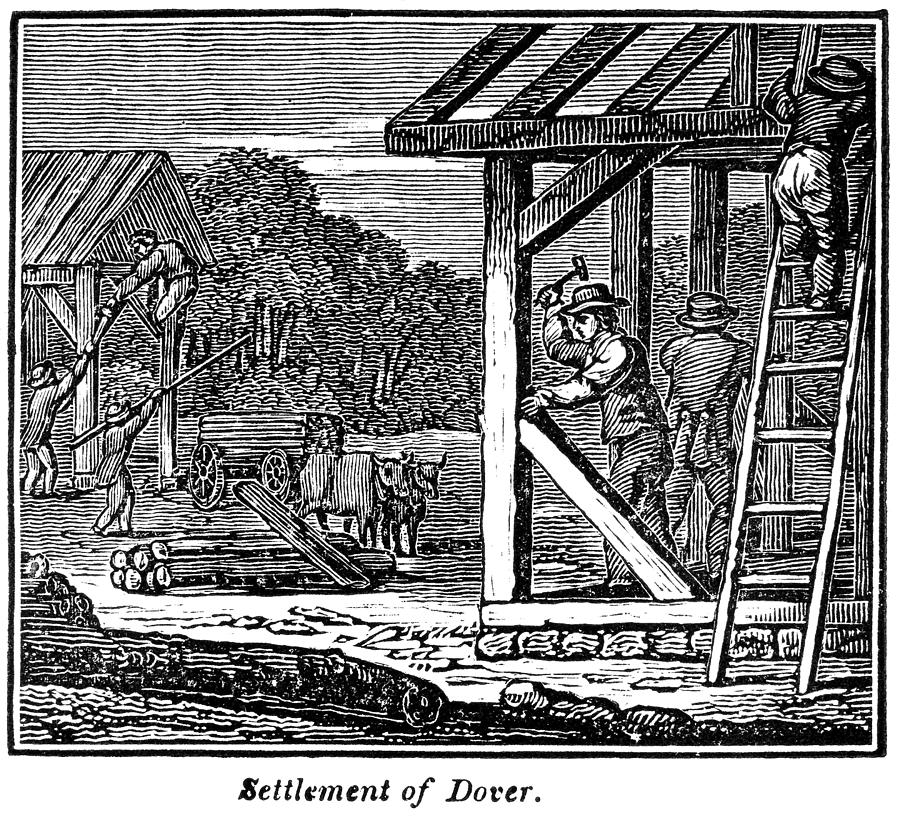
Settlement of Dover in 1623

The first known European to explore the region was Martin Pring from Bristol, England, in 1603.

In 1623, brothers William and Edward Hilton settled at Pomeroy Cove on Dover Point, near the confluence of the Bellamy and Piscataqua rivers. This first settlement makes Dover the oldest permanent settlement in New Hampshire, and seventh in the United States.

The Hiltons were fishmongers sent from London by the Council for New England's Laconia Company to establish a colony and fishery on the Piscataqua. In 1631, however, the colony contained only three houses. William Hilton built a salt works on the property (salt-making was the principal industry in his hometown of Northwich, England). He also served as Deputy to the General Court (the colonial legislature). The Hiltons' name survives at Hilton Park on Dover Point (originally known as Hilton Point).

The colony's original townships included Durham, Madbury, Newington, Lee, Somersworth and Rollinsford.

In 1633, the plantation was bought by a group of English Puritans who planned to settle in New England, including Viscount Saye and Sele, Baron Brooke and John Pym. They promoted colonization in America, and so that year Hilton's Point received numerous immigrants, many from Bristol. They renamed the settlement Bristol. Atop the nearby hill, they built a meetinghouse surrounded by an entrenchment, with a jail nearby.

The town was called Dover in 1637 by the new governor, Reverend George Burdett. It was possibly named after Robert Dover, an English lawyer who resisted Puritanism. With the 1639 arrival of Thomas Larkham, however, it was renamed after Northam in Devon, where he had been preacher. But Lord Saye and Sele's group lost interest in their settlements, both here and at Saybrook, Connecticut, when their plan to establish a hereditary aristocracy in the colonies met disfavor in New England. The abandonment of the colony by its benefactors led the settlers to form their own government. All property owning males created and signed the Combination of the People of Dover to Establish a Form of Government in 1640. One of the first actions was a vote to join Massachusetts. The Puritan faction won and Dover was annexed to the Massachusetts Bay Colony and formed Norfolk County.

Because it was an early settlement in Abenaki lands, settlers built fortified log houses called garrisons, inspiring Dover's nickname "The Garrison City." The population and business center shifted from Dover Point to Cochecho Falls on the Cochecho River, where its drop of 34 feet (10 m) provided water power for industry (Cochecho means "the rapid foaming water" in the Abenaki language). The water powered sawmills for Dover's timber industry. Settlers referred to what is now downtown Dover as Cochecho Village.

=== King Philips War ===
While King Philip's War was raging in the rest of New England (1675-1676), the settlers of Dover, led by Major Richard Waldron, invited the Pennacook Indians to Dover to sign a non-aggression pact. In June 1676, Chief Wannalancet led the Pennacook to Dover to begin negotiations. After a month of negotiations, Chief Wannalancet and Major Waldron signed the Treaty of Cocheco on July 3, 1676.

Likely due to the peaceful relations, the Dover area attracted Native American refugees who were affiliated with King Philip and his uprising.

=== Cochecho Massacre ===
On June 28, 1689, Dover suffered a devastating attack by Native Americans. It was revenge for an incident on September 7, 1676, when 400 Native Americans were tricked by Major Richard Waldron into performing a "mock battle" near Cochecho Falls. After discharging their weapons, the Native American warriors were captured. Half were sent to Massachusetts for predations committed during King Philip's War, and seven or eight were hanged, and others were sold into slavery. Local Native Americans deemed innocent were released, but considered the deception a dishonorable breach of hospitality. Thirteen years passed. When colonists thought the episode forgotten, they struck. Fifty-two colonists, a quarter of the population, were either captured or slain. This was the first attack of the Mournful Decade or King William's War.

Incursions against the frontier town would continue for the next half-century. During Father Rale's War, in August and September 1723, there were Indian raids on Saco, Maine, and Dover, New Hampshire. The following year Dover was raided again and Elizabeth Hanson wrote her captivity narrative.

=== Mill era ===
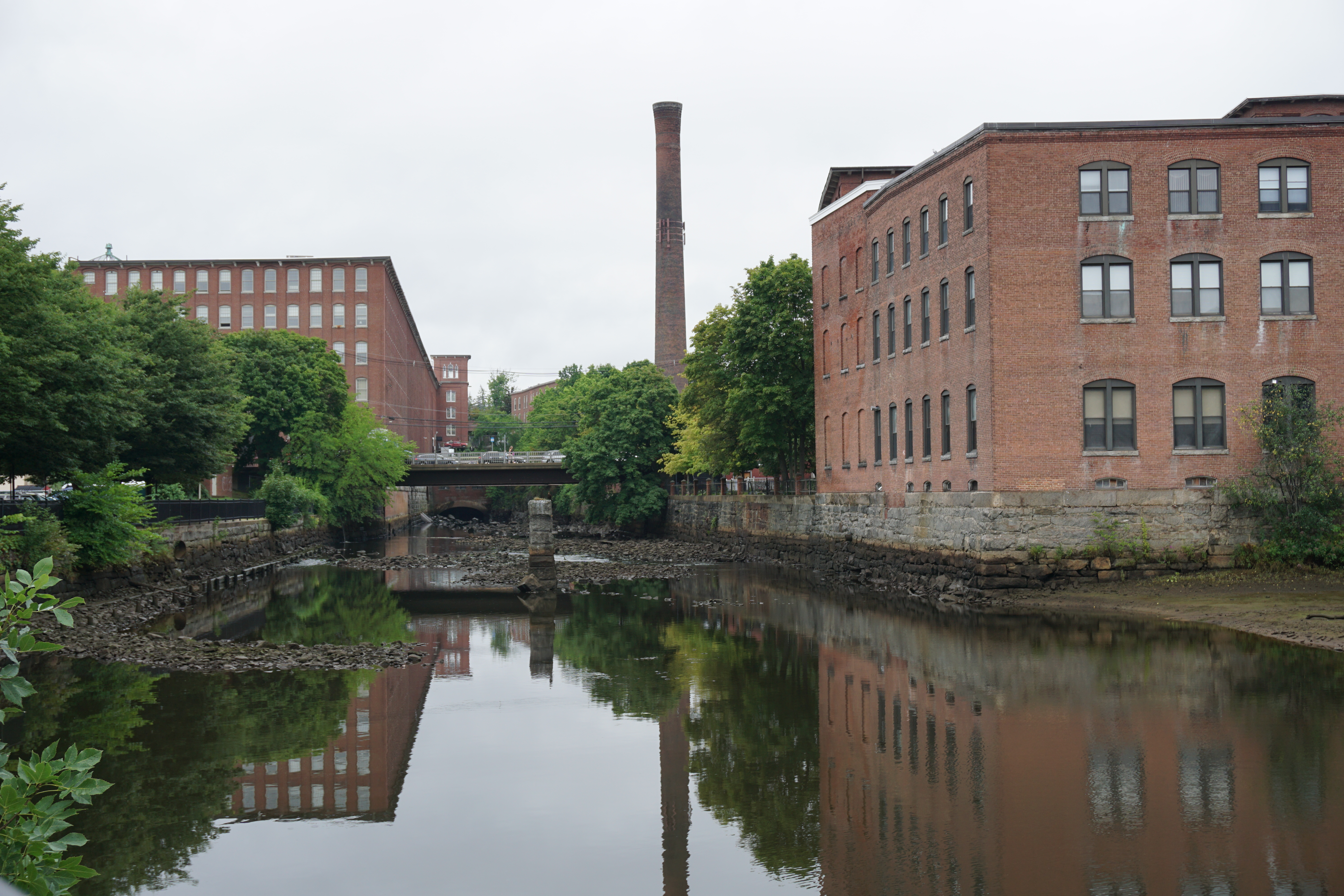
Cochecho River with repurposed mill buildings, from Henry Law Park

Located at the head of navigation, Cochecho Falls brought the Industrial Revolution to 19th-century Dover in a big way. But cotton textile manufacturing actually began about two miles upstream with the Dover Cotton Factory, which was incorporated in 1812, its mill built in 1815. The business would move to Cochecho Falls when it acquired water privileges occupied since the 17th century by sawmills and gristmills. In 1823, it was renamed the Dover Manufacturing Company, but was not successful. So in 1827 the Cocheco Manufacturing Company was founded (the misspelling a clerical error at incorporation), and the next year, the mill was the site of the first women's strike in the United States. "The Strike of the Mill Girls" took place on December 30, 1828, when about half of the 800 women employed at the mill walked out over lower wages and longer hours that the new owners had implemented. Expansive brick mills were constructed downtown, linked to receive cotton bales and ship finished cloth when the railroad arrived in 1842. Incorporated as a city in 1855, Dover for a time became a leading national producer of textiles, the mill complex dominating the riverfront and employing 2,000 workers.

The mills were purchased in 1909 by the Pacific Mills of Lawrence, Massachusetts, which closed the printery in 1913 but continued spinning and weaving. The printery buildings were demolished in 1913; their site is now Henry Law Park.

In 1922, it was affected by the 1922 New England Textile Strike, shutting down the mills in the city over an attempted wage cut and hours increase.

During the Great Depression, however, textile mills no longer dependent on New England water power began moving to southern states in search of cheaper operating conditions, or simply went out of business. Dover's millyard shut in 1937, then was bought at auction in 1941 by the city itself for $54,000. There were no other bids. Now called the Cocheco Falls Millworks, its tenants include technology and government services companies, plus a restaurant, brewery and bar.

Textile manufacturing in Dover wasn't limited to cotton. In 1824, Alfred I. Sawyer established the Sawyer Woolen Mills beside the Bellamy River. It would expand to include 15 major buildings over 8.5 acres (3.4 ha), and by 1883 was the largest woolen manufacturer in the state. In 1889, it was acquired by the American Woolen Company, but closed and was sold off in 1955. The buildings have been repurposed into housing.

=== Modern era ===
With the closing of the mills, the downtown area of Dover sat vacant and lifeless for a long time. With the turn of the century, the city government began to revitalize the area. The Children's Museum of New Hampshire was brought into a disused mill building with a lease of $1 a year. Henry Law Park, a grassy waterfront stretch of land, was given a brand new playground. Small businesses moved into the mills, such as restaurants, toy stores, real estate offices, and barber shops. Old buildings have been refurbished or outright rebuilt to provide new housing. An $87.5 million high school was built to handle the influx of new residents retreating from the high housing prices in Portsmouth. Recently, a plan to develop the waterfront on the other side of the river from the traditional downtown area was approved for $6 million. In early May 2021, waypoint signs were sporadically added to help drivers and walkers navigate Dover with the expansions that are underway.

=== Antique postcards ===
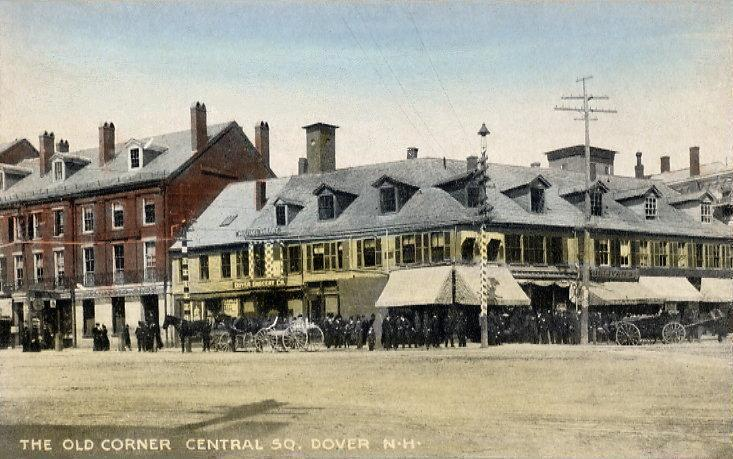
The Old Corner c. 1892

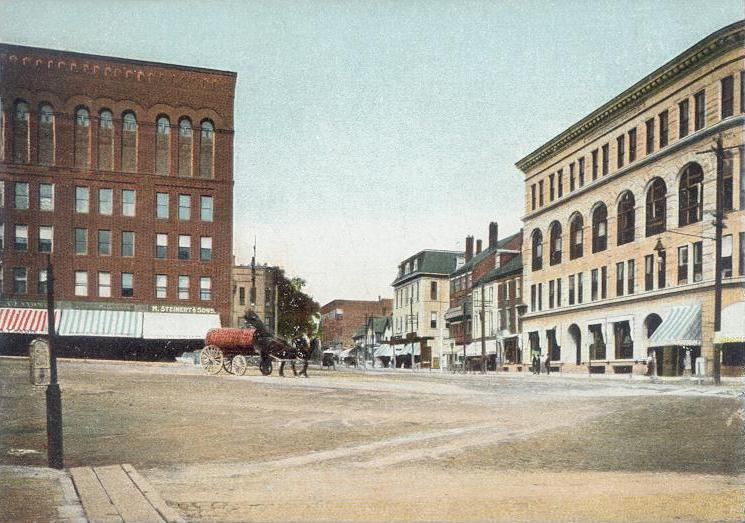
Central Square c. 1905

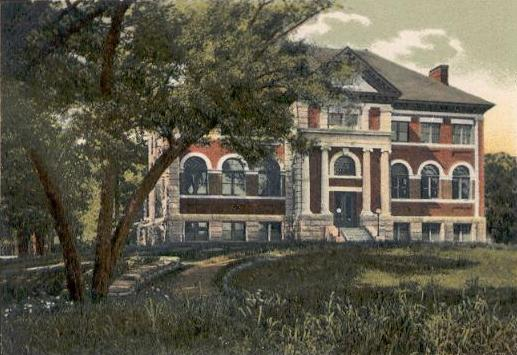
Public Library c. 1907

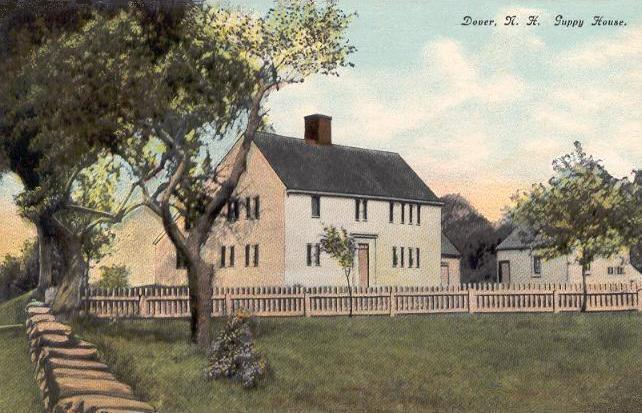
Guppy House c. 1910

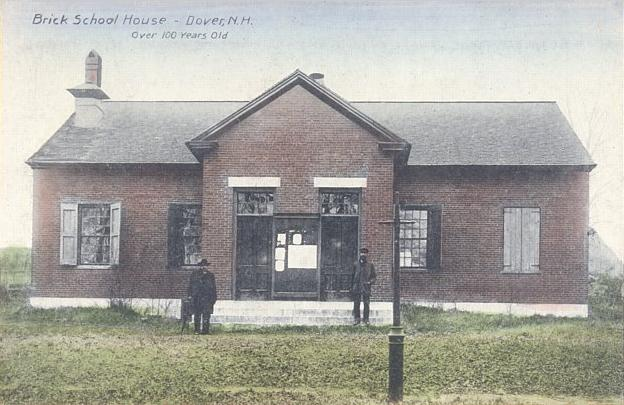
Old Brick Schoolhouse c. 1910, once located near Pine Hill Cemetery

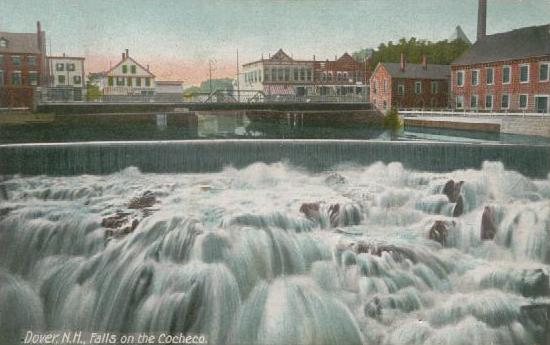
Cochecho Falls c. 1910

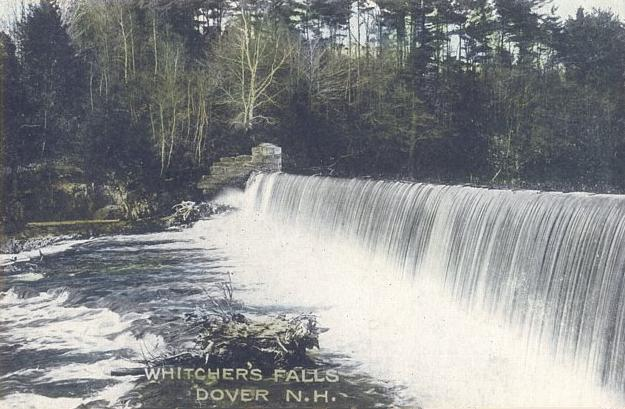
Whitcher's Falls c. 1910

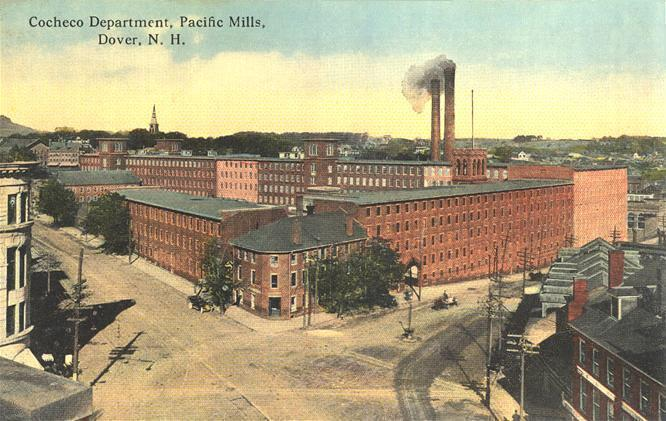
Pacific Mills c. 1912

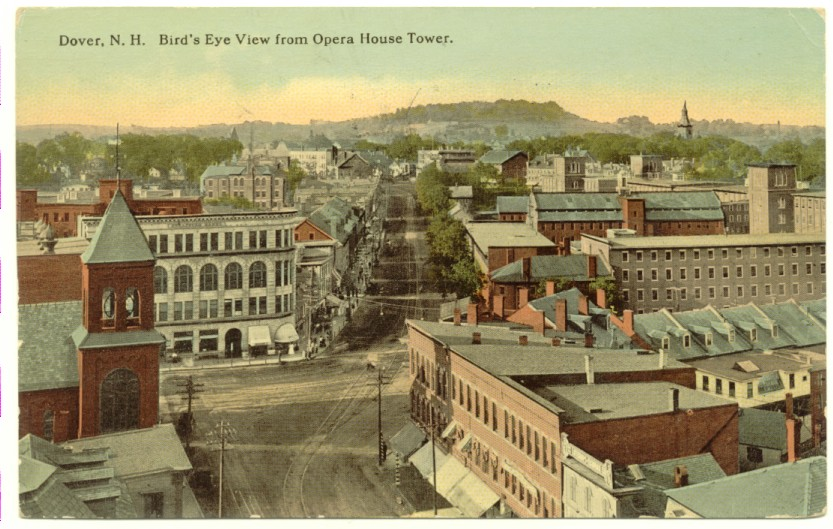
Downtown c. 1913

== Geography and transportation ==
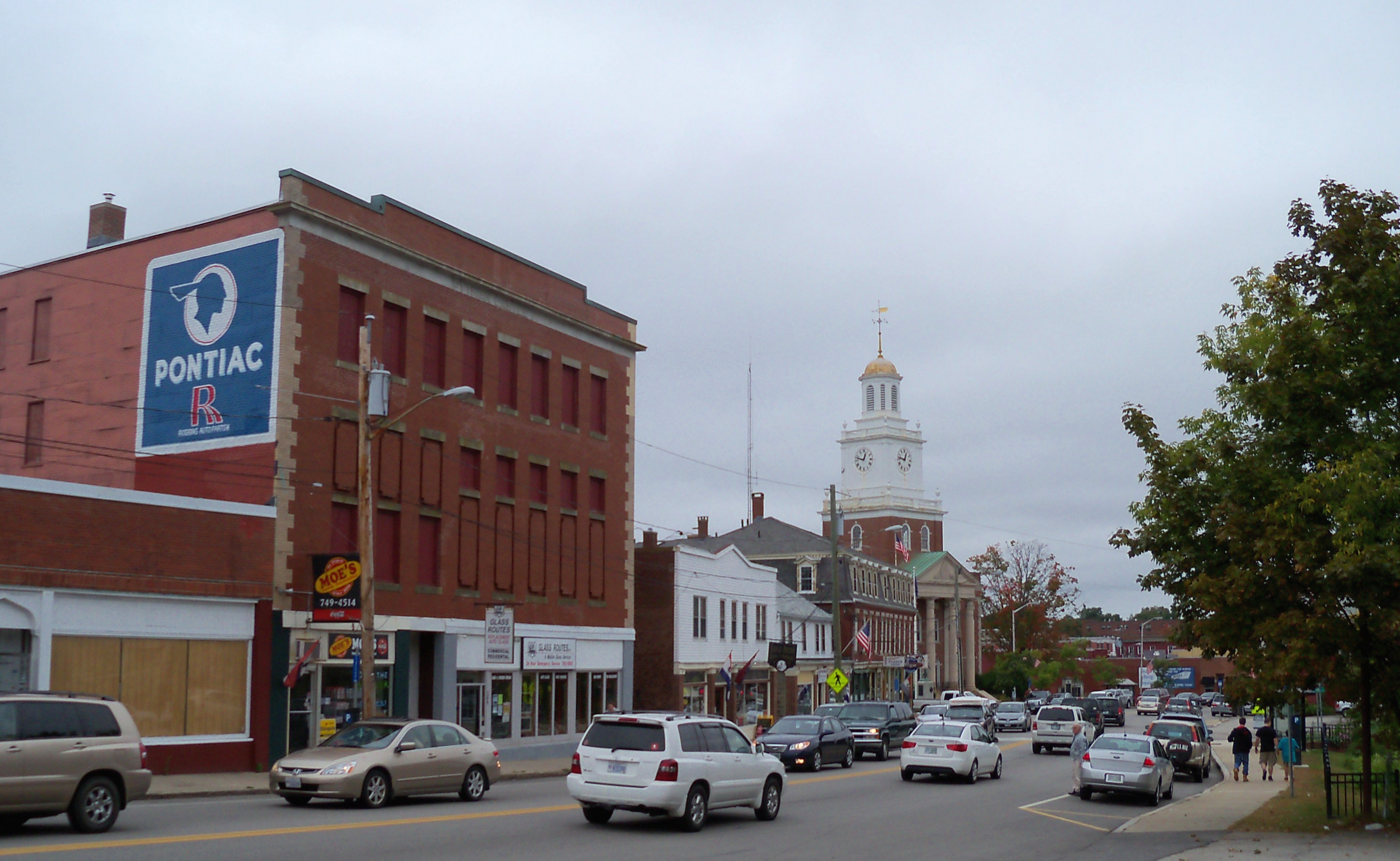
Downtown Dover

According to the United States Census Bureau, the city has a total area of 29.0 square miles (75.2 km^{2}), of which 26.7 square miles (69.2 km^{2}) are land and 2.3 square miles (6.0 km^{2}) are water, comprising 7.97% of the city. Dover is drained by the Cochecho and Bellamy rivers, both of which flow into the tidal Piscataqua River, which forms the city's eastern boundary and the New Hampshire–Maine border. Long Hill, elevation greater than 300 feet (91 m) above sea level and located 3 miles (5 km) northwest of the city center, is the highest point in Dover. Garrison Hill, elevation approximately 290 ft (88 m), is a prominent hill rising directly above the center city, with a park and lookout tower on top. The average elevation above sea level in Dover is 49 feet (15 m).

The city is crossed by New Hampshire Routes 4, 9, 16 (the Spaulding Turnpike), 108, and 155, plus U.S. Route 4. It is bordered by the town of Newington to the south (across the inlet to Great Bay), Durham to the south across from where the Bellamy River meets the inlet to Great Bay, Madbury to the southwest, Barrington and Rochester to the northwest, and Somersworth and Rollinsford to the northeast. South Berwick, Maine, lies to the northeast, across the tidal Salmon Falls River, and Eliot, Maine, is to the east, across the Piscataqua River.

The Cooperative Alliance for Seacoast Transportation operates a publicly funded bus network in Dover and surrounding communities in New Hampshire and Maine. C&J Bus Lines is a private intercity bus carrier currently connecting Dover with Boston's South Station and Logan Airport, as well as New York City's Port Authority Bus Terminal. Wildcat Transit, operated by the University of New Hampshire, provides bus service to Durham, which is free for students and $1.50 for the public. Amtrak's Downeaster train service stops at the Dover Transportation Center with service to the Portland Transportation Center, Boston's North Station, and intermediate stops.

== Demographics ==
Historical population
Census	Pop.	Note	%±
1790	1,998		—
1800	2,062		3.2%
1810	2,228		8.1%
1820	2,871		28.9%
1830	5,449		89.8%
1840	6,458		18.5%
1850	8,196		26.9%
1860	8,502		3.7%
1870	9,294		9.3%
1880	11,687		25.7%
1890	12,790		9.4%
1900	13,207		3.3%
1910	13,247		0.3%
1920	13,029		−1.6%
1930	13,573		4.2%
1940	13,990		3.1%
1950	15,874		13.5%
1960	19,131		20.5%
1970	20,850		9.0%
1980	22,377		7.3%
1990	25,042		11.9%
2000	26,884		7.4%
2010	29,987		11.5%
2020	32,741		9.2%
2025 (est.)	34,623		5.7%
U.S. Decennial Census

=== 2020 census ===
As of the 2020 census, Dover had a population of 32,741. The city grew by 2,754 residents between 2010 and 2020, the third-largest numeric growth of a town or city in New Hampshire, after Manchester and Nashua. The population density in 2020 was 1,224.88 people per square mile (472.93/km^{2}).

The median age was 38.0 years. 18.1% of residents were under the age of 18 and 16.8% of residents were 65 years of age or older. For every 100 females there were 96.9 males, and for every 100 females age 18 and over there were 95.1 males age 18 and over.

86.4% of residents lived in urban areas, while 13.6% lived in rural areas.

There were 14,431 households, of which 7,059 were families; 24.2% had children under the age of 18 living in them. Of all households, 39.7% were married-couple households, 21.5% were households with a male householder and no spouse or partner present, and 28.6% were households with a female householder and no spouse or partner present. About 34.2% of all households were made up of individuals and 11.6% had someone living alone who was 65 years of age or older.

There were 15,166 housing units at an average density of 567.38 per square mile (219.07/km^{2}), of which 4.8% were vacant. The homeowner vacancy rate was 0.9% and the rental vacancy rate was 4.8%.

Racial composition as of the 2020 census
Race	Number	Percent
White	28,073	85.7%
Black or African American	551	1.7%
American Indian and Alaska Native	65	0.2%
Asian	1,803	5.5%
Native Hawaiian and Other Pacific Islander	5	0.0%
Some other race	401	1.2%
Two or more races	1,843	5.6%
Hispanic or Latino (of any race)	1,047	3.2%

=== 2010 census ===
There were 12,827 households, out of which 27.8% had children under the age of 18 living with them, 40.8% were headed by married couples living together, 10.3% had a female householder with no husband present, and 45.0% were non-families. 31.8% of all households were made up of individuals, and 9.6% were someone living alone who was 65 years of age or older. The average household size was 2.27, and the average family size was 2.89.

In the city, the population was spread out, with 20.3% under the age of 18, 11.0% from 18 to 24, 30.6% from 25 to 44, 24.9% from 45 to 64, and 13.1% who were 65 years of age or older. The median age was 36.7 years. For every 100 females, there were 96.0 males. For every 100 females age 18 and over, there were 94.0 males.

=== Income and poverty ===
For the period 2009–2011, the estimated median annual income for a household in the city was $55,040, and the median income for a family was $69,980. Male full-time workers had a median income of $51,891 versus $36,167 for females. The per capita income for the city was $30,590. About 6.8% of families and 8.9% of the population were below the poverty line, including 13.2% of those under age 18 and 5.9% of those age 65 or over.

== Education ==
The Dover School District serves approximately 4,000 pupils, attending Horne Street Elementary School, Garrison Elementary School, Woodman Park Elementary School, Dover Middle School and Dover High School. Dover High's athletic teams are known as "The Green Wave," and the middle school's teams are "The Little Green."

Saint Mary Academy, a Catholic school, has been in downtown Dover since 1912, currently serving about 200 students from pre-kindergarten to 8th grade. Many students at Saint Mary's subsequently attend St. Thomas Aquinas High School, a Catholic high school located on Dover Point.

Portsmouth Christian Academy is located west of the Bellamy River in Dover, serving preschool through 12th grade.

The Cocheco Arts and Technology Academy (CATA) is a public charter high school with about 100 students. It was formerly located in Barrington, New Hampshire.

The Seacoast Charter School is a publicly funded elementary/middle school that integrates the arts into the core curriculum. The school was founded in 2004 in Kingston, New Hampshire, and relocated to Dover in 2015. Enrollment in January 2016 was 215 students in grades K–8.

== Government ==
Dover city vote by party in presidential elections
Year	Democratic	Republican	Third parties
2024	63.99% 12,655	33.63% 6,650	1.07% 211
2020	65.19% 12,508	32.99% 6,331	1.80% 346
2016	58.17% 10,118	34.58% 6,015	7.25% 1,262
2012	59.85% 9,724	37.93% 6,162	2.22% 360
2008	63.17% 10,221	35.51% 5,746	1.32% 214
2004	59.39% 9,225	39.95% 6,206	0.66% 103
2000	54.32% 6,812	39.94% 5,008	5.74% 720
1996	56.38% 6,332	33.41% 3,752	10.21% 1,147
1992	45.45% 5,449	35.01% 4,197	19.54% 2,342
1988	46.59% 4,803	51.97% 5,357	1.44% 148
1984	41.32% 3,826	58.29% 5,397	0.39% 36
1980	35.14% 3,344	47.26% 4,497	17.60% 1,675
1976	49.53% 4,386	47.48% 4,204	2.99% 265
1972	42.94% 3,697	56.39% 4,855	0.66% 57
1968	51.12% 4,101	47.08% 3,777	1.81% 145
1964	68.53% 5,629	31.47% 2,585	0.00% 0
1960	52.34% 4,697	47.66% 4,277	0.00% 0

In the New Hampshire Senate, Dover is in the 4th District and is currently represented by Democrat David H. Watters. On the New Hampshire Executive Council, Dover is in District 2 and is currently represented by Democrat Cinde Warmington. In the U.S. House of Representatives, Dover is included in New Hampshire's 1st congressional district and is currently represented by Democrat Chris Pappas.

Dover is a Democratic stronghold in presidential elections. No Republican presidential nominee has carried Dover since George H. W. Bush's five-point victory in the town over Michael Dukakis in 1988.

== Historic sites ==
- First Parish Church
- New Hampshire Historical Marker No. 51: Dr. Jeremy Belknap (1744–1798)
- New Hampshire Historical Marker No. 92: Hilton's Point – 1623
- New Hampshire Historical Marker No. 165: The Alexander Scammell Bridge over the Bellamy River
- New Hampshire Historical Marker No. 264: Home of John Parker Hale, 1840–1873
- New Hampshire Historical Marker No. 282: Native Retribution Against Maj. Waldron
- New Hampshire Historical Marker No. 289: Creation of the Teenage Mutant Ninja Turtles
- Religious Society of Friends Meetinghouse
- St. Thomas Episcopal Church
- Woodman Institute

== See also ==
- Dover Transportation Center
- McIntosh College
- 1987 Little League World Series, when a team from Dover advanced to the quarter-finals
