= Koehler & Isaak =

American architectural firm

Practice information
- Founders: Richard Koehler; Nicholas Isaak
- Founded: 1946
- Dissolved: 1985
- Location: Manchester, New Hampshire

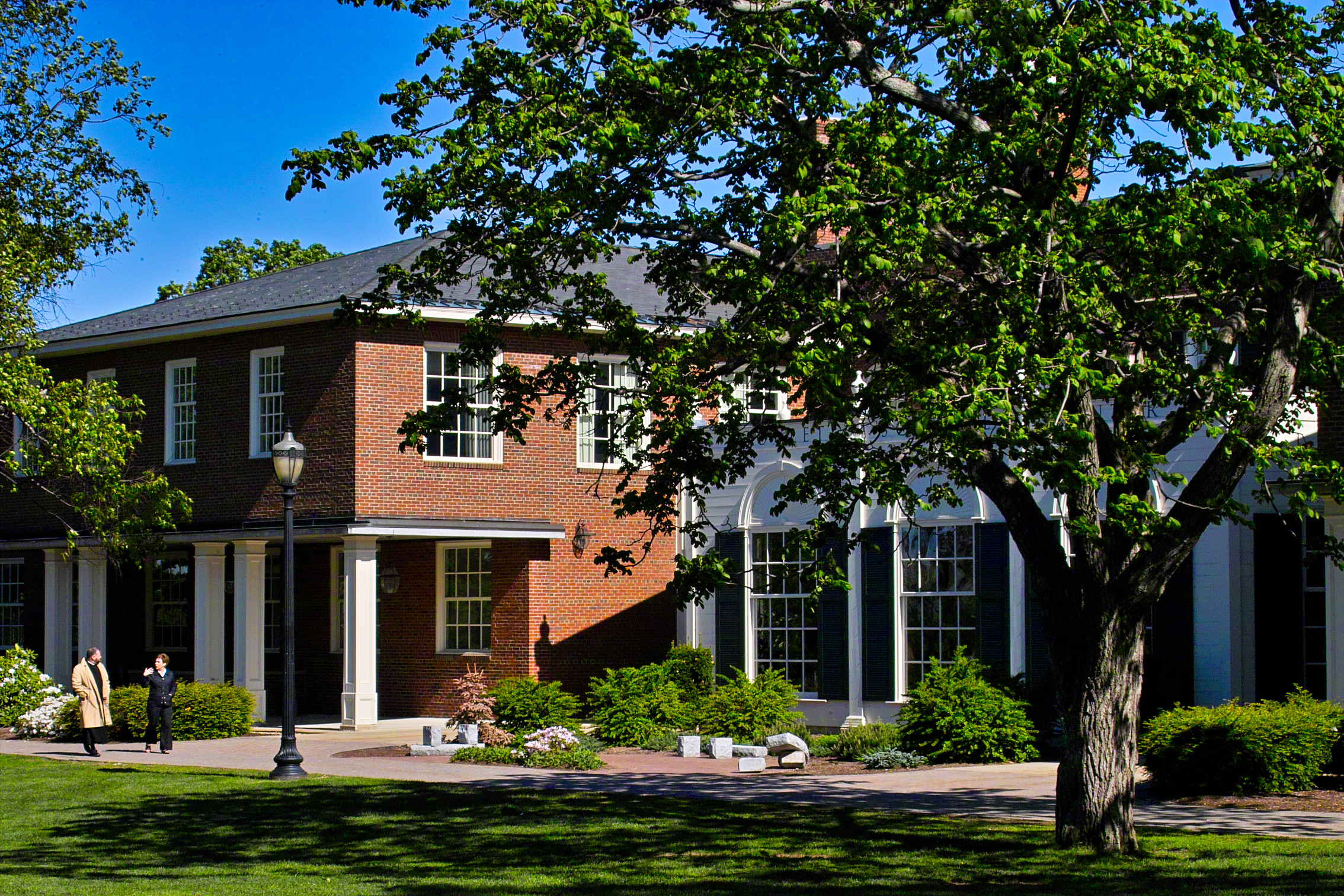
The Goulet Science Center of Saint Anselm College in Goffstown, completed in 1960.

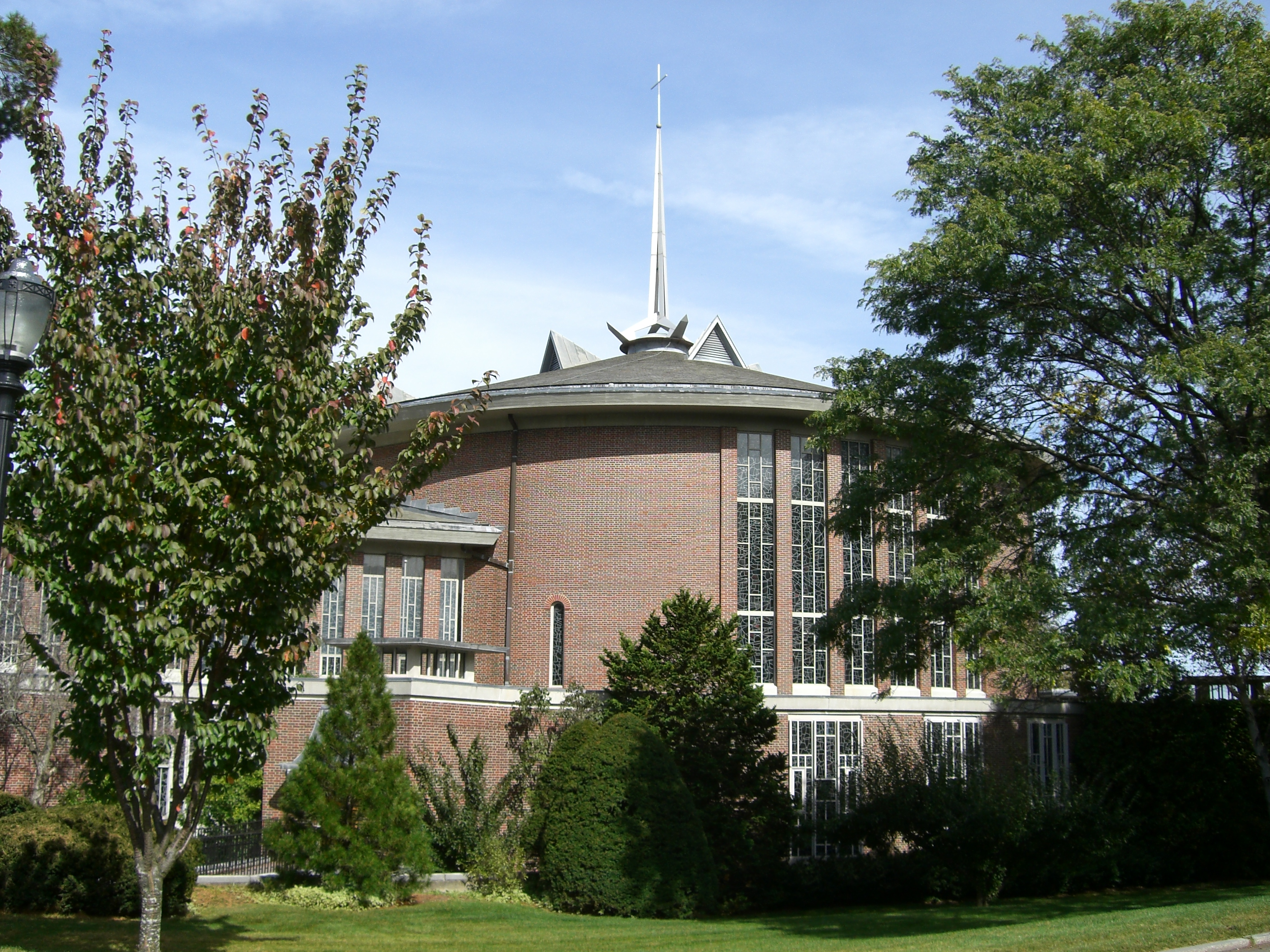
The Abbey Church of Saint Anselm College in Goffstown, completed in 1965.

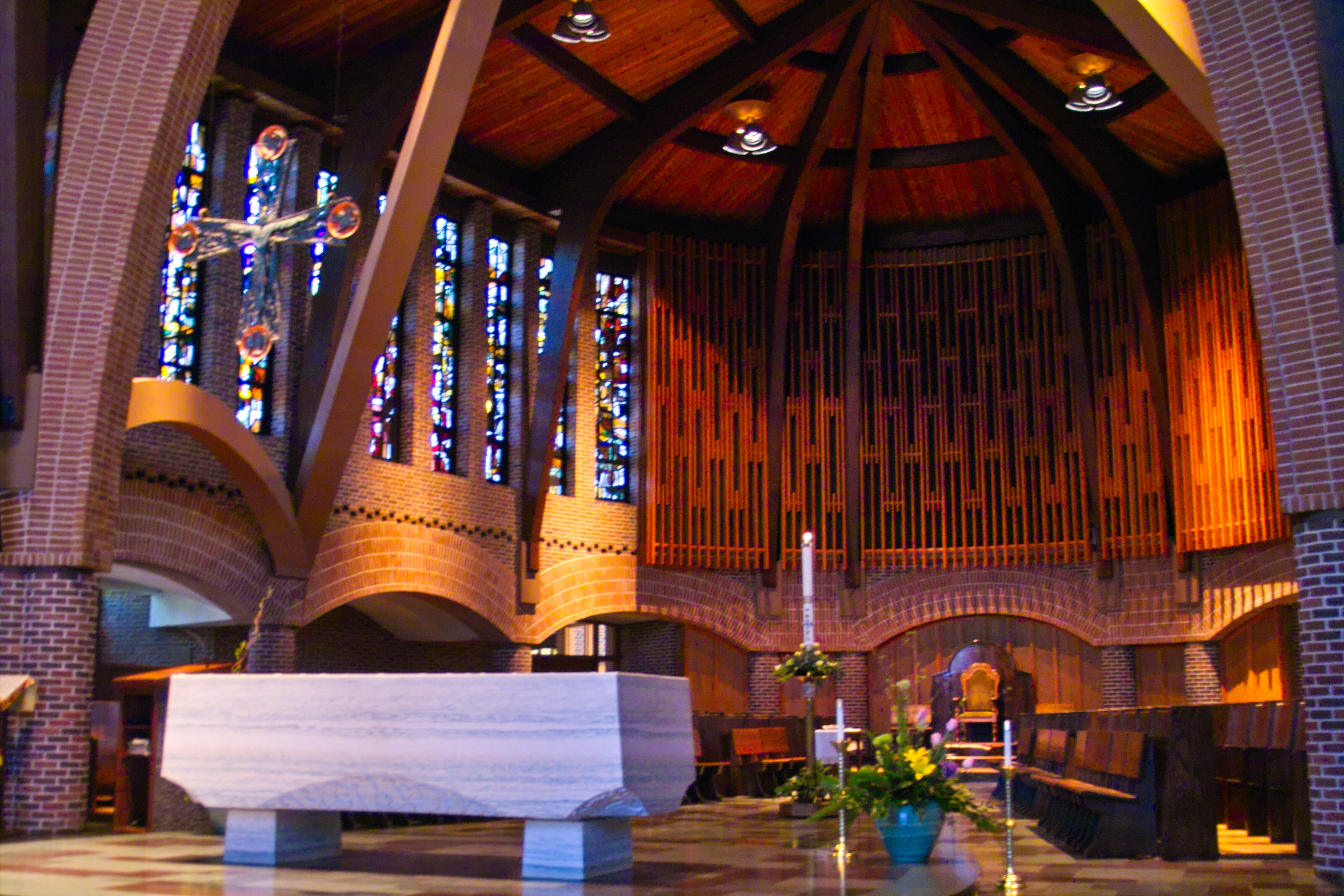
Interior view of the Abbey Church.

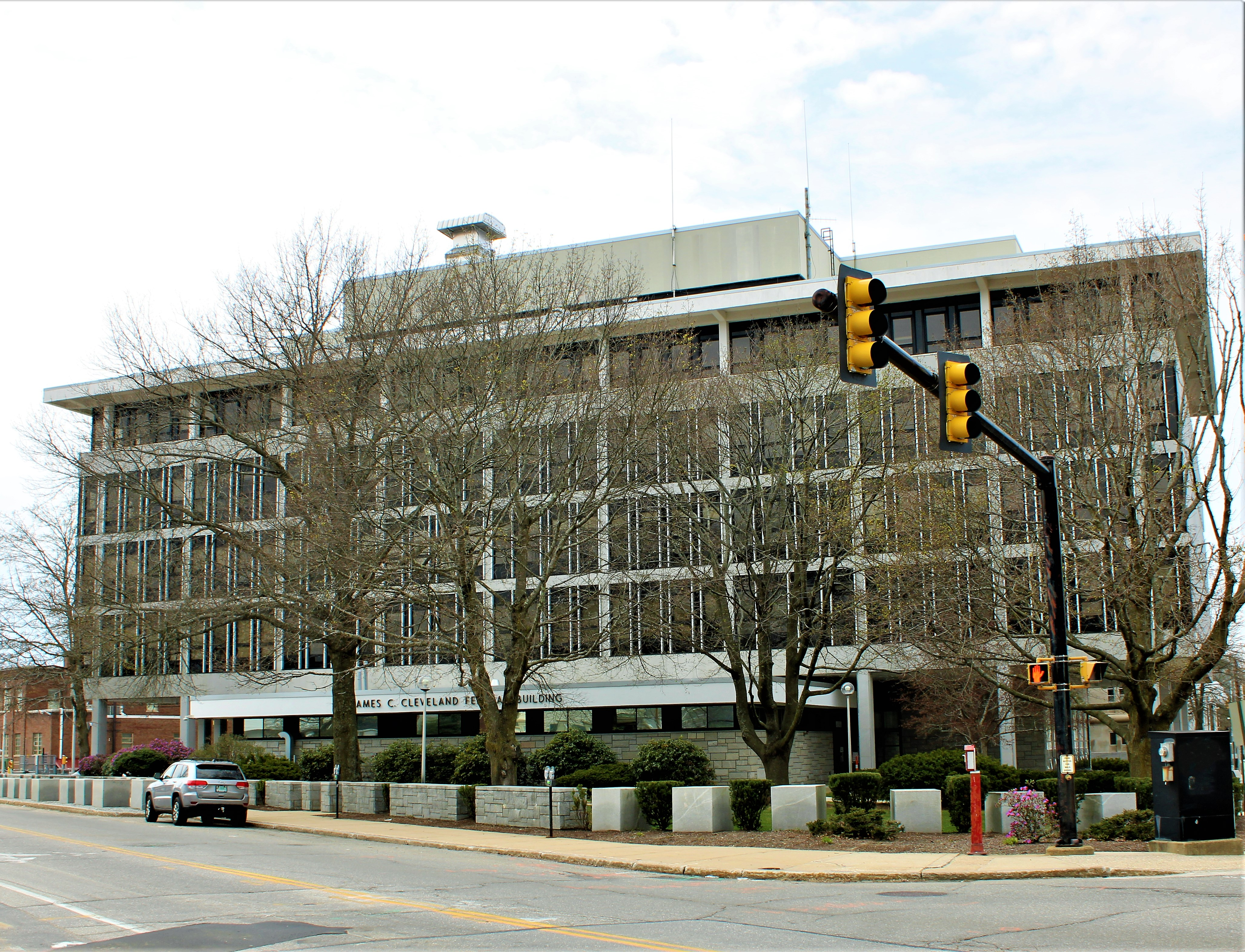
The James C. Cleveland Federal Building in Concord, completed in 1966.

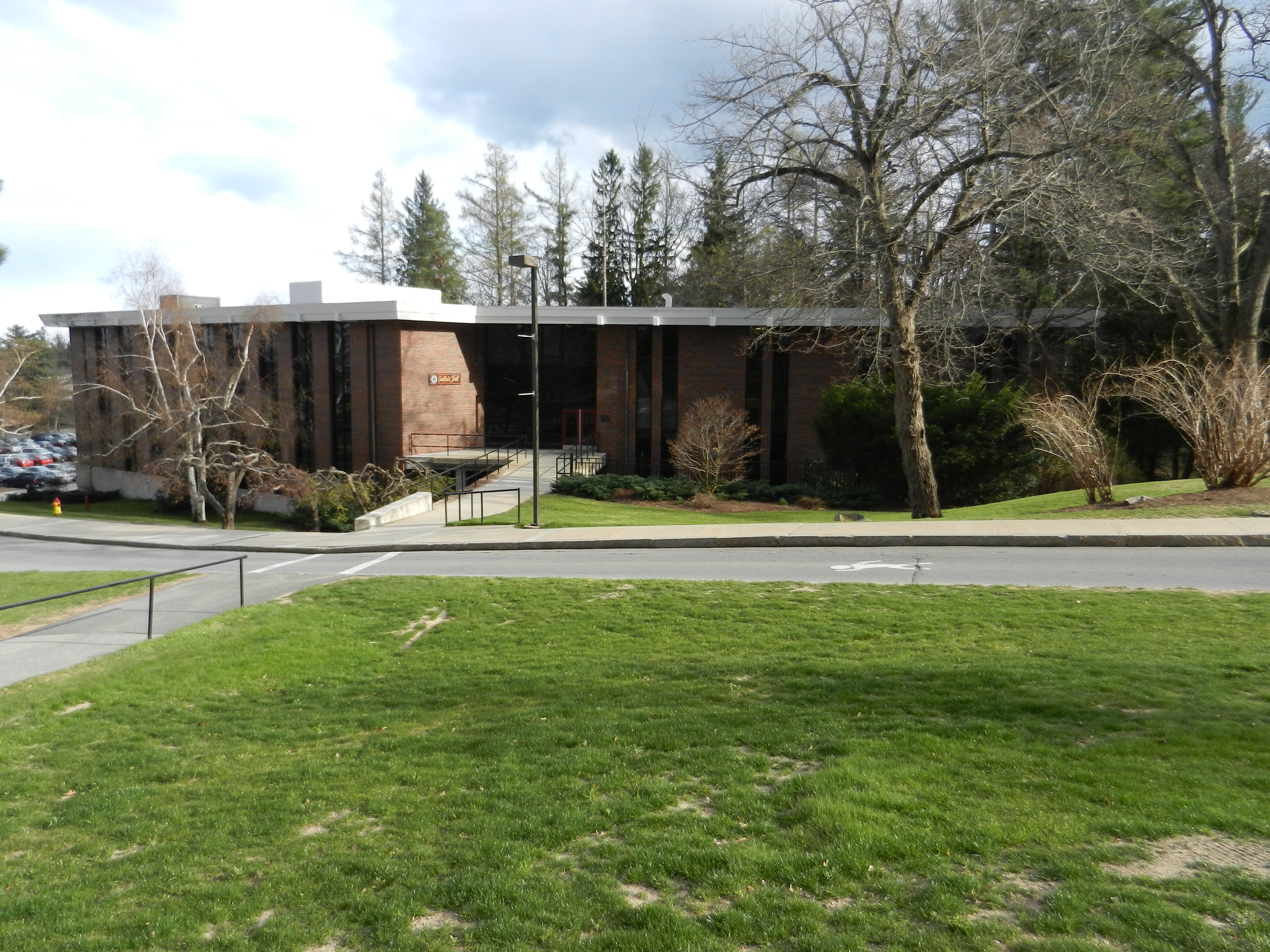
Gadbois Hall of Saint Anselm College in Goffstown, completed in 1969.

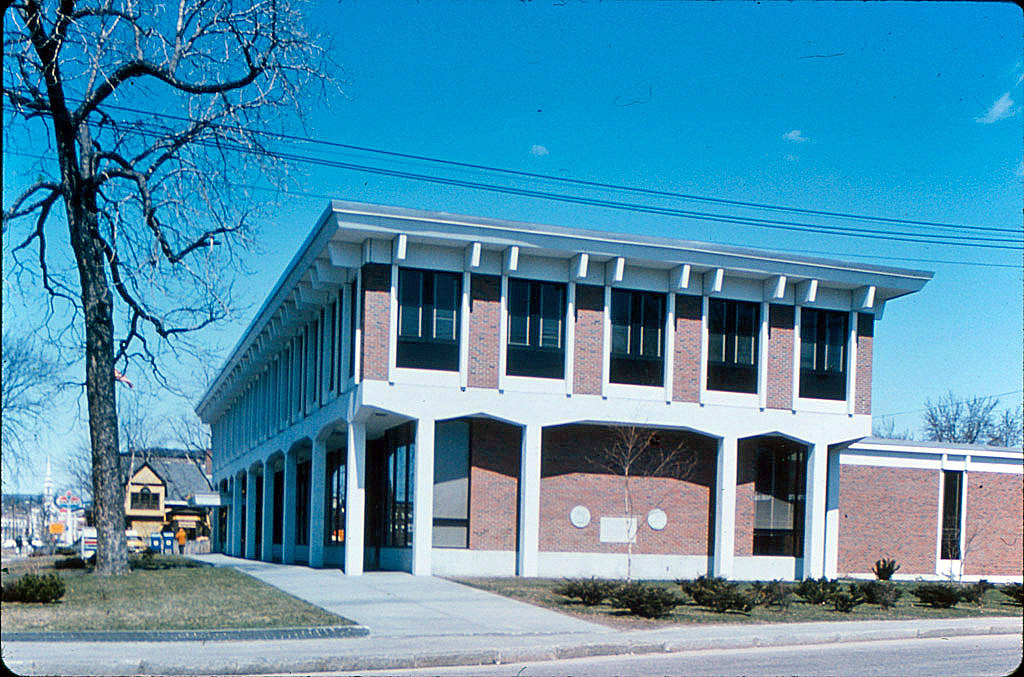
The United States Post Office in Keene, completed in 1971.

Koehler & Isaak was an architectural firm active in Manchester, New Hampshire, from 1946 to 1970 and under other names until 1985. The firm had the largest architectural practice in New Hampshire at its height during the 1960s. The named partners were Richard Koehler AIA (1912–1974) and Nicholas Isaak AIA (1913–1975).

== Biography and history ==
Richard Koehler, born September 28, 1912, in Riverside, Rhode Island, and Nicholas Isaak, born September 22, 1913, in Dardhë, Albania, were both educated in their local public schools and at the University of New Hampshire. Koehler, graduated in 1934, and Isaak, graduated in 1936, both studied under Eric T. Huddleston. After working for Manchester architect Wilfred E. Provost, Koehler opened his own Manchester office in 1936. Meanwhile, Isaak worked for Huddleston in Durham and for Lockwood Greene Engineers in Boston. During World War II both served in the navy.

In 1946, after the war had ended, both Koehler and Isaak returned to New Hampshire, forming the firm of Koehler & Isaak. During the 1950s and 1960s this was the largest and most successful architecture firm in the state. Architects Alexander John Majeski and Andrew C. Isaak worked for Koehler & Isaak before opening their own offices in 1954 and 1956. Gerald F. Oudens, later a successful Washington, D.C., architect, also worked for the firm in the 1950s. Koehler retired from practice in 1970, and died in 1974. After Koehler's retirement Isaak reorganized the firm as Isaak, Moyer, Walsh & Dudley with several associates of the former firm. In 1973 Isaak's partners left to organize Dudley, Walsh & Moyer (Note: Major works of Dudley, Walsh & Moyer after leaving Isaak include distinctive additions to the New Hampshire Legislative Office Building in Concord and to the Belknap County Courthouse in Laconia.) and Isaak merged his practice with his brother's firm, Andrew C. Isaak Associates. He died two years later in 1975. Andrew C. Isaak ran the firm until his own death in 1985, after which it was dissolved.

Major works completed by Koehler & Isaak include federal office buildings in Concord, Keene, Manchester and Portsmouth, several state office buildings in Concord and much of the campus of Saint Anselm College. In 1958 they completed the New Hampshire Department of Employment Security offices in Concord, a building that was much maligned in later years but at the time was seen as a great indicator of architectural progress in New Hampshire. In 2012 the sale of this building spurred the department to contract with preservation consultant Lisa Mausolf to prepare a report on mid-century modern architecture in the state. Among her recommendations was the writing of a monagraph on the work of Koehler & Isaak as the most prominent local architectural firm of the study period.

Richard Koehler, Nicholas Isaak and Andrew C. Isaak were all members of the American Institute of Architects. All three served as New Hampshire chapter presidents: Koehler for 1953–54 and 1954–55, Nicholas Isaak for 1958–59 and Andrew C. Isaak for 1961–62.

== Architectural works ==
- Recreation building, John H. Sununu Youth Services Center, 1056 River Rd, Manchester, New Hampshire (1948)
- Kelley Falls, (Note: Designed in collaboration with John D. Betley, Carl E. Peterson and Provost & Wright of Manchester.) 315 Kimball St, Manchester, New Hampshire (1950)
- Elmwood Gardens, (Note: Designed in collaboration with Betley and Dirsa & Lampron of Manchester.) 83 Trahan St, Manchester, New Hampshire (1952)
- Davison Building, 1230 Elm St, Manchester, New Hampshire (1954, altered)
- Pease Air National Guard Base, (Note: Designed in collaboration with Hersey & Spaulding of Durham, Alfred T. Granger Associates of Hanover, Tracy & Hildreth of Nashua and Maurice E. Witmer of Portsmouth.) Portsmouth, New Hampshire (1954–56 et seq.)
- Saint Anselm Abbey, Saint Anselm College, Goffstown, New Hampshire (1955)
- Lord Hall, University of New Hampshire, Durham, New Hampshire (1956)
- New Hampshire Department of Employment Security building (former), 32 S Main St, Concord, New Hampshire (1958, demolished 2022)
- Geisel Library and Goulet Science Center, Saint Anselm College, Goffstown, New Hampshire (1959–60)
- Holy Trinity Lutheran Church, 22 Fox Run Rd, Newington, New Hampshire (1959)
- Manchester Memorial High School, (Note: Designed in collaboration with Dirsa & Lampron of Manchester.) 1 Crusader Way, Manchester, New Hampshire (1959–60)
- Morrison Hall, Keene State College, Keene, New Hampshire (1960)
- Forest Park Apartments, University of New Hampshire, Durham, New Hampshire (1961–62)
- Ammon Terminal (former), Manchester–Boston Regional Airport, Manchester, New Hampshire (1962)
- Chancery Building, Manchester, New Hampshire (1963–64)
- St. Raphael's Church, 103 Walker St, Manchester, New Hampshire (1964)
- Everett Arena, 15 Loudon Rd, Concord, New Hampshire (1965)
- Holy Cross Hall, Notre Dame College, Manchester, New Hampshire (1965)
- Saint Anselm Abbey church, Saint Anselm College, Goffstown, New Hampshire (1965–66)
- John O. Morton Building, 7 Hazen Dr, Concord, New Hampshire (1965)
- James C. Cleveland Federal Building, 53 Pleasant St, Concord, New Hampshire (1966)
- New Hampshire Liquor Commission office building and warehouse, 50 Storrs St, Concord, New Hampshire (1966)
- Addition to Rundlett Middle School, 144 South St, Concord, New Hampshire (1967)
- Addition to Garrison School, 17 Knight St, Concord, New Hampshire (1967)
- Mary, Mother of the Church, 12 Amesbury Rd, Newton, New Hampshire (1967)
- Thomas J. McIntyre Federal Building, (Note: Designed in collaboration with Andrew C. Isaak Associates of Manchester. A contributing resource to the Portsmouth Downtown Historic District, NRHP-listed in 2017.) 80 Daniel St, Portsmouth, New Hampshire (1967)
- Memorial Union Building addition, University of New Hampshire, Durham, New Hampshire (1969)
- Merchants Bank Building, 1100 Elm St, Manchester, New Hampshire (1968)
- Gadbois Hall, Saint Anselm College, Goffstown, New Hampshire (1969)
- Somersworth National Bank Building, 1 John Parsons Dr, Somersworth, New Hampshire (1969)
- Somersworth Public Library, 25 Main St, Somersworth, New Hampshire (1969)
- Central Fire Station, 100 Merrimack St, Manchester, New Hampshire (1970–71)
- Nashua Community College, Nashua, New Hampshire (1970)
- United States Post Office, 196 Main St, Keene, New Hampshire (1970–71)
- St. Martin's Church, 120 Maple St, Somersworth, New Hampshire (1972)
- Norris Cotton Federal Building, 275 Chestnut St, Manchester, New Hampshire (1973–75)
