= OBO =

Obo or OBO may also refer to:

== As an acronym ==
- Bureau of Overseas Buildings Operations, in the U.S. Department of State
- Open Biomedical Ontologies, creating controlled vocabularies
- Oxford Bibliographies Online, by OUP
- Operated by others, a term used in the oil and gas industry
- Ore-bulk-oil carrier, a merchant vessel
- Or Best Offer, usually used on items description on online auction websites.

== As a code ==
- Tokachi-Obihiro Airport, Obihiro, Hokkaido, Japan, IATA code
- Manobo languages, ISO 639-3 code

== People ==
- Obo Addy (1936–2012), Ghanaian drummer and dancer
- Obo Aba Hisanjani (born 1949), Nigerian poet

== Other ==
- Obo II, the first American Cocker Spaniel
- Obo National Park, São Tomé and Príncipe
- Obo or ovoo (Mongolian: овоо, heap), a Mongolian shrine
- Obo, a town in the Central African Republic

== See also ==
- Oboe (disambiguation)
