= Eric T. Huddleston =

American architect

- Born: February 5, 1888; Winchester, Indiana
- Died: June 23, 1977 (aged 89); Lancaster, New Hampshire
- Occupation: Architect

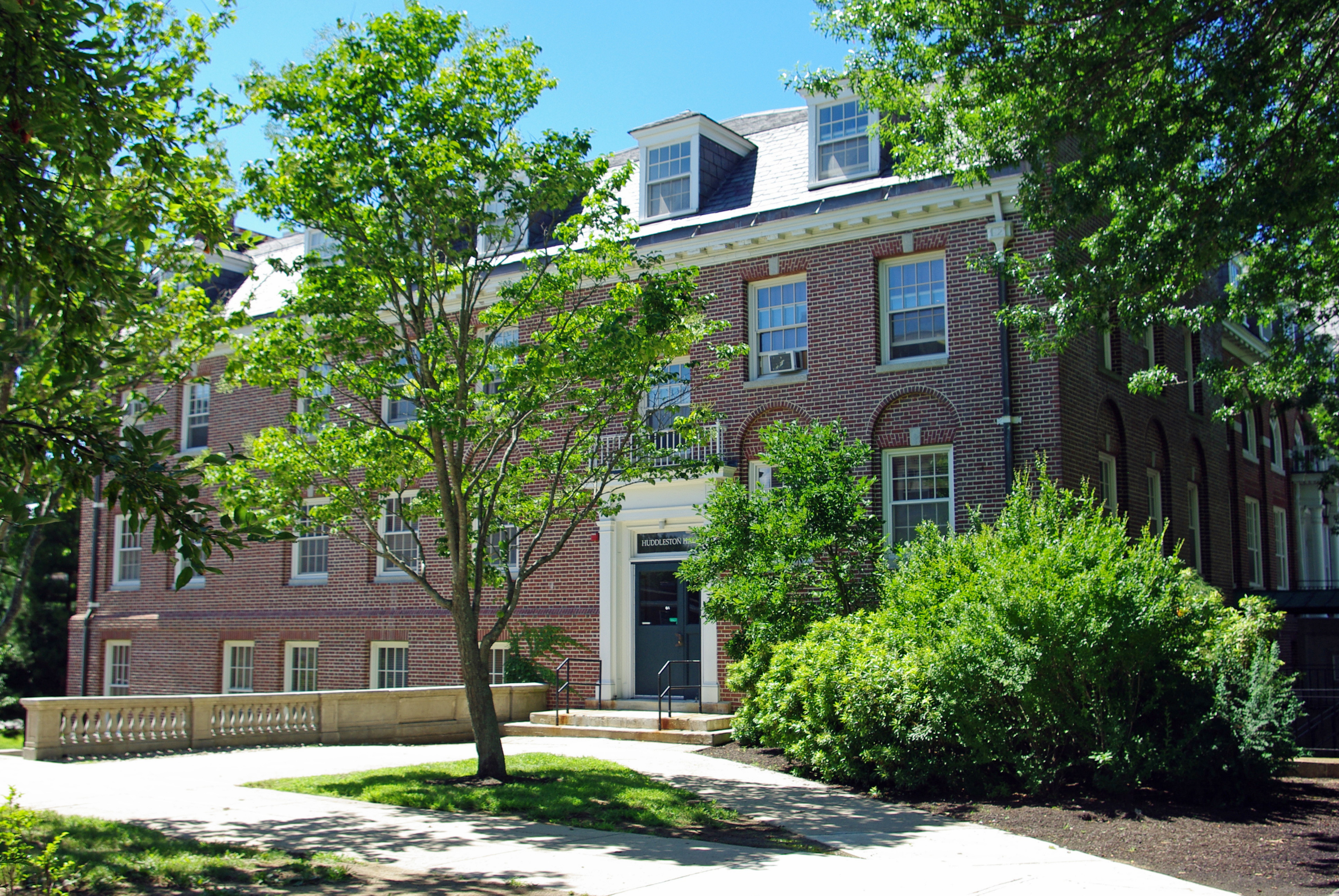
Huddleston Hall, formerly the Commons, on the campus of the University of New Hampshire. Designed by Huddleston in 1918 and rededicated in his honor in 1963.

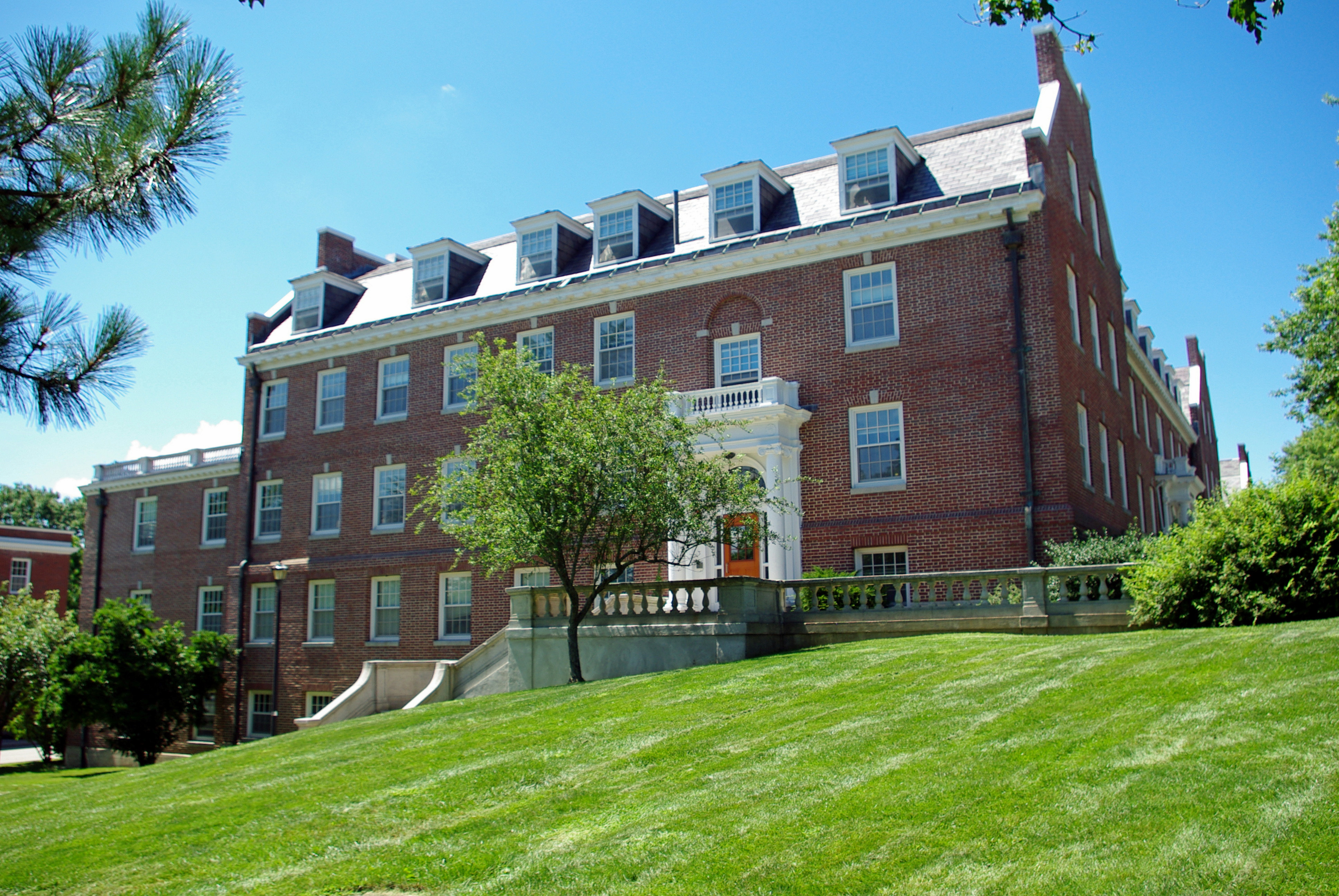
Hetzel Hall of the University of New Hampshire, completed in 1927.

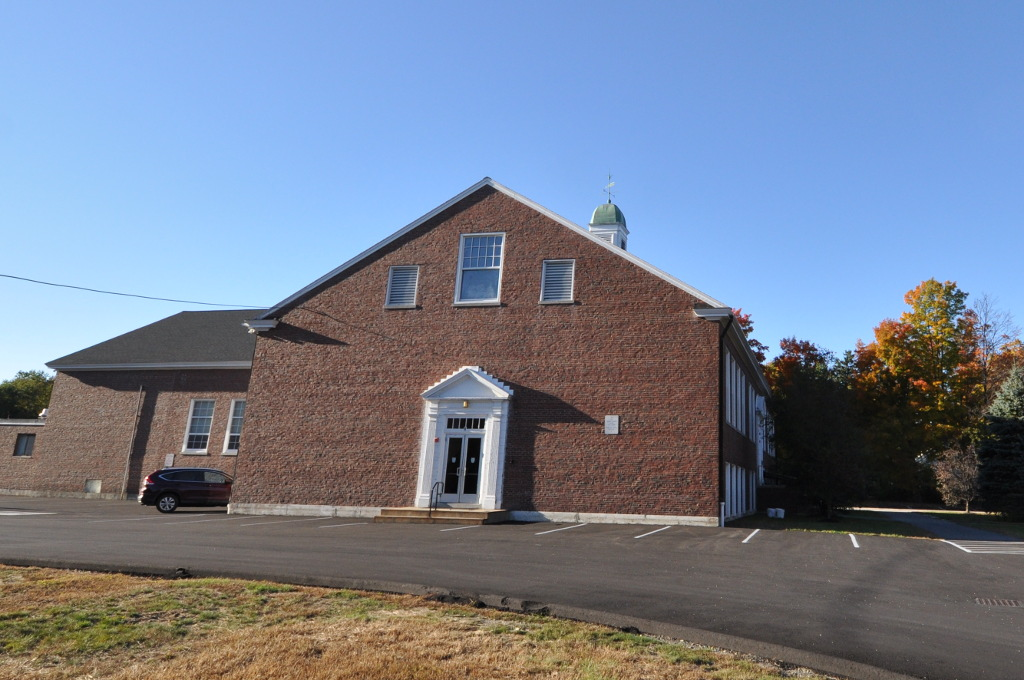
The Rollinsford Grade School in New Hampshire, completed in 1937.

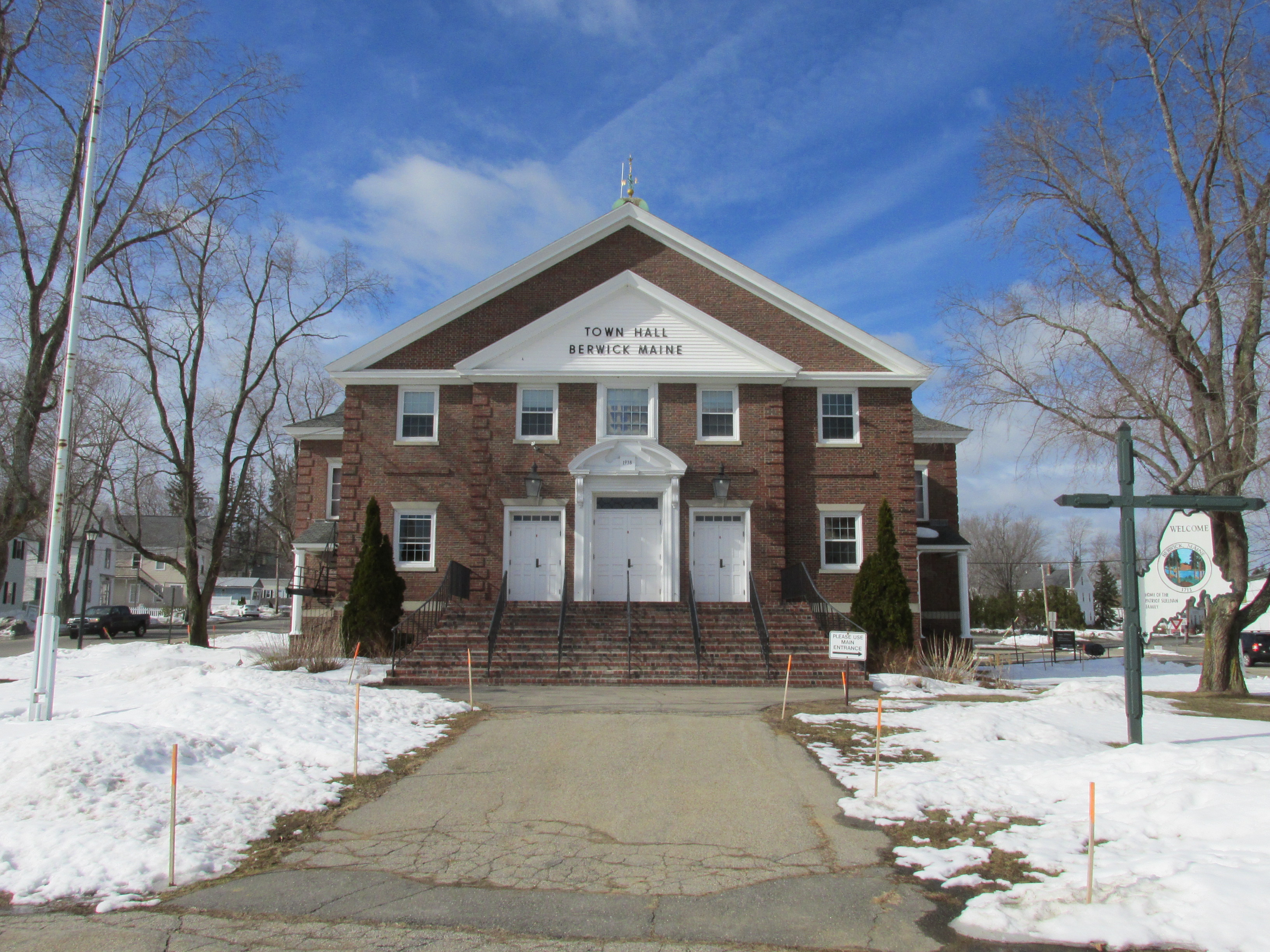
The Berwick Town Hall in Maine, completed in 1939.

Eric T. Huddleston FAIA (1888–1977) was an American architect. Huddleston is best known as the supervising architect of the University of New Hampshire from 1914 until 1949 and as a prominent proponent of Colonial Revival architecture.

== Early life and university career ==
Eric Trevor Huddleston was born February 5, 1888, in Winchester, Indiana. He was educated in the local public schools and at Cornell University, graduating in 1910. He worked as a drafter for Postle & Fisher in Chicago and for Albert Pretzinger and Schenck & Williams in Dayton, Ohio. In 1914 he left to open his own architecture office, but before he was able to do so he was recruited by Edward Thomson Fairchild, president of the University of New Hampshire, (Note: Known as the New Hampshire College of Agriculture and the Mechanic Arts until 1923.) to come to Durham to be head of the Department of Drawing and Design and to work as supervising architect of the university. In 1918 he expanded his department to include the only architectural school in northern New England. The first students of the architecture school graduated in 1920, and the last in 1943. In 1944, during World War II, the school was temporarily closed due to a lack of students. This was made permanent in 1946. As head of the Department of Drawing and Architecture, Huddleston educated some 120 students, many of which remained in New Hampshire to practice. These included Richard Koehler and Nicholas Isaak, partners in the leading local firm of Koehler & Isaak, and Irving W. Hersey, who was later Huddleston's business partner. He remained a member of the faculty until his retirement in 1958.

Prior to his arrival, the buildings of the university had been designed by private architects, especially the politically well-connected architect James E. Randlett. As supervising architect Huddleston was responsible for all architectural work on the campus. His first new building on the campus was a dining hall called the Commons, begun in 1918, which after his retirement he claimed as his favorite work. In 1919 he prepared a campus plan which guided campus development for the next thirty years. Huddleston's last works on the university campus were completed in 1946. Thereafter the university hired private architects to design its building, with Huddleston in an advisory role. He retired as supervising architect in 1949.

As supervising architect, Huddleston was a vocal proponent of traditional architectural styles, especially the Colonial Revival style.

== Private practice ==
In 1935, during the Great Depression, Huddleston realized his earlier plans to practice privately. In partnership with Irving W. Hersey, his former student, he established the firm of Huddleston & Hersey in Durham. They were responsible for a number of New Deal-funded projects, including the Rollinsford Grade School in New Hampshire and the Berwick Town Hall in Maine. During the 1930s, Huddleston & Hersey was the largest architecture firm in the state. Hersey left in 1942 to serve in World War II, and Huddleston temporarily retired from private practice in 1945. In 1948 he rejoined Hersey in his new firm, Irving W. Hersey Associates, as consulting architect. He remained with Hersey until his retirement in 1966.

== Honors and legacy ==
Huddleston joined the American Institute of Architects in 1929, and was first president of the New Hampshire chapter when it was formed in 1948. In 1953 he was elected a Fellow, the first New Hampshire architect to receive the honor. In 1963 his first university building, the Commons, was rededicated in his honor as Huddleston Hall.

== Personal life ==
In 1913 Huddleston was married to Mabel Sprague, and they had two children. During their residence in Durham the family lived in a house at 29 Mill Road, which Huddleston designed and had built in 1922. In 1966 Huddleston and his wife retired to Lancaster, New Hampshire, where he died June 23, 1977.

== Architectural works ==
=== As supervising architect ===
- Huddleston Hall (1919)
- Congreve Hall (1920)
- Hetzel Hall (1927)
- Murkland Hall (1927)
- James Hall (1930)
- Hood House (1931–32)
- Scott Hall (1933)
- Field House (1937)
- Pettee Hall (1938)
- Thompson Hall remodeling (1940, NRHP 1996)
- Gibbs, Engelhardt and Hunter Halls (1946)

=== As private practitioner ===
- Rollinsford Grade School, 487 Locust St, Rollinsford, New Hampshire (1936–37, NRHP 2015)
- Berwick Town Hall, 11 Sullivan St, Berwick, Maine (1938–39)
- Ossipee Public Library, 74 Main St, Ossipee, New Hampshire (1938–39)
- Auburn Village School, 11 Eaton Hill Rd, Auburn, New Hampshire (1940)
