= Joshua Wentworth House =

- Formerly listed on the U.S. National Register of Historic Places
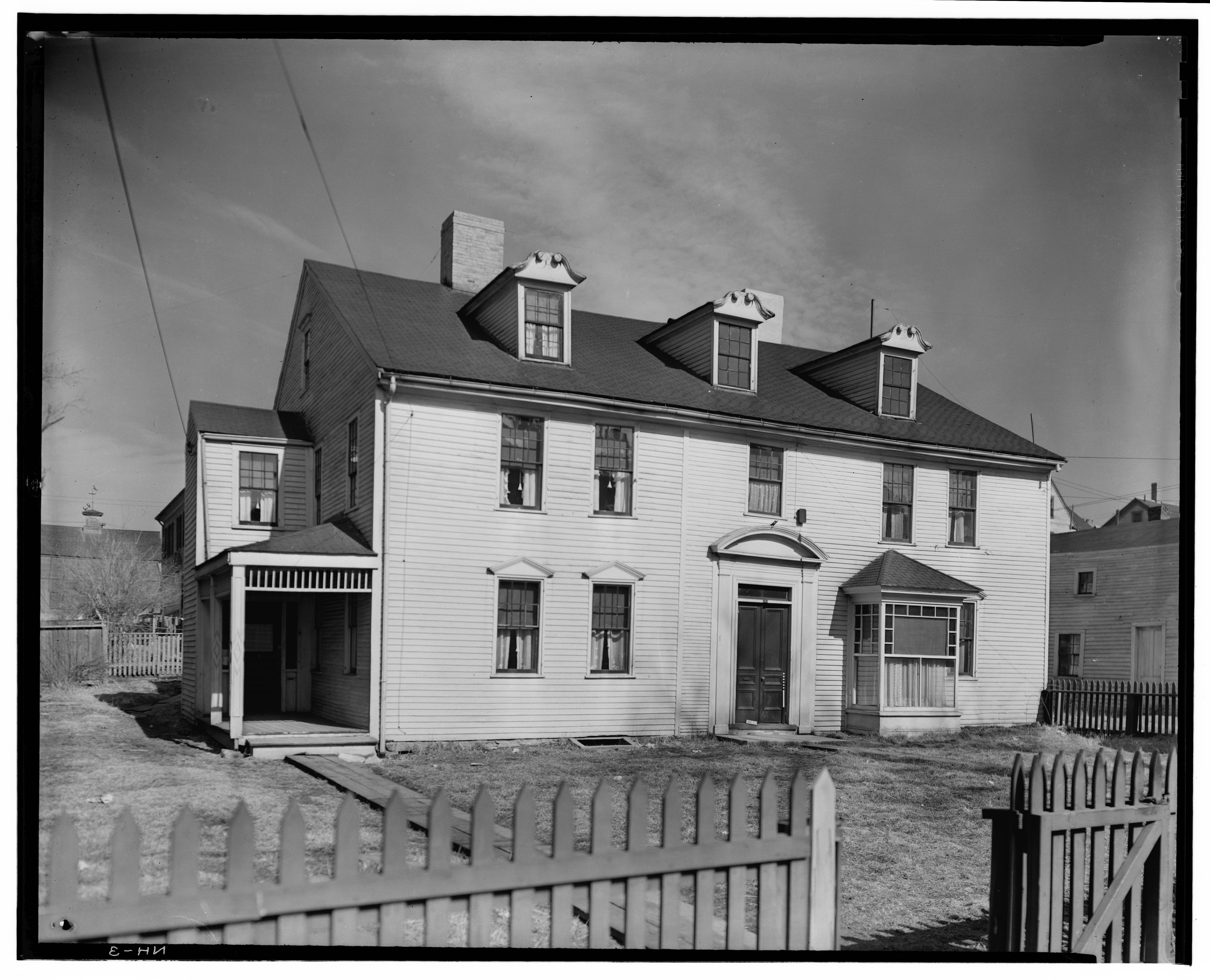
- Joshua Wentworth House, 1937

- Location within New Hampshire Location within the United States
- Location: 119 Hanover Street, Portsmouth, New Hampshire
- Coordinates: 43.07748°N 70.76030°W
- Built: 1770
- Architectural style: Georgian
- NRHP reference No.: 71001097

Significant dates
- Added to NRHP: July 2, 1971
- Removed from NRHP: 1975

The Joshua Wentworth House is an historic building in Portsmouth, New Hampshire, which was formerly individually listed in the National Register of Historic Places (NRHP). The building was again listed in 1975 as a contributing resource to the Strawbery Banke Historic District, and is a contributing resource to the Portsmouth Downtown Historic District placed on the NRHP in 2017.

== Description ==
The building, erected in 1770, previously was located at 119 Hanover Street in Portsmouth, New Hampshire. Joshua Wentworth (1742–c. 1809), namesake of the house, was a grandson of John Wentworth (1671–1730), who had served as Lieutenant Governor for the Province of New Hampshire. The house has similarities to the Gov. John Wentworth House and the Wentworth-Gardner House, both of which are also located in Portsmouth.

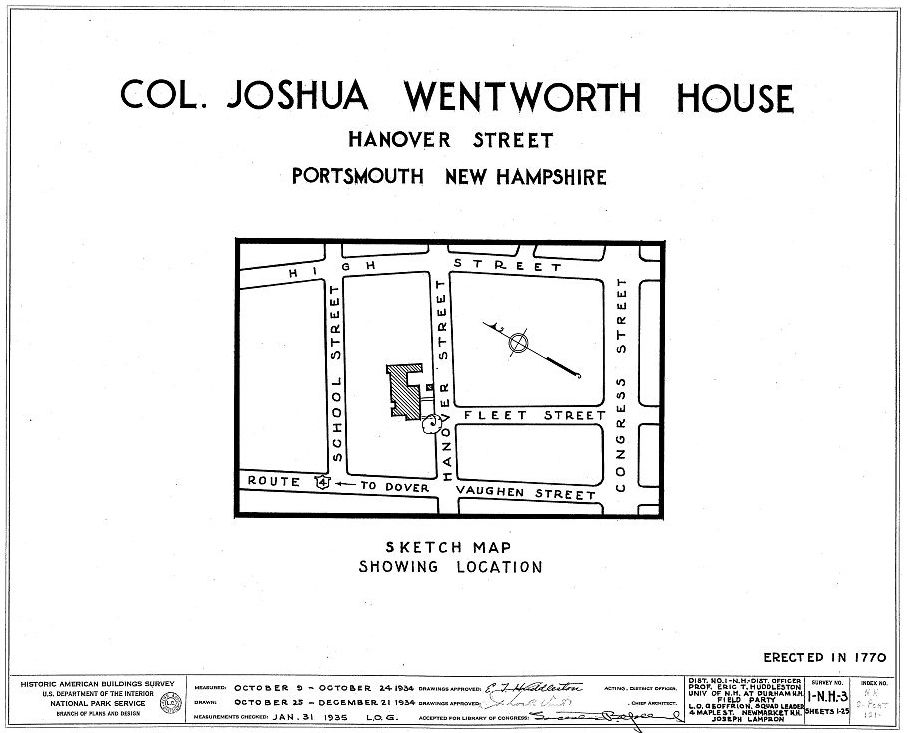
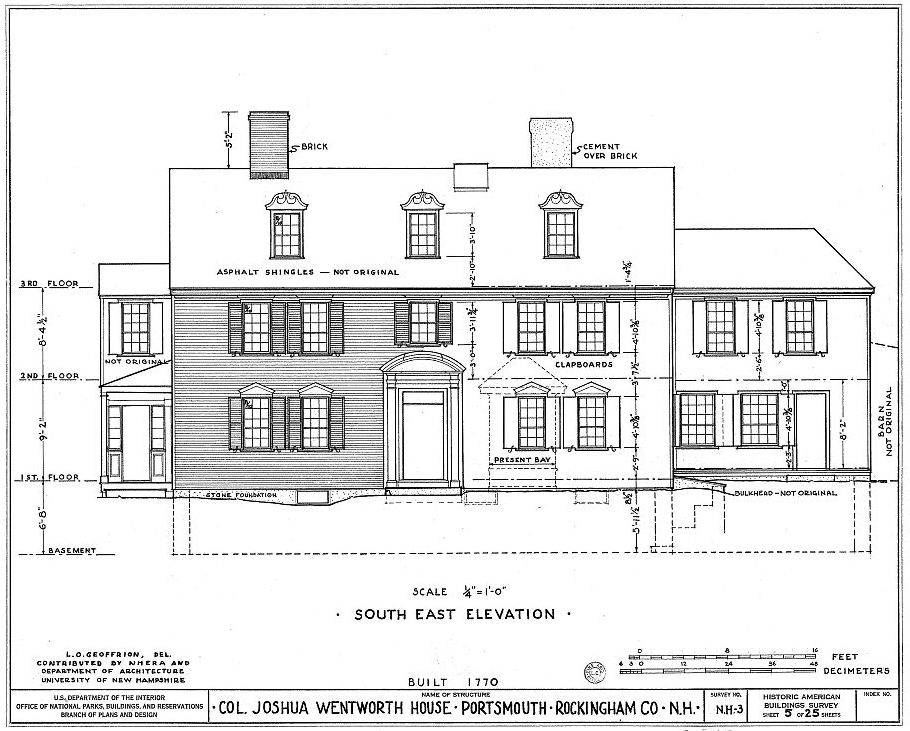
1934 map (left) and front elevation drawing by the Historic American Buildings Survey

In 1970, the organization overseeing the Strawbery Banke historic district in Portsmouth undertook an effort to save the house, as it was threatened with destruction as part of an urban renewal project. Organizers initially planned to cut the house in half to relocate it, and sought to raise $70,000 for the move. The building itself was donated to Strawbery Banke, Inc. While a move date of May 1971 was set, that plan did not come to fruition. The house was subsequently listed in the National Register of Historic Places on July 2, 1971.

In May 1973, due to logistical difficulties with potentially moving the house across the city of Portsmouth by land, the possibility of moving it on a barge via the Piscataqua River was considered. The building, with an estimated weight of 190 short tons (170,000 kg) including its chimney, was moved the following month, with a significant part of the journey being on a barge. The house was de-listed from the National Register of Historic Places in 1975.

Since the move, the building has been located at 27 Hancock Street in Portsmouth. The Strawbery Banke organization undertook a restoration effort on the house in 1980. Work on the house yielded more insight about its history: originally built as a single-family house, it was converted into a duplex in 1820, and later served as a tenement, bakery, and finally as a newspaper office. As of January 2018, the Joshua Wentworth House was privately owned.

== See also ==
- National Register of Historic Places listings in Rockingham County, New Hampshire
