= Sprocker =

Sprocker may refer to:

- Sprocker Spaniel, a cross between a springer spaniel and a cocker spaniel
- Sprocker a minor character in Masters of the Universe
