= Majeski =

Majeski is a surname. Notable people with the surname include:

- Alexander John Majeski (1920-1974), American architect
- Amanda Majeski (born c. 1985), American operatic soprano
- Hank Majeski (1916–1991), American baseball player
- Ty Majeski (born 1994), American stock car racing driver
