= Cape Cod Freedoms =

US professional ice hockey team

The Cape Cod Freedoms (also known as the New Hampshire Freedoms) were a professional ice hockey team in South Yarmouth, Massachusetts. They also played games in Manchester, New Hampshire, and Concord, New Hampshire. They were a member of the Northeastern Hockey League during the 1978–79 season. The team played their home games in the Cape Cod Coliseum, John F. Kennedy Memorial Coliseum, and Everett Arena.
