= Rollinsford Grade School =

- U.S. National Register of Historic Places
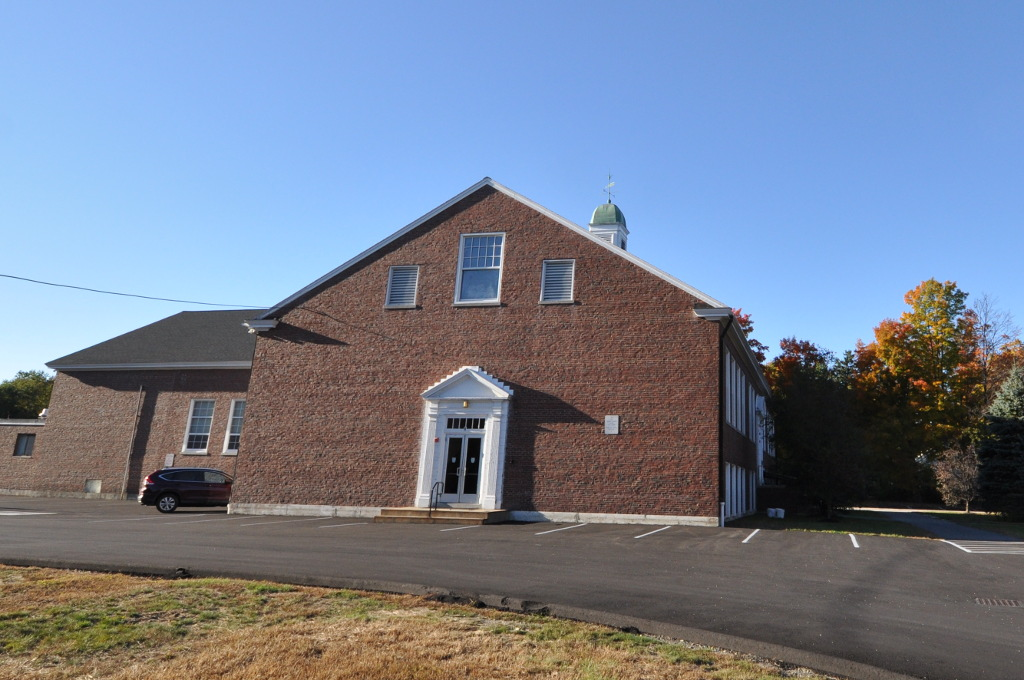
- Side view

- Location within New Hampshire Location within the United States
- Location: 487 Locust St., Rollinsford, New Hampshire
- Coordinates: 43°13′55″N 70°49′24″W
- Area: 4 acres (1.6 ha)
- Built: 1936
- Architect: Huddleston & Hersey
- Architectural style: Colonial Revival
- NRHP reference No.: 15000670
- Added to NRHP: September 29, 2015

The Rollinsford Grade School is a historic school building at 487 Locust Street in Rollinsford, New Hampshire. Opened in 1937, and still in use as an elementary school, it was the first school building commissioned by the prominent Durham firm Huddleston & Hersey, whose principal, Eric T. Huddleston, designed many buildings for the University of New Hampshire as the first campus architect. The grounds of the school are also notable as the burial site of Obo II, considered the father of the American Cocker Spaniel breed of dog. The property was listed with statewide significance on the National Register of Historic Places in 2015.

== Description and history ==
The Rollinsford Grade School stands in a residential area south of Rollinsford's town center, at the junction of Locust and Willey streets. The school is a two-story structure, built with a steel frame with walls of terra-cotta tiles veneered with brick. It is Colonial Revival in style, with a particularly fine entrance surround. Modern aluminum-and-glass doors are flanked by Corinthian pilasters, and topped by a transom window and arched pediment. Its gable roof is topped by a functional cupola, a signature element of its architect, Eric T. Huddleston. The original main block is extended to the rear by two additions, made in 1965 and 1998. The interior retains most of its original finishes.

Prior to the school's construction the property was used for agriculture. It was built in 1936 to consolidate the town's village school and two district schoolhouses into a single location. It was designed by Huddleston & Hersey of nearby Durham. It was the first major school commission of that firm, serving as a prototype for numerous schools and civic buildings in New Hampshire, Massachusetts, and southwestern Maine. It was one of two structures in the town built with funding support from the Public Works Administration, a New Deal jobs program. Although it initially housed grades one through eight, it now houses grade one through six. Students in the higher grades are sent to the schools of adjacent towns.

Near the rear of the grounds of the school is the grave of Obo II. It consists of a marble marker set on a granite plinth. The marker is engraved with the following inscription: "Obo II / A.K.C. Number 4911 / Died January 2, 1895".

== See also ==
- National Register of Historic Places listings in Strafford County, New Hampshire
