= Virginia Huntington Robie =

American writer

- Robie pictured around 1930
- Born: October 18, 1868; Rollinsford, New Hampshire, U.S.
- Died: April 1, 1957 (aged 88); Fort Myers, Florida, U.S.
- Occupation(s): Author, lecturer

Virginia Huntington Robie (October 18, 1868 – April 1, 1957) was an American writer and academic. She was the editor and author of several publications, including The Century Magazine and House & Garden.

== Life and career ==
Robie was born in Rollinsford, New Hampshire, to Thomas Sargent Robie and Virginia Dare Pendleton. Her mother was a native of Camden, Maine. Her parents married in her father's hometown of Gorham, Maine, on September 21, 1859. Robie was the third of their four known children, born after Thomas Sargent Jr. and Lewis Pendleton, and before George Pendleton.

She received her preparatory education at Newberry Seminary in Boston, Massachusetts, amongst several other public and private institutions. She later attended the School of Decorative Design and Applied Ornament at the Art Institute of Chicago.

Robie wrote Studies of Art in American Life–V: An American Aristocracy in a 1901 edition of Brush & Pencil.

In 1903, she became the associate editor for House Beautiful, a role in which she remained for the next decade. Between 1913 and 1924, she was the department editor for Keith magazine.

Her father died in Chicago on March 25, 1906; her mother in 1929, aged 91 or 92.

=== Writing ===
Robie was the author of several books, including Historical Styles in Furniture (1904 and 1916), By-paths in Collecting (1912), Quest of the Quaint (1916–1927), Sketches of Manatee (1920), The New Architectural Development in Florida (1922), The Story of Coral Gavels (1923), A Century of Miniature Painting (1939), Baroque: A Second Blooming (1941), Looking Backward (1947) and the semi-autobiographical Pennyroyal (1953).

She also wrote children's plays, fairytales, book reviews, as well as contributing to Country Life, The Century Magazine, International Studio, House & Garden, Ladies' Home Journal, the World Book Encyclopedia and Légion d'honneur.

=== Education ===
In 1928, Robie became an associate of Rollins College in Winter Park, Florida, at the request of Hamilton Holt. She later became the college's interior designer (notable of Pugsley Hall and Mayflower Hall) while doubling as its assistant professor of art between 1932 and 1938. She became associate professor of art between 1938 and 1944. Upon her retirement, she was awarded the title of Professor Emeritus of Art, an honor she held for the rest of her life.

She received the Algernon Sydney Sullivan medallion in 1935 for her work at Rollins.

== Death ==
Robie died on April 1, 1957, aged 88. She had been living with her last surviving brother, Thomas, in Fort Myers, Florida. She is interred in Oakridge-Glen Oak Cemetery in Hillside, Illinois, alongside her parents.
