= Bite inhibition =

Animal behavior management

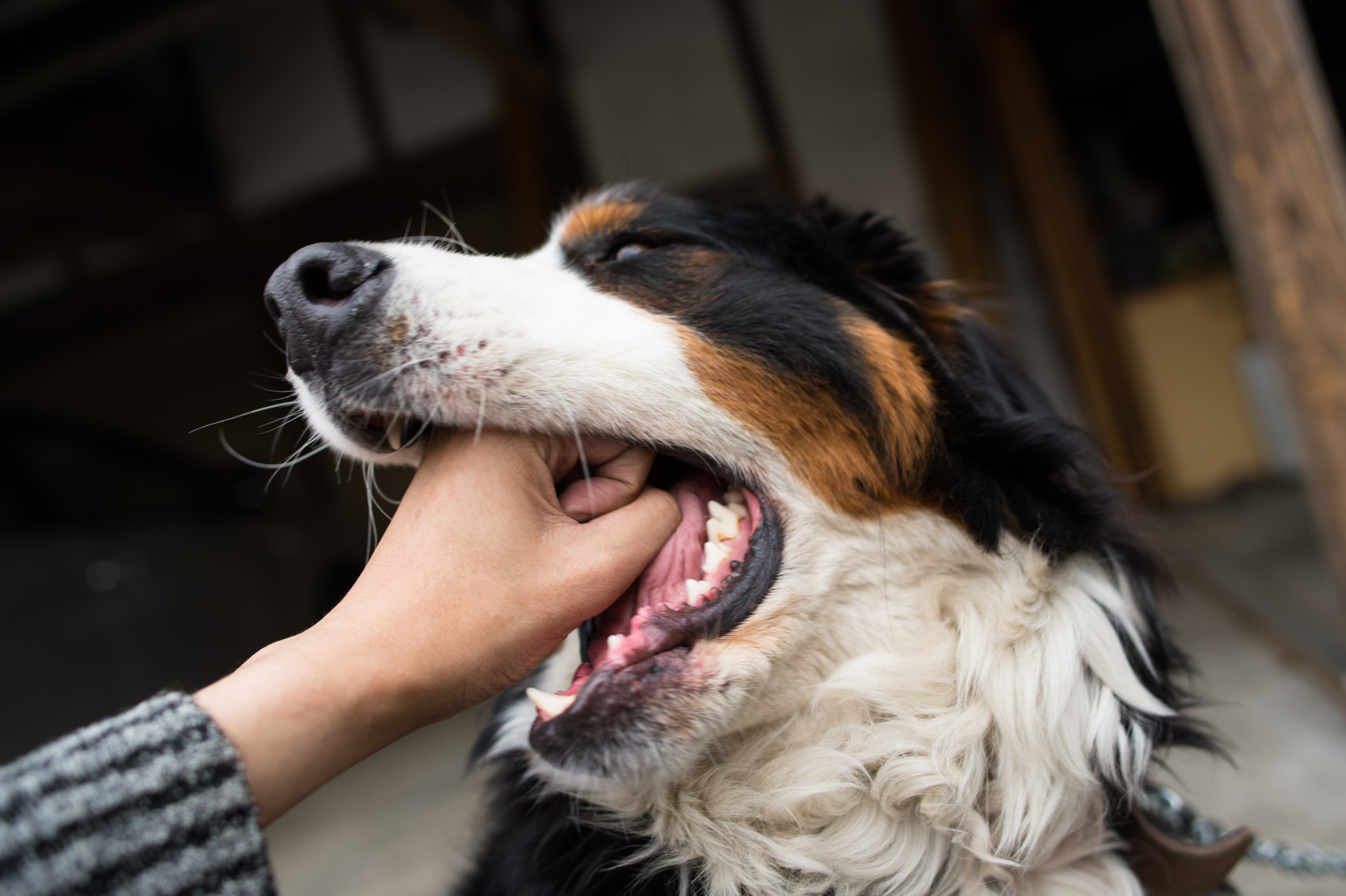
A trained dog with owner

Bite inhibition, sometimes referred to as a soft mouth (a term which also has a distinct meaning), is a behavior in carnivorans (dogs, cats, etc.) whereby the animal learns to moderate the strength of its bite. It is an important factor in the socialization of pets.

Bite inhibition is typically learned as part of juvenile play behaviors, when the animal is still in the company of its mother and siblings: by biting each other during play, the young animals learn that biting a companion too strongly leads to the abrupt termination of play activities.

Bite inhibition is an important factor in the socialization of pets because many breeds do not innately have the ability to moderate the strength of their bites. In addition to its role in domestication, bite inhibition is also a significant part of the development of dominance hierarchy in wild animals such as wolves.

== Evolution of bite inhibition in modern dogs ==
Modern dogs learn bite inhibition for the same reason that their ancestors, the wolves, did: in order to establish an effective dominance hierarchy. It allows for tranquility in large groups when each individual knows its place. Dominance hierarchies may be formed in groups of canines through intense displays of aggression. However, this type of vying for dominance has only been observed in forced groupings of captive wolves. In the wild, this trend is less common, as wolves tend to group off into family units instead of unrelated adults. Therefore, the alpha male and alpha female would simply be the parents, and the offspring would submit readily. Bite inhibition, then, naturally occurs as the pups learn not to bite their siblings and parents too hard.

=== Lorenz vs. Schenkel: Interpreting canine aggression ===
Austrian scientist Konrad Lorenz explains that the inferior animal shows its most vulnerable part to the superior animal as an act of submission. The superior animal could, in theory, kill the other immediately, but instead shows mercy to the inferior animal. Submission was thought to reduce losses for an animal that knows it cannot challenge the other.

A few years later, this idea was challenged by Rudolf Schenkel, who suggests that, contrary to Lorenz's beliefs, the inferior dog is the one with his jaws open near to the superior's neck. The superior canine remains growling and his posture is erect, as though to prepare for an attack. Schenkel suggests that the bite inhibition in this instance is shown by the inferior to show that he does not dare to bite the superior.

=== Chemicals involved in aggression ===
Testosterone has a major effect on aggression in animals. Dogs with excess testosterone are found to act out violently, and are far less likely to practice bite inhibition, especially without proper training.

In observations of a wild population of gray wolves, or canis lupus, levels of adrenal glucocorticoid (GCs) were found to be elevated in dominant wolves. GCs affect the stress responses in vertebrates, redirecting energy from systems such as the digestive and reproductive to the senses and heart to eliminate immediate threats.

However, while short-term increases in GCs can be beneficial under stress, long-term increases are harmful to health, as GCs contribute to immune and reproductive system suppression, as well as loss in muscle mass. Therefore, being a dominant individual in the pack has a high cost (and high benefit), while accepting subordination is low cost-low benefit.

Catecholamines, such as epinephrine, or adrenaline, norepinephrine, and dopamine, also have effects on aggression. An increase in catecholamines assist with the body's fight-or-flight response by increasing blood flow to the muscles, decreasing pain sensitivity, and improving attention. Dogs with higher levels of these chemicals tend to be more aggressive, because they are more ready to fight.

== Soft mouth ==
The term "soft mouth" is used by breeders and users of hunting dogs to refer to a behavioral tendency to pick up, hold, and carry quarry gently. It is not a preferred characteristic of terriers and ratters, who are expected to roughly shake and mangle pests such as rats and snakes in order to kill them quickly and efficiently. It is desirable in gundogs such as retrievers and spaniels which are expected to produce quarry intact and in good condition, and is a notoriously difficult behavior to teach to a dog without an inborn temperament to do so. As a result, breeders and users of gun dogs arrived on this term to describe a characteristic important to this enterprise. Dog breeds known for producing more soft-mouthed individuals include Golden Retrievers, Labrador Retrievers, Cocker Spaniels, Poodles, and Gordon Setters, but in any litter some individuals may be much less soft-mouthed than others, as there may be relatively soft-mouthed individuals in a litter of even classically hard-mouthed breeds such as Jack Russell Terriers or Mastiffs.

== Training ==
Bite inhibition is typically learned as part of juvenile play behaviors, when the animal is still in the company of its mother and siblings: by biting each other during play, the young animals learn that biting a companion too strongly leads to the abrupt termination of play activities. This behavior is crucial later in life, as well, when dogs need to maintain the carefully constructed dominance hierarchies. Therefore, a useful method for training a puppy or dog to monitor the strength of its bite would simply be to ignore the dog immediately after the incident occurs. This way, the dog learns that harmful biting will lead to punishment.

A dog's first instinct to unpleasant stimulus is not a bite. A dog will use several techniques to stop a perceived threat before resorting to biting. Therefore, it is important to avoid suppressing important canine communications such as growling and snarling. If a dog learns that a growl is an inappropriate response to a threat, then humans may be encountered with an unexpected bite when they accidentally, for example, step on the dog's tail. Even a dog that would never bite out of anger can snap when met with a painful or threatening stimulus, so training in bite inhibition can be useful to keep them from accidentally hurting another dog or human.
