= Salmon Falls Mill Historic District =

Historic district in New Hampshire, United States

- U.S. National Register of Historic Places
- U.S. Historic district
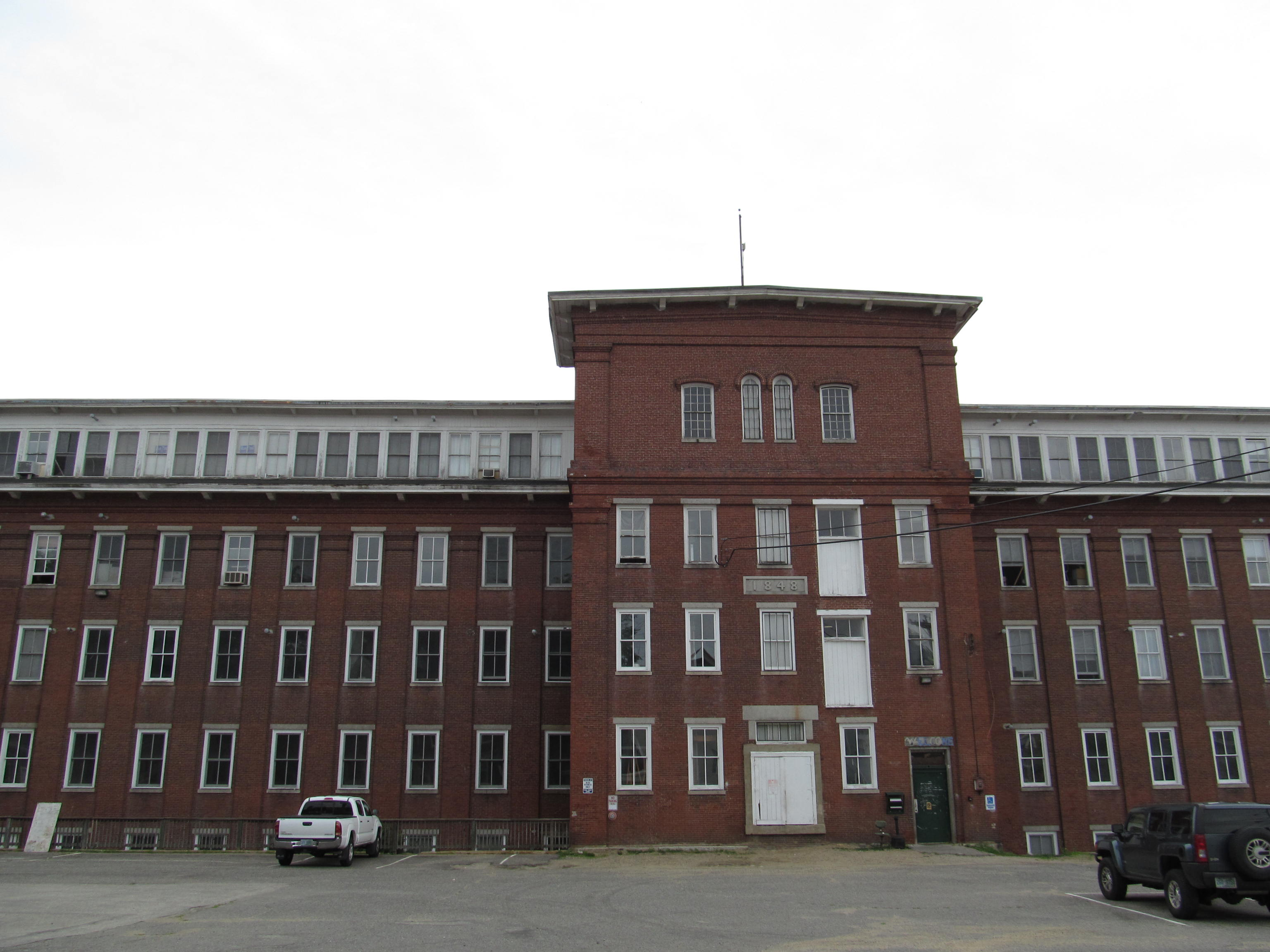

- Location within New Hampshire Location within the United States
- Location: Front St., Rollinsford, New Hampshire
- Coordinates: 43°14′10″N 70°49′5″W
- Area: 14 acres (5.7 ha)
- Built: 1848
- Architectural style: Italianate, Greek Revival
- NRHP reference No.: 80000315
- Added to NRHP: February 29, 1980

The Salmon Falls Mill Historic District encompasses a historic mill complex on Front Street in Rollinsford, New Hampshire. The complex includes four major structures and seven smaller ones, on about 14 acres (5.7 ha) of land along the Salmon Falls River. They were built between about 1840 and the mid-1860s, and have an unusual architectural unity, for additions made to the buildings were done with attention to matching design elements from the existing structures. The Number 2 Mill, built in 1848, was an early location where a turbine was used instead of a waterwheel to provide power to the mill machinery. The district was listed on the National Register of Historic Places in 1980.

== Description and history ==
The area that is now Rollinsford was settled in the 1620s, and the site of the present Salmon Mills complex has a documented history of industrial use since 1623-24, when the Salmon Falls River was first dammed and a sawmill built. In 1822 the water privilege was purchased by a Portsmouth merchant, who established a successful woolen mill. It burned in 1834, but was soon replaced by a cotton mill. That mill was eventually purchased by a partnership including Amos Lawrence, a major Boston, Massachusetts textile industrialist. Eventually incorporated as the Salmon Falls Manufacturing Company, Lawrence and his associates built a new mill (the present Number 2 building), and introduced new technology perfected at Lowell, Massachusetts including the turbine. A fire in 1864 destroyed the original Number 1 mill. The Salmon Falls Manufacturing Company ended production in 1927, and the buildings have since seen other industrial uses.

The historic district consists of eleven buildings and structures, most of which are set between Front Street and the river. The concrete dam spanning the river, built as a replacement of a wooden dam around 1910, is included in the district, as is the railroad bridge just downstream. One building, a cotton warehouse, is located across Front Street. The buildings exhibit a remarkable unity of style despite a construction history spanning more than 50 years, with most buildings built of brick in an industrial Italianate style.

== See also ==
- National Register of Historic Places listings in Strafford County, New Hampshire
