= John F. Kennedy Memorial Coliseum =

Indoor arena in Manchester, New Hampshire

Coordinates: 42°59′0″N 71°27′17″W

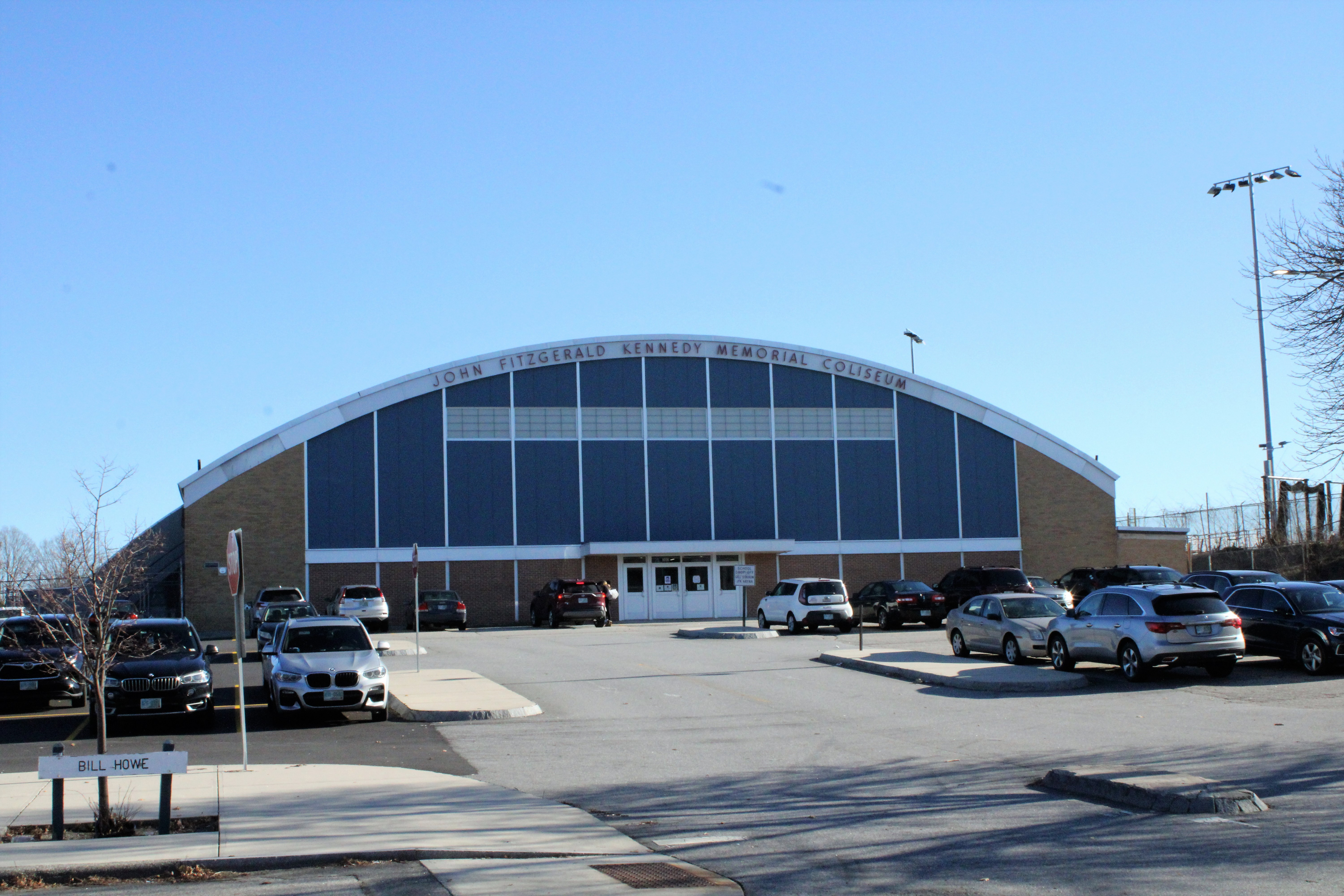
John F. Kennedy Memorial Coliseum

John F. Kennedy Memorial Coliseum is an indoor arena in Manchester, New Hampshire, United States. It hosted the Northeastern Hockey League's Cape Cod Freedoms in 1979. The arena holds 1,600 people and opened in 1963. It has hosted numerous events including concerts, wrestling and high school graduations. It was the primary entertainment venue in the city until the SNHU Arena opened on Elm Street.

The JFK Memorial Coliseum is currently home to multiple ice hockey teams. The newly formed Manchester High School unified boys and the Trinity High School Pioneers boys hockey teams play all their home games at JFK, affectionately referred to as "The J". The Manchester unified girls team also call the J home. Each spring the coliseum hosts the NHIAA Boys High School Semifinals. The Manchester Flames youth hockey team also uses the rink for some home games. The Southern New Hampshire Skating Club also uses the ice for figure skating practices and exhibitions. During days when there are no hockey games scheduled, the JFK Coliseum operates as an ice-skating rink.

New Hampshire Roller Derby practices there multiple times a week, as well as hosts home games throughout their season.
