= Goffstown High School =

- Goffstown High School

Location
- 27 Wallace Road; Goffstown, New Hampshire 03045; United States; 43°00′45″N 71°35′00″W

Information
- School district: SAU #19
- Principal: Timothy Girzone
- Teaching staff: 82.00 (FTE)
- Grades: 9 to 12
- Enrollment: 1,037 (2023–2024)
- Student to teacher ratio: 12.65
- Campus: Suburban
- Colors: Maroon; White
- Athletics: Class-I
- Mascot: The Grizz
- Website: www.sau19.org/index.php/en/schools-home-2/goffstown/goffstown-high-school

Goffstown High School, located in Goffstown, New Hampshire, United States, serves the towns of Goffstown and New Boston. Goffstown High School had 1,106 students enrolled as of July 1, 2018. The student body consists of 48% male and 52% female students.

== History ==
The high school was formerly located at 12 Reed Street in the center of Goffstown. The structure, built in 1925, became the Upper Elementary School when the new high school was built. Following the construction of Mountain View Middle School, the former high school building, which is listed on the National Register of Historic Places, was converted into senior housing, and is now known as The Meetinghouse at Goffstown. The present high school was built in 1963 to the designs of Alexander John Majeski.

== Administration ==
The school's principal is Frank McBride.

== Athletics ==
Goffstown High School competes in NHIAA Division 1. The following sports are offered at GHS:

Fall

- Cross Country: Boys & Girls Varsity
- Field Hockey: Varsity, Junior Varsity
- Football: Varsity, Junior Varsity, Freshmen
- Golf: Varsity, Junior Varsity
- Soccer: Girls & Boys Varsity, Junior Varsity
- Fall Spirit: Co-ed Varsity, Junior Varsity
- Volleyball: Girls Varsity, Junior Varsity

Winter

- Bowling: Co-ed
- Alpine Ski Team: Boys & Girls Varsity
- Basketball: Boys & Girls Varsity, Junior Varsity, Freshmen
- Gymnastics: Varsity
- Ice Hockey: Varsity, Junior Varsity
- Winter Spirit: Varsity, Junior Varsity
- Swimming: Boys & Girls Varsity
- Indoor Track: Boys & Girls
- Wrestling: Varsity, Junior Varsity

Spring

- Baseball: Varsity, Junior Varsity
- Lacrosse: Boys & Girls Varsity, Junior Varsity
- Softball: Varsity, Junior Varsity
- Tennis: Boys & Girls Varsity
- Track: Boys & Girls Varsity
- Volleyball: Boys Varsity, Junior Varsity

== Notable alumni ==
- Sandeep Parikh, actor, writer, and director
- Mark Warburton, gymnast
