= Upper Elementary School (Goffstown, New Hampshire) =

- Goffstown High School
- U.S. National Register of Historic Places
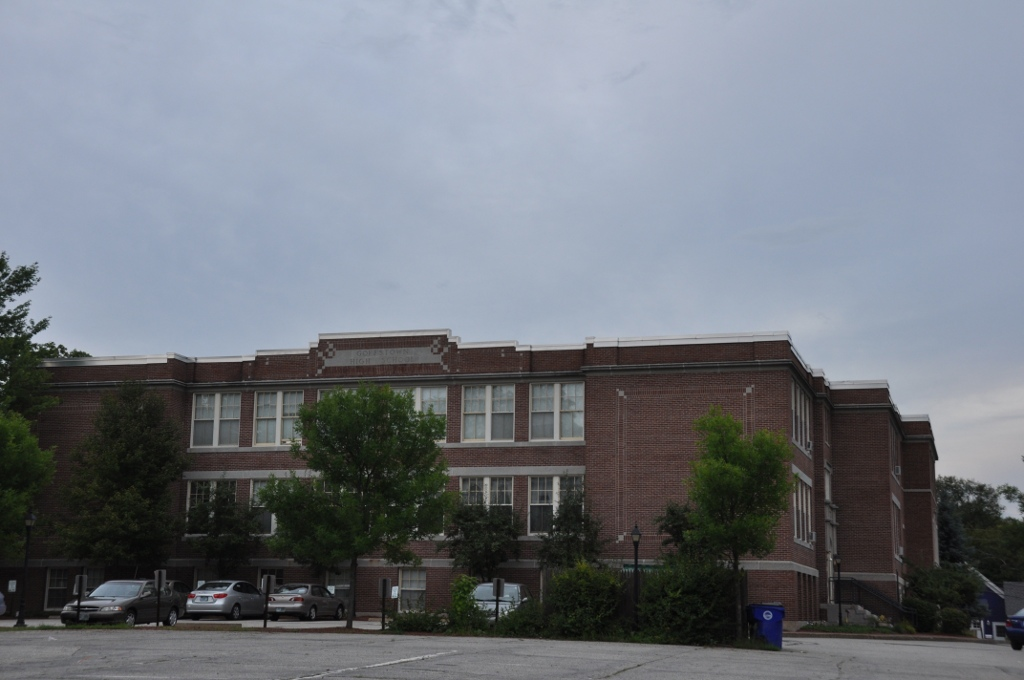

- Location within New Hampshire Location within the United States
- Location: 12 Reed St; Goffstown, New Hampshire
- Coordinates: 43°01′10″N 71°35′52″W
- Area: 1.13 acres (0.46 ha)
- Built: 1925
- Architectural style: Collegiate Gothic
- NRHP reference No.: 97001524
- Added to NRHP: December 19, 1997

The Upper Elementary School, listed on the National Register of Historic Places as the Goffstown High School, is a historic school building located at 12 Reed Street in the center of Goffstown, New Hampshire. The building was constructed in 1925 and served as the town's first purpose-built high school until the opening of the present high school on Wallace Road in 1965. The building, renamed "Upper Elementary School", then served the town's intermediate-grade students until the opening of Mountain View Middle School. The building has since been converted into senior housing and is now known as The Meetinghouse at Goffstown. It was listed on the National Register in 1997.

== Description and history ==
The former Upper Elementary School is located in the central village of Goffstown, at the junction of School and Reed Streets. It is a three-story brick structure, laid out in a U shape with a relatively narrow opening to the north, with a flat roof. Stylistically it is a simplified version of the Collegiate Gothic, with windows set in openings that have stone sills and lintels, sometimes set in groups. The main entrance is in a south-facing projecting section, with a three-bay opening now housing only a single entrance in the center bay. The outside of the frame has stone quoining, and each bay is topped by a shouldered stone moulding. A stone cornice separates the entrance from the second floor, where a central window repeats the stone quoining, and is topped by a keystoned lintel.

The school was built in 1925 at a cost of $20,000, and was the town's first purpose-built high school, housing grades 5 through 12. It was enlarged significantly in 1949, adding a wing with additional classrooms, gymnasium, and auditorium. Grades 5 and 6 were moved to the adjacent White School in 1936, and the school was converted to an elementary school after the new high school opened in 1965. It was closed in 1991, and was subsequently converted into senior housing.

== See also ==
- National Register of Historic Places listings in Hillsborough County, New Hampshire
