= Obo II =

Obo
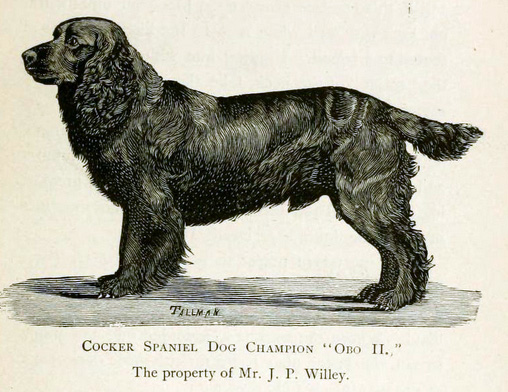
- Ch. Obo, foundation sire of the American Cocker Spaniel.
- Species: Canis familiaris
- Breed: American Cocker Spaniel
- Sex: Male
- Born: August 7, 1882
- Died: January 2, 1895 (aged 12)
- Resting place: Rollinsford, New Hampshire
- Nationality: United States
- Notable role: Show dog
- Known for: Foundation sire of the American Cocker Spaniel breed
- Owner: Mr J.P. Willey
- Parents: Oboe (sire), Chloe II (dam)
- Weight: 23 lb (10 kg)
- Height: 10 in (25 cm) at the withers

Ch. Obo (1882–1895) was an American Cocker Spaniel who is considered to be the father of the modern breed, though physically, he was different from today's American Cocker. During his day, he was a successful show dog, winner of many Best-in-Show titles.

== Background ==
The Obo kennel of Spaniels were owned by James Farrow, who was breeding dogs from the 1870s onwards. Obo's sire and namesake, Obo, was whelped on June 14, 1879. F. E. Schofield, an authority on Spaniels, wrote, "Obo, it goes without saying, was the greatest force in the revival of the Cocker." Obo was so well known for his victories in conformation shows that his owner, Farrow, spoke of an offer made from America, "The dog's stock did so well in America that one hundred guineas was offered by an American breeder for the use of this Spaniel for one season's stud service. The offer was refused."

== Birth and career ==
J. P. Willey of Salmon Falls, New Hampshire, was already a Cocker Spaniel breeder in America when he attempted to purchase Obo from Farrow in England. He was turned down, but managed to purchase Chloe II, a successful female Cocker Spaniel show dog and had her mated to Obo prior to her being shipped to the United States.

From Chloe II's litter came two males, Obo and Black Silk, and a female named Black Gem. Black Gem would die from distemper after returning from winning the Produce Stake at a New York show. Obo was shown for the first time at Manchester, New Hampshire in September 1883, where he placed first. He would go on to have further wins at Lowell, New Haven, Connecticut and New York City. Obo II's trophy for Best Cocker Spaniel from the New Haven Kennel Club show in 1884 was gifted to the American Spaniel Club in 2004. Obo's American Kennel Club number was 4911.

His puppies were also highly successful, winning puppy prizes at Lowell, first and second at New York and the top three puppy places at New Haven. Four of his best known offspring are Red Brucie, Sandspring Surmise, Midcliff Miracle Man and Limestone Laddie. In addition, Obo II was the sire of the first dark red Cocker Spaniel in America, Little Miss Rover.

== Death and legacy ==
Modern writers consider Obo to be the father of the modern American Cocker Spaniel. He was different from the modern breed, being 10 inches (25 cm) tall with a long body.

Obo died on January 2, 1895, and was buried on the property of his owner in Salmon Falls village in Rollinsford. Today, the grave is located behind the Rollinsford Grade School in the town of Rollinsford. At the request of the American Spaniel Club, the grave site was registered with the Rollinsford Historical Society as a historical monument.

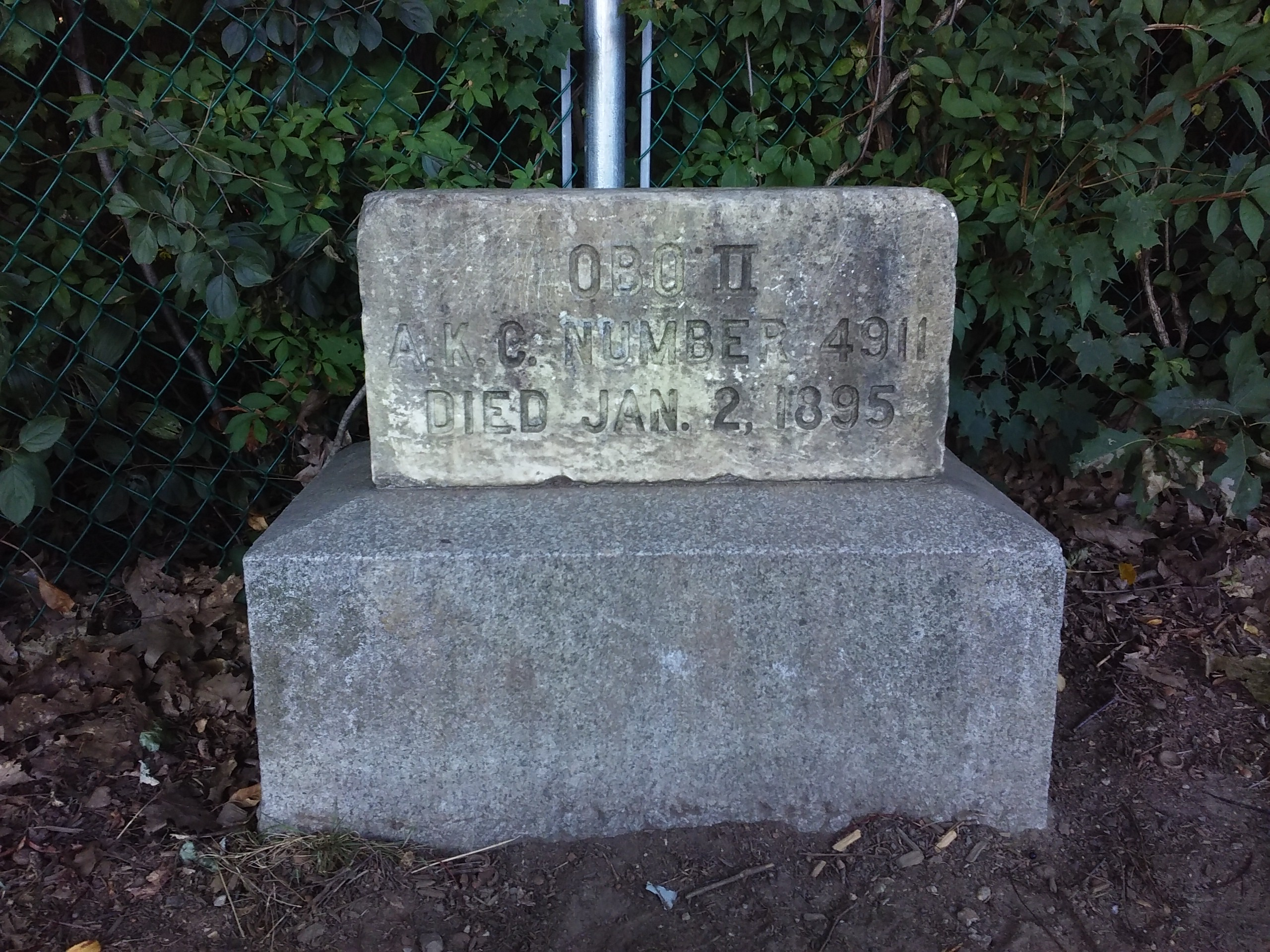
Grave marker of Obo II.

The gravestone is listed to the National Register of Historic Places as a contributing resource to Rollinsford Grade School.

Obo was the first American example of the Obo type which was recognisable on both sides of the Atlantic in many dogs with the prefix "Obo" or "Omo". H. S. Lloyd in the 1939 edition of The Popular Cocker Spaniel pointed out that compared to the Cocker Spaniel breed of the 1930s the Obo type was low to the ground and a "trifle full in eye".

== See also ==
- List of individual dogs
