= Everett Arena =

Indoor arena in Concord, New Hampshire

Coordinates: 43°12′34″N 71°31′37″W

Douglas N. Everett Arena
- The Everett
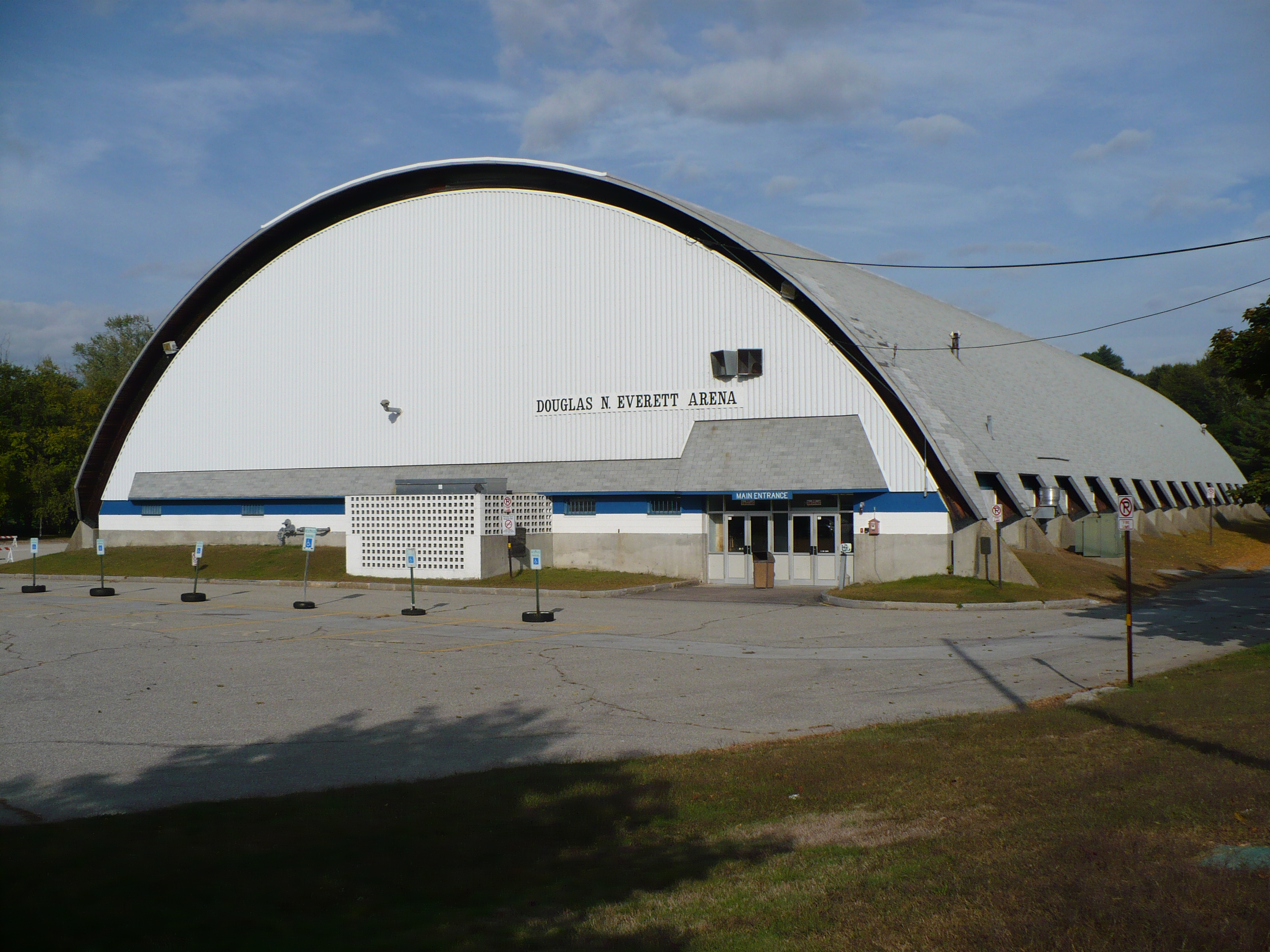
- The arena as it appeared in 2007
- Interactive map of Douglas N. Everett Arena
- Address: 15 Loudon Road; Concord, New Hampshire; United States
- Owner: City of Concord General Services Department

Construction
- Opened: 1965
- Years active: 1965–present
- Architect: Koehler & Isaak

Website
- Webpage on the official Concord, NH website

The Douglas N. Everett Arena is an indoor arena in Concord, New Hampshire, United States. It hosted the Northeastern Hockey League's New Hampshire Freedoms in 1979. The arena holds 1,341 people for hockey.

The arena is owned by the City of Concord and operated by the city's General Services Department. The arena was built in 1965 to designs by Manchester architects Koehler & Isaak. Operations were taken over by the City in the mid 1980s.

From mid-September to mid-March the arena holds ice skating activities such as public skating, stick practice, and hockey games. From mid-March to mid-September the arena hosts shows and events. Roller skating is offered June-July.

== Hockey ==
Competitive A-level men's hockey plays on Monday and Tuesday evenings, while B-level men's hockey play on Sunday evenings and Tuesday and Wednesday mornings. For women's hockey, the Nor'easters play Fridays, and the Helicats play Wednesdays. Leagues are run by independent groups.

The Everett Arena hosts five high school hockey teams. On average, teams typically play 10 home games at the arena during the winter season in addition to playoff games at the end of February and the beginning of March. The Everett Arena also hosts the NHIAA Semi-Final Tournaments for both the girls' and boys' divisions.

The Concord Youth Hockey Association (CYHA) runs youth hockey at the Everett Arena. CYHA offers learn-to-play hockey programs and travel programs for children ages 4 to 18. Programs run from September to March.

== Spring and summer shows ==
When the arena is not an ice rink, dry floor shows and events occur during the spring and summer. The arena is located just east of Interstate 93 at Exit 14. There are 18,000 square feet (1,700 m^{2}) of exhibit space with a 12-by-12-foot (3.7 m × 3.7 m) load-in door and 45-foot-high (14 m) ceilings. Power and water are available on site for exhibitors. A variety of shows and events are hosted at the arena, including book shows, craft fairs, flea markets, gun shows, home shows, Model Train Shows and the Kiwanis Spring Fair.
