= OBOE =

An oboe is a musical instrument of the woodwind family.

Oboe or OBOE may also refer to:

- Oboe (navigation), a World War II British aerial blind bombing targeting system
- Operation Oboe, 1945 Allied campaign in Borneo
- Off-by-one error (OBOE), a type of computer programming or mathematical error
