= Cocker Spaniel =

Dog type

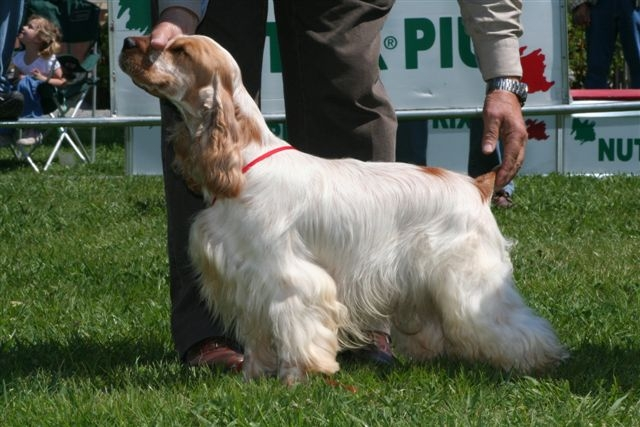
- An orange roan English Cocker Spaniel with docked tail at a conformation show.
- Other names: Cocker
- Origin: England
Traits
- Height: American Cocker Spaniel: 13.5–15.5 in (34–39 cm); English Cocker Spaniel: 15–17 in (38–43 cm)
- Weight: American Cocker Spaniel: 20–30 lb (9–14 kg); English Cocker Spaniel: 26–34 lb (12–15 kg)
- Coat: Medium to long, silky
- Color: Black, liver, red, golden, buff, parti-colour, roan, and other recognized combinations
- Notes: Today, the term Cocker Spaniel collectively refers to two distinct breeds: the American Cocker Spaniel and the English Cocker Spaniel.

Cocker Spaniels are dogs belonging to two breeds of the spaniel dog type: the American Cocker Spaniel and the English Cocker Spaniel. Both are commonly called Cocker Spaniel in their countries of origin. In the early 20th century, Cocker Spaniels also included small hunting spaniels.

Cocker Spaniels were originally bred as hunting dogs in the UK, with the term "cocker" deriving from their use to hunt the Eurasian woodcock. When the breed was brought to the United States, it was bred to specialize in hunting the American woodcock. Further physical changes were bred into the cocker in the United States during the early part of the 20th century.

Spaniels were first mentioned in the 14th century by Gaston III, Count of Foix in his work, Livre de Chasse. The "cocking" or "cocker spaniel" was a type of field or land spaniel in the 19th century. Prior to 1901, Cocker Spaniels were only separated from Field Spaniels and Springer Spaniels by weight. Two dogs are considered to be the foundation sires of both modern breeds. The English variety are descended from Ch. Obo, while the American breed descends from Obo's son, Ch. Obo II. In the United States, the English Cocker was recognized as separate from the native breed in 1946; in the UK, the American type was recognized as a separate breed in 1970. In addition, a second strain of English Cocker Spaniel, a working strain, is not bred to a standard, but to working ability. Both breeds share similar coat colors and health issues with a few exceptions.

== History ==
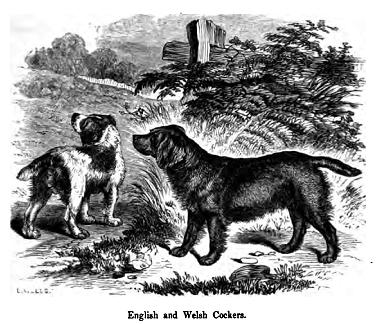
A drawing of English and Welsh Cockers, from John Henry Walsh's (under the pseudonym "Stonehenge") 1859 work The Dog in Health and Disease

While their origins are unknown, "spaynels" are mentioned in 14th-century writings. They are commonly assumed to have originated in Spain, and Edward, 2nd Duke of York in his 15th-century work The Master of Game introduces them as "Another kind of hound there is that be called hounds for the hawk and spaniels, for their kind cometh from Spain, notwithstanding that there are many in other countries." The Master of Game was mostly an English translation of an earlier 14th-century Old French work by Gaston III of Foix-Béarn entitled Livre de Chasse.

In 1801, Sydenham Edwards wrote in Cynographia Britannica that the "Land Spaniel" is divided into two types: the hawking, springing/springer and the cocking/cocker spaniel. The term "cocker" came from the dog's use in hunting woodcocks. During the 19th century, a "cocker spaniel" was a type of small Field Spaniel; at the time, this term referred to a number of different spaniel hunting breeds, including the Norfolk Spaniel, Sussex Spaniel, and Clumber Spaniel. While no Sussex Cockers or Clumber Cockers existed, some dogs were known as "Welsh Cockers" and "Devonshire Cockers". The Welsh or Devonshire were considered cockers until 1903, when they were recognized by The Kennel Club as the Welsh Springer Spaniel.

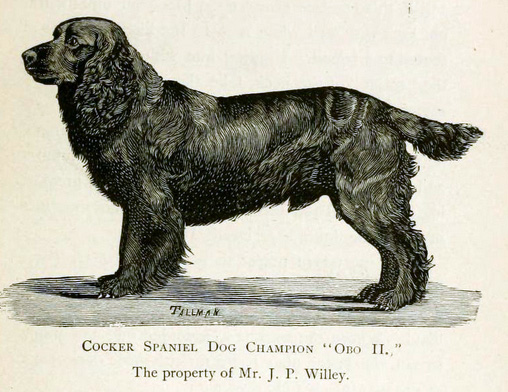
Champion American Cocker Spaniel Ch. Obo II

Prior to the 1870s, the only requirement for a dog to be classed as a Cocker Spaniel was that it needed to weigh less than 25 pounds (11 kg), although breeders separated the cocker from the King Charles Spaniel, which remains a smaller breed of spaniel. This maximum weight limit remained on the Cocker Spaniel until 1900; larger dogs were then classed as Springer Spaniels. The colors of the Devonshire and Welsh Cockers were described by John Henry Walsh under the pseudonym Stonehenge in his book The Dog in Health and Disease as being a deeper shade of liver than that of the Sussex Spaniel. Following the formation of The Kennel Club in the UK in 1873, efforts were made by breeders to record the pedigrees of cockers and springers. In 1892, English Cocker Spaniels and English Springer Spaniels were recognized as separate breeds by The Kennel Club.

Two dogs are considered the foundation sires of both modern breeds of cocker spaniels. Ch. Obo is considered by breed enthusiasts to be the father of the modern English Cocker Spaniel, while his son, Ch. Obo II, is considered to be the progenitor of the American Cocker Spaniel. Obo was born in 1879, when registration as a cocker was still only by size and not by ancestry. He was the son of a Sussex Spaniel and a Field Spaniel. Although Obo was an English dog, Obo II was born on American shores – his mother was shipped to the United States while pregnant. During his lifetime, Obo II was claimed in advertisements to be the sire or grandsire of nearly every prize-winning cocker in America.

== Modern breeds ==
A graph showing the height and shape difference between the English and American Cocker Spaniel

The two breeds of Cocker Spaniel are the English Cocker Spaniel and the American Cocker Spaniel. They were bred as gun dogs, to use their sense of smell to cover low areas near the handler to flush birds into the air to be shot, and to use their eyes and nose to locate the bird once downed, and then to retrieve the bird with a soft mouth. The major difference between the English and American varieties is that the American is smaller with a shorter back, a domed head, and a shorter muzzle, while the English variety is taller with a narrower head and chest.

Cocker Spaniel coats occur in a variety of colors, including black, liver, red, and golden in solids. Also, black and tan, and sometimes liver and tan are known, as well as a variety of color mixtures of those solid colors including roans, roan and tans, tricolors, and those solid colors with additional white markings.

Rare colors can appear unexpectedly in certain lines, for instance while an all-white cocker is usually bred by selective breeding of very light golden strains, they can still appear very uncommonly to parents that are dark-colored. A noted occurrence of this happened in 1943, when a grandson of My Own Brucie, Best in Show at the Westminster Kennel Club Dog Show in 1940 and 1941, was born all-white.

In 2009, the American Cocker Spaniel was ranked the 23rd-most popular breed in the United States according to AKC registration statistics, a decrease in popularity since 1999, when it was ranked 13th. For 25 years, the American Cocker Spaniel was the most popular dog in America. It was ranked number one first in 1936 prior to the English Cocker Spaniel being recognized as a separate breed, and held onto the spot until 1952, when Beagles became the most popular dogs. It regained the spot in 1983 and held on at number one until 1990. In the UK, the American Cocker Spaniel is far less popular than its English relative, with 322 registrations compared to the English Cocker's 22,211 in 2009.

=== English Cocker Spaniel ===
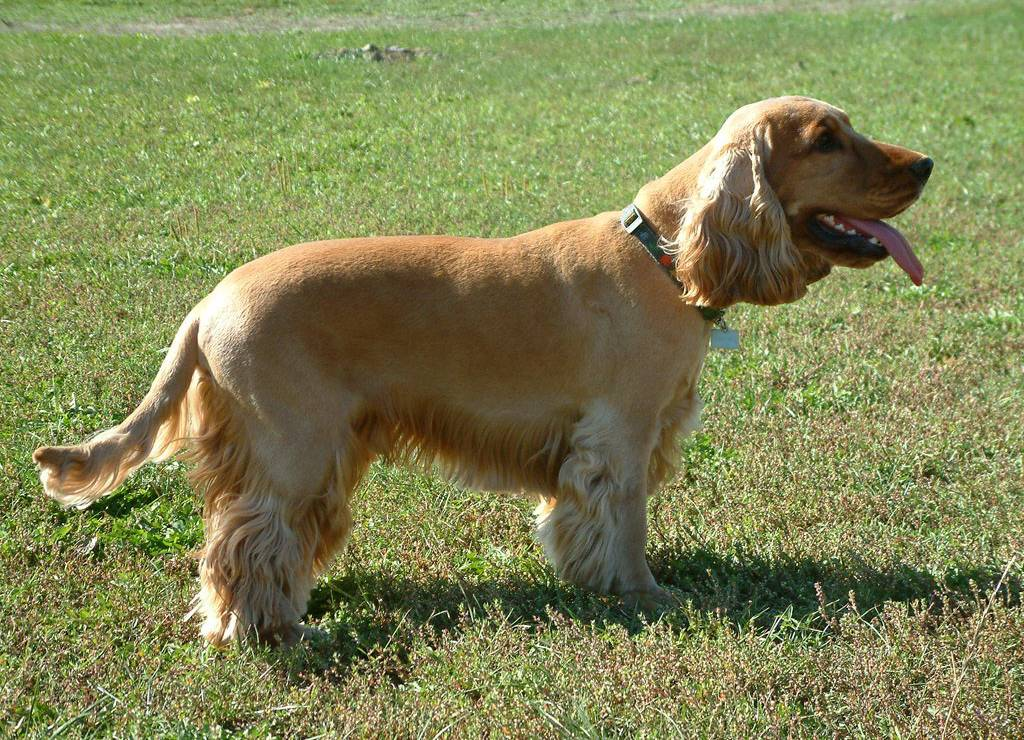
A golden English Cocker Spaniel of the show strain

Called simply Cocker Spaniel in the UK, the breed was first recognized by The Kennel Club (KC) in 1892. The American Kennel Club (AKC) recognized the English Cocker Spaniel as a separate breed in 1946.

The size of the English Cocker Spaniel according to the KC is 15.5–16.0 inches (39–41 cm) at the withers for males, and 15.0–15.5 inches (38–39 cm) for females. The weight of a show dog should be 28–32 pounds (13–15 kg).

The English Cocker Spaniel is the most popular dog breed for showing in the UK, Crufts, with several best-in-show titles since the prize was first awarded in 1928. This was mostly due to the success of dog breeder H.S. Lloyd's Ware Kennel, whose dogs won best-in-show on six occasions between 1930–1950. They are the second most popular dog breed in the UK according to statistics released by the KC with 22,211 registrations in 2009, beaten only by the Labrador Retriever with 40,943. In third place was the English Springer Spaniel with 12,700. The English Cocker's popularity has increased steadily since 1999 in the United States when they were ranked 76th in registrations by the AKC, to 2009 when they were ranked 66th.

==== Physical differences between show and working strains ====
In the United Kingdom, two distinct strains of the English Cocker Spaniel have developed: the show (or conformation) strain and the working (or field) strain. While both strains share the same breed ancestry, selective breeding for different purposes has resulted in notable physical and behavioral differences.

Show Cockers are bred to meet the breed standard established by kennel clubs, focusing on appearance and structure ideal for dog shows. These dogs typically have more domed skulls, longer and more luxuriant ears, and a thicker, silkier coat with prominent feathering on the legs, chest, and tail.

In contrast, working Cockers are bred primarily for field performance and hunting ability, particularly for flushing and retrieving game birds. As a result, they are often slightly taller and leaner, with flatter skulls, shorter ears, and shorter, finer coats that require less maintenance. Their feathering is minimal, reducing the risk of debris getting caught during field work. Additionally, working Cockers tend to have higher stamina, quicker reflexes, and a more intense drive to work, which makes them highly suitable for active environments or gundog roles. Their high energy levels and focus can make them more demanding as household pets without proper training and mental stimulation.

Despite these differences, both strains remain part of the same breed and share many of the friendly and affectionate traits characteristic of English Cocker Spaniels.

=== American Cocker Spaniel ===
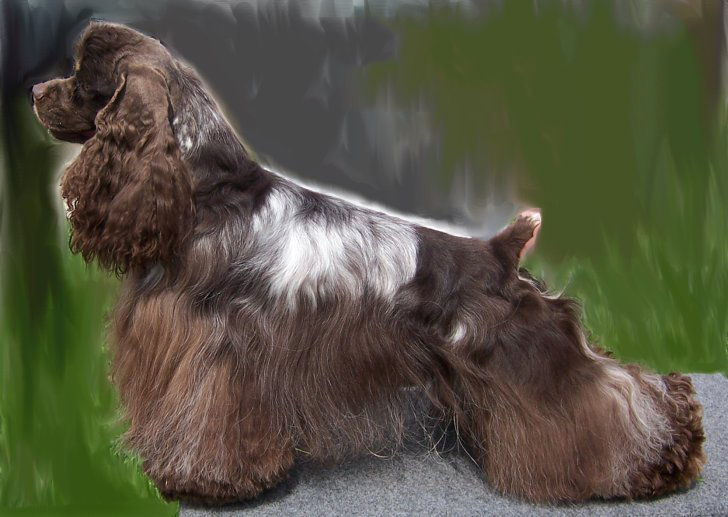
A recently groomed American Cocker Spaniel

American Cocker Spaniels were recognized by the AKC in 1878. Generally smaller than the English, separate classes were created for the two types in America in 1935 and the Cocker Spaniel Club of America discouraged breeding between the two types in 1938. The American Cocker Spaniel was recognized as a separate breed by the KC in the UK in 1970. The American Cocker Spaniel is referred to as the Cocker Spaniel within the United States.

The American Cocker Spaniel was bred smaller, as American woodcocks are smaller than their European relatives, and the breed's appearance changed slightly during the first part of the 20th century, as the preference by American breeders was for a more stylish appearance. The standard size according to the AKC is between 14.5 and 15.5 inches (37 and 39 cm) at the withers for males and 13.5–14.5 inches (34–37 cm) for females. The weight of the breed is typically between 24 and 30 pounds (11 and 14 kg).

At the Westminster Kennel Club Dog Show, the most prestigious dog show in the United States, the American Cocker Spaniel has won Best in Show on four occasions since its first award in 1907. The American Cocker Spaniel is judged in three separate breed classes under AKC rules; "black", "parti-color", and "any solid color other than black..." (ASCOB).

== See also ==
- List of dog breeds
