= Alexander John Majeski =

American architect

- Born: August 29, 1920; Waterbury, Connecticut
- Died: March 10, 1974
- Occupation: Architect
- Known for: Principal in Alexander J. Majeski

Alexander John Majeski, AIA, (August 29, 1920 – March 10, 1974), was an American architect who practiced in the mid to late-twentieth-century Connecticut, New York, New Jersey, and Pennsylvania.

== Personal life ==
Born on August 29, 1920, in Waterbury, Connecticut, he earned his Bachelor of Architecture from the Pratt Institute in 1943. He served in the United States Navy as a Lieutenant from 1943 to 1946. In 1970, he lived at 812 Olive Street, 794, St. Louis, Missouri 63101. He died March 10, 1974.

== Architectural career ==
Majeski joined the New Hampshire Chapter of the American Institute of Architects in 1947, for which he served as its president in 1966 and 1967. He was registered to practice in Connecticut and New Hampshire. He practiced under his own name, Alexander J. Majeski in 1954 and practiced out of 23 Palomino Lane, Bedford, New Hampshire 03102. He was an inspector for the Federal Housing Administration in Manchester, New Hampshire, from 1948 to 1951 and member of the New Hampshire Planning & Develop Committee from 1952 to 1954.

== Works ==
- 1963: Goffstown High School (Goffstown, New Hampshire)
- 1965: Blessed Elizabeth Seton Church, now St. Elizabeth Seton's Church (Bedford, New Hampshire)
- 1967: New Hampshire Supply (Manchester, New Hampshire)
- 1968: Henschel Shoe Company (Littleton, New Hampshire)
- 1969: Goffstown Fire Station (Goffstown, New Hampshire)
