= Rollinsford, New Hampshire =

- Town
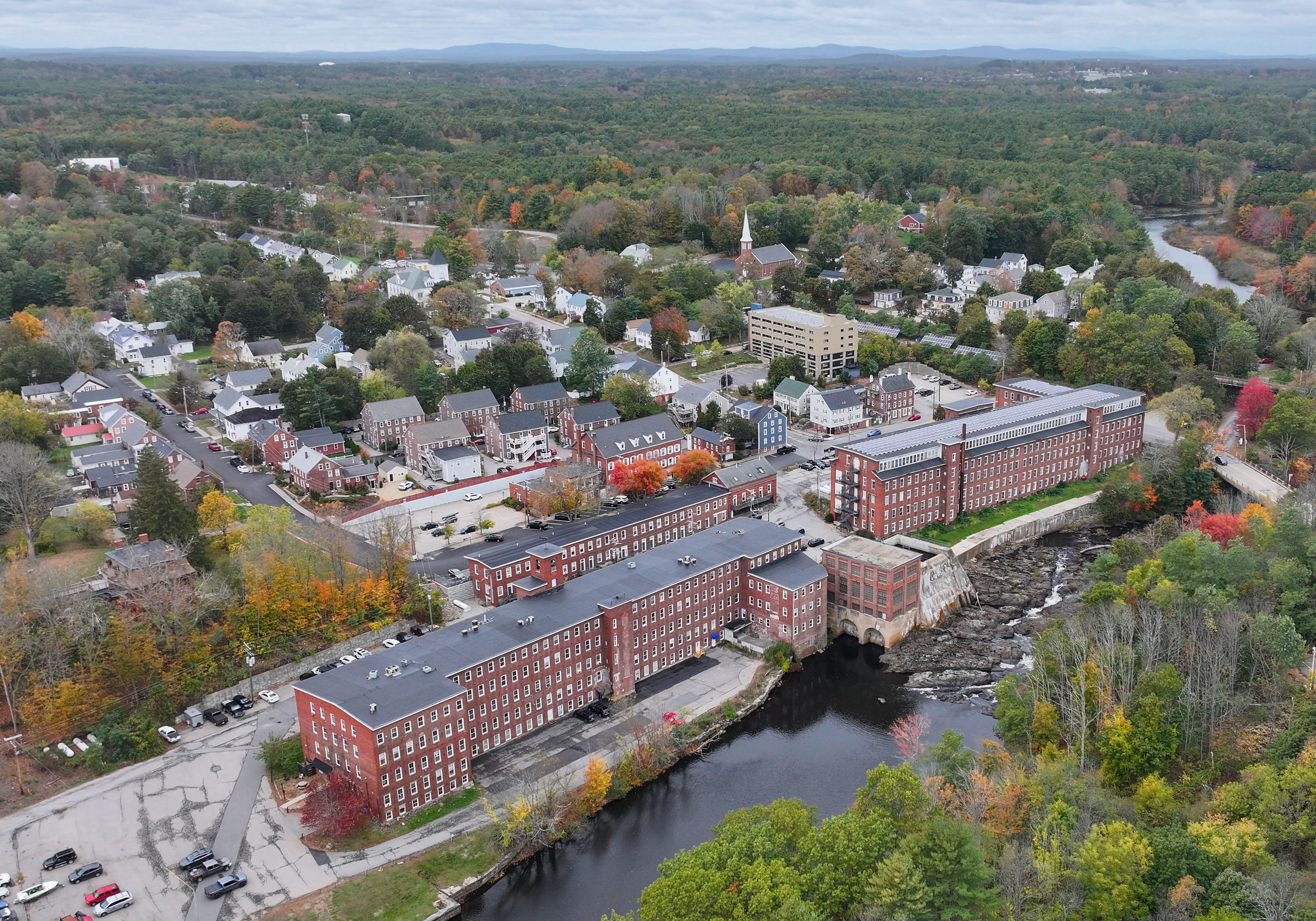
- Aerial view, 2025

- Seal

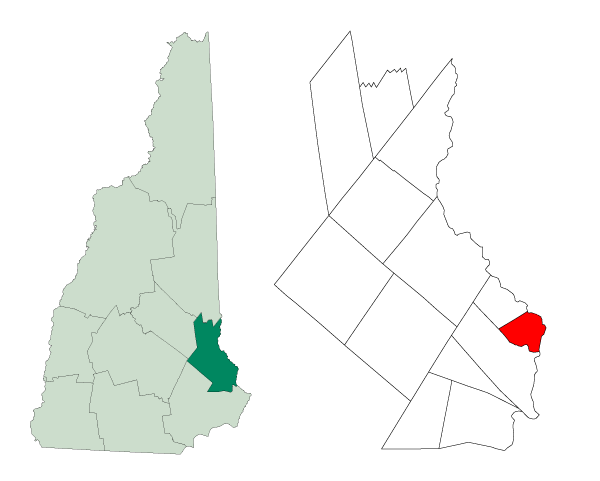
- Location within Strafford County, New Hampshire
- Coordinates: 43°13′15″N 70°50′33″W
- Country: United States
- State: New Hampshire
- County: Strafford
- Settled: 1630s
- Incorporated: 1849

Area
  - Total: 7.6 sq mi (19.6 km^{2})
  - Land: 7.3 sq mi (18.9 km^{2})
  - Water: 0.27 sq mi (0.7 km^{2})
- Elevation: 125 ft (38 m)

Population (2020)
  - Total: 2,597
  - Density: 356/sq mi (137.6/km^{2})
- Time zone: UTC-5 (EST)
  - Summer (DST): UTC-4 (EDT)
- ZIP code: 03869
- Area code: 603
- FIPS code: 33-65540
- GNIS feature ID: 873709
- Website: www.rollinsford.nh.us

Rollinsford is a town in Strafford County, New Hampshire, United States. The population was 2,597 at the 2020 census. The main village in town was once known as "Salmon Falls Village".

== History ==
The area was once within the domain of the Newichawannock people, an Abenaki sub-tribe which took its name from the Newichawannock River, meaning "river with many falls", now the Salmon Falls River. Their village was located at what later was known as Salmon Falls Village and is now Rollinsford. They fished at the falls, stretching nets across the river to catch migrating salmon and other species swimming upriver to spawn. But war and disease, probably smallpox brought from abroad, decimated the native population.

Subsequently, settled by about 1630, the land was part of Dover, one of the original townships of New Hampshire. The area was first called "Sligo", likely after County Sligo in Ireland, and the name survives on a town road. An historical marker on Sligo Road reads, "Near this place lived David Hamilton of Westburn born in the parish of Cambuslang, Scotland in October 1620; captured by Oliver Cromwell at the Battle of Worcester, England, September 3, 1651; Brought to America as a prisoner in chains on the "John and Sarah" in the same year; settled near here and married Annah Jaxson of Lanark, Scotland. Killed by Indians on September 28, 1691." His death occurred during King William's War in which New France encouraged its Indian allies to attack English settlements.

In 1729 the area was established as a parish called "Summersworth", meaning summer town, because the ministers preached here during the summer. In 1754, it was set off and incorporated as a town by colonial governor Benning Wentworth, although thereafter spelled "Somersworth" due to a clerical error. Since the first settlers' arrival, small communities had developed near various sawmills and gristmills along the Salmon Falls River, but the center of "Summersworth" was located at Rollinsford Junction.

Beginning in the early 1820s, water powered textile mills were established at the larger falls, and the town was divided between them—Great Falls became Somersworth, and Salmon Falls became Rollinsford, incorporated in 1849. It was named in honor of the Rollins family, whose ancestor Judge Ichabod Rollins had settled there many generations before and had become the first probate judge for the state.

=== Salmon Falls Village ===
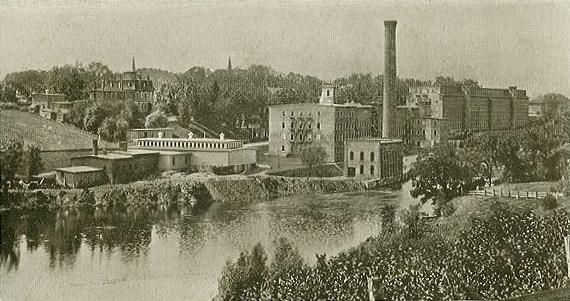
Salmon Falls Mfg. Co. in 1906

The village of Salmon Falls was founded in 1823 by a group of local investors led by James Rundlet of Portsmouth, who on June 17, 1822, incorporated the Salmon Falls Manufacturing Company to manufacture woolen cloth using the power of the Salmon Falls River, a Piscataqua River tributary. After an 1834 fire destroyed the first factory built there, the company's Portsmouth-based investors built a new factory for cotton manufacturing, eventually selling the corporation to their Boston-based cotton broker Mason and Lawrence in the 1840s. As part of their expansion, the town was laid out in an easy-to-navigate grid plan, with the three-story boarding houses and an adjoining mill building made of brick to withstand fires. Two-story brick double houses were also built to accommodate the families of the overseers. The town thrived into the first decades of the 20th century and eventually became home to many immigrant families whose forebears came to work in the mills. Although the town planners originally forbade the mill workers to drink alcohol and required that they attend church on Sunday, during Prohibition, its proximity to temperate Maine and the Boston & Maine Railroad line led to the establishment of numerous bars and a relatively short-lived but racy reputation for free-flowing liquor.

The New England cotton industry would fade in the early to mid-20th century, but would leave the brick town intact. Today, the mills have been reborn as low-cost studio space for more than 100 artists and artisans who use the converted studios for everything from painting, sculpting and crafting handmade furniture to teaching and practicing yoga and dance.

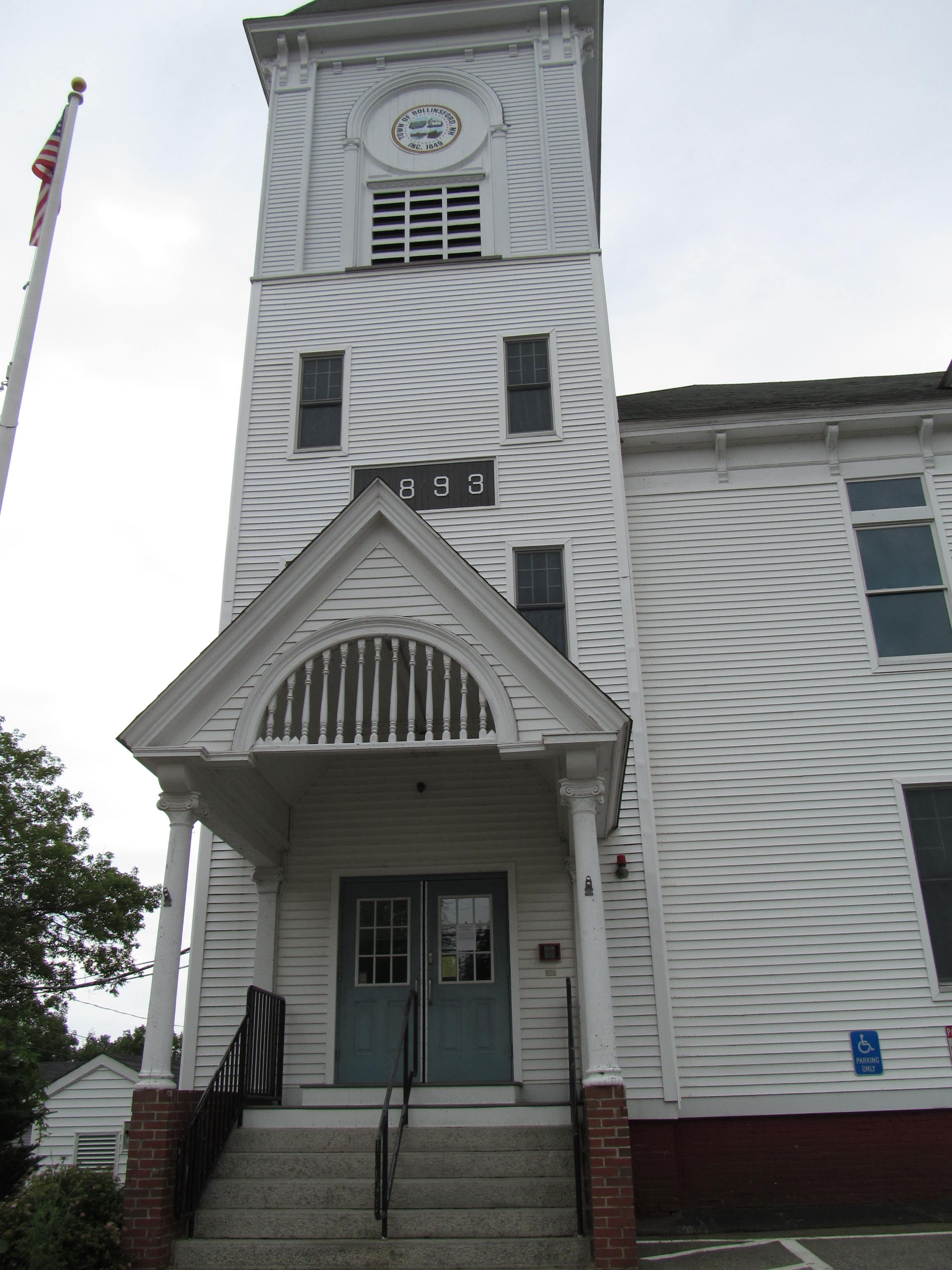
Town Hall

== Geography ==
According to the United States Census Bureau, Rollinsford has a total area of 7.6 square miles (19.6 km^{2}), of which 7.3 square miles (18.9 km^{2}) are land and 0.3 square miles (0.7 km^{2}) are water, comprising 3.71% of the town. The town is bounded on the east by the Salmon Falls River, which serves as the New Hampshire–Maine border. The western half of the town is drained by Rollins and Twombly brooks, which flow south to the Cochecho River in neighboring Dover. The entire town is part of the Piscataqua River watershed. The highest point in town is an unnamed 300-foot (91 m) summit near the border with Somersworth. Garrison Hill, 290 feet (88 m) above sea level, occupies the town's border with Dover to the west.

New Hampshire Route 4 crosses the town, leading southwest to Dover and northeast to South Berwick, Maine, where it becomes Maine State Route 4.

== Demographics ==
Historical population
Census	Pop.	Note	%±
1850	1,862		—
1860	2,069		11.1%
1870	1,500		−27.5%
1880	1,712		14.1%
1890	2,003		17.0%
1900	1,701		−15.1%
1910	1,836		7.9%
1920	1,701		−7.4%
1930	1,409		−17.2%
1940	1,463		3.8%
1950	1,652		12.9%
1960	1,935		17.1%
1970	2,273		17.5%
1980	2,319		2.0%
1990	2,645		14.1%
2000	2,648		0.1%
2010	2,527		−4.6%
2020	2,597		2.8%
U.S. Decennial Census

Rollinsford Fire Department

As of the census of 2000, there were 2,648 people, 1,033 households, and 721 families residing in the town. The population density was 363.0 inhabitants per square mile (140.2/km^{2}). There were 1,060 housing units at an average density of 145.3 per square mile (56.1/km^{2}). The racial makeup of the town was 97.77% White, 0.68% African American, 0.08% Native American, 0.53% Asian, 0.08% from other races, and 0.87% from two or more races. Hispanic or Latino of any race were 0.60% of the population.

There were 1,033 households, out of which 34.1% had children under the age of 18 living with them, 58.4% were married couples living together, 7.6% had a female householder with no husband present, and 30.2% were non-families. 22.3% of all households were made up of individuals, and 8.4% had someone living alone who was 65 years of age or older. The average household size was 2.56 and the average family size was 3.03.

In the town, the population was spread out, with 25.2% under the age of 18, 6.9% from 18 to 24, 33.0% from 25 to 44, 22.5% from 45 to 64, and 12.3% who were 65 years of age or older. The median age was 37 years. For every 100 females, there were 97.8 males. For every 100 females age 18 and over, there were 95.1 males.

The median income for a household in the town was $48,588, and the median income for a family was $60,625. Males had a median income of $37,750 versus $26,068 for females. The per capita income for the town was $24,444. About 2.6% of families and 3.7% of the population were below the poverty line, including 5.2% of those under age 18 and 3.4% of those age 65 or over.

== Notable people ==
- George G. Adams (1850–1932), architect
- Dave Guard (1934–1991), folk singer with The Kingston Trio
- Dan Marsh (born 1956) a.k.a. "Dangerous" Danny Davis, referee-turned-wrestler
- Edith A. Roberts (1881–1977), plant physiologist; born in Rollinsford
- Virginia Huntington Robie (1868–1957), author and academic
- Edward H. Rollins (1824–1889), state senator, US congressman
- Bill Staines (1947–2021), folk singer-songwriter

== See also ==
- Salmon Falls Mill Historic District
- Rollinsford Town Hall
- Rollinsford Grade School
