= Portsmouth Downtown Historic District =

Historic district in New Hampshire, United States

- U.S. National Register of Historic Places
- U.S. Historic district
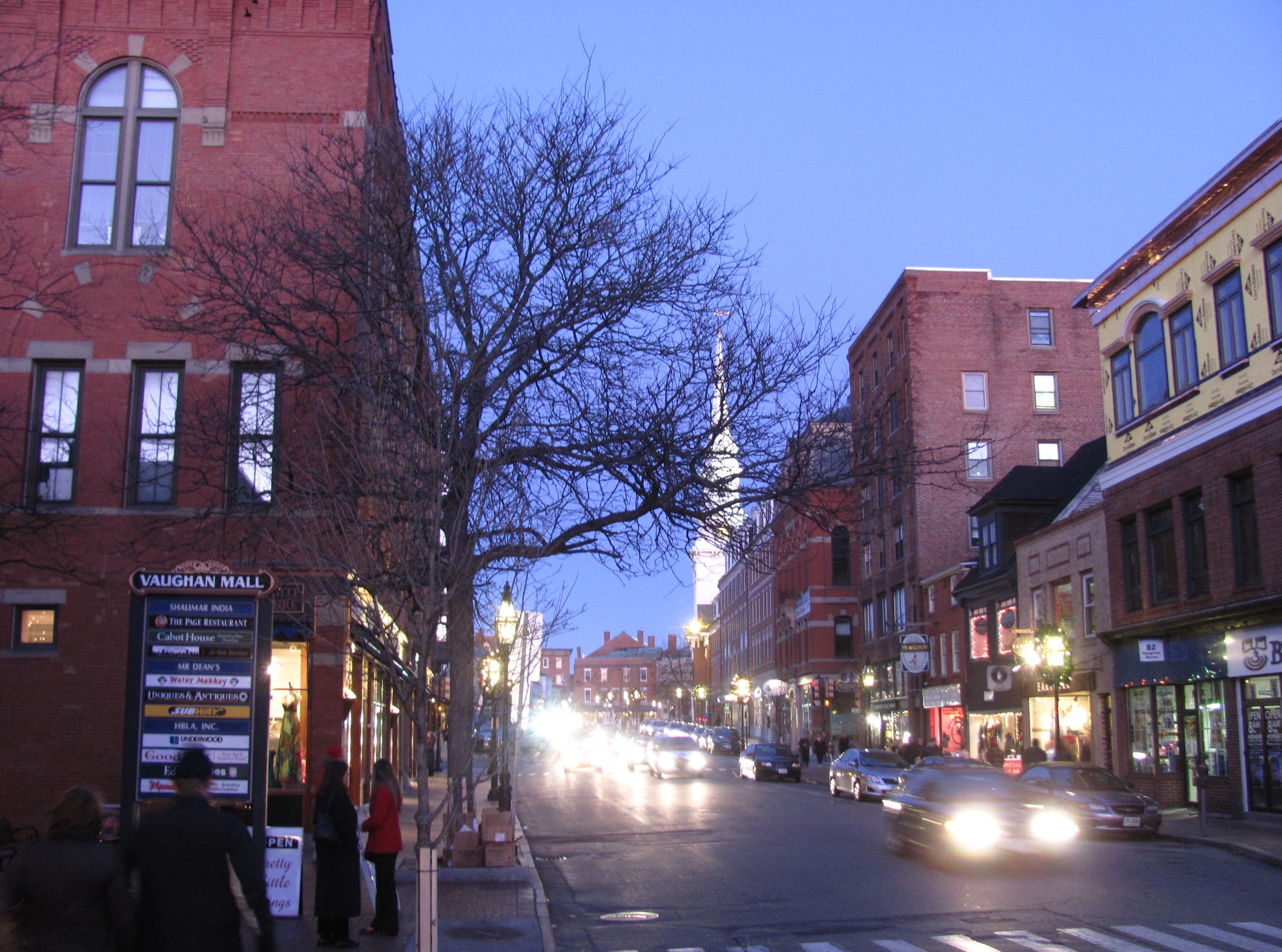
- Congress Street

- Location within New Hampshire Location within the United States
- Location: Downtown and adjacent residential areas, Portsmouth, New Hampshire
- Coordinates: 43°4′37″N 70°45′27″W
- Area: 33.6 acres (13.6 ha)
- Architectural style: Greek Revival, Late Victorian, Federal
- NRHP reference No.: 16000820
- Added to NRHP: June 19, 2017

The Portsmouth Downtown Historic District encompasses the historic urban core of Portsmouth, New Hampshire. With a history dating to the 17th century, Portsmouth was New Hampshire's principal seaport and the center of its economy for many decades, and the architecture of its urban center is reflective of nearly four centuries of history. The district is roughly L-shaped, radiating from the downtown Market Square area to South Street in the south and Madison and Columbia streets in the west, with more than 1,200 historically significant buildings. It was listed on the National Register of Historic Places in 2017. The district includes 35 previous listings on the National Register, and five National Historic Landmarks.

== Description and history ==
Portsmouth is located at the northern end of New Hampshire's short seacoast, and is bounded on the north by the Piscataqua River and on the east by the island community of New Castle. Its downtown area is roughly bounded on the north and south by mill ponds, and is where the town was first settled in 1630. It was formally incorporated in 1653, and developed as New Hampshire's major port. Its early economy was dominated by the lumber trade, primarily ship masts that were sent to Great Britain for use in its shipbuilding trade. Merchant trade to other parts of the Atlantic, including the slave trade, fostered further growth, and it remained a prominent port of the United States until the War of 1812. The war brought a flourish of privateering income, but after the war, trade that had been cut off was not resumed at the same level. The Portsmouth Naval Shipyard (located on an island in the Piscataqua that is in neighboring Kittery, Maine) became an economic mainstay in the 19th century and early 20th centuries.

The historic district encompasses a wealth of resources associated with the economic, political, and social history of the city. It includes fine colonial-era and Federal-era residences associated with prominent local politicians and businessmen, commercial buildings spanning more than 200 years of history, and reminders of the city's importance as a maritime center. Its commercial heart extends from the northern and eastern waterfront westward to Maplewood Avenue, with period residential development extending westward nearly to Cass Street. To the south, Strawbery Banke, a living open-air history museum, preserves a portion of the city's old waterfront, and Prescott Park represents an urban renewal endeavour providing access to the waterfront area. Densely built residential areas are found between Strawbery Banke and the South Mill Pond, on whose banks stands the Portsmouth Cottage Hospital, one of the city's oldest hospital buildings.

== See also ==
- National Register of Historic Places listings in Rockingham County, New Hampshire
