= Fremont Meeting House =

Historic church in New Hampshire, United States

- U.S. National Register of Historic Places
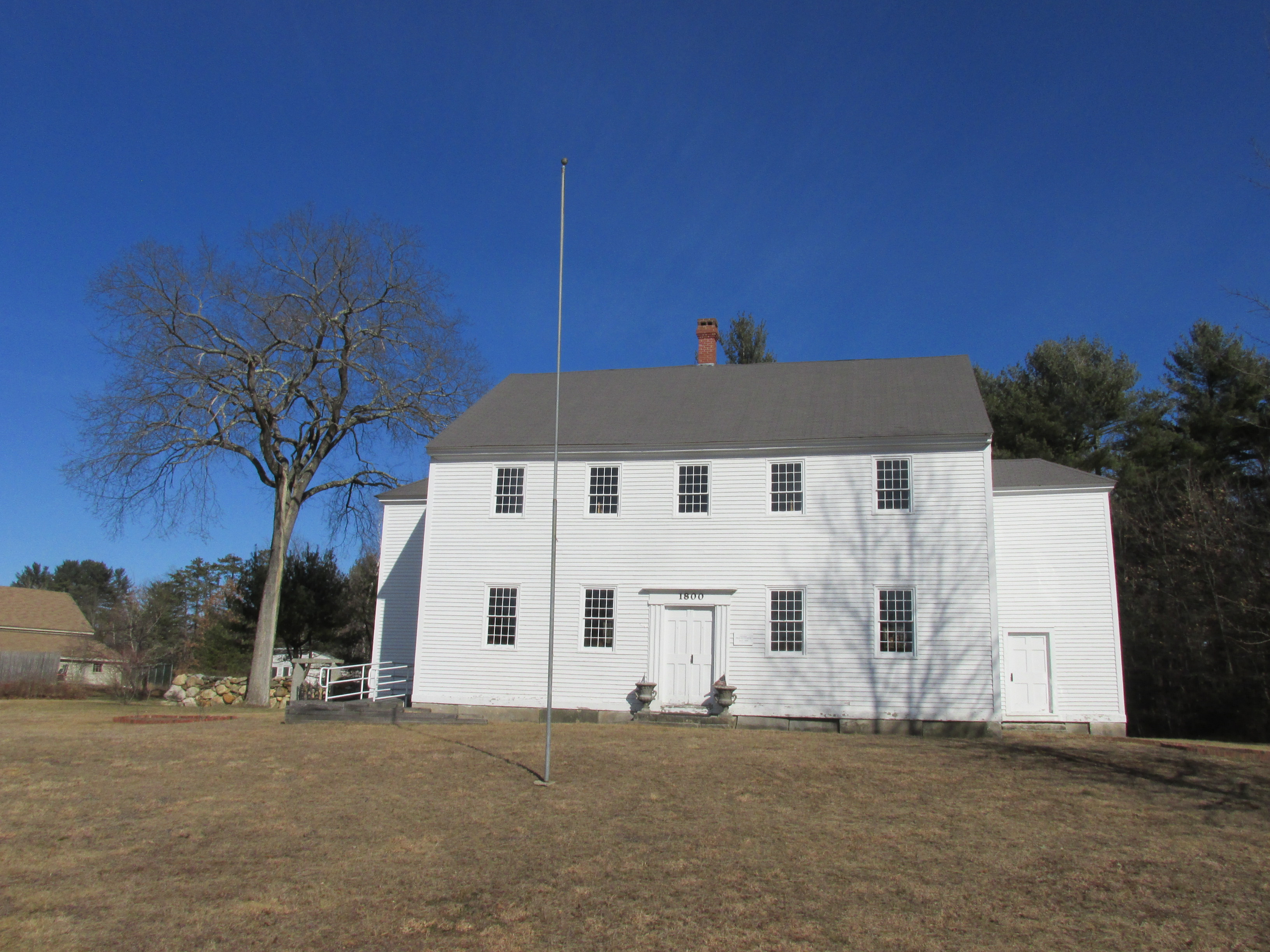
- Fremont Meeting House

- Location within New Hampshire Location within the United States
- Location: 464 Main St., Fremont, New Hampshire
- Coordinates: 42°58′59″N 71°7′44″W
- Area: 0.3 acres (0.12 ha)
- Built: 1800
- Architectural style: Federal
- NRHP reference No.: 93000461
- Added to NRHP: May 27, 1993

The Fremont Meeting House (also known as Poplin Meeting House) is a historic meeting house at 464 Main Street (New Hampshire Route 107) in Fremont, New Hampshire. Built in 1800, it is a well-preserved example of a Federal-period meeting house, and is the only surviving example in the state with two porches, a once-common variant of the building type. The building was listed on the National Register of Historic Places in 1993.

== Description and history ==
The Fremont Meeting House is located near the southern end of the dispersed rural center of Fremont, on the northeast side of NH 107 a short way south of the Ellis School. It is a large two-story wooden structure, measuring 46 ft 6 in (14.17 m) by 36 ft 8 in (11.18 m), with a gabled roof and clapboarded exterior. It has a plain five-bay main facade, its only ornamentation in the centered entrance surround, which has paneled pilasters and a corniced entablature. The short gable ends of the building are extended by staircase enclosures, which provide access to the second-floor gallery space. The interior retains some of its original box pews, and its pulpit, portions of which retain original marbleized paint finish. Other surviving interior elements include some rare period music supports in the gallery. The property also includes a 19th-century hearse house.

The town of Fremont was incorporated as Poplin in 1764, out of Brentwood. It is unusual among area towns that it did not build a meeting house soon afterward, and early congregationalists continued to worship in surrounding towns. This meeting house was built in 1800, and is one of the last in the region to be built in the old style, with the main entrance on the long side and without a steeple. Its construction also exhibits the use of the queenpost truss in the roof, a technique that did not become common until the 19th century. The building served as a town meeting space until a new town hall was built in 1911.

== See also ==
- National Register of Historic Places listings in Rockingham County, New Hampshire
- New Hampshire Historical Marker No. 167: Meetinghouse and Hearse House
