= Elm Farm =

Elm Farm may refer to:

- Elm Farm, Aylesbury, a housing estate in Buckinghamshire, England
- Elm Farm Ollie, the first cow to fly in an airplane
- Elm Farm (Danville, New Hampshire)
