= List of New Hampshire historical markers (151–175) =

- «126–150 176–200»

This page is one of a series of pages that list New Hampshire historical markers. The text of each marker is provided within its entry.

Contents
No.	Title	Location	Coordinates
151	Newington	Newington	43.11528138°N 70.82319036°W
152	Cherry Mountain Slide	Jefferson	44.36037°N 71.48821°W
153	Factory Village	Bennington	43.0003°N 71.92825°W
154	Packer's Falls	Durham	43.11427°N 70.92519°W
155	Chinook Kennels	Tamworth	43.90856°N 71.32765°W
156	John Brown Family – Gunsmiths	Fremont	42.98643°N 71.13294°W
157	Spaulding & Frost Cooperage	Fremont	42.98927°N 71.13895°W
158	Cornish-Windsor Bridge	Cornish	43.47295°N 72.38339°W
159	Boom Piers	Berlin	44.48641362°N 71.16661225°W
160	Haverhill Corner Historic District	Haverhill	44.03432°N 72.06335°W
161	Ladd-Gilman House	Exeter	42.98206°N 70.94908°W
162	New Hill Village	Hill	43.51959°N 71.70227°W
163	Boston, Concord, and Montreal Railroad	Ashland	43.69009°N 71.63346°W
164	Alton Bay Transportation Center	Alton	43.47359°N 71.23784°W
165	The Alexander Scammell Bridge over the Bellamy River	Dover	43.12995°N 70.85277°W
166	Londonderry Town Pound	Londonderry	42.87843°N 71.38088°W
167	Meetinghouse and Hearse House	Fremont	42.98298°N 71.12851°W
168	Gilsum Stone Arch Bridge	Gilsum	43.03931°N 72.27036°W
169	Hawke Meeting House	Danville	42.93712°N 71.11873°W
170	Civil War Riot of 1861	Fremont	42.99073°N 71.14205°W
171	Dixville Notch "First in the Nation"	Dixville Notch	44.86637°N 71.30269°W
172	New Hampshire Veterans' Association	Laconia	43.60739°N 71.45933°W
173	Lake Coos and the Presidential Range	Lancaster	44.46779°N 71.5433°W
174	Loveland Bridge	Rumney	43.83854°N 71.81447°W
175	New Hampshire's Presidential Primary	Concord	43.20723°N 71.53855°W
Notes • References • External links

== Markers 151 to 175 ==
=== 151. Newington ===
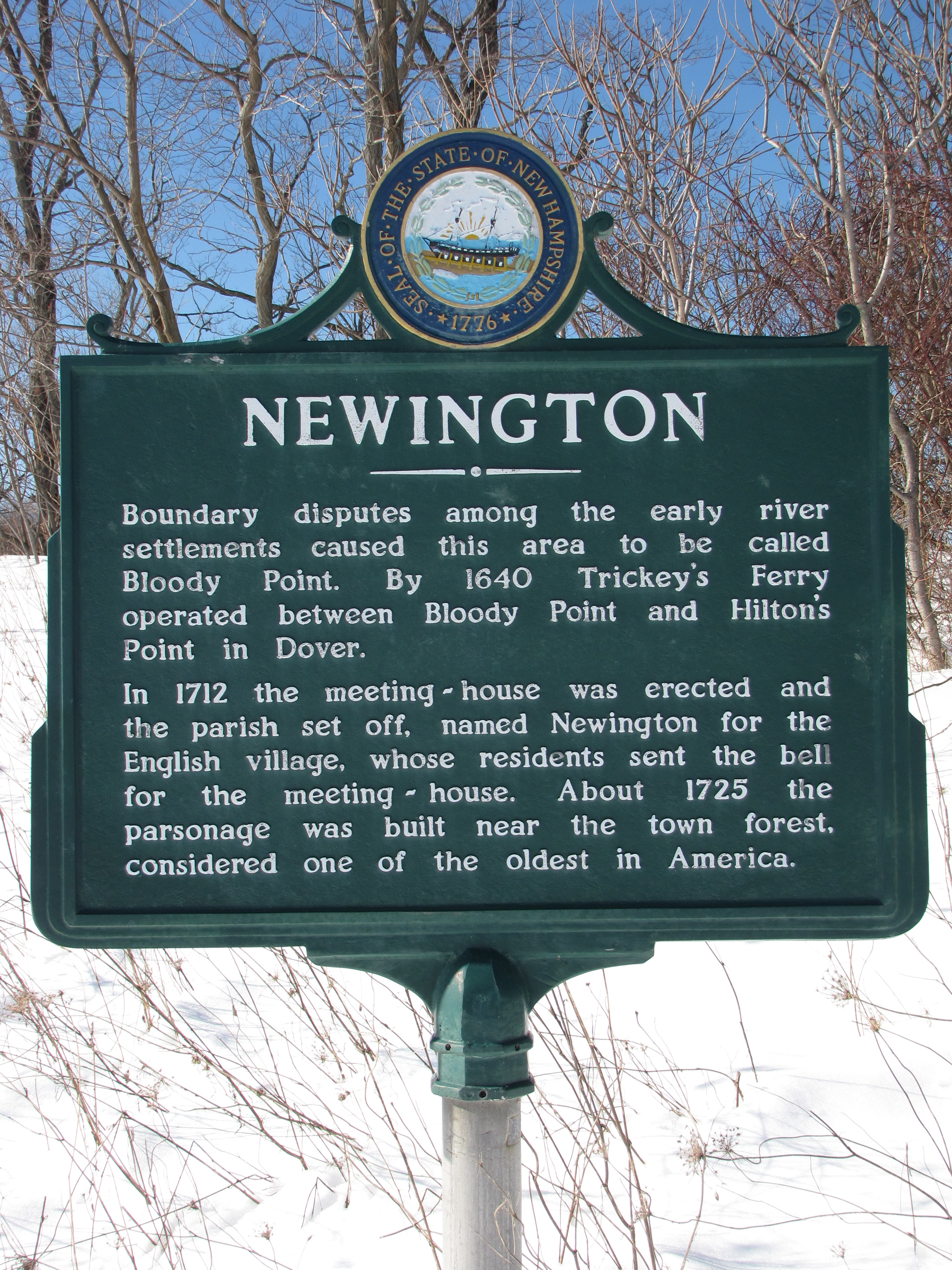
Historical marker 151 in Newington

Town of Newington

"Boundary disputes among the early river settlers caused this area to be called Bloody Point. By 1640 Trickey's Ferry operated between Bloody Point and Hilton's Point in Dover. In 1712 the meeting-house was erected and the parish set off, named Newington for the English village, whose residents sent the bell for the meeting-house. About 1725 the parsonage was built near the town forest, considered one of the oldest in America."

=== 152. Cherry Mountain Slide ===
Town of Jefferson

"On July 10, 1885, at 6 a.m., a slide from Cherry Mountain's northern peak left a deep gash from Owl's Head to the Valley. A million tons of boulders, trees and mud loosed by a cloudburst rolled and tumbled a tortuous two miles, destroying Oscar Stanley's new home and his cattle, barn and crops. Farm hand Don Walker, rescued from debris of the barn, died four days later; but Stanley's family was not there and was spared. Excursion trains and carriages brought people from far and wide to view the tragic sight, which has now almost disappeared through nature's healing process."

Note: this marker was erected in 1985.

=== 153. Factory Village ===
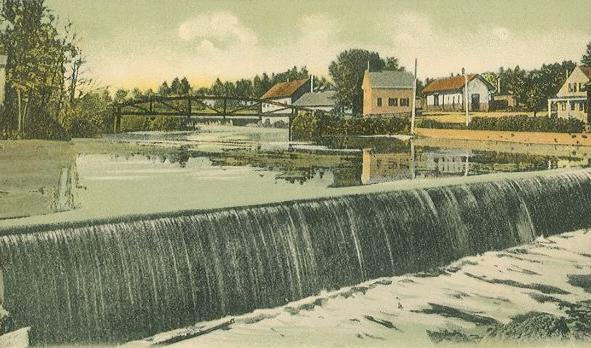
Great Falls in Bennington, c. 1905

Town of Bennington

"Directly east was the 'Great Falls of the Contoocook,' where the river dropped 75 feet in less than a mile. Mills have been located here since 1783. In 1810, one of New England's first cotton mills started here. There has been a paper mill at the site of Monadnock Paper Mills since early in the 19th century. Five dams also powered a cutlery factory, a fulling mill, a powder mill, and a tannery. By the turn of the 20th century, the oldest dam generated electricity for Antrim and Bennington. Now the dams are used by the paper mill for power and flow control."

Note: this marker was erected in 1985.

=== 154. Packer's Falls ===
Town of Durham

"These scenic falls, 1.6 miles west of here on the Lamprey River, once provided waterpower and industry for the early settlers. A deed dated April 11, 1694, shows that Capt. Packer, Jonathan Woodman, James Davis, Joseph Meder, and James Thomas were granted 'the hole streame of Lamprele River for erecting a saw mill or mills.' Thomas Packer of Portsmouth was a merchant, physician, judge, member of the King's Council, and father of the famous Sheriff Thomas Packer."

=== 155. Chinook Kennels ===
Town of Tamworth

"Purchased and moved to this site in 1930 by Milton and Eva B. 'Short' Seeley, these kennels produced sled dogs for exploration, racing, and showing. For almost 50 years Chinook Kennels exerted a profound influence upon the Alaskan Malamute and Siberian Husky breeds, and many champions were born here. With Milton directing, dog teams were sent on the Byrd Antarctic Expeditions and to the Army's Search and Rescue units. After his death in 1943, Eva continued alone. An author, sled dog racer, and dynamic contributor to the sport of dogsledding, 'Short' was named to the Musher's Hall of Fame in Alaska. Mrs. Seeley died in 1985 at age 94."

=== 156. John Brown Family – Gunsmiths ===
Town of Fremont

"Around 1845 John Brown of Poplin, now Fremont, built this gun shop, and with sons Andrew & Freeman spent 62 years producing fine target and hunting rifles, shotguns, and pistols. During the Civil War these prominent gunsmiths made firearms for the U.S. Government, and in 1861 their gun shop served as a recruiting office for enlisting Union sharpshooters."

=== 157. Spaulding & Frost Cooperage ===
Town of Fremont

"The Cooperage was founded here in 1874 by Jonas Spaulding, Jr. After his death in 1900, his sons, two of whom became New Hampshire governors, served as company officers; Stephen Frost, who bought into the firm in 1893, served as manager. Rebuilt after devastating fires in 1921 and 1973, the Spaulding & Frost Cooperage is now the oldest white pine cooperage in the United States."

=== 158. Cornish-Windsor Bridge ===
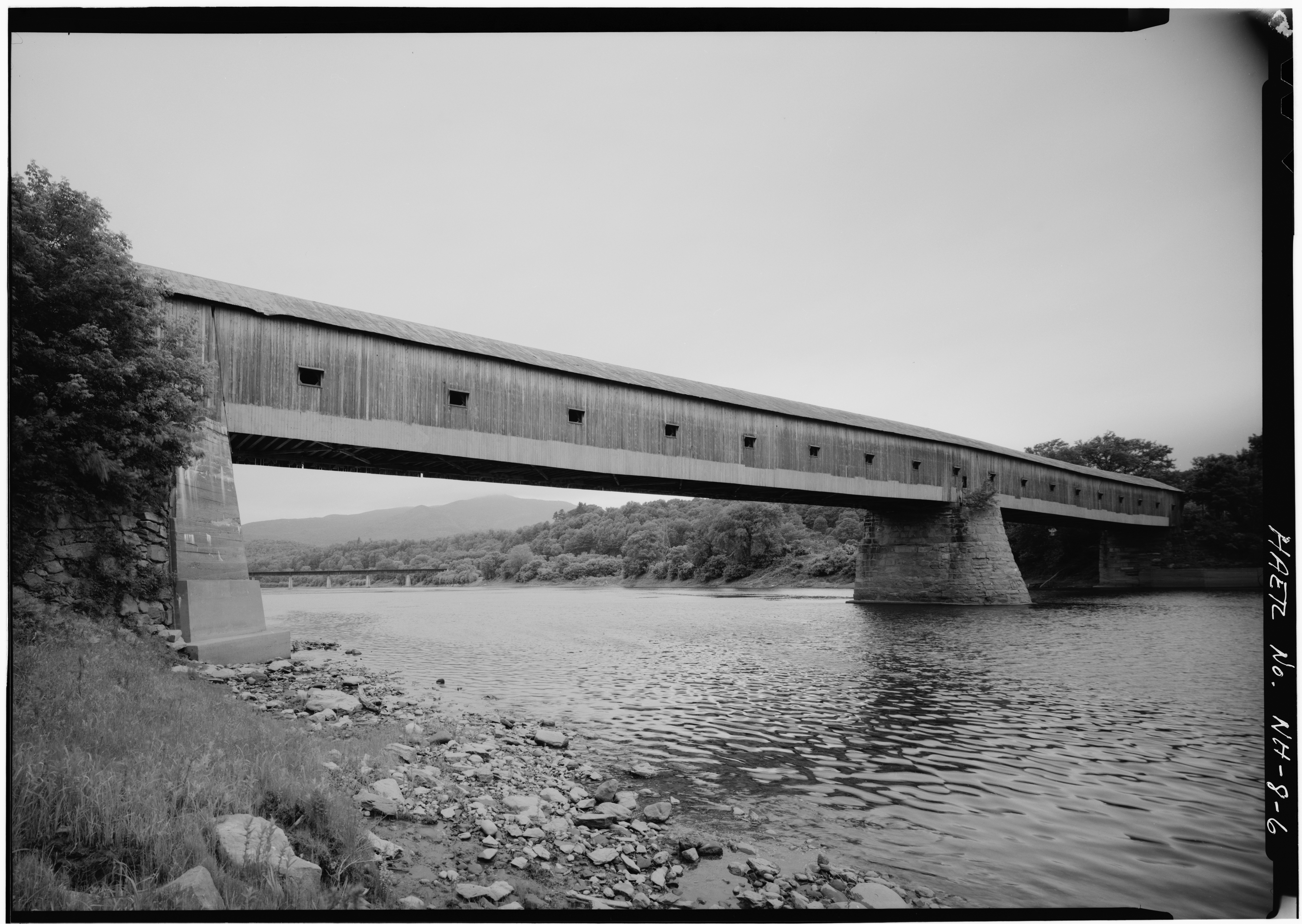
Cornish-Windsor Bridge in 1984

Town of Cornish

"Built in 1866 at the cost of $9,000, this is the longest wooden bridge in the United States and the longest two-span covered bridge in the world. (Note: The 613-foot Smolen–Gulf Bridge in Ohio, which opened in 2008, is now the longest such bridge in the United States.) The fourth bridge at this site, the 460-foot structure was built by Bela J. Fletcher (1811-1877) of Claremont and James F. Tasker (1826-1903) of Cornish, using a lattice truss patented by architect Ithiel Town in 1820 and 1835. Built as a toll bridge by a private corporation, the span was purchased by the State of New Hampshire in 1936 and made toll-free in 1943."

Note: this marker was erected in 1989.

=== 159. Boom Piers ===
City of Berlin

"The small man-made 'islands' in the river were used to secure a chain of boom logs which divided the Androscoggin River during the colorful and dramatic annual log drives, when the Brown Paper Co. and the International Paper Co. shared the river to float their logs from the forests far upriver to the mills at Berlin. The logs were stamped on the ends with a marking hammer to identify their ownership, and they were sorted at a 'sorting gap' further upriver. The log drives ended in 1963. The old piers continue to serve as a reminder of North Country heritage."

=== 160. Haverhill Corner Historic District ===
Town of Haverhill

"NATIONAL REGISTER OF HISTORIC PLACES, 1987"
"TOWN OF HAVERHILL GRANTED, 1763"
"'The Corner' was part of a mile-wide strip granted to Haverhill, claimed by Piermont, and finally divided between the two towns. Its form displays planning concepts required by royal grants but modified by settlers to fit local conditions. Its architecture reflects its history as Grafton County seat (1793-1891) and northern terminus of the first Province Road from the coast, later the Coos Turnpike, (Note: See also List of turnpikes in New Hampshire.) now Court Street. Chief promoter of the village was Col. Charles Johnston, who settled here in 1769. His house and Gov. John Page's still stand, with other notable dwellings, taverns, and public buildings."

=== 161. Ladd-Gilman House ===
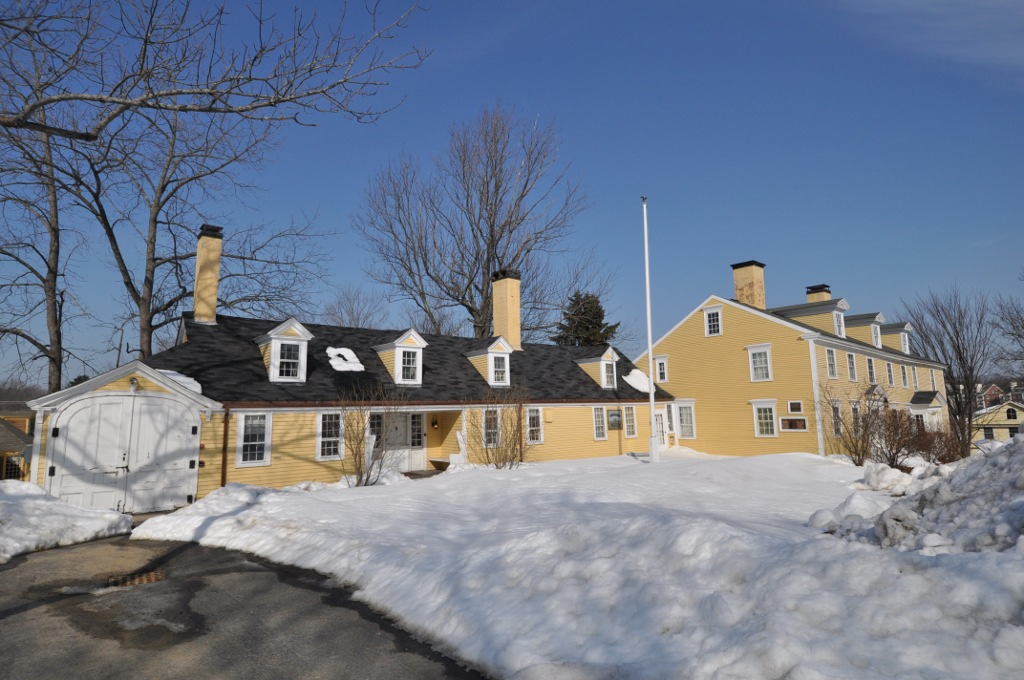
Ladd-Gilman House in Exeter

Town of Exeter

"Built about 1721 as one of New Hampshire's earliest brick houses, and enlarged and clapboarded in the 1750s, this dwelling served as the state treasury during the Revolution. Here were born John Taylor Gilman (1753-1828), who was elected governor for an unequalled total of fourteen years, and his brother Nicholas Gilman, Jr. (1755-1814), a signer of the U.S. Constitution. The house has been maintained since 1902 by the Society of the Cincinnati."

=== 162. New Hill Village ===
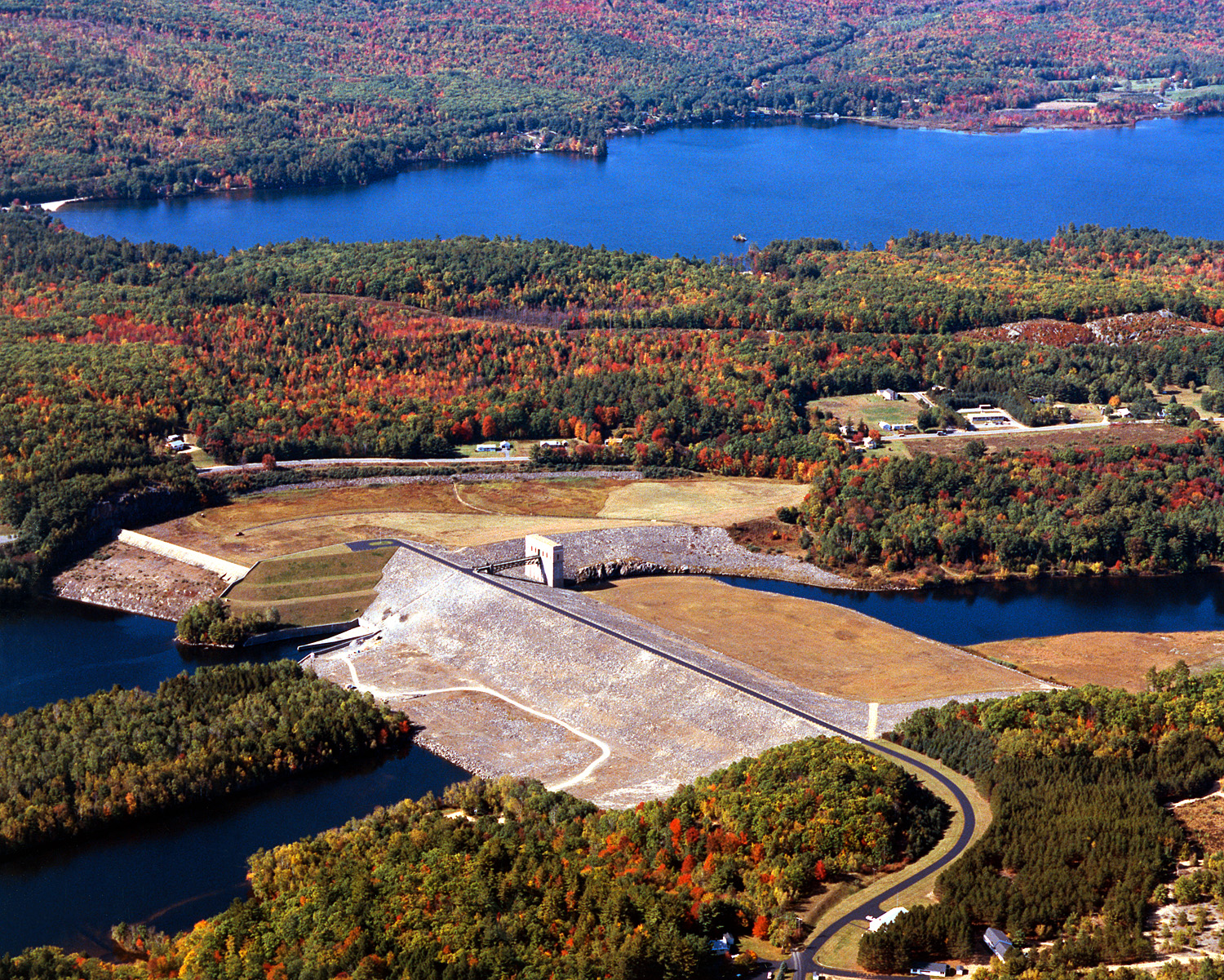
Franklin Falls Dam

Town of Hill

"In February 1937, Hill residents learned that their village, near the Pemigewasset River, was to become a flood control reservoir for the Franklin Falls dam project. By January of 1940, the citizens of Hill formed an association, purchased land, and began planning a new model village with the help of the N.H. State Planning and Development Commission. Construction started in 1940, and by June of 1941 the new town hall and school were completed, along with the streets, water system, and 30 houses. The 1941 town meeting was called to order in the old town hall, recessed, and reconvened in the new village."

=== 163. Boston, Concord, and Montreal Railroad ===
Town of Ashland

"The Boston, Concord & Montreal Railroad was chartered in 1844. Construction of the main line began in Concord in 1846. The tracks were completed to Laconia in 1848, to Ashland in 1849, and to Wells River, Vermont in 1853. The B, C&M RR merged with the Concord Railroad in 1889 to form the Concord & Montreal Railroad, which was taken over by the Boston & Maine Railroad in 1895. The B, C&M RR and its branch lines contributed greatly to the economic development of central and northern New Hampshire and to the growth of tourism in the Lakes Region and the White Mountains."

=== 164. Alton Bay Transportation Center ===
Town of Alton

"This location became a transportation center on August 30, 1851, upon completion of the Cocheco Railroad from Dover to Alton Bay. The first 'Mount Washington' steamboat was built here in 1872. For forty years a railroad terminus, here northbound travelers switched to a stage coach or steamboat. On June 17, 1890 the Lake Shore Railroad opened its line from Alton Bay to Lakeport, only to shut down in 1935. On June 17, 1990 this spot regained its historic name, 'Railroad Square,' to mark the centennial of the Lake Shore Railroad. At that time, seven of the line's ten original stations still stood."

=== 165. The Alexander Scammell Bridge over the Bellamy River ===
City of Dover

"A Revolutionary patriot, soldier, and adopted son of Durham, N.H., Alexander Scammell served with distinction through six years of war from Bunker Hill to Yorktown, where he was wounded, captured, and died six days later, 6 October 1781. Born in Mendon (now Milford) Mass., 1747, he attended Harvard, studied law under John Sullivan. Named Adjutant General of the Army at Valley Forge, he was praised by Washington who said after a long campaign, 'The man who inspired us to do our full duty was Alexander Scammell.' This bridge was named for Scammell by the General Court in 1933." (Note: This bridge, carrying U.S. Route 4 over the Bellamy River, was rebuilt in 1998.)

=== 166. Londonderry Town Pound ===
Town of Londonderry

"Stray farm animals were confined here by elected pounders or reeves until ransomed by their owners. In 1730, David Dickey kept the first pound in the West Parish. When the current boundaries of Londonderry were established in 1836, David Gilcreast contracted to build a free-laid pound of stones to the Selectmen's specifications. For $30.00 Gilcreast supplied both land and materials and constructed this pound in a 'workmanlike manner,' tapering from base to top. This pound faces the Mammoth Road, built in 1831, and has its back to the intersection of the Old Stage Road."

=== 167. Meetinghouse and Hearse House ===
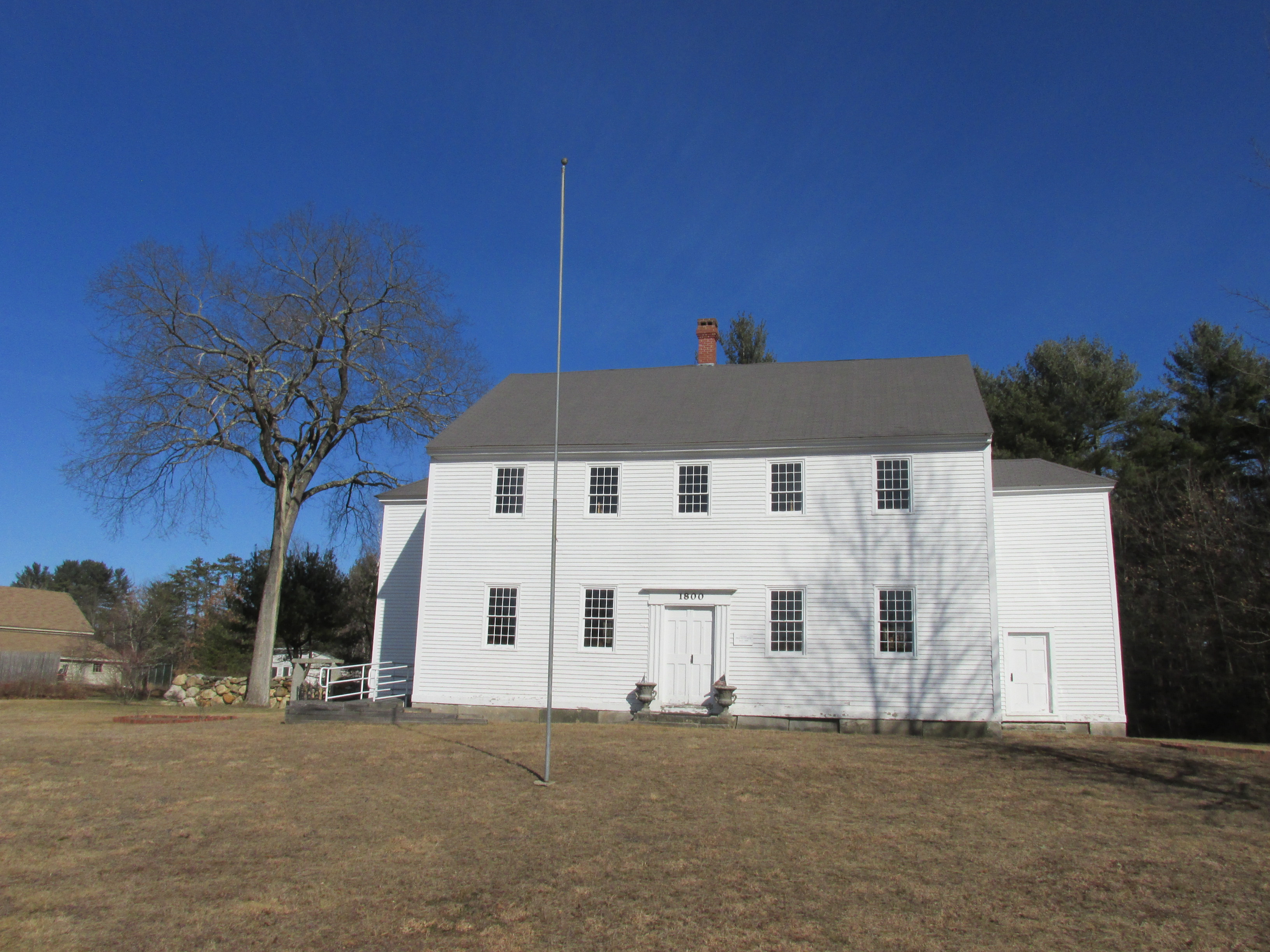
Fremont Meetinghouse

Town of Fremont

"Built in 1800, this steepleless structure, originally unheated, was used for both town and church meetings. This and a similar building in Rockingham, Vt., are the only two survivors of some 70 meeting houses with twin end 'porches' (stairwells) built in New England in the 1700s. The building retains box pews (once privately owned) and a high pulpit. 'Singing seats' in the gallery reflect the introduction of choral music in the late 1700s. The nearby hearse house (1849) marks a transition in local funerals from a hand-carried bier to a horse-drawn vehicle."

=== 168. Gilsum Stone Arch Bridge ===
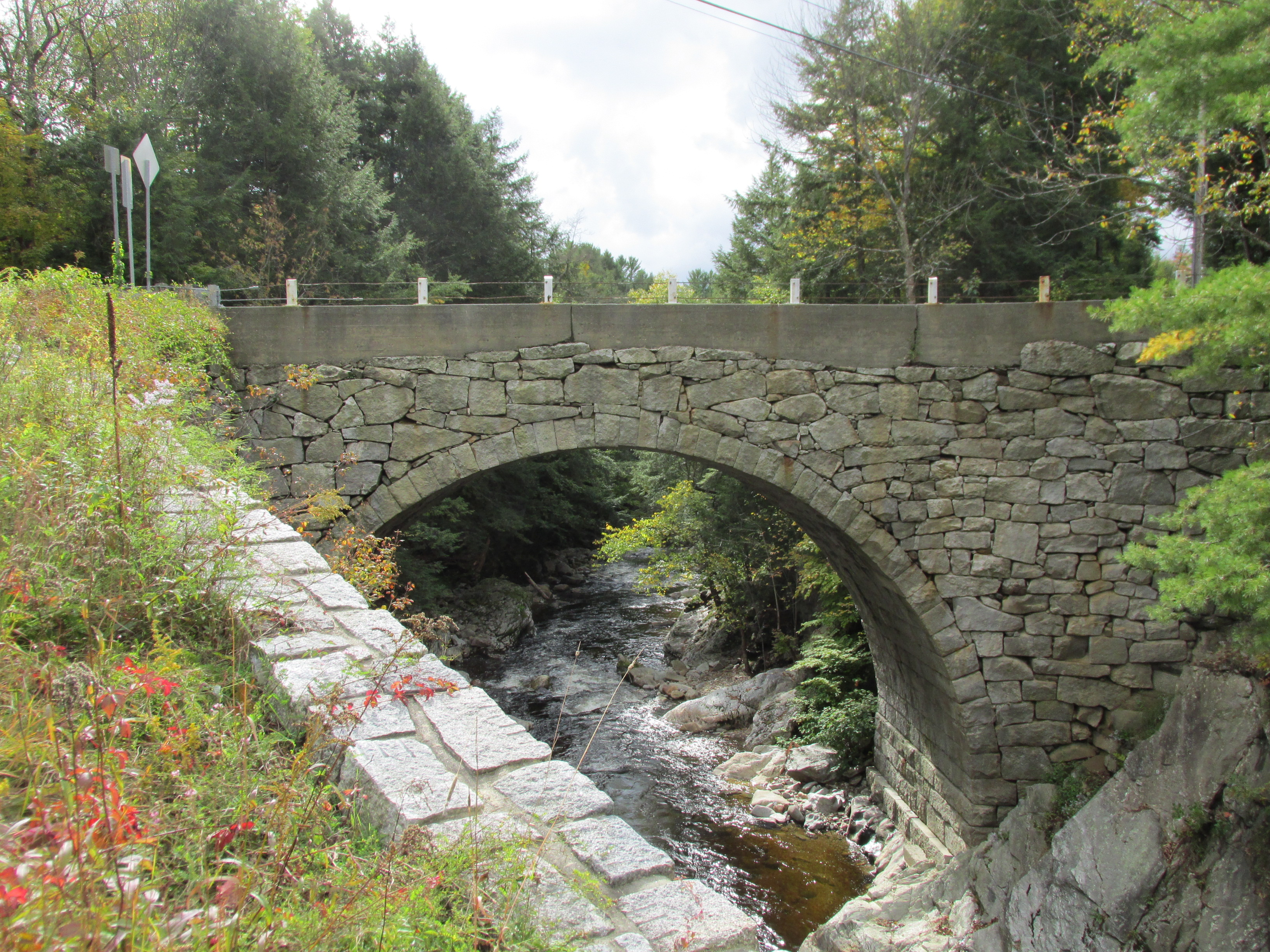
Gilsum Stone Arch Bridge

Town of Gilsum

"With an arch 36'-6" above the average upstream elevation, this bridge has the highest vault of any dry-laid bridge in New Hampshire. Spanning the deep gorge of the Ashuelot River, it was constructed in 1862-63 under the supervision of William L. Kingsbury. Listed in the National Register of Historic Places in 1989."

=== 169. Hawke Meeting House ===
Town of Danville

"Erected prior to June 12, 1775, this is New Hampshire's oldest meeting house in original condition. Built by 27 local proprietors who conveyed it in 1760 to the newly-incorporated Parish of Hawke (now Danville), the building was used for religious services through 1832 and for town meetings through 1887. The Rev. John Page, only regular minister of the parish, died of smallpox in the 1782 epidemic which ravaged the area of 'Tuckertown' and is buried in 'Ye Old Cemetery' just north of here."

=== 170. Civil War Riot of 1861 ===
Town of Fremont

"In 1928, the Exeter News-Letter printed an eye-witness account of Fremont's July 4, 1861 Civil War riot, written by 77-year-old Alden F. Sanborn. After Fremont's loyal citizens raised a 150-foot 'liberty-pole' at nearby Liberty Square and had run up the Union flag, 'a southern sympathizer moved to put a bullet through it. Someone immediately moved to put a bullet through that man. (A small riot ensued) which was soon squelched with the aid of the brave boys in Blue, one of whom remark(ed 'If) we were going to fight the rebels...we had as soon commence here as anywhere.'"

=== 171. Dixville Notch "First in the Nation" ===
Village of Dixville Notch

"New Hampshire has held the first-in-the-nation presidential primaries since 1920. With the first presidential 'beauty contest' in 1952, our citizens have personally met the candidates and by popular ballot have declared their preference for their party's nominee. Since 1960, Dixville has been the first community in the state and country to cast its handful of votes in national elections. On election eve 100% of the eligible voters gather in the Ballot Room of The Balsams. At midnight polls open and a few minutes later promptly close. The results are broadcast around the world."

=== 172. New Hampshire Veterans' Association ===
City of Laconia

"This 'campus,' mostly built in the 1880s, is home to the NH Veterans' Association. Formed in 1875 and chartered in 1881, it is the oldest organization of its kind in the U.S. Initially a summer retreat for Civil War veterans, the NHVA now admits all honorably discharged NH veterans. Its purpose is to guard and protect the colors under which its members fought and all that those colors represent. Listed in the National Register of Historic Places since 1980, this site was leased to the NHVA by the B&M Railroad until 1924, when it was bought by the NHVA with state funds."

=== 173. Lake Coos and the Presidential Range ===
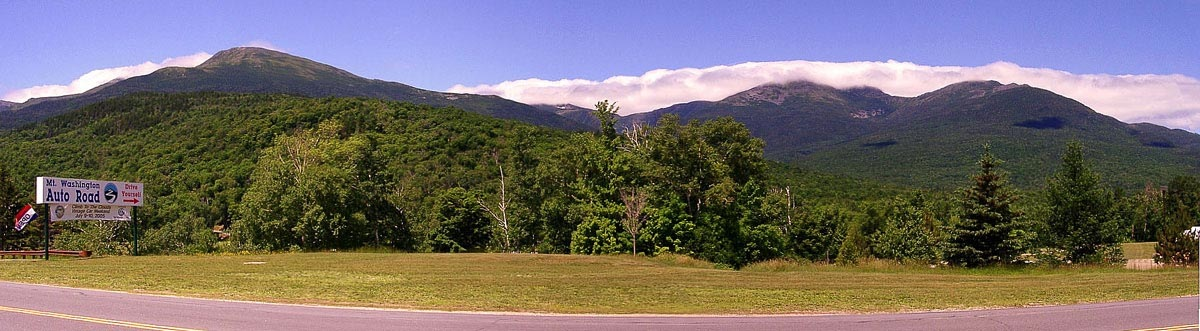
The Presidential Range viewed from Pinkham Notch

Town of Lancaster

"Lancaster, founded in 1763, lies on the bed of glacial Lake Coos, formed as the glaciers receded 14,000 years ago. Today the Connecticut, an American Heritage River, flows along the bottom of the ancient lake.

You stand at a gateway to The Great North Woods Region. To the east, aligned from north to south, are Mounts Madison, Adams, Jefferson, and Washington, the highest peaks of the White Mountains' Presidential Range. Mt. Washington, at 6288 feet, is the highest in the Northeast. The strongest winds ever recorded, 231 miles per hour, were measured on its summit on April 12, 1934." (Note: Mt. Washington's wind speed record was surpassed in Australia in 1996, during Cyclone Olivia.)

=== 174. Loveland Bridge ===
Town of Rumney

"The crutch mill of Lewis H. Loveland, Jr., once located below this bridge, operated from 1890 into the early 20th century, when some thirty industries drew water power from the four mile length of Stinson Brook. Loveland, known as 'King of Crutches,' sent exports as far away as Africa and Australia. During the World War I period his company manufactured more than 3,000 pairs weekly. Loveland's productivity and that of the local mills gave Rumney distinction as the 'Crutch Capital of the World."'

=== 175. New Hampshire's Presidential Primary ===
City of Concord

"Since 1920, New Hampshire has held its presidential primary election at least seven days before any other state. Changes in New Hampshire law in 1952 made the primary a direct selection of presidential candidates, not a mere choice of delegates pledged to specific contenders. Held in February or March, the New Hampshire primary has become a critical first stop on the road to the White House. Taking their responsibility seriously, New Hampshire voters test candidates during the months leading to the primary and have usually favored the candidate who ultimately attains the Oval Office."
