= Danville Town House =

- U.S. National Register of Historic Places
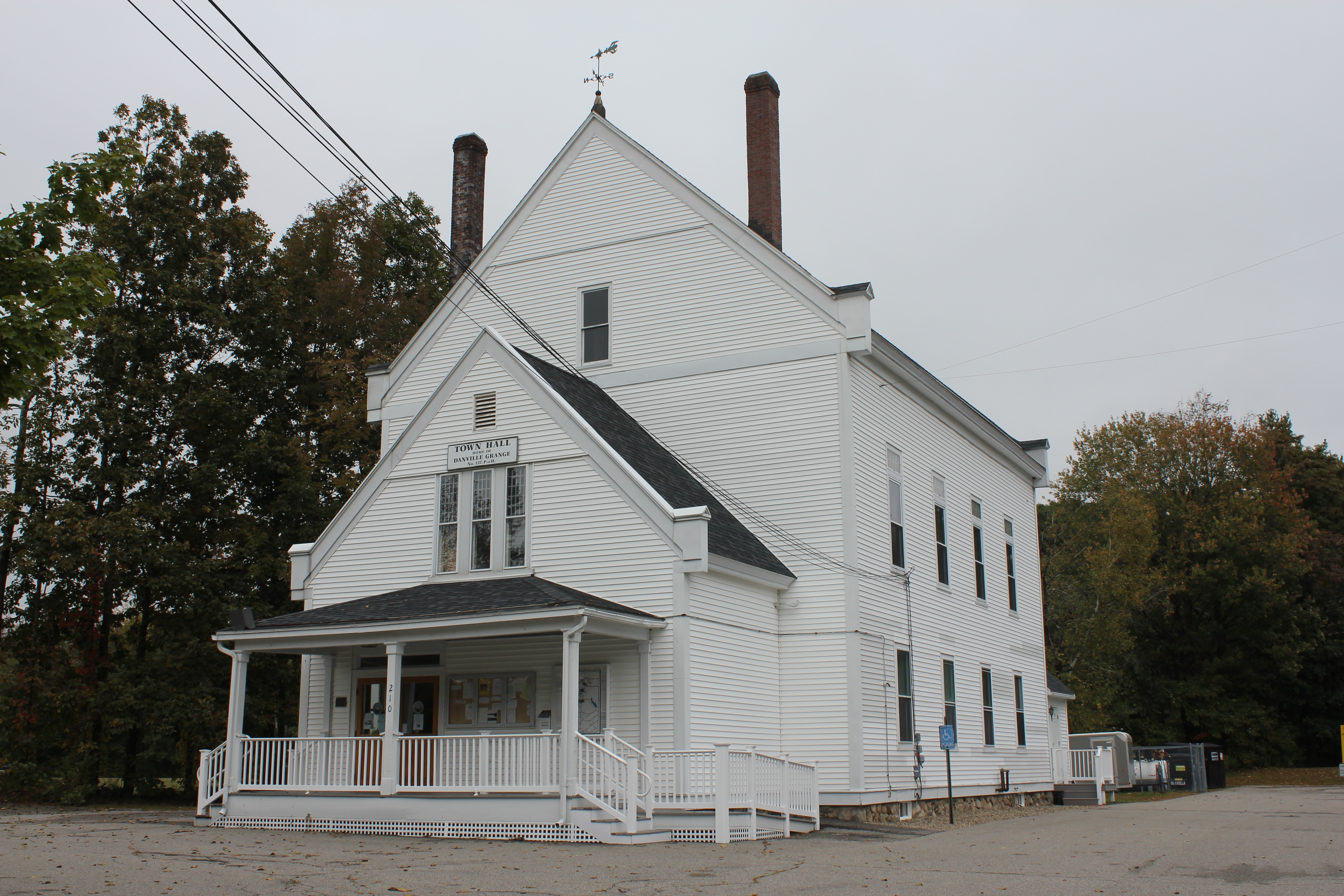

- Location within New Hampshire Location within the United States
- Location: 210 Main St., NH 111A, Danville, New Hampshire
- Coordinates: 42°54′54″N 71°7′24″W
- Area: 1 acre (0.40 ha)
- Built: 1886
- Architect: Collins, Albert A.
- Architectural style: Gothic
- NRHP reference No.: 00001465
- Added to NRHP: December 1, 2000

The Danville Town House is the town hall of Danville, New Hampshire. It is located at 210 Main Street (New Hampshire Route 111A). The 2 1/2-story wood-frame building was completed in 1887, replacing the old 18th-century meetinghouse. It houses the town offices, and a meeting space in which town meetings and other civic and social events take place. The building was listed on the National Register of Historic Places in 2000.

== Description and history ==
The Danville Town House stands in the rural town center of Danville, on the east side of Main Street between Gerry Drive and the Baptist church. It is a 2 1/2-story wood-frame structure, with a gabled roof and exterior finished in a modern synthetic imitation of clapboards (with the original wooden clapboards underneath). It has modest nods toward late 19th-century Victorian architecture, including slightly parapeted gables with projecting ends. The front porch originally had turned posts and a spindled valance; it has been replaced by square posts and balusters. On the inside, the town offices are located on the ground floor, while the second floor has a ballroom with a stage area at the eastern end.

The building was constructed in 1887, after the town's 18th-century meetinghouse was judged inadequate to meet the town's needs for municipal functions. This building's location in southern Danville was not without controversy: some objected to its more elaborate Victorian styling, and farmers in the northern part of the town objected to its relatively remote location, but were outvoted by more numerous southerners. An attempt was made to burn the building down the night before its dedication. The ballroom has been used for many public and private functions, including use by local civic groups, the Grange, and the Boy Scouts.

== See also ==
- National Register of Historic Places listings in Rockingham County, New Hampshire
