= Gilsum Stone Arch Bridge =

- U.S. National Register of Historic Places
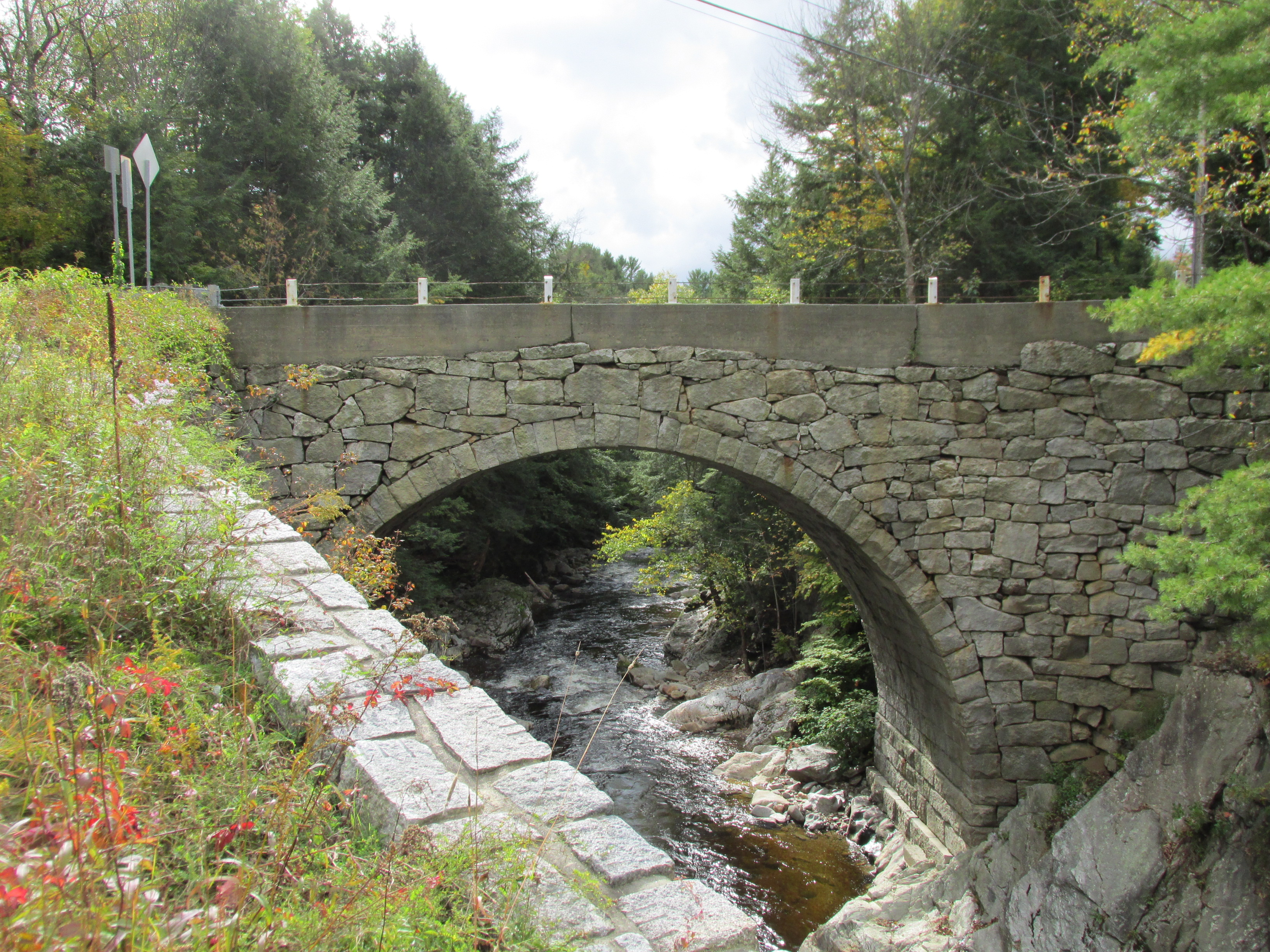

- Location within New Hampshire Location within the United States
- Location: Surry Rd. over the Ashuelot River W of jct. NH 10, Gilsum, New Hampshire
- Coordinates: 43°2′20″N 72°16′14″W
- Area: less than one acre
- Built: 1863
- Architect: William Leonard Kingsbury
- Architectural style: Dry Masonry Arch Bridge
- NRHP reference No.: 89001207
- Added to NRHP: August 31, 1989

The Gilsum Stone Arch Bridge carries Surry Road over the Ashuelot River in Gilsum, New Hampshire. Built in 1862–63, it is one of the highest stone arch bridges in the state. It has a span of 47 feet 8 inches (14.53 m), and an average height over the river of 36 feet 6 inches (11.13 m). The roadway is 43 feet 6 inches (13.26 m) above the riverbed. It stands on the site of four previous bridges, where the river passes through a deep gorge. The previous bridge was also a stone arch bridge, which was built in 1860 and collapsed (due to inferior construction) a few months later. It was designed by William Leonard Kingsbury, a local official; its builders are not known because the town's records were destroyed in a fire. The present bridge's vault is carefully constructed from dry-laid granite voussoirs that were shaped for a very precise fit, with larger stones at the lower ends of the arch, and a smaller ones at the crown. Some of the stones were left with rough surfaces, while others were hammered smooth.

In contrast to the fine stonework of the arch, the abutments and retaining walls are constructed of split-faced granite in irregular courses, wedged in place by stone chips. The northeast abutment continues along the river as a wing wall up to a massive stone pier, the former site of a mill dam. The southeast abutment is a granite reconstruction of coursed ashlar over concrete, done in 1951. The original granite coping which lined the roadway shoulders has been replaced by concrete with steel guard cables, c. 1920s.

The bridge was listed on the National Register of Historic Places in 1989.

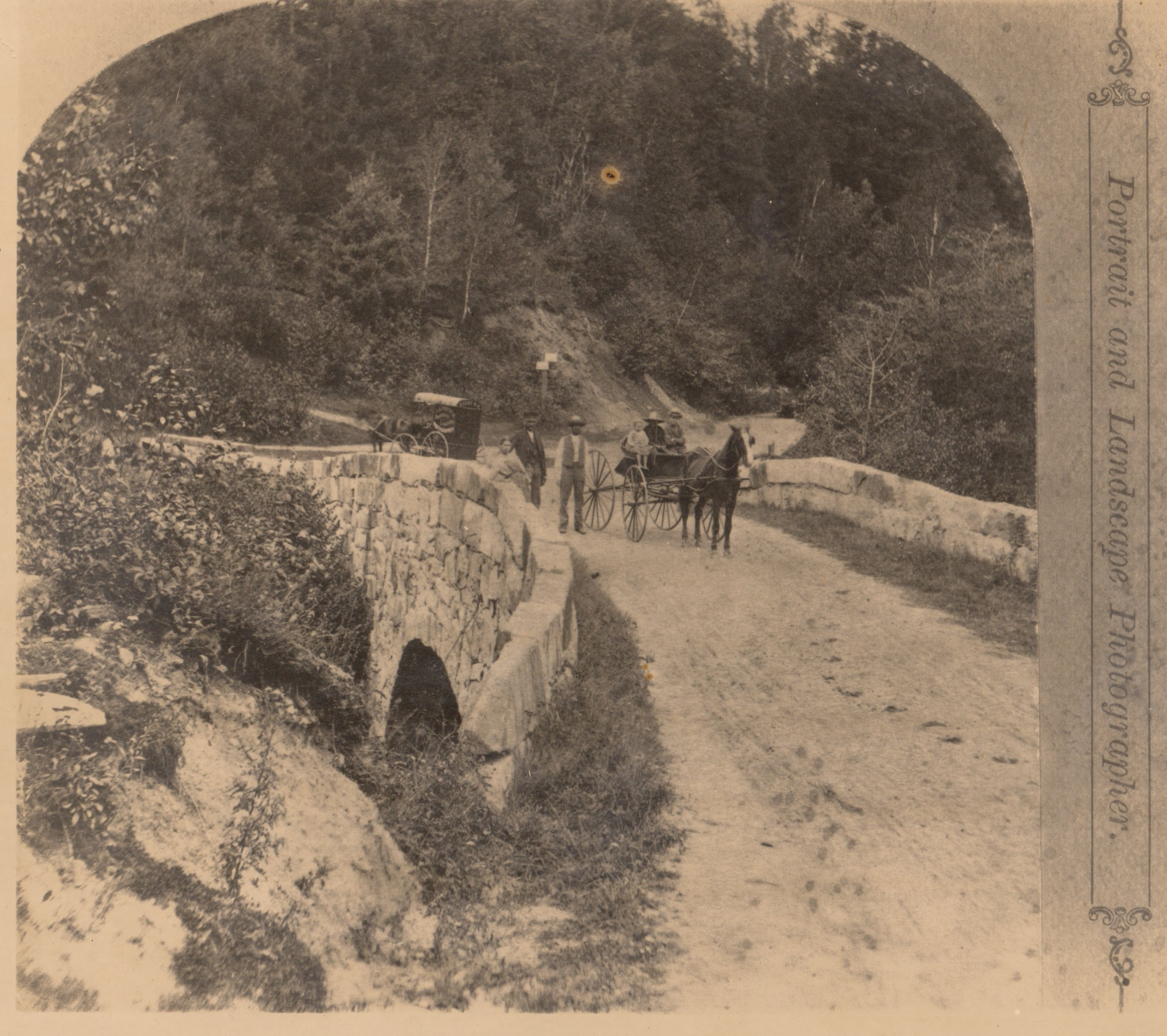

== See also ==
- List of bridges on the National Register of Historic Places in New Hampshire
- National Register of Historic Places listings in Cheshire County, New Hampshire
- New Hampshire Historical Marker No. 168: Gilsum Stone Arch Bridge
