= Fremont, New Hampshire =

American town

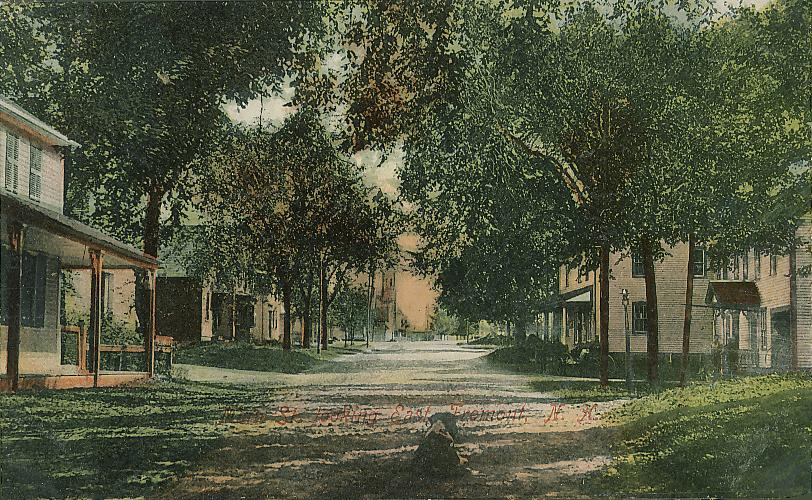
- Main Street in 1909

- Seal

- Location in Rockingham County and the state of New Hampshire.
- Coordinates: 42°59′27″N 71°08′33″W
- Country: United States
- State: New Hampshire
- County: Rockingham
- Incorporated: 1764
- Villages: Fremont; Pages Corner

Area
  - Total: 17.4 sq mi (45.1 km^{2})
  - Land: 17.2 sq mi (44.5 km^{2})
  - Water: 0.23 sq mi (0.6 km^{2}) 1.30%
- Elevation: 155 ft (47 m)

Population (2020)
  - Total: 4,739
  - Density: 276/sq mi (106.5/km^{2})
- Time zone: UTC-5 (Eastern)
  - Summer (DST): UTC-4 (Eastern)
- ZIP code: 03044
- Area code: 603
- FIPS code: 33-27940
- GNIS feature ID: 873602
- Website: www.fremont.nh.gov

Fremont is a town in Rockingham County, New Hampshire, United States. The population was 4,739 at the 2020 census, up from 4,283 at the 2010 census. Fremont is crossed by the Rockingham Recreation Trail (a rail trail) and NH Route 107.

== History ==
Settled in the 1720s, Fremont was originally part of Exeter. The area was once famous for its heavy growth of high-quality eastern white pine trees, reserved for use as masts of the Royal Navy. But residents began to use the wood for home construction. When in 1734 David Dunbar, surveyor-general, visited the Copyhold Mill to inspect fallen lumber, local citizens assembled, discharged firearms, and convinced Dunbar to leave. Dunbar returned emboldened with 10 men, but was forced to flee to a local tavern after citizens disguised as Indians attacked them. This insurrection became known as the Mast Tree Riot. (Note: Not to be confused with the later Pine Tree Riot of 1772, which took place in Weare, New Hampshire.)

The town was granted in 1764 by colonial governor Benning Wentworth as "Poplin". In 1853, Poplin petitioned the state legislature to change the name. In 1854, it became "Fremont" after General John C. Frémont, the first candidate of the Republican Party in the presidential election of 1856.

The town is noted for the unspoiled Fremont Meeting House, built in 1800 and listed on the National Register of Historic Places since 1993. The town was once home to the largest brickyard in the state, producing five million bricks a year, and to the downtown Spaulding & Frost Cooperage, established in 1874, one of the oldest operating wooden barrel manufacturers in the country.

=== B-52 crash ===
On August 10, 1959, a Boeing B-52 Stratofortress crashed in Fremont. The aircraft, serial number 54-2682, had departed Westover Air Force Base in Chicopee, Massachusetts. During flight at 34,000 feet (10,000 m), the crew heard several loud bangs, the radar system became inoperative, and the plane began to vibrate. As the vibrations became more severe, the plane began to lose altitude, and the pilot ordered the crew to bail out at 14,000 feet (4,300 m). The pilot remained with the aircraft for several additional minutes, then ejected. The plane crashed into Spruce Swamp at 2:50 p.m. local time. The pilot and seven crew members all survived. The crash was attributed to a failure of the radome on the nose of the aircraft.

== Geography ==
According to the United States Census Bureau, the town has a total area of 17.4 square miles (45.1 km^{2}), of which 17.2 square miles (44.5 km^{2}) are land and 0.2 square miles (0.6 km^{2}) are water, comprising 1.30% of the town. The highest point in Fremont is an unnamed summit, with an elevation of 322 feet (98 m) above sea level, near the town's western border. The town is drained by the Exeter River, except for the northernmost part which is drained by headwaters of the Piscassic River. Fremont lies fully within the Piscataqua River (Coastal) watershed.

=== Adjacent municipalities ===
- Epping (north)
- Brentwood (east)
- Kingston (southeast)
- Danville (south)
- Sandown (southwest)
- Chester (southwest)
- Raymond (northwest)

== Demographics ==
Historical population
Census	Pop.	Note	%±
1790	493		—
1850	509		—
1860	579		13.8%
1870	527		−9.0%
1880	624		18.4%
1890	726		16.3%
1900	749		3.2%
1910	622		−17.0%
1920	519		−16.6%
1930	571		10.0%
1940	634		11.0%
1950	698		10.1%
1960	783		12.2%
1970	993		26.8%
1980	1,333		34.2%
1990	2,576		93.2%
2000	3,510		36.3%
2010	4,283		22.0%
2020	4,739		10.6%
U.S. Decennial Census

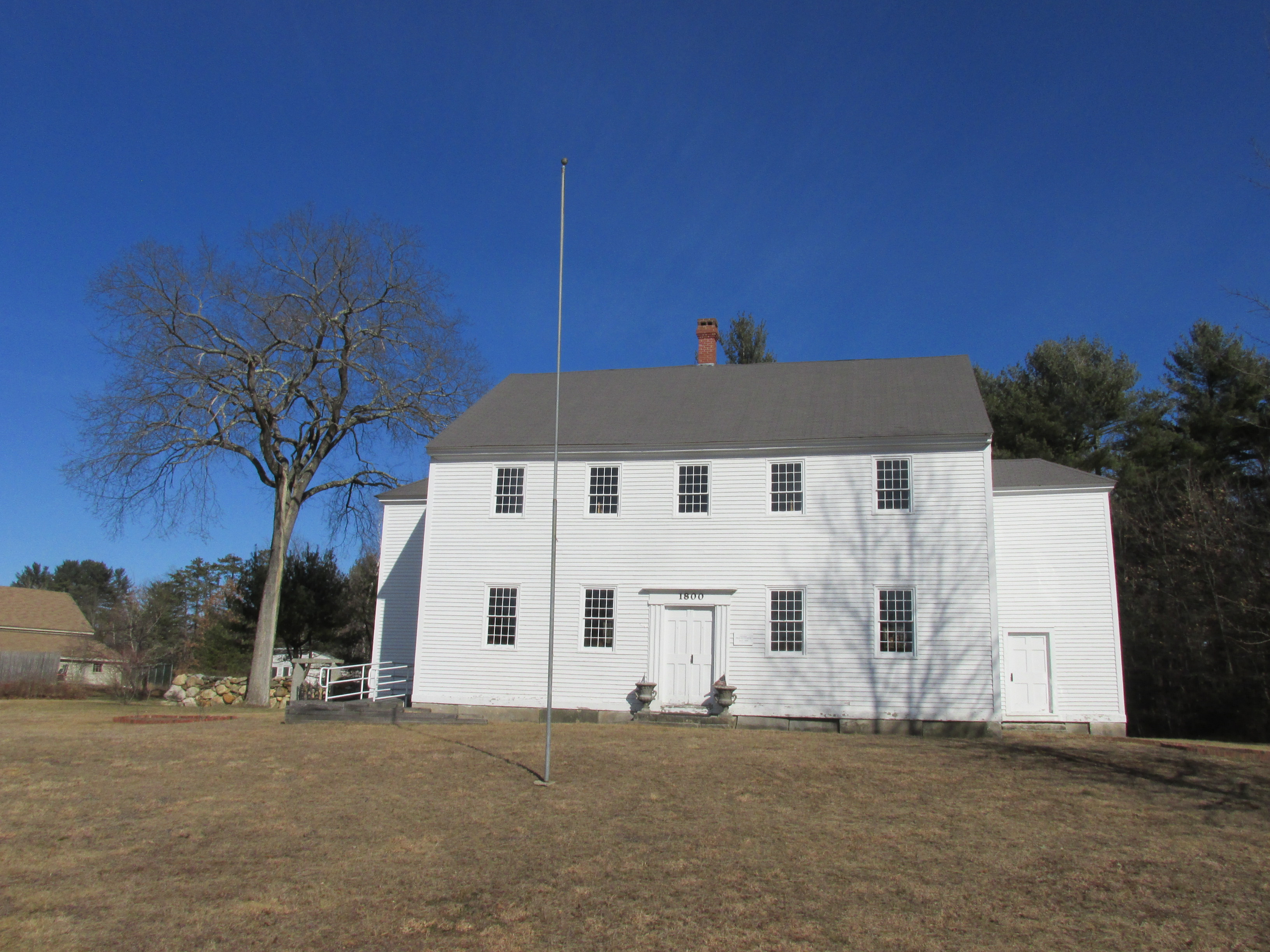
Fremont Meeting House

As of the census of 2000, there were 3,510 people, 1,165 households, and 983 families residing in the town. The population density was 204.6 inhabitants per square mile (79.0/km^{2}). There were 1,201 housing units at an average density of 70.0 per square mile (27.0/km^{2}). The racial makeup of the town was 98.15% White, 0.06% African American, 0.06% Native American, 0.34% Asian, 0.51% from other races, and 0.88% from two or more races. Hispanic or Latino of any race were 0.77% of the population.

There were 1,165 households, out of which 44.0% had children under the age of 18 living with them, 74.1% were married couples living together, 5.8% had a female householder with no husband present, and 15.6% were non-families. 10.4% of all households were made up of individuals, and 3.5% had someone living alone who was 65 years of age or older. The average household size was 2.99 and the average family size was 3.20.

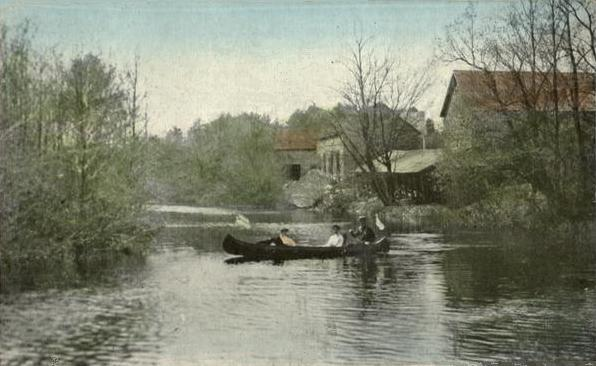
The Exeter River at Sand Hill in 1913

In the town, the population was spread out, with 29.1% under the age of 18, 5.3% from 18 to 24, 38.0% from 25 to 44, 20.5% from 45 to 64, and 7.2% who were 65 years of age or older. The median age was 36 years. For every 100 females, there were 96.4 males. For every 100 females age 18 and over, there were 96.4 males.

The median income for a household in the town was $62,171, and the median income for a family was $63,808. Males had a median income of $45,560 versus $27,964 for females. The per capita income for the town was $24,082. About 3.8% of families and 4.2% of the population were below the poverty line, including 5.1% of those under age 18 and 5.0% of those age 65 or over.

== Transportation ==
Two New Hampshire state routes cross Fremont.

- NH 107 crosses from Raymond in the northwest to Brentwood in the southeast, following Main Street through the center of town.
- NH 111A enters from Danville in the south, runs along Danville Road north to Main Street, then joins a concurrency with NH 107 running east, before leaving along Middle Road to the north shortly before entering Brentwood.

== Sites of interest ==
- Fremont Meeting House (1800), also known as the Poplin Meeting House, one of only two 18th-century twin-porch meeting houses in New England
- Fremont Town Hall (1911), the only tin-sided town hall in New Hampshire
- 1820 Country Market and Deli, fourth-oldest country store in New Hampshire and tenth-oldest in New England

== Notable people ==
- Lee Bergere (1918–2007), actor known for his work on Dynasty
- Dan Itse (born 1958), former New Hampshire State Representative
- Frank J. Kozacka (1915–2010), member of the New Hampshire House of Representatives
- The Shaggs, American all-female rock and outsider music band

== See also ==
- New Hampshire Historical Marker No. 142: Mast Tree Riot of 1734
- New Hampshire Historical Marker No. 156: John Brown Family – Gunsmiths
- New Hampshire Historical Marker No. 157: Spaulding & Frost Cooperage
- New Hampshire Historical Marker No. 167: Meetinghouse and Hearse House
- New Hampshire Historical Marker No. 170: Civil War Riot of 1861
- New Hampshire Historical Marker No. 277: Cold War-Era Bomber Crash
