= Haverhill Corner Historic District =

Historic district in New Hampshire, United States

- U.S. National Register of Historic Places
- U.S. Historic district
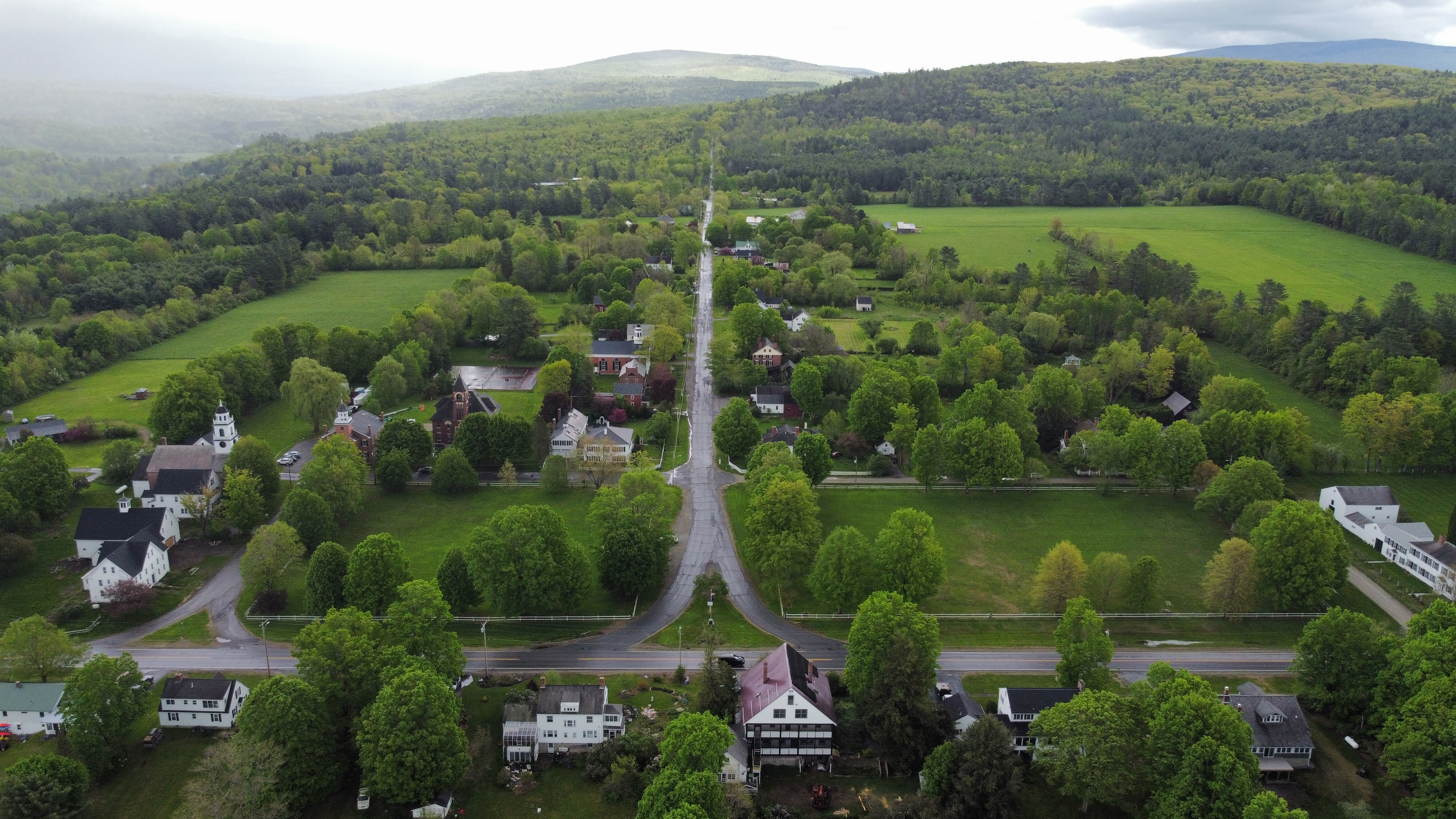
- Aerial image of the Haverhill Corner Historic District.

- Location within New Hampshire Location within the United States
- Location: Haverhill, New Hampshire, along NH 10 from Piermont to northern intersection with NH 25; includes Court St. from NH 10 to approx. ½ mile east
- Coordinates: 44°1′53″N 72°3′51″W
- Area: 544 acres (220 ha)
- Architect: Multiple
- Architectural style: Greek Revival, Late Victorian, Federal
- NRHP reference No.: 87001415
- Added to NRHP: August 27, 1987

The Haverhill Corner Historic District encompasses the early civic center of Haverhill, New Hampshire, United States. The district is focused on the junction of New Hampshire Route 10 and Court Street, which was historically a major through route. Court Street is flanked at the junction by a pair of large grassy common areas which are bounded by School Street and Route 10. Buildings, predominantly Federal in character and built in the late 18th and early 19th centuries, are arrayed around these commons, and historic buildings line Route 10 and Court Street for a short distance away from the commons. Prominent buildings in the district include the 1827 Federal-style First Congregational Church, the 1840 former courthouse that now houses the public library and local historical society, and the Romanesque Revival 1897 Haverhill Academy Junior High School building. The area declined in importance after the railroad bypassed it, resulting in the gradual relocation of civic functions to the Woodsville area. The district was listed on the National Register of Historic Places in 1987.

Haverhill was the first major colonial settlement in northern New Hampshire, founded in 1763 by soldiers of the French and Indian War who recognized it for its farming potential. The oldest buildings in the district are houses built between about 1769 and the start of the American Revolutionary War. When Grafton County was established in 1769, Haverhill was named its shire town, a role it continues to fulfill. Early civic buildings were placed in this area, which became the terminus of one of the main roads through interior New Hampshire, running from the seacoast to the Connecticut River (the road is now known in Haverhill as Court Street). In the early 19th century, the corner acquired all of the trappings of a county seat, with taverns and the homes and offices of lawyers. For many years the 1813 academy building also served as the courthouse. The decision in the mid-19th century to locate the railroad at Woodsville meant that economic and county functions were gradually moved there. In the 20th century, Haverhill Corner became an area of summer residences, and long-time resident Mildred Page made a bequest for the maintenance of the village's historic civic buildings.

== See also ==
- National Register of Historic Places listings in Grafton County, New Hampshire
- New Hampshire Historical Marker No. 160: Haverhill Corner Historic District
