= Frank J. Kozacka =

American politician

Member of the New Hampshire House of Representatives from the Rockingham 13th district
- In office 1978–1984

Personal details
- Born: Frank Joseph Kozacka; April 20, 1915 Newburyport, Massachusetts, U.S.
- Died: July 5, 2010 (aged 95) Fremont, New Hampshire, U.S.
- Party: Democratic
- Education: Saint Anselm College; Boston University; Syracuse University

Frank Joseph Kozacka (April 20, 1915 – July 5, 2010) was an American politician. A member of the Democratic Party, he served in the New Hampshire House of Representatives from 1978 to 1984.

== Life and career ==
Kozacka was born in Newburyport, Massachusetts, the son of Bronislaw Kozacka and Nellie Gurak. He served in the United States Navy during World War II. After his discharge, he attended and graduated from Saint Anselm College, which after graduating, he earned his master's degrees from Boston University and Syracuse University. After earning his degrees, he worked as a biology teacher and coached football at Amesbury High School.

Kozacka served in the New Hampshire House of Representatives from 1978 to 1984.

== Death ==
Kozacka died at the Colonial Poplin Nursing Home in Fremont, New Hampshire on July 5, 2010, at the age of 85.
