= Colonial meeting house =

Type of building in New England, US

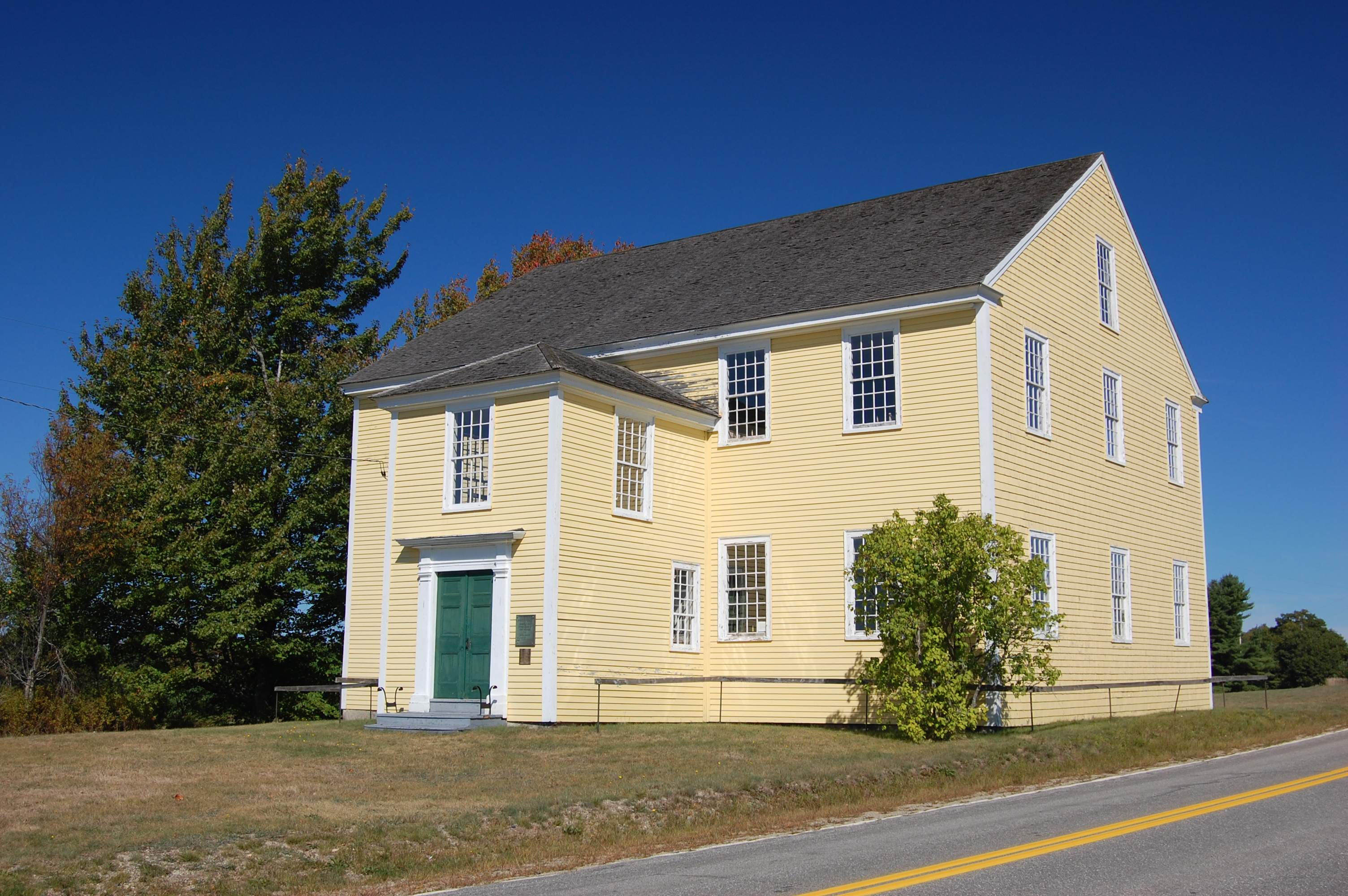
Colonial meeting house in Alna, Maine

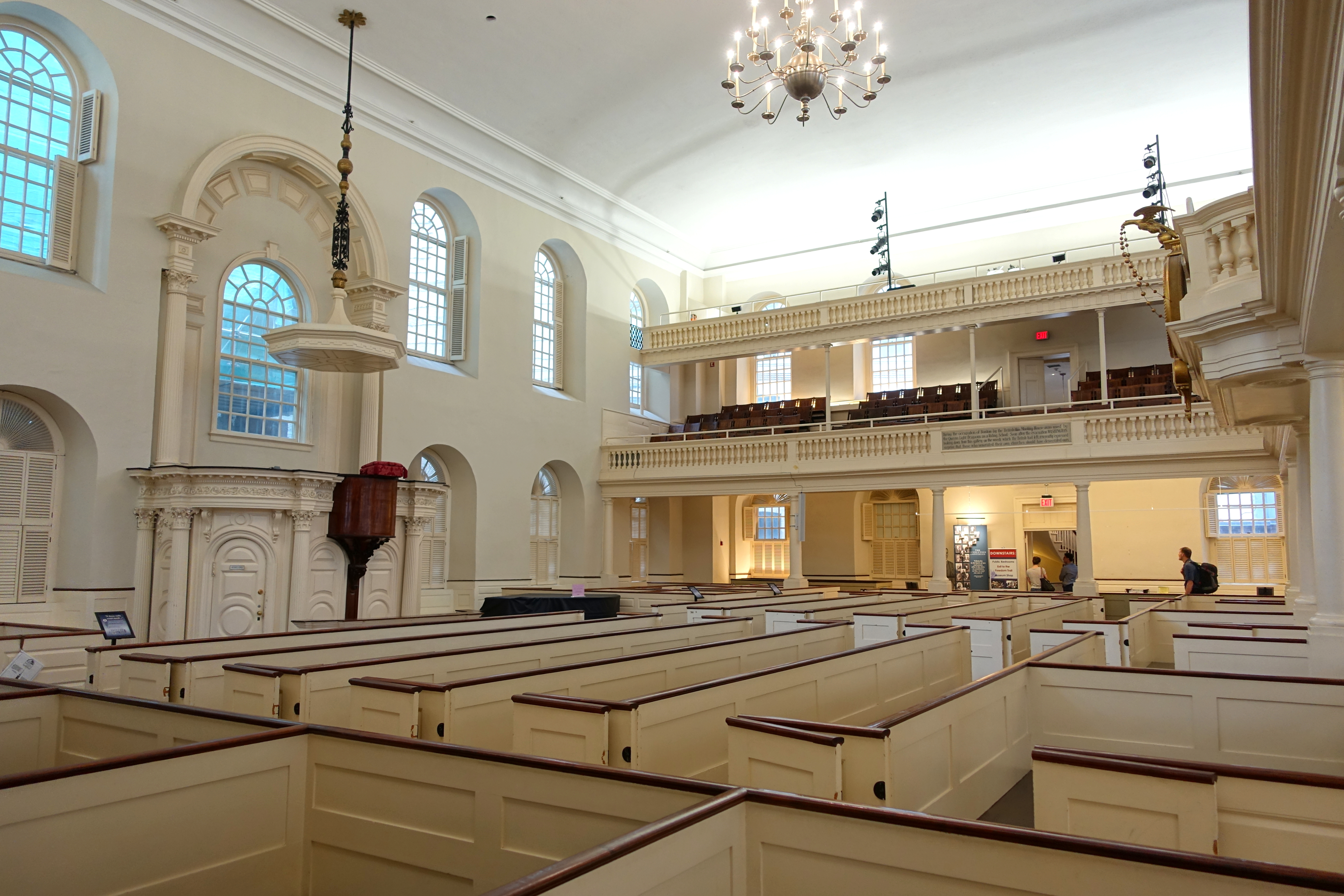
Interior of Old South Meeting House, a colonial meeting house in Boston, Massachusetts

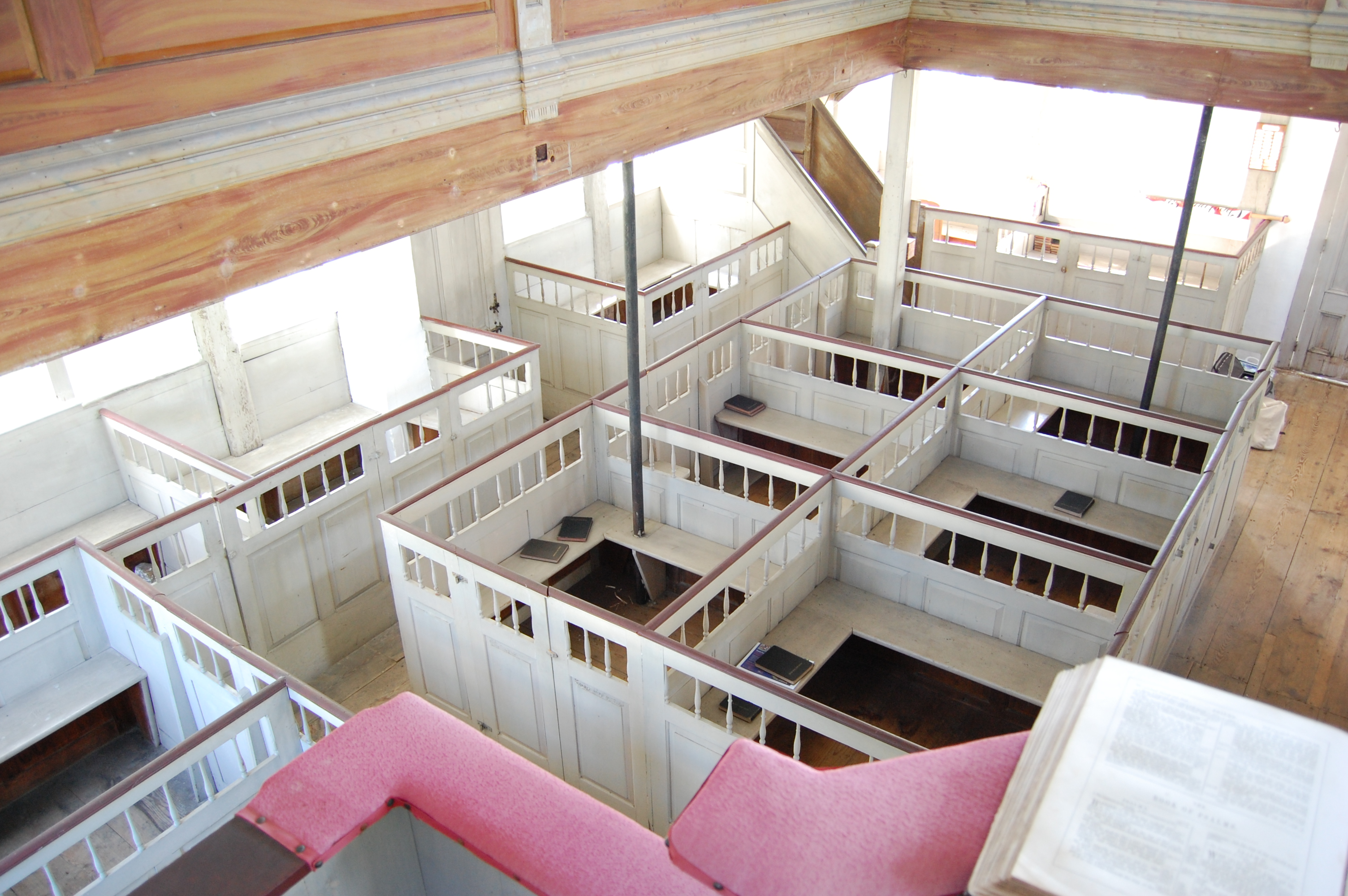
Box pews in the colonial meeting house in Millville, Massachusetts

A colonial meeting house was a meeting house used by communities in colonial New England. Built using tax money, the colonial meeting house was the focal point of the community where the town's residents could discuss local issues, conduct religious worship, and engage in town business.

== History ==
The origin of the "town meeting" form of government can be traced to meeting houses of the colonies.

The meeting houses that survive today were generally built in the second half of the 18th century. Most were almost square, with a steep pitched roof running east to west. There were usually three doors: The one in the center of the long south wall was called the "Door of Honor," and was used by the minister and his family, and honored out-of-town guests. The other doors were located in the middle of the east and west walls, and were used by women and men, respectively. A balcony (called a "gallery") was usually built on the east, south, and west walls, and a high pulpit was located on the north wall.

Following the separation of church and state, some towns architecturally separated the building's religious and governmental functions by constructing a floor at the balcony level, and using the first floor for town business, and the second floor for church.

Most of these buildings that are still standing have been renovated several times to meet the needs of their owners and the style of the time. In the early 19th century, for example, there was a demand for churches that had one entrance on a short end of the building, a long aisle to a pulpit on the other short end, and slip pews instead of box pews.

== Description ==
The colonial meeting house was the central focus of every New England town, and was usually the largest building in the town. They were simple buildings with no statues, decorations, stained glass, or crosses on the walls. Box pews were provided for families, and single men, single women, and slaves usually sat in the balconies. Large windows were located at both the ground floor and gallery levels. It was a status symbol to have much glass in the windows, as the glass was expensive and had to be imported from England. A pulpit window, between the levels of the ground floor and gallery windows, was usually located in the center of the north wall. This window is one of the hallmarks of a colonial meeting house.

As it took considerable effort to build a new post-and-beam end wall, the need for additional space was often met by cutting the building in half, separating the front and back halves, and filling in space between them. At this time it was also common to build steeples over the entrances, either incorporated into the building or as part of an entrance porch that was added to the building's end. Many of the typical white New England churches started out as a colonial meeting house.

== See also ==
- Moot hall

== Gallery ==
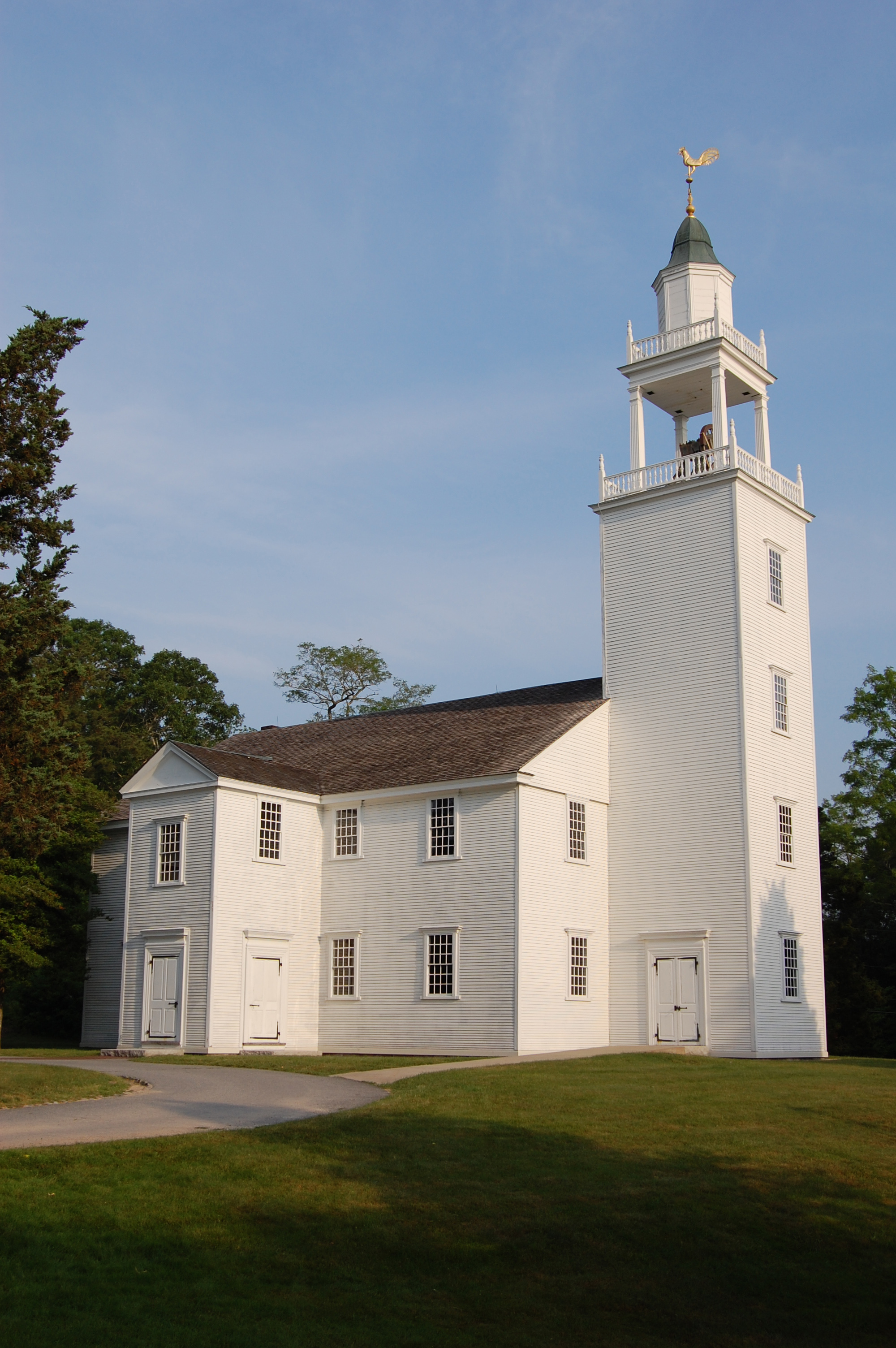
The colonial meeting house in West Barnstable, Massachusetts

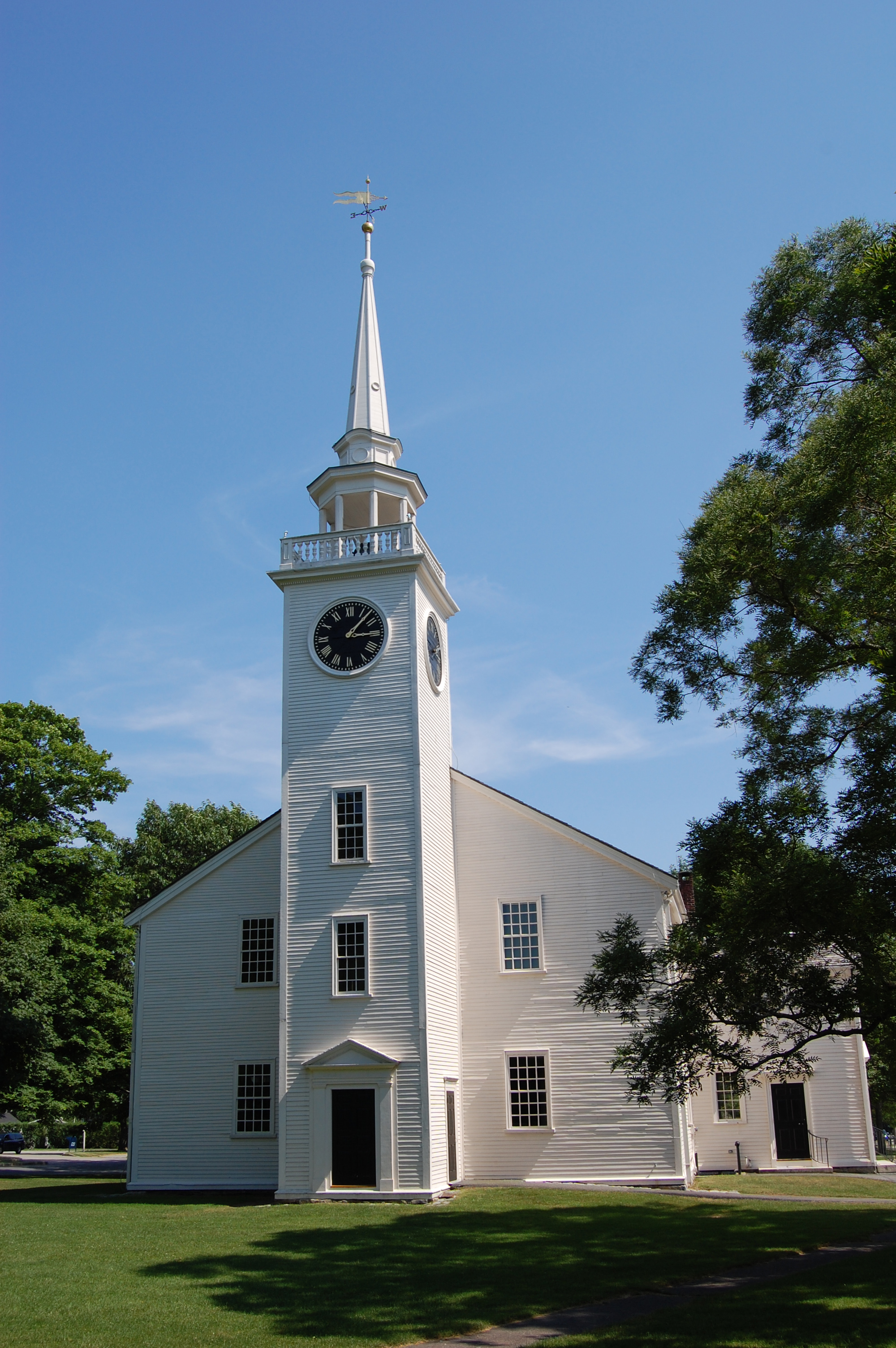
Colonial meeting house in Cohasset, Massachusetts

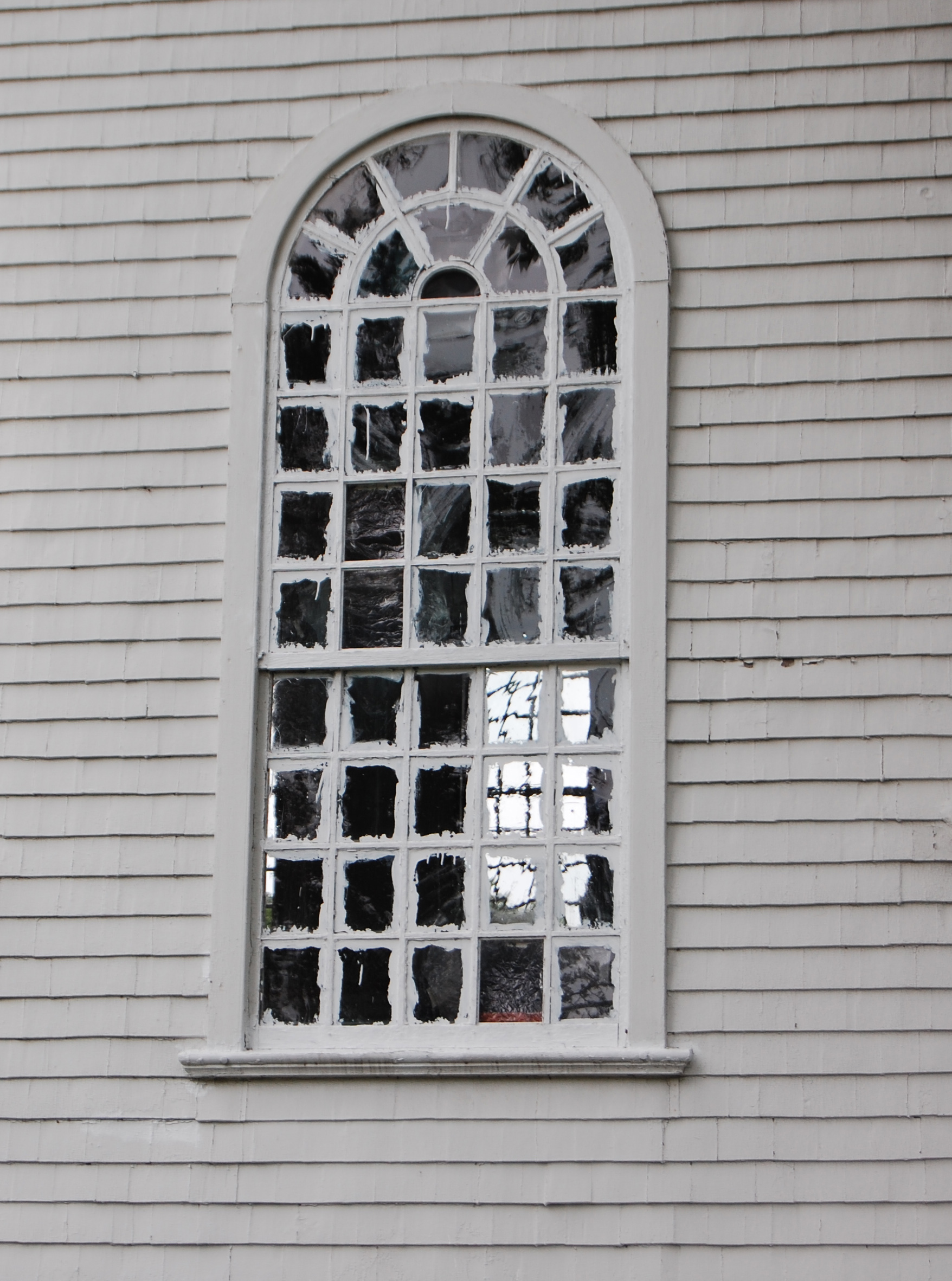
Pulpit window in the colonial meeting house in Brooklyn, Connecticut

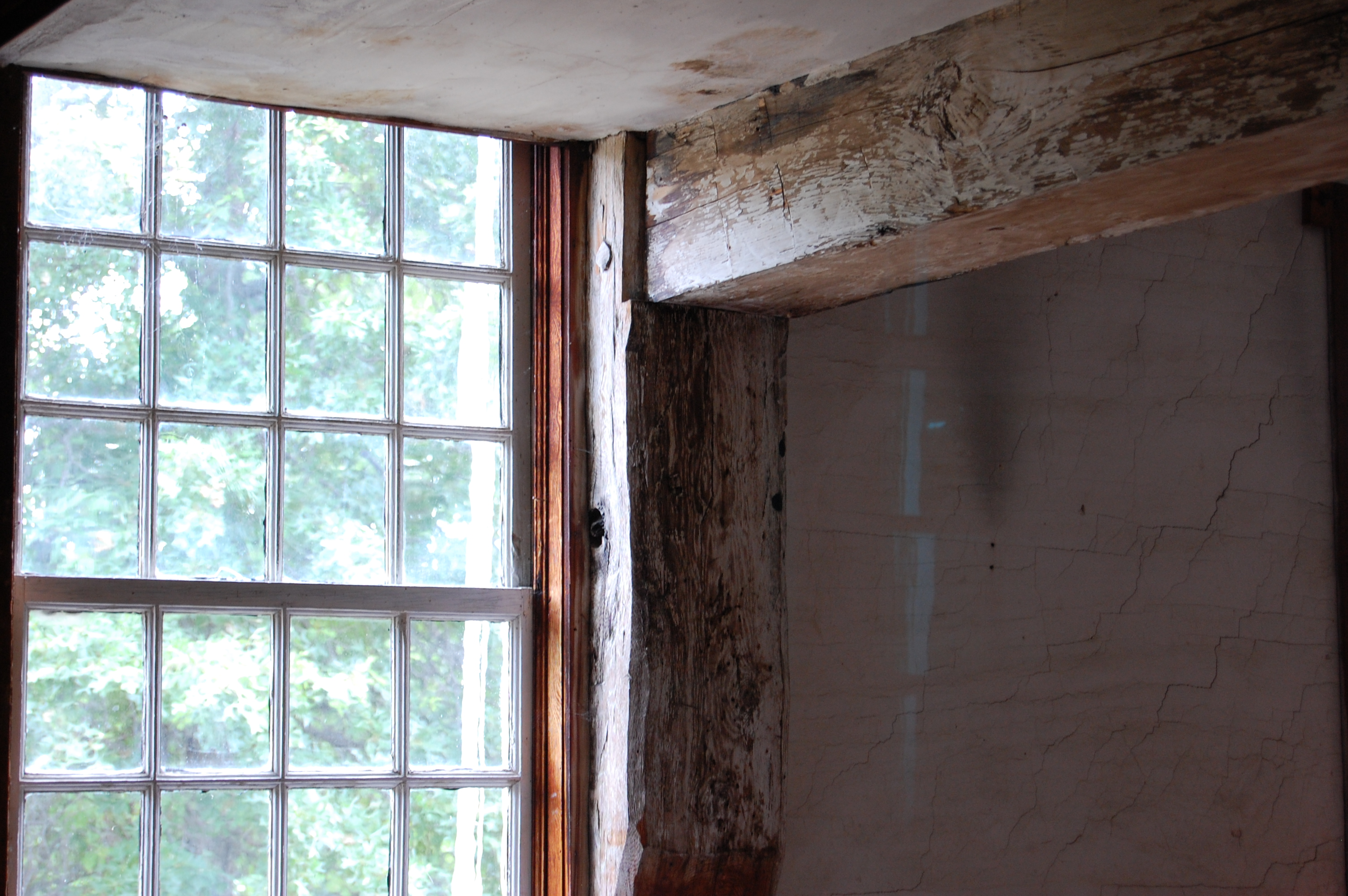
Interior of the colonial meeting house in Danville, New Hampshire
