= Gilsum, New Hampshire =

- Town
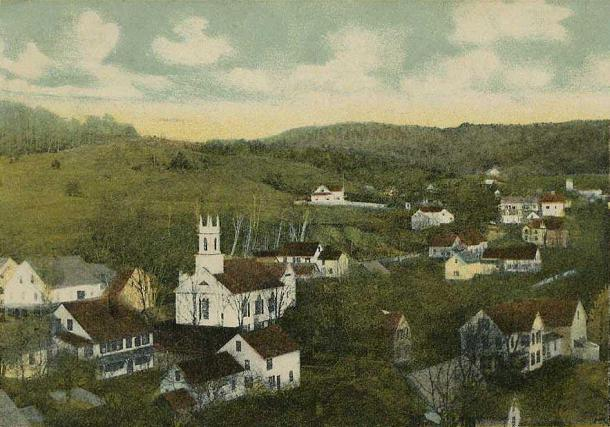
- Bird's-eye view in 1908

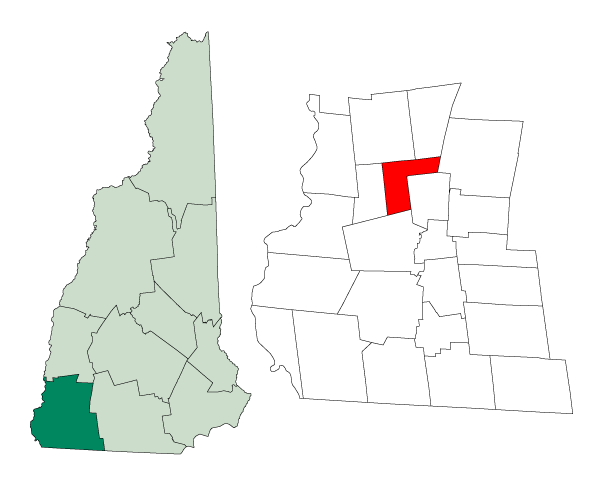
- Location in Cheshire County, New Hampshire
- Coordinates: 43°02′54″N 72°15′46″W
- Country: United States
- State: New Hampshire
- County: Cheshire
- Incorporated: 1763
- Villages: Gilsum; Lower Village

Area
  - Total: 16.69 sq mi (43.23 km^{2})
  - Land: 16.67 sq mi (43.17 km^{2})
  - Water: 0.023 sq mi (0.06 km^{2}) 0.13%
- Elevation: 912 ft (278 m)

Population (2020)
  - Total: 752
  - Density: 45/sq mi (17.4/km^{2})
- Time zone: UTC-5 (Eastern)
  - Summer (DST): UTC-4 (Eastern)
- ZIP code: 03448
- Area code: 603
- FIPS code: 33-29220
- GNIS feature ID: 873605
- Website: gilsum-nh.gov

Gilsum is a town in Cheshire County, New Hampshire, United States. The population was 752 at the 2020 census, and an estimated 792 in 2025. Home to Bear's Den Natural Area, Gilsum includes Gilsum Lower Village.

== History ==
The land was originally named "Boyle" after Richard Boyle, Earl of Burlington, when the land was granted by the Masonian Proprietors in 1752, but ongoing hostilities during the French and Indian War prevented settlement. When the grant lapsed, the town was rechartered by Governor Benning Wentworth on July 13, 1763, as Gilsum, in a portmanteau of the surnames of two proprietors, Samuel Gilbert and his son-in-law, Thomas Sumner. It was first settled in 1764 by Josiah Kilburn from Hebron, Connecticut.

The Ashuelot River provided water power for woolen mills. By 1859, when the population was 668, there was also a bobbin factory, a chair factory, and a tannery. Gilsum used to be a center for mining mica and feldspar. High-quality crystals, especially beryl, tourmaline, and quartz, can also be found. Today, Gilsum is headquarters to the W.S. Badger Company, makers of "balms, potions and natural remedies."

The town contains the Stone Arch Bridge, completed in 1863 with the highest vault (36 feet, 6 inches) of any mortarless bridge in New Hampshire. In 1989, it was added to the National Register.

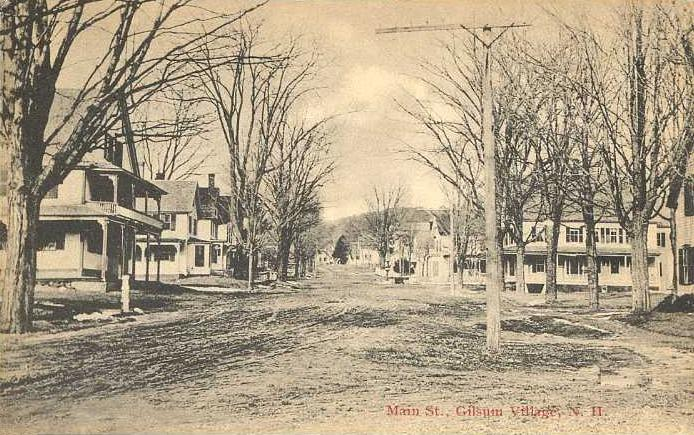
Main Street c. 1910

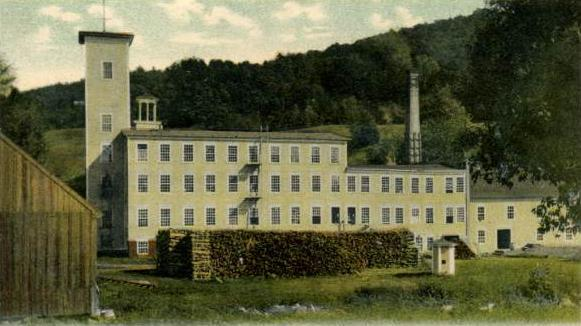
Woolen mill in 1911

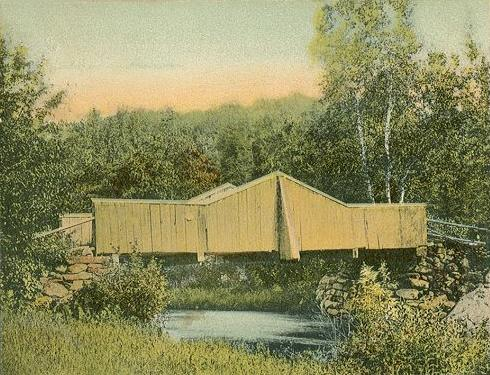
Polley Bridge in 1907

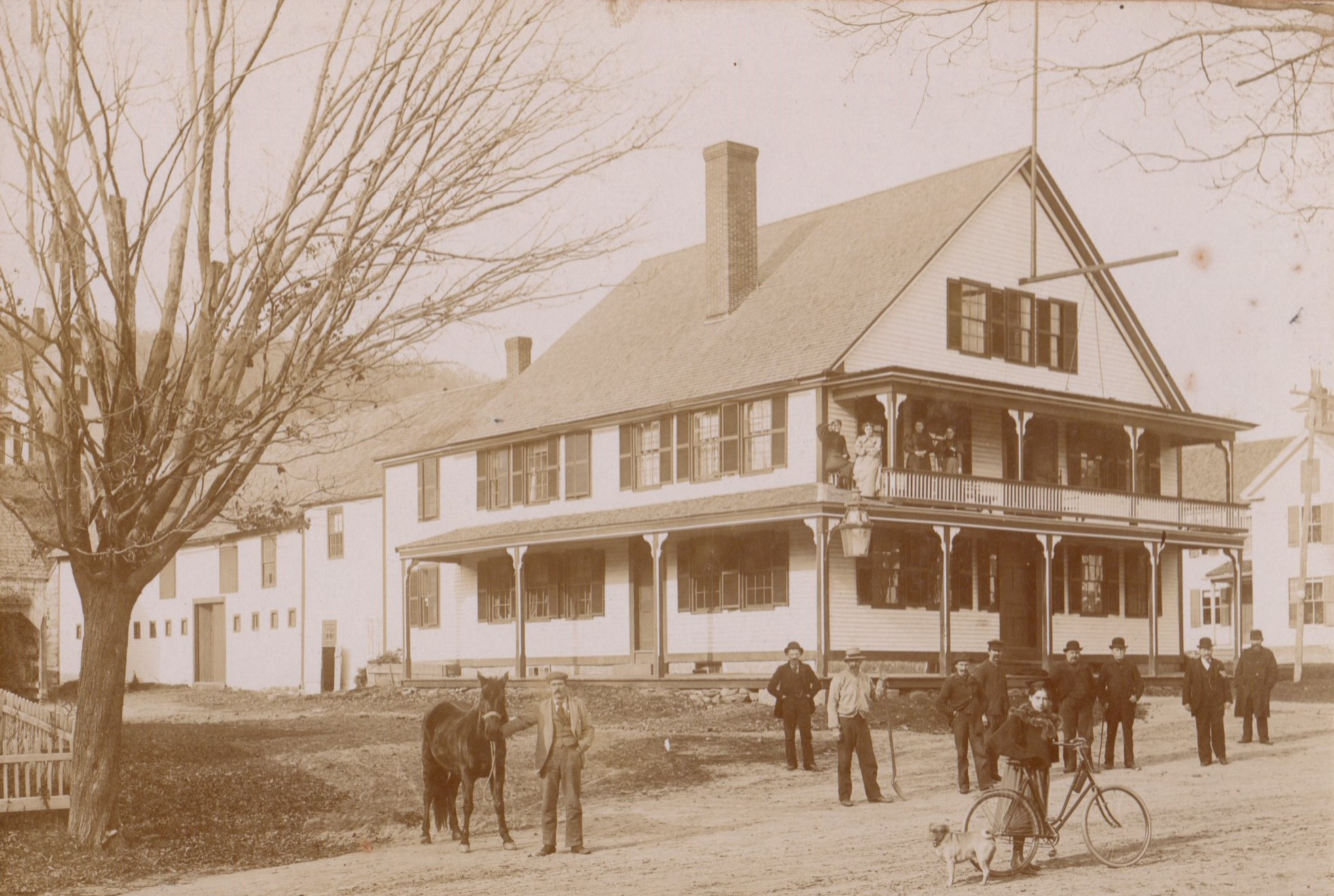
The Ashuelot Hotel c. 1896

== Geography ==
According to the United States Census Bureau, the town has a total area of 16.7 square miles (43.2 km^{2}), of which 0.02 square miles (0.06 km^{2}) are water, comprising 0.13% of the town. The highest point in Gilsum is an unnamed hill along the town's eastern boundary, where the elevation reaches 1,657 feet (505 m) above sea level. Gilsum is drained by the Ashuelot River and lies fully within the Connecticut River watershed.

The town is served by New Hampshire Route 10.

=== Adjacent municipalities ===
- Alstead (north)
- Marlow (northeast)
- Stoddard (east)
- Sullivan (east)
- Keene (south)
- Surry (west)

== Demographics ==
Historical population
| Census | Pop. | Note | %± |
|---|---|---|---|
| 1790 | 298 | | — |
| 1800 | 484 | | 62.4% |
| 1810 | 513 | | 6.0% |
| 1820 | 601 | | 17.2% |
| 1830 | 412 | | −31.4% |
| 1840 | 656 | | 59.2% |
| 1850 | 668 | | 1.8% |
| 1860 | 676 | | 1.2% |
| 1870 | 590 | | −12.7% |
| 1880 | 663 | | 12.4% |
| 1890 | 643 | | −3.0% |
| 1900 | 590 | | −8.2% |
| 1910 | 470 | | −20.3% |
| 1920 | 439 | | −6.6% |
| 1930 | 506 | | 15.3% |
| 1940 | 491 | | −3.0% |
| 1950 | 578 | | 17.7% |
| 1960 | 528 | | −8.7% |
| 1970 | 570 | | 8.0% |
| 1980 | 652 | | 14.4% |
| 1990 | 745 | | 14.3% |
| 2000 | 777 | | 4.3% |
| 2010 | 813 | | 4.6% |
| 2020 | 752 | | −7.5% |
| 2024 (est.) | 786 | | 4.5% |
U.S. Decennial Census

As of the census of 2000, there were 777 people, 310 households, and 220 families residing in the town. The population density was 46.6 inhabitants per square mile (18.0/km^{2}). There were 343 housing units at an average density of 20.6 per square mile (8.0/km^{2}). The racial makeup of the town was 98.46% White, 0.39% Native American, 0.13% Asian, and 1.03% from two or more races. Hispanic or Latino of any race were 0.51% of the population.

There were 310 households, out of which 26.5% had children under the age of 18 living with them, 58.7% were married couples living together, 8.7% had a female householder with no husband present, and 29.0% were non-families. 23.9% of all households were made up of individuals, and 6.5% had someone living alone who was 65 years of age or older. The average household size was 2.48 and the average family size was 2.90.

In the town, the population was spread out, with 22.3% under the age of 18, 5.0% from 18 to 24, 30.0% from 25 to 44, 31.9% from 45 to 64, and 10.8% who were 65 years of age or older. The median age was 41 years. For every 100 females, there were 98.2 males. For every 100 females age 18 and over, there were 104.1 males.

The median income for a household in the town was $43,359, and the median income for a family was $50,469. Males had a median income of $35,150 versus $24,205 for females. The per capita income for the town was $20,955. About 1.9% of families and 7.0% of the population were below the poverty line, including 1.3% of those under age 18 and 13.7% of those age 65 or over.

== Sites of interest ==
- Gilsum Historical Society Museum
- New Hampshire Historical Marker No. 168: Gilsum Stone Arch Bridge

== Notable people ==
- Lucy Mack (1775–1856), mother of the Latter Day Saint movement founder Joseph Smith
- Daniel Whitney (1795–1862), Wisconsin businessman, pioneer
