= Danville Meetinghouse =

Historic church in New Hampshire, United States

- U.S. National Register of Historic Places
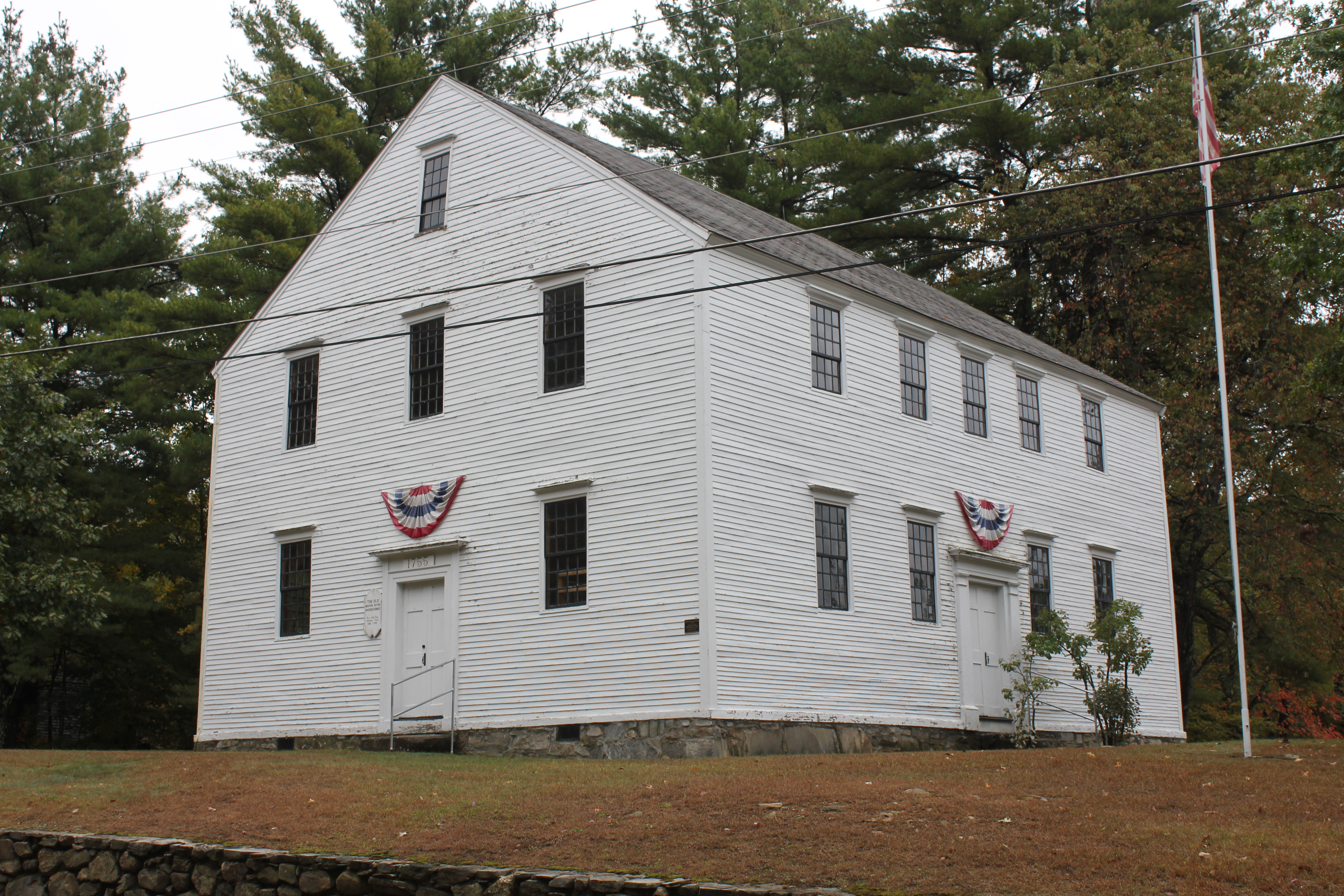

- Location within New Hampshire Location within the United States
- Location: N. Main St., Danville, New Hampshire
- Coordinates: 42°56′14″N 71°7′8″W
- Area: 0.3 acres (0.12 ha)
- Built: 1759
- NRHP reference No.: 82001876
- Added to NRHP: April 19, 1982

The Danville Meetinghouse (also known as The Hawke Meetinghouse) is a historic colonial meeting house on North Main Street (New Hampshire Route 111A) in Danville, New Hampshire. Construction on the building began in 1755 and was finished in 1760 when Danville (Hawke at the time) petitioned to form a town of its own, separate from Kingston. It is the oldest meetinghouse of original construction and least-altered in New Hampshire, with a remarkably well preserved interior. The building, now maintained by a local nonprofit organization, was added to the National Register of Historic Places in 1982.

== Description and history ==
The Danville Meetinghouse is located in a rural setting in northern Danville, on the east side of North Main Street. It is a 2 1/2-story wood-frame structure, with a gabled roof and clapboarded exterior. Entrances are located at the centers of the east, west, and south sides, with the principal entrance on the south. It is framed by pilasters and a simple entablature. The north wall has five bays, with the central one occupied by a pulpit window halfway between the two levels. The interior retains original box pews, with a raised pulpit and reading desk at the center of the north wall. The gallery level has slip pews, and a choir area on the south wall facing the pulpit.

The meeting house was built c. 1759-60 by local residents for what was then the west parish of Kingston, before it was separately incorporated, first as Hawke, then as Danville. Many of its windows were enlarged slightly c. 1800, and the building also received some Federal style exterior decoration. Its use for religious services declined with the construction of a church in 1832, and town meetings were held here regularly until 1887, when the present town hall was completed. Its box pews were removed in the 1860s and placed in storage; they were returned to their original places in 1936.

The building is of significant regional architectural importance, for its age and state of preservation. Its well-preserved interior provides a major view into the architecture of older (no longer extant) meeting houses, which it is documented to resemble.

== See also ==
- National Register of Historic Places listings in Rockingham County, New Hampshire
- New Hampshire Historical Marker No. 169: Hawke Meeting House
