= Dan Itse =

American politician

New Hampshire State Representative from Rockingham County
- In office January 2001 – 2018

Personal details
- Born: May 21, 1958 (age 68) San Francisco, California, USA
- Party: Republican
- Spouse: Lisa Mullins Itse
- Children: David, Jessica, Eric, Ariel, and Jarrod Itse
- Education: Worcester Polytechnic Institute
- Occupation: Chemical engineer

Daniel C. Itse (born May 21, 1958) is an American politician who was a conservative Republican member of the New Hampshire House of Representatives from 2001 to 2018.

A native of San Francisco, California, Itse is a professional engineer who resides in Fremont, New Hampshire.

In 2009, Itse introduced a "state sovereignty" resolution based on the Kentucky Resolutions; similar resolutions were introduced in some other states.
