= Elm Farm (Danville, New Hampshire) =

Historic house in New Hampshire, United States

- U.S. National Register of Historic Places
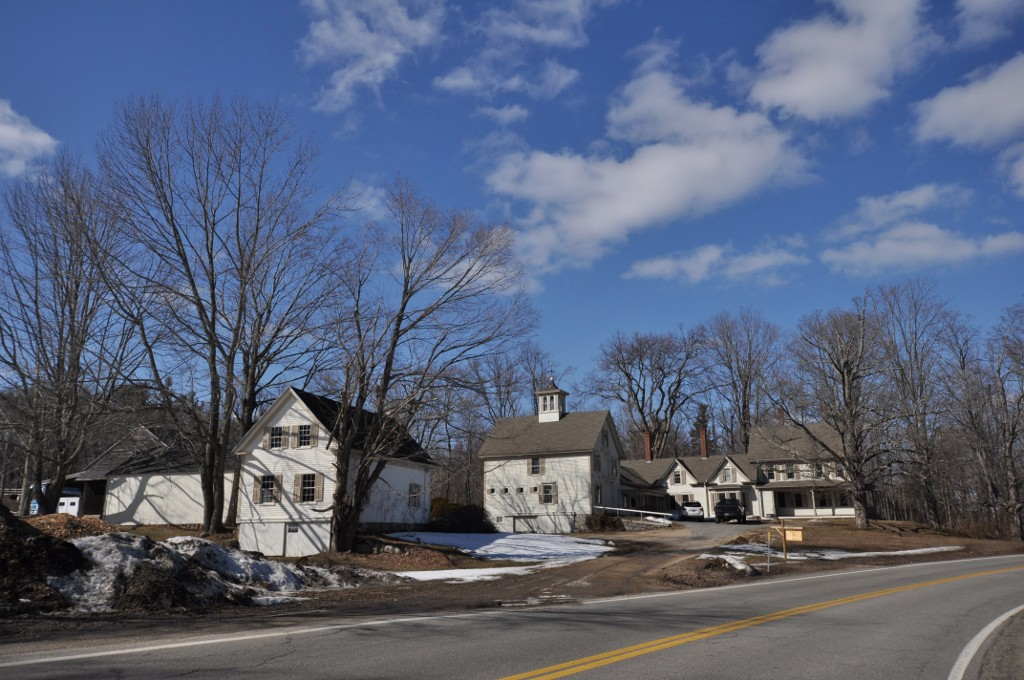

- Location within New Hampshire Location within the United States
- Location: 599 Main St., Danville, New Hampshire
- Coordinates: 42°56′58″N 71°8′0″W
- Area: 85 acres (34 ha)
- Built: 1840
- Built by: Sargent, Samuel, Jr.
- Architectural style: Greek Revival, Gothic Revival, Transitional
- NRHP reference No.: 88000191
- Added to NRHP: January 22, 1988

Elm Farm, alsk known as the Sargent Farm, is a historic farm property at 599 Main Street (New Hampshire Route 111A) in Danville, New Hampshire. Established about 1835, it has been in agricultural use since then, with many of its owners also engaged in small commercial or industrial pursuits on the side. The main farmhouse is one of the town's best examples of Gothic Revival architecture. The property was listed on the National Register of Historic Places in 1988.

== Description and history ==
Elm Farm is located in rural northern Danville, on the west side of Main Street just south of its junction with Beach Plain Road. The property consists of 85 acres (34 ha) of land, stretching in a relatively narrow strip all the way west to the town line with Sandown. The westernmost portions of the property consists of woods and swamp, while the 30 acres (12 ha) immediately west of the road are given over to crops, pasture, and the farmstead. The farmstead is a typical 19th-century New England connected construction, including a 2 1/2-story farmhouse with Greek Revival and Gothic Revival features, which is attached by a series of two ells to a three-story stable. South of this grouping is a set of outbuildings, including a second stable, cow barn, carriage barn, equipment shed, and hen house. The farmhouse is distinctive in the town as one of its only examples of Gothic architecture.

The property has been in agricultural use since at least 1835, when Samuel Sargent Jr. purchased part of the 7th lot of the town's original land grants made in 1760. In addition to farming the land, Bailey manufactured barrels and chairs. His son Bailey operated a variety of businesses, including a cider mill, and offered stabling services. Bailey's son Alfred ran a small printing operation here, and his other son Herbert repaired clocks. These businesses were typically conducted out of the second ell of the farmstead, which may have been built specifically for such non-agricultural uses.

== See also ==
- National Register of Historic Places listings in Rockingham County, New Hampshire
