= Danville, New Hampshire =

Town in New Hampshire, United States

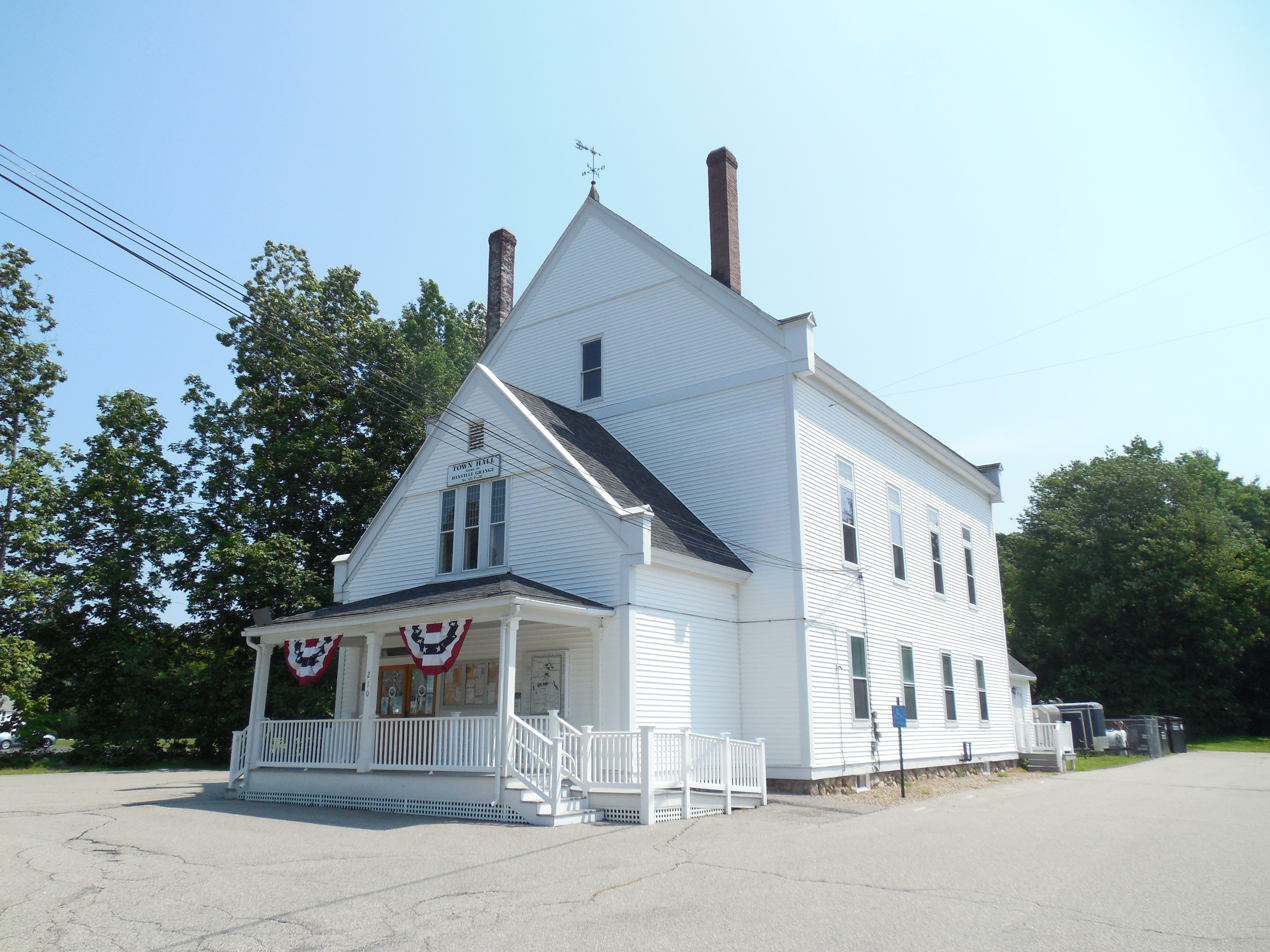
- Town hall

- Seal

- Location in Rockingham County and the state of New Hampshire.
- Coordinates: 42°55′42″N 71°07′16″W
- Country: United States
- State: New Hampshire
- County: Rockingham
- Incorporated: 1760
- Villages: Danville; North Danville; South Danville

Government
  - Type: Town Meeting (SB2)

Area
  - Total: 11.83 sq mi (30.64 km^{2})
  - Land: 11.65 sq mi (30.17 km^{2})
  - Water: 0.18 sq mi (0.47 km^{2}) 1.53%
- Elevation: 171 ft (52 m)

Population (2020)
  - Total: 4,408
  - Density: 378/sq mi (146.1/km^{2})
- Time zone: UTC-5 (Eastern)
  - Summer (DST): UTC-4 (Eastern)
- ZIP code: 03819
- Area code: 603
- FIPS code: 33-17140
- GNIS feature ID: 873575
- Website: www.townofdanville.org

Danville is a town in Rockingham County, New Hampshire, United States. The population was 4,408 at the 2020 census. Danville is part of the Timberlane Regional School District, with students attending Danville Elementary School, Timberlane Regional Middle School, and Timberlane Regional High School.

== History ==
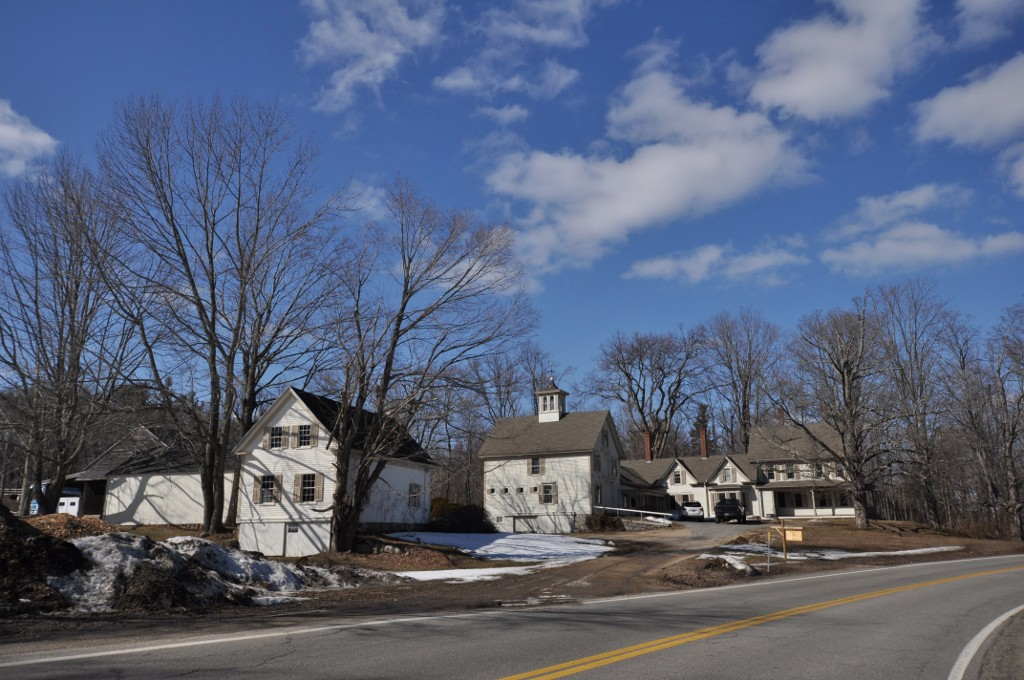
Elm Farm

In 1694 the parish of Kingstown (now Kingston) was incorporated, and it included the area known as "Hawke" as the westerly part of the parish. There were some families that lived in this region as early as the mid-1600s, but the first recorded settlements were about 1735. The meeting house in Kingstown was quite a distance for the residents of the westerly part of the parish to travel. Travel through this part of town was on roads which were little more than footpaths or bridleways that led from farm to farm. The residents of this westerly part of town built their own meeting house (the Old Meeting House) in 1755 and petitioned the Governor on January 2, 1760, to be set apart and to form their own parish. The petition was granted on February 22, 1760, and Hawke was incorporated. They sold pews in the Old Meeting House on June 23, 1760.

The Tuckertown smallpox epidemic, one of the most memorable and saddest events in Hawke's history, occurred in the winter of 1781–1782. The Reverend John Page willingly went to the "pest house" to care for those afflicted, only to eventually succumb himself.

As the American Revolution ended, farming continued to be the primary livelihood, although the industrial age was slowly moving into rural Hawke. By 1828–1829 there were eight mills for various purposes known to exist. Travel was becoming more important, and from 1790 well into the mid-19th century the town allocated many sums of money for road building and repair. In 1800 it was the practice for a road builder (District Highway Surveyor, the predecessor to our road agents of today) to be granted authority to tax those the road would benefit. The tax was based on the amount of land owned as well as personal wealth. A person was allowed to work off the tax by providing physical labor or oxen and equipment to help with the road construction. In 1833, a warrant provided for "a new highway in the south part of town" that caused some controversy among the townsfolk, but was ultimately completed in 1835.

At the 1836 Town Meeting the original town name of "Hawke" (for the British Admiral Edward Hawke) was changed to "Danville". No definitive explanation has been discovered for the reason for the change or explanation for also considering the name "China".

In the decades leading up to the Civil War, Danville typified rural New England life. Most residents followed agricultural pursuits, although the keeping of orchards and animals began to decline. The impact of the Industrial Revolution was to make its mark especially in the area of home industries and small businesses. Sawmills, cooperages, blacksmithing and small home shoe shops provided extra income for farmers of Danville. Wagons loaded with casks and barrels left town for the port cities of Newburyport, Gloucester, and Salem, Massachusetts, while town cordwainers complemented the shoe industry of Haverhill, Massachusetts, by sewing and lining the shoes that were eventually trimmed, dressed and packed in the nearby city.

Religion, which had been a prime factor in the establishment of Hawke, continued to influence the people. The only two churches in town were constructed in this time period. The Baptist Church was first organized as the Church of Christ in 1820. In 1832 the Free Will Baptist Society was organized, and Deacon Thomas Colby was authorized to build a church on the corner of Main Street and Kingston Road that was later moved to its present location next to Town Hall on Main Street. In 1850 the Union Religious Society built the only other church, other than the Meeting House, on Beach Plain Road.

== Geography ==
According to the United States Census Bureau, the town has a total area of 11.8 square miles (30.6 km^{2}), of which 11.7 square miles (30.2 km^{2}) are land and 0.2 square miles (0.5 km^{2}) are water, comprising 1.53% of the town. The highest named summit in Danville is Rock Rimmon Hill, with an elevation greater than 350 feet (110 m) above sea level on the town's eastern border. An unnamed hill on the town's western border also tops 350 feet. The southern two-thirds of Danville lies within the Merrimack River watershed, and the northern third is in the Piscataqua River (Coastal) watershed.

=== Adjacent municipalities ===
- Fremont (north)
- Kingston (east)
- Hampstead (south)
- Sandown (west)

== Demographics ==
Historical population
Census	Pop.	Note	%±
1790	420		—
1840	538		—
1850	614		14.1%
1860	629		2.4%
1870	548		−12.9%
1880	613		11.9%
1890	666		8.6%
1900	615		−7.7%
1910	517		−15.9%
1920	463		−10.4%
1930	406		−12.3%
1940	457		12.6%
1950	508		11.2%
1960	605		19.1%
1970	924		52.7%
1980	1,318		42.6%
1990	2,534		92.3%
2000	4,023		58.8%
2010	4,387		9.0%
2020	4,408		0.5%
U.S. Decennial Census

As of the census of 2000, there were 4,023 people, 1,428 households, and 1,122 families residing in the town. The population density was 343.6 inhabitants per square mile (132.7/km^{2}). There were 1,479 housing units at an average density of 126.3 per square mile (48.8/km^{2}). The racial makeup of the town was 97.59% White, 0.57% African American, 0.27% Native American, 0.35% Asian, 0.02% Pacific Islander, 0.30% from other races, and 0.89% from two or more races. Hispanic or Latino of any race were 0.85% of the population.

There were 1,428 households, out of which 42.3% had children under the age of 18 living with them, 68.3% were married couples living together, 6.8% had a female householder with no husband present, and 21.4% were non-families. 16.5% of all households were made up of individuals, and 4.1% had someone living alone who was 65 years of age or older. The average household size was 2.82 and the average family size was 3.18.

In the town, the population was spread out, with 29.2% under the age of 18, 4.4% from 18 to 24, 37.0% from 25 to 44, 22.2% from 45 to 64, and 7.1% who were 65 years of age or older. The median age was 35 years. For every 100 females, there were 104.7 males. For every 100 females age 18 and over, there were 101.5 males.

The median income for a household in the town was $57,287, and the median income for a family was $63,239. Males had a median income of $45,122 versus $29,351 for females. The per capita income for the town was $22,152. About 3.2% of families and 4.0% of the population were below the poverty line, including 5.5% of those under age 18 and 8.4% of those age 65 or over.

== Transportation ==
Two New Hampshire state routes cross Danville.

- NH 111 crosses southern Danville, connecting to Hampstead to Kingston.
- NH 111A begins in southern Danville at the point where NH 111 enters town from Hampstead, and heads north along Main Street. It leaves at the town's northern border with Fremont.
