= Prides Crossing =

Neighborhood in Beverly, Massachusetts

Coordinates: 42°33′33.68″N 70°49′31.72″W

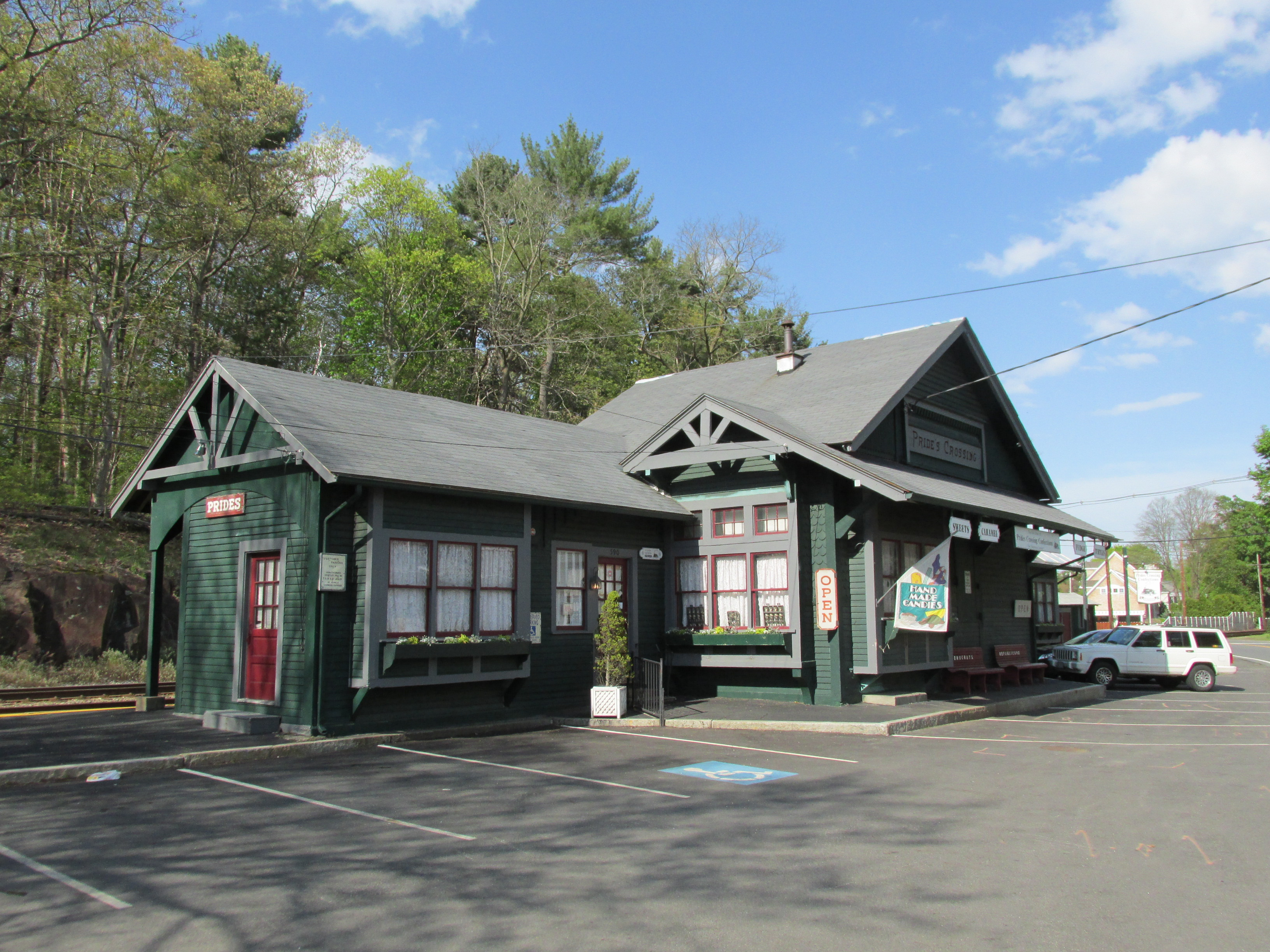
Prides Crossing station in 2013

Prides Crossing is a neighborhood of the city of Beverly, Massachusetts in the North Shore region. It is bordered to the east by Beverly Farms, and to the west by the Beverly Cove areas of Beverly.

== History ==
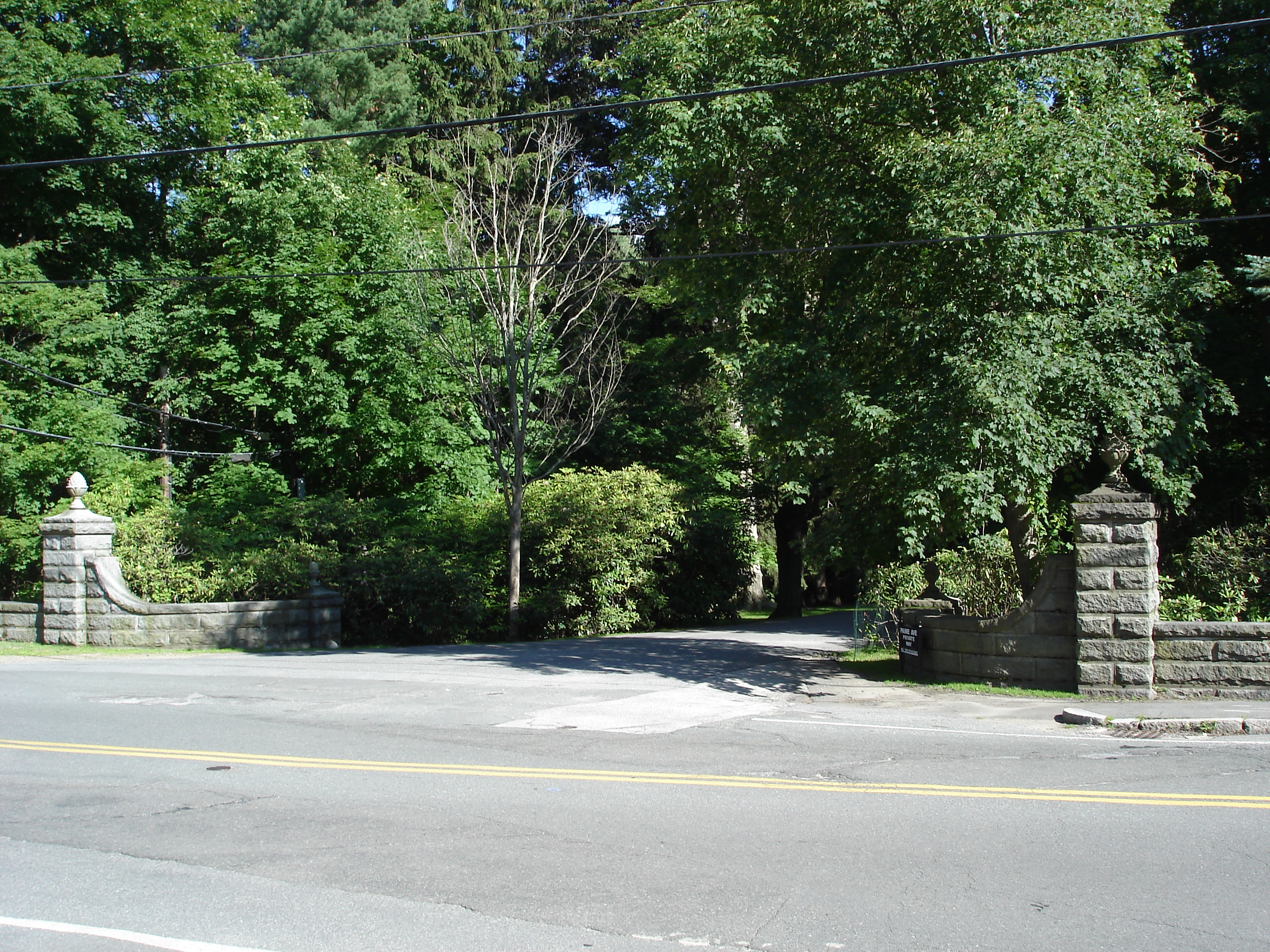
Entrance to Paine Avenue

The name is associated with John Pride – supposedly a nephew of Thomas Pride – who was granted land in the area in 1636. In the late 1800s and early 1900s grand mansions were built as summer "cottages' for wealthy business magnates. Henry Clay Frick, who made his fortune in steel (Carnegie Steel) was among the best known of these summer residents. He built "Eagle Rock", located between Hale Street and the Atlantic Ocean. Edward Carelton Swift, at one time the owner of the largest meat packing operation in the U.S. built a mansion, "Swiftmoor" on Paine Avenue in Prides Crossing. Eleonora "Eleo" Sears, a flamboyant female socialite and world class tennis player, owned a residence that still exists where Paine Avenue and West Beach meet.

Wealthy residents were known to travel to Prides Crossing in their private railroad cars, disembarking at the Prides Crossing station, located on Hale Street across from the entrance gates to Paine Avenue. (Some, including Frick and Moore, had private sidings for their cars.) MBTA Commuter Rail service to the station lasted until 2020; the structure was converted to commercial use decades prior.

On August 11, 1981, a Boston & Maine passenger train operated for the MBTA collided head-on with a Boston & Maine freight train near Prides Crossing, killing four people.

== Notable former residents ==
- Frederick Ayer, industrialist
- Jerome Napoleon Bonaparte II, French-American military officer
- Henry Clay Frick, steel magnate
- William Loeb III, newspaper publisher known for conservative views
- Alice Roosevelt Longworth, writer and socialite
- Loring family:
  - Augustus Peabody Loring Jr. (1885–1951), legal writer
  - Charles Greely Loring III (1881–1966), architect based in Boston, son of the Civil War general
  - Charles Greely Loring Jr. (1828–1902), Union Army general during the Civil War, later director of Boston's Museum of Fine Arts
  - Charles Greely Loring Sr. (1794–1867), lawyer and politician based in Boston, father of the Civil War general
  - Katharine Peabody Loring (1849–1943), historian
  - William Loring (1851–1930), Massachusetts Supreme Judicial Court justice
- William Henry Moore, judge and financier
- Norman Prince, co-founder of the Lafayette Escadrille
- Richard D. Sears, tennis player
- Edwin C. Swift, industrialist
