= Charles Loring =

Charles Loring may refer to:

- Charles Loring (judge) (1873–1961), chief justice of the Minnesota Supreme Court
- Charles Greely Loring (architect) (1881–1966), American architect based in Boston, son of the Civil War general
- Charles Greely Loring (general) (1828–1902), Union Army general during the Civil War, later director of Boston's Museum of Fine Arts
- Charles Greely Loring (lawyer) (1794–1867), American lawyer and politician based in Boston, father of the Civil War general
- Charles Harding Loring (1828–1907), American mechanical engineer
- Charles J. Loring Jr. (1918–1952), United States Air Force officer and Medal of Honor recipient
- Charles M. Loring (1833–1922), American businessman, miller, father of Minneapolis park system

== See also ==
- Loring (surname)
