= Jane L. Gray =

Jane L. Gray may refer to:

- Jane Lewers Gray (1796–1871), Northern Ireland-born American poet and hymnwriter
- Jane Loring Gray (1821–1909), American editor
- Lady Jane Gray, misspelling of Lady Jane Grey

== See also ==
- Jane Gray (disambiguation)
