= Katharine Peabody Loring =

American educator

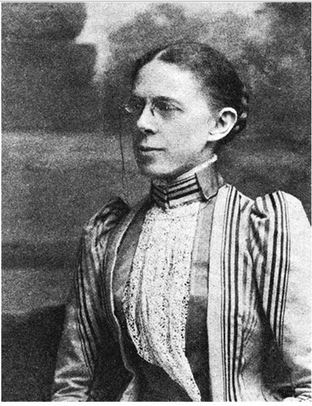
- Loring in the 1870s
- Born: May 21, 1849; Beverly, Massachusetts
- Died: August 16, 1943 (aged 94)
- Occupation: Educator

Katharine Peabody Loring RRC (May 21, 1849 – August 16, 1943) was an American educator. She was head of the history department at the Society to Encourage Studies at Home, the first correspondence school in the United States, where she developed a lifelong companionship with diarist Alice James. She was also a trustee of the Beverly Public Library in Beverly, Massachusetts, and president of the Beverly Historical Society from 1918 to 1941.

== Early life ==
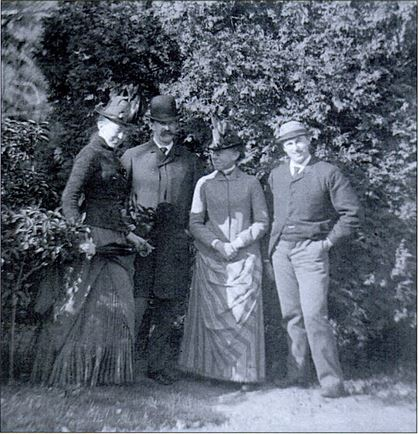
From left to right: Katharine Peabody, William Caleb, Louisa Putnam and Augustus Peabody Loring.

Katharine Peabody Loring was born in Beverly, Massachusetts, on May 21, 1849, to Caleb William Loring, president of the Plymouth Cordage Company, and Elizabeth Peabody. Her name was occasionally misspelled as Katherine in many letters. The Loring family were descendants of Thomas Loring, who came to Hingham, Massachusetts from Devonshire, England, and they were influential in Massachusetts. Her grandfather Charles Greely Loring was a landowner in Prides Crossing, Beverly, Massachusetts, which was passed on to Loring's father, Caleb, who built a new house in 1852. The family often moved between the Prides Crossing home, Burnside, and the family house in Boston until 1872, when they all moved permanently to Beverly.

In the spring of 1888, while travelling to Florida and South Carolina with her father and sister, Loring met Annie Adams Fields and Sarah Orne Jewett, with whom she was a lifelong friend.

== As educator ==
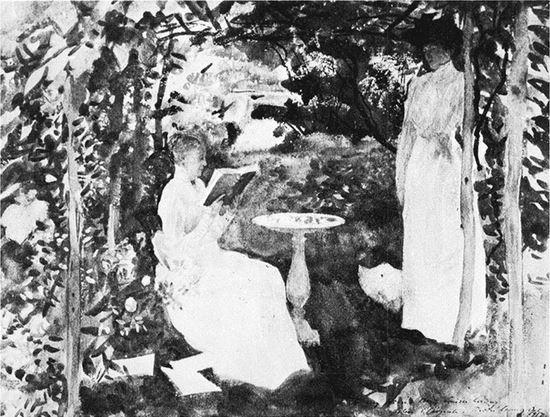
Katharine (reading) and Louisa Loring in Study in Greens, by John Singer Sargent, inscribed "To my friend Miss Louisa Loring, Prides Crossing, October, 1917." The original was destroyed by a fire in 1969.

Despite lacking formal education, Loring was an avid reader and travelled widely, unusual for women at the time. Both her brothers, William Caleb Loring, a justice of Massachusetts Supreme Judicial Court, and Augustus Peabody Loring, a Republican politician and member of the Constitutional Convention of 1917, often consulted with her.

Because of her interest in politics and foreign affairs, Loring helped Anna Ticknor found the Society to Encourage Studies at Home in 1873 to contribute to women's education. She became head of the history department, the largest of the society's departments, a position she held for 20 years. Her sister, Louisa Putnam Loring, also helped out at the school. Louisa had tuberculosis and often had to be taken care of by Loring. Loring and her sister were involved in the American Red Cross locally together. Louisa was also a good friend of John Singer Sargent who took a watercolor of Louisa and Katharine Loring, Study in Green, destroyed by fire in 1969.

In 1871 Katharine Loring, together with Julia Ward Howe, founded the Saturday Morning Club, an organization for women's communal and intellectual growth in Boston. In addition to women's organizations, Loring was also a key stakeholder for the establishment of the Beverly Public Library, of which she was also a trustee; other organizations she was involved with were: the Mayflower Club in Boston, the Royal Red Cross during World War I, the Women's Education Association, the Harvard Annex (a private program for the instruction of women by Harvard faculty), the Beverly Improvement Society and the Massachusetts Library Club. She was also president of the Beverly Historical Society for 23 years, from 1918 to 1941, advocating the acquisition of the John Balch House and the John Hale House, both properties currently in the National Register of Historic Places.

== Influence on Alice James ==
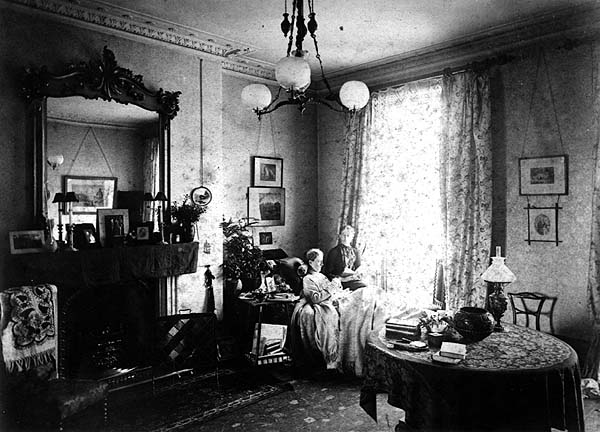
Alice James (reclining) and Katharine Peabody Loring, taken at the Royal Leamington Spa (England), c. 1890

Loring and James first met in December 1873. In 1875, James joined the Society and taught history alongside Loring, who was the head of the department. In the summer of 1879, Alice James wrote to Sara Darwin:

I wish you could know Katharine Loring [...] she is a most wonderful being. She has all the mere brute superiority which distinguishes man from woman combined with all the distinctively feminine virtues. There is nothing she cannot do from hewing wood and drawing water to driving runaway horses and educating all the women in North America.

Loring and James journeyed to the White Mountains in New Hampshire in the spring of 1880. During the journey they also visited Lake Winnipesaukee, Newport, Rhode Island, and Cape Cod. On May 21, 1881, Loring and James left for England, arriving on May 30. Initially staying in Richmond at the Star and Garter Hotel, on July 18 they moved temporarily to Kew to the house of Asa Gray, a Harvard botanist, and Jane Loring Gray, Loring's aunt. The Kew arrangements were unsuitable to James' needs, and they relocated to Sevenoaks at the end of July, and London, at 10 Clarges Street, in mid-August. In the beginning of September, with Henry James leaving for Scotland, James and Loring moved to his rooms at 4 Bolton Street. At the end of the month, they were back to the United States. Loring and James moved to England in 1884. James died on March 6, 1892.

According to Leon Edel, Henry James loosely based his characters Olive Chancellor and Verena Tarrant in The Bostonians upon Loring and his sister.

== Later life ==
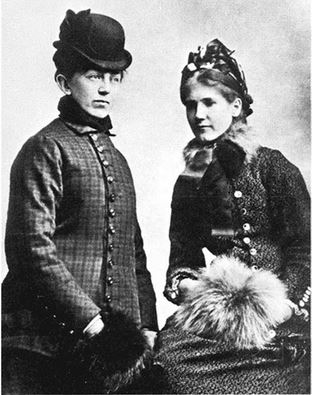
Katharine Peabody Loring (left) and unidentified friend, c. 1890

At the beginning of the 20th century, when the nouveau riche arrived to Beverly from New York, they started to buy the old-Bostonian family mansions. Henry Clay Frick proposed to Katharine Loring to buy their Prides Crossing property, to which Loring replied, "Goodness! what on earth would I do with a million dollars?".

The Loring sisters participated in humanitarian activities throughout World War I. They also did relief work after the Great Salem fire of 1914 and were active in combatting tuberculosis: Louisa Loring was the founder and president of the Aiken, South Carolina Sanitarium, director of the Beverly Hospital, and founder of the Anti-Tuberculosis Society in Beverly. In 1917, Katharine helped compile the Loring family genealogy and in 1932 she wrote The Earliest Summer Residents of the North Shore and Their Houses.

Always low-sighted, Katharine Loring became completely blind in old age, and taught herself braille. She died at 94 years old, on August 16, 1943. She was buried with her sister Louisa, who died earlier in 1924, at Mount Auburn Cemetery in Cambridge, Massachusetts.
