= Charles Greely Loring =

Charles Greely Loring may refer to:

- Charles Greely Loring (architect) (1881–1966), American architect based in Boston, son of the Civil War general
- Charles Greely Loring (general) (1828–1902), Union Army general during the Civil War, later director of Boston's Museum of Fine Arts
- Charles Greely Loring (lawyer) (1794–1867), American lawyer and politician based in Boston, father of the Civil War general

== See also ==
- Loring (surname)
