= Beverly Historical Society =

Coordinates: 42°32′45.1″N 70°52′47.6″W

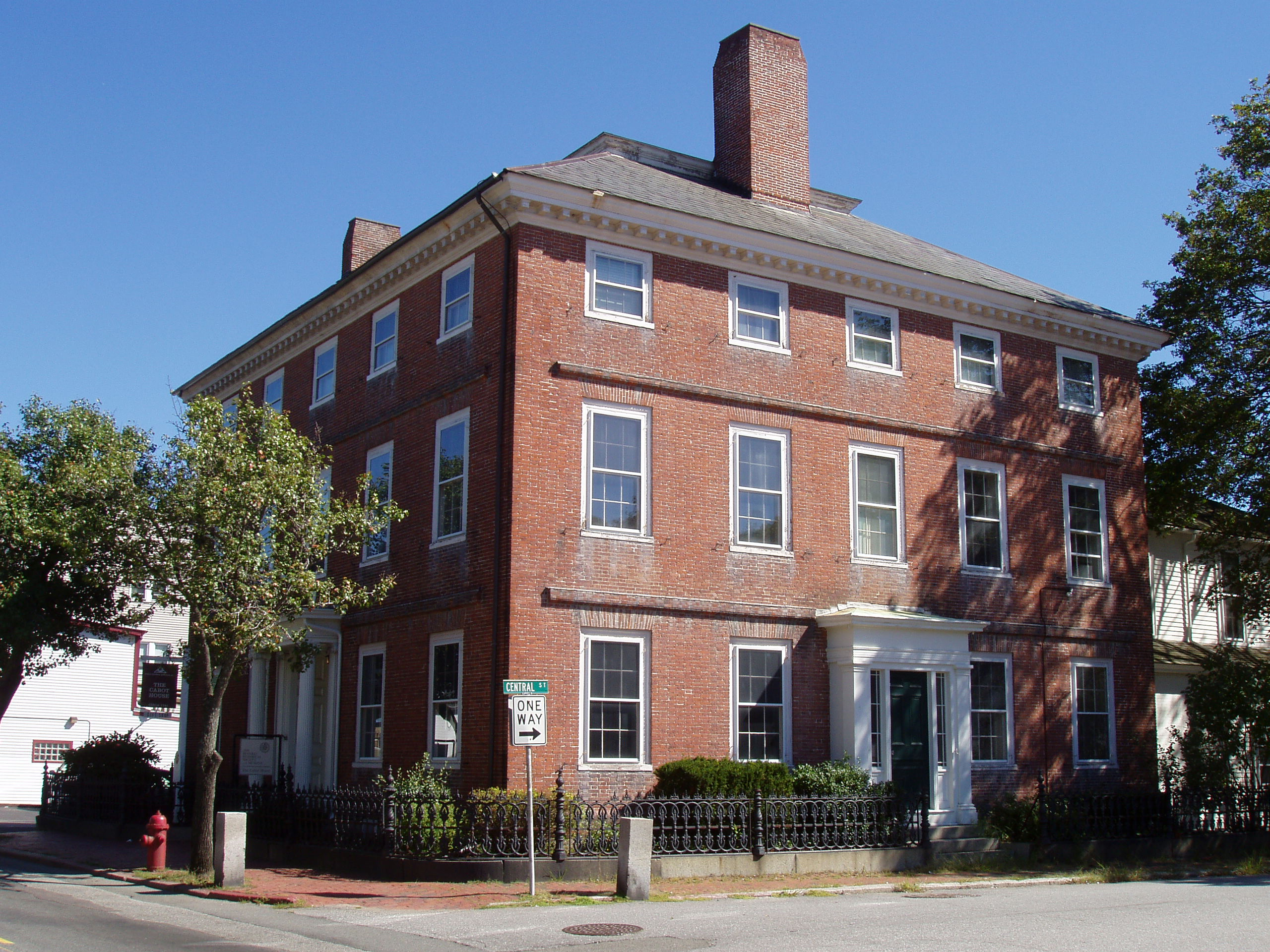
John Cabot House

The Beverly Historical Society, located in Beverly, Massachusetts, was founded in 1891, and its headquarters is the 1781 John Cabot House, which has two floors of museum exhibits. The collections have grown to more than 750,000 objects, including manuscripts, books, photographs, maps, decorative arts, and other artifacts related to the history of Beverly and the North Shore. The Society acquired two 17th-century properties in the 1930s, the John Balch House and the John Hale House, which it opens to the public for guided tours.

Throughout its history, the Society has collected, preserved and interpreted Beverly history, offering programs to the general public, as well as to teachers and students. Volunteers are critically important to the vitality and success of the Beverly Historical Society; contributed hours in 2008 exceeded 4800. In order to meet the needs of a diverse and changing constituency, the Society is focused on digitizing our collections and offering more services online to increase access to the collections, as well as increasing the amount of free programming offered each year.

The Society's collections include manuscripts, books, photographs, maps, ephemera, decorative arts, and other artifacts related to the history of Beverly and the North Shore of Massachusetts.

== The Walker Transportation Collection ==
The Walker Transportation Collection was given to the Society in 1969 by Laurence Breed Walker. Focused on all modes of transportation, it is primarily a document and image collection, with a small number of automobile and train models.

From an age dominated by horse power and wagons to our present period overshadowed by supersonic jet aircraft and sports utility-vehicles, the Walker Transportation Collection has something to captivate anyone’s attention. If it moved within, around, or above New England; the Collection most likely has a photo of it! Even for those things that didn’t actually move — but are closely related to a transportation mode — a photograph or pamphlet probably exists in our files: train depots, grand resort hotels, motels, drive-ins, theatres, airports, gas stations, fire departments, train depots, car barns, garages, bridges, and diners. Come explore!

Since 1969, The Walker Transportation Collection has served the interest of the researcher, student, transportation buff, and casual visitor alike – supplying photos, duplications, and other materials at nominal cost. With thousands of photos and slides, hundreds of books and periodicals, and scores of artifacts and models to examine, the Collection offers a major source for discovering New England’s ways of transporting its people and their goods.

== See also ==
- List of historical societies in Massachusetts
