= Jane Gray =

Jane Gray may refer to:

== People ==
- Lady Jane Gray, misspelling of Lady Jane Grey, briefly Queen of England and Ireland in 1553
- Jane Gray (stained glass artist) (1931–2024), British stained glass artist
- Jane Gray (supercentenarian) (1901–2014), Scottish Australian supercentenarian
- Jane Gray (broadcaster) (1896–1984), English-born female broadcaster in Canadian radio
- Jane Lewers Gray (1796–1871), Northern Ireland-born American poet and hymnwriter
- Jane Loring Gray (1821–1909), American editor
- Nellie Jane Gray (1924–2012), American anti-abortion activist
- Jane Gray Muskie (1927–2004), spouse of Edmund Muskie, 1968 Democratic vice-presidential nominee
- Jane Gray Nelson (born 1951), American politician in Texas
- Alice Jane Gray Perkins (1865–1948), American writer and teacher

== Other uses ==
- Jane Gray (schooner), a ship that sank in 1898 while traveling between Seattle and Kotzebue Sound

== See also ==
- Jane Grey (disambiguation)
- Jean Grey, a fictional superhero by Marvel Comics
