= Henry Wajda =

American Thoroughbred horse racing jockey

Personal information
- Nickname: Hammerin' Hank
- Born: November 27, 1934 Newmarket, New Hampshire, U.S.
- Died: July 29, 1973 (aged 38) Methuen, Massachusetts, U.S.
- Resting place: Calvary Cemetery, Newmarket, New Hampshire
- Occupation: Jockey

Horse racing career
- Sport: Horse racing
- Career winnings: $6 million+
- Career wins: 2224

Honours
- Henry Wajda Memorial Handicap at Rockingham Park; New England Racing Hall of Fame (2011)

Memorials
- New Hampshire Historical Marker No. 290

Henry Frank Wajda (Note: Polish: [ˈvajda], pronounced as "Vaida".) (November 27, 1934 – July 29, 1973) was an American Thoroughbred horse racing jockey who won over 2,200 races and was a leading jockey at New England tracks.

== Biography ==
Wajda was born in 1934 in Newmarket, New Hampshire. Prior to his career as a jockey, he worked in a shoe factory in his hometown. By 1954, he was riding Thoroughbreds as an apprentice at Laurel Park in Maryland. By 1957, he was riding at Rockingham Park in New Hampshire and had picked up the nickname "Hammerin' Hank". In October 1957, while riding at Suffolk Downs in Massachusetts, Wajda twice won five races in a single day, each time winning four races consecutively.

On September 6, 1958, Wajda set a world record at Rockingham Park; riding Mark Antony, he covered 1 mile and 70 yards (1.04 mi; 1.67 km) in 1:39 1/5, besting the prior record by 1/5 of a second.

On June 30, 1960, while riding Lusty Andy at Suffolk Downs, Wajda pulled fellow jockey Anthony DeSpirito back onto Color Bearer after DeSpirito had been knocked off his saddle in the first turn and was clinging to his mount by one hand and had a foot caught in a stirrup. DeSpirito credited Wajda with saving his life. For his bravery, Wajda received a commemorative watch from the president of Suffolk Downs, and honors from the New England Turf Writers and New York Turf Writers organizations.

In 1961, Wajda's annual income was estimated at $40,000 ($430,958 in 2025). That year, he missed five weeks of riding after suffering a shoulder injury in a race at Lincoln Downs in Rhode Island. In June 1962, Wajda was thrown from horses twice in one day at Suffolk Downs—once in a race, and then again prior to the next race—but was not injured. In 1963, he was reportedly the highest-paid professional athlete in New Hampshire. That season, he won 73 races in 42 days at Suffolk Downs.

Wajda died in 1973, as the result of a racing accident at Rockingham Park. Riding Zabush on July 28, 1973, Wajda fell from his mount after his right stirrup broke at the start of a race; he was kicked by the horse, and suffered a punctured lung. He died the next day following surgery in Methuen, Massachusetts.

During his career, Wajda won 2224 races, finished second 2131 times, and finished third 1930 times, capturing over $6 million in winnings. At the time of his death, Wajda was a resident of Hollywood, Florida, and Raymond, New Hampshire. He had married Mary Lasofsky in June 1960 in Salisbury, Massachusetts.

A race in his honor, the Henry Wajda Memorial Handicap, was established in 1974 and was held annually at Rockingham Park through at least 1997. In 2011, Wajda was inducted to the New England Racing Hall of Fame. In 2024, a New Hampshire historical marker (no. 290) honoring Wajda was erected near his burial site in his hometown.
