= Forest Glade Cemetery =

Historic cemetery in Strafford County, New Hampshire

- U.S. National Register of Historic Places
- NH State Register of Historic Places
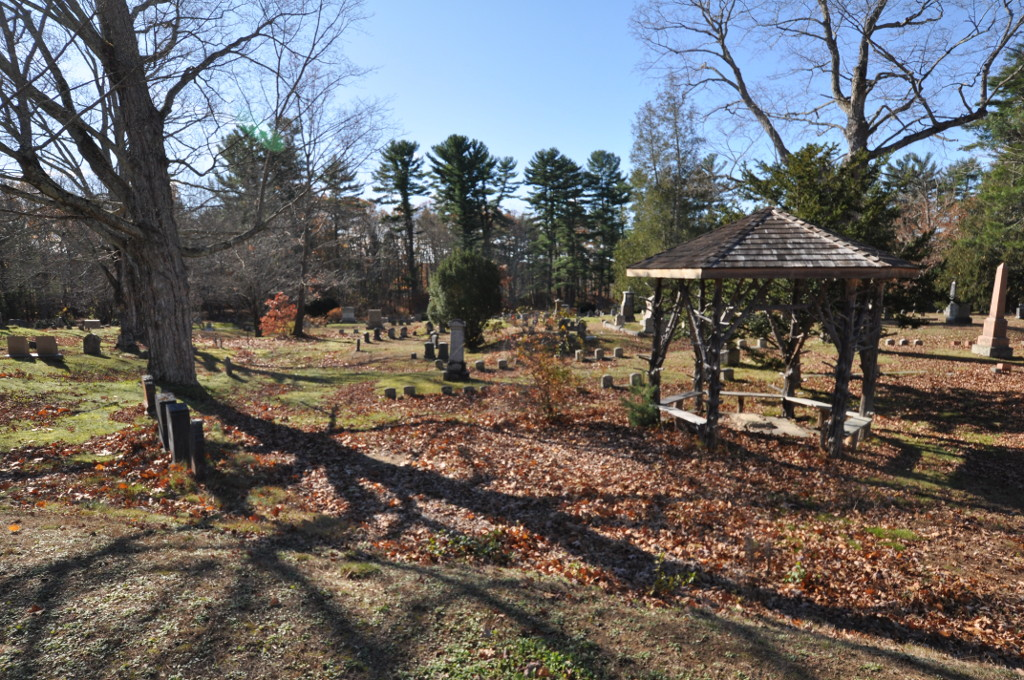

- Location within New Hampshire Location within the United States
- Location: 163 Maple St., Somersworth, New Hampshire
- Coordinates: 43°15′6″N 70°52′54″W
- Area: 22 acres (8.9 ha)
- Built: 1851
- Architectural style: Rural Cemetery
- NRHP reference No.: 100000476

Significant dates
- Added to NRHP: January 17, 2017
- Designated NHSRHP: October 25, 2021

Forest Glade Cemetery is the oldest cemetery in Somersworth, New Hampshire. Set on 22 acres (8.9 ha) on Maple Street, it is a good example of the popular mid-19th century rural cemetery movement. It was listed on the National Register of Historic Places in 2017, and the New Hampshire State Register of Historic Places in 2021.

== Description and history ==
Forest Glade Cemetery is located southwest of downtown Somersworth, on the west side of Maple Street between Tates Brook Road and Bartlett Avenue. While the road frontage of the property is roughly straight, the rear line of the developed portion of the cemetery follows a broad curve. The rolling landscape has circulation roads laid out harmoniously with the terrain, which is dotted with mature plantings. The cemetery's prominent architectural features are the Furber Chapel, a stone English country chapel designed by Henry Vaughan and built in 1898, and the entrance gate, a stone arch bearing the inscription "Until the day dawns and the shadows flee away." (Note: Song of Solomon 2:17)

The cemetery was established in 1851, not long after Somersworth separated from Rollinsford, and was its first municipal cemetery. It has more than 7,000 burials, the oldest dating to 1852. In addition to more than 800 family plots, the cemetery has a dedicated section for members of the American Legion and the Grand Army of the Republic, as well as sections specifically consecrated for Jewish burials, and an area for the burial of the indigent.

== See also ==
- National Register of Historic Places listings in Strafford County, New Hampshire
- New Hampshire Historical Marker No. 287: Forest Glade Cemetery
