= Old Somersworth High School =

- Somersworth High School
- U.S. National Register of Historic Places
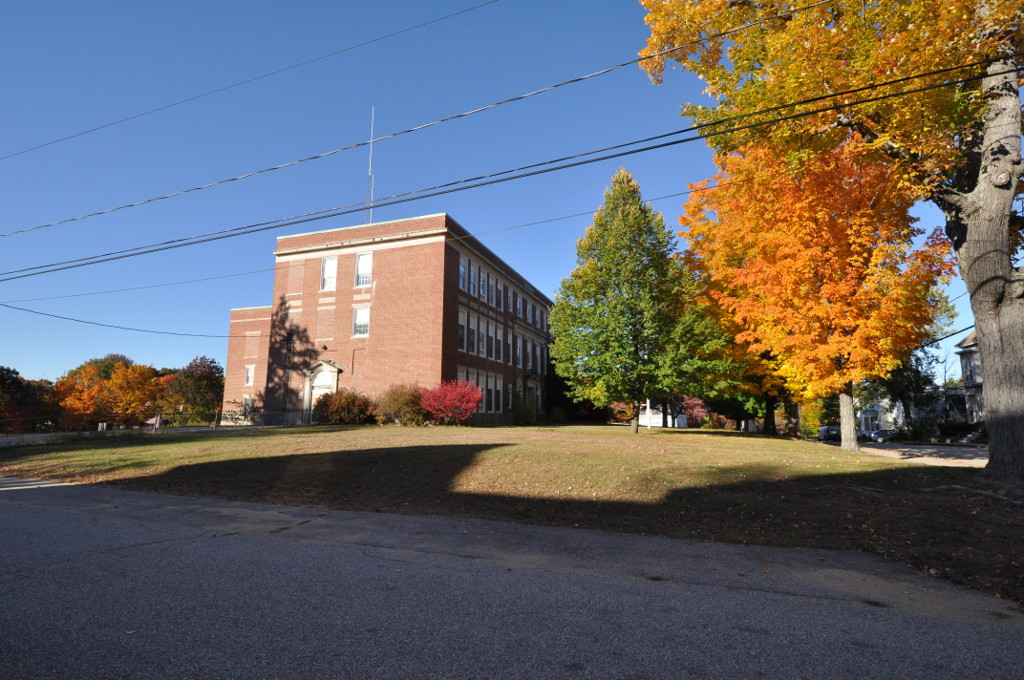

- Location within New Hampshire Location within the United States
- Location: 17 Grand St., Somersworth, New Hampshire
- Coordinates: 43°15′44″N 70°52′5″W
- Built: 1927
- Architectural style: Georgian Revival
- NRHP reference No.: 15000671
- Added to NRHP: September 29, 2015

The Old Somersworth High School, also formerly the Hilltop Elementary School, is a historic school building at 17 Grand Street in Somersworth, New Hampshire. It is a three-story brick Georgian Revival building, constructed in 1927 on the site of New Hampshire's oldest high school. It was designed by Charles Greely Loring, and served as a high school until 1956 and an elementary school until 2007. The building was listed on the National Register of Historic Places in 2015.

== Description and history ==
The former Somersworth High School building stands in a generally residential area on a ridge overlooking downtown Somersworth, on an irregularly shaped lot bounded by Grove, Grand, Highland, and Prospect Streets. It is a three-story masonry structure, built out of brick with stone trim, and faces southeast toward Grand Street. It is roughly H-shaped, with front and rear wings joined by a wide central connector. Windows are generally set in rectangular openings with stone sills and lintels, and a stone cornice is topped by a low brick parapet, obscuring the flat roof. The front facade is fifteen bays wide, with the main entrance at its center, recessed in a square stone-faced opening.

Somersworth built New Hampshire's first municipal high school on this site in 1849. That aging structure was replaced by the present Georgian Revival structure in 1927, and was considered a state-of-the-art high school at the time. It was enlarged in 1939, adding space for vocational training and a biology laboratory. It was used as a high school until 1956, when the city built a new high school. It was then adapted for use as an elementary school, a role it served until closing in 2007.

=== Redevelopment ===
From September 2016 through August 2019, the building underwent an EPA Brownfields assessment and subsequent redevelopment, resulting in it now housing six commercial spaces and 22 residential apartments, all of which were occupied as of July 2021.

== See also ==
- National Register of Historic Places listings in Strafford County, New Hampshire
- New Hampshire Historical Marker No. 280: The Hilltop School “Dedicated to Citizenship”
