= Society to Encourage Studies at Home =

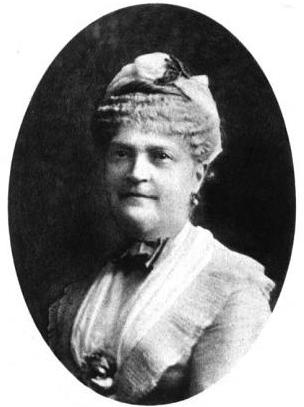
Anna Eliot Ticknor, founder of the Society to Encourage Studies at Home

The Society to Encourage Studies at Home (1873 – ca. 1897) (often abbreviated as SH) was the first correspondence school in the United States. It was founded in Boston, Massachusetts, by Anna Eliot Ticknor.

== History ==
The Society to Encourage Studies at Home was founded in 1873 by Anna Eliot Ticknor (1823–1896), daughter of George Ticknor, historian and Harvard professor. Its purpose was "to induce among ladies the habit of devoting some part of every day to study of a systematic and thorough kind.". It was loosely based upon the English Society for the Encouragement of Home Study though it differed from that institution in a number of respects. The English society extended its benefits only to upper class women of leisure whereas the American society served women of all classes and specifically sought to serve women who were already busy with chores of the home, showing how they might profitably use their time for study and enlightenment. Further, the English society provided only a standard curriculum and students were expected to complete the course work on their own. The American society provided individually planned courses and constant interactive communications between instructors and students. Finally, the English society required its students to travel to London to take a final competitive examination. The American society with its individualized teaching plans dispensed with this formality judging it impractical due to the geographic distances between instructors and students and recognizing the limited financial means of many of its students.

The courses were open only to women and over the 24 years of its existence it served 7,086 students and had over 200 correspondent teachers. The society was voluntarily dissolved in 1897 after the death of Anna Ticknor. Among those involved as teachers were: Ellen Swallow Richards (science), Vida Dutton Scudder (English), Lucretia Crocker (science), Katherine Peabody Loring (history), Alice James (history), Lucy Elliot Keeler (history), Florence Trail (ancient history) and Elizabeth Thorndike Thornton (history).

Among the students of the society were: Mary Parker Follett and Charlotte Perkins Gilman. The Society maintained several thousand volumes in a lending library which was paid for by the small fees charged to students. Instructors offered their time and services free.
