= Jane Grey (disambiguation) =

Lady Jane Grey was a noblewoman and queen of England for nine days.

Jane Grey may also refer to:

- Jane Grey (actress) (1883–1944), American stage and screen actress
- Jane Grey (schooner), a shipwreck in March 1918
- Jane Grey, owner of Violet Bank Museum in Colonial Heights, Virginia
- Jane Grey, kickboxer in W.A.K.O. European Championships 1986
- Jane Grey, a film character in The Working Man (1933)
- Lady Jane Grey (play), a 1715 tragedy by Nicholas Rowe

== See also ==
- Jane Gray (disambiguation)
- Jean Grey, a fictional superhero by Marvel Comics
