= List of New Hampshire historical markers (276–300) =

- «251–275

This page is one of a series of pages that list New Hampshire historical markers. The text of each installed marker is provided within its entry. Although there are fewer than 300 markers, the name of this page allows for future expansion.

Contents
No.	Title	Location	Coordinates
276	The Grave by the Lake	Tuftonboro	43.68888°N 71.30526°W
277	Cold War-era Bomber Crash	Fremont	42.97124°N 71.109309°W
278	Elizabeth Gurley Flynn "The Rebel Girl"	Concord	43.20984°N 71.53951°W
279	The Balch Household Graves	Barrington	43.214517°N 71.003597°W
280	The Hilltop School “Dedicated to Citizenship”	Somersworth	43.26181°N 70.86779°W
281	The Broken 1713 Treaty of Portsmouth	Portsmouth	43.33937°N 70.451363°W
282	Native Retribution Against Maj. Waldron	Dover	43.19593°N 70.87491°W (approx.)
283	The 'Worsted' Church	Canterbury	43.3902243°N 71.4962803°W
284	Betty Brook	Milan	44.544722°N 71.275833°W
285	Abenaki Tower	Tuftonboro	43.670478°N 71.292319°W
286	The Atlantic Heights Neighborhood	Portsmouth	43.0897067°N 70.7722631°W
287	Forest Glade Cemetery	Somersworth	43.25434°N 70.88281°W
288	The Alton Bay Water Bandstand	Alton	43.47316°N 71.2374°W
289	Creation of the Teenage Mutant Ninja Turtles	Dover	43.18903°N 70.87412°W
290	Henry "Hammerin' Hank" Wajda 1934–1973	Newmarket	43.05384°N 70.93714°W
291	Strafford Union Academy 1833–1903 / Austin-Cate Academy 1904–1981	Strafford	43.27174°N 71.12775°W
Notes • References • External links

== Markers 276 to 300 ==
=== 276. The Grave by the Lake ===
Town of Tuftonboro

Location: Melvin Village Community Church

“The nearby granite marker is the first known monument in New Hampshire marking the reparation and reburial of an Indigenous individual. In 1809, the remains of a reportedly 7-foot-tall (Note: 2.13 meters) Abenaki man were found along the banks of the Melvin River; more than a decade later, those remains were reinterred near the original burial location. This site and events inspired the 1865 poem 'The Grave by the Lake' by John Greenleaf Whittier. (Note: The poem can be read online at poetry.com (link).) On Aug. 25, 1955, the marker was installed, an effort between townspeople, archaeologists, and the Native American community.”

=== 277. Cold War-era Bomber Crash ===
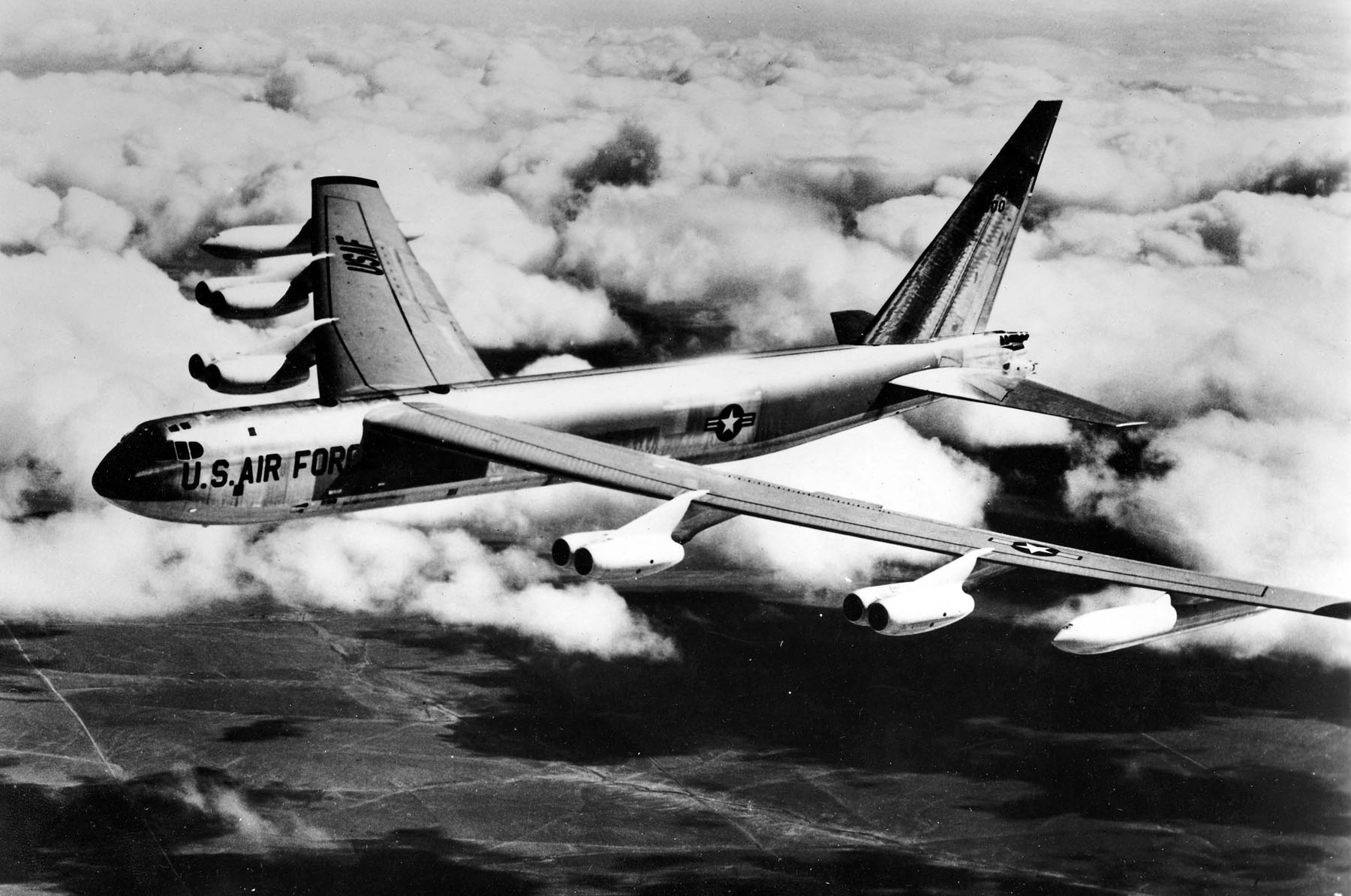
A B-52 similar to the one that crashed in Fremont

Town of Fremont

Location: NH 107 south of Copp Drive

“On the morning of Aug. 10, 1959, during routine training exercises, a B-52 Stratofortress military plane (Note: Serial number 54-2682) crashed into nearby Spruce Swamp. During the flight, the plane’s mechanicals failed, and the pilot ordered all seven crewmembers on board to parachute to safety over Candia. The pilot ejected over Fremont 20 seconds before the plane exploded in mid-air and crashed, burning several acres on impact: later, the U.S. Air Force closed off and cleaned up the site. It was the first time in U.S. history that a B-52 crashed without fatalities.”

=== 278. Elizabeth Gurley Flynn "The Rebel Girl" ===
City of Concord

Location: Corner of Court Street and Montgomery Street

"Born in Concord in 1890, Elizabeth Gurley Flynn was a nationally known labor leader, civil libertarian and feminist organizer. She joined the Industrial Workers of the World at age 17 where her fiery speeches earned her the nickname 'The Rebel Girl.' As a founder of the American Civil Liberties Union, Flynn advocated for women's rights, including supporting their right to vote and access to birth control. She joined the Communist Party in 1936 and was sent to prison in 1951 under the notorious Smith Act."

Note: On May 5, 2023, four days after the marker was unveiled, The Boston Globe reported the marker was "facing backlash from high-ranking Republicans in New Hampshire" due to Flynn's role in the Communist Party. Additionally, New Hampshire Public Radio reported that the commissioner of the New Hampshire Department of Natural and Cultural Resources, which oversees the state's marker program, (Note: The state agency directly responsible for the marker program is the New Hampshire Division of Historical Resources, which is one of several divisions within the Department of Natural and Cultural Resources.) sent a letter to officials in the city of Concord, where the marker was unveiled, offering to have the sign removed if requested by the city. By May 15, the marker had been removed, and its status was updated to "retired" in the state's list of markers. On August 7, two New Hampshire residents who had proposed the marker filed a lawsuit against the state, asserting that it had been removed in violation of the state's Administrative Procedures Act. The Attorney General of New Hampshire, John Formella, requested the lawsuit be dismissed, asserting that the plaintiffs suffered no harm and therefore lacked legal standing. Court hearings on the matter began in January 2024 in Merrimack County Superior Court. In March, the judge dismissed the lawsuit, agreeing that the plaintiffs lacked legal standing.

=== 279. The Balch Household Graves ===
Town of Barrington

Location: NH 9 next to Pine Grove Cemetery

“The reinterred graves of two members of the Balch Household are in Pine Grove Cemetery. Rev. Benjamin Balch (1743-1815) was the first chaplain of the Continental Navy and earned the title of ‘Fighting Parson,’ then served as the pastor of the local Congregational Church. Buried next to him is Aggie (ca. 1740-ca. 1840), an African American woman who was enslaved as a child and who lived out her life in Barrington after her emancipation. Known for nursing the town's sick during a severe epidemic, she also worked as domestic help in the Balch household, most likely between 1784-1815.”

=== 280. The Hilltop School “Dedicated to Citizenship” ===
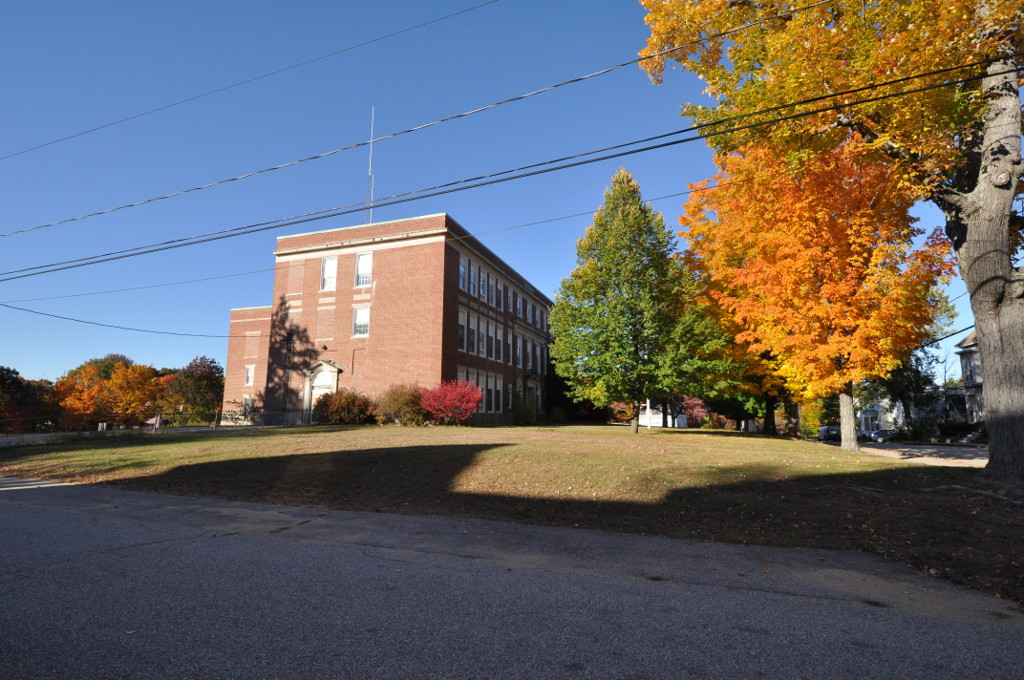
Hilltop School, also known as Old Somersworth High School, in 2015

City of Somersworth

Location: Grand Street

“Great Falls High School, N.H.’s first public high school, was built on this site in 1849. Passage of ‘Somersworth Act’ in 1848 authorized such schools, which supplanted the private academies that had provided secondary education. The 1849 building was replaced in 1927 by this Georgian Revival structure, designed by architect Charles Greely Loring. Enlarged in 1939, it served as Somersowrth High School until 1956, when the building was remodeled as an elementary school and renamed Hilltop School; (Note: The sports teams of Somersworth High School continue to be known as the Hilltoppers.) it closed in 2007.“

=== 281. The Broken 1713 Treaty of Portsmouth ===
City of Portsmouth

Location: South Cemetery (corner of Route 1A and Little Harbor Road)

“During Queen Anne’s War (1702-1713), the Wabanaki Confederacy of native peoples were allied with the French. After the French and English ended the war without consulting France’s native allies, the Wabanaki agreed in 1713 to ratify the Treaty of Portsmouth, by which the English pledged to restrict colonial settlement, respect tribal sovereignty, and expand trade. These promises were not honored or enforced; instead, the treaty opened large areas to new colonial settlement, strengthening Portsmouth as the principal seaport of northern New England.”

=== 282. Native Retribution Against Maj. Waldron ===
City of Dover

Location: Waldron Court (Note: This marker was originally located at 455 Central Avenue.)

"In June 1689, 100 Pennacook attacked Cocheco, (Note: Cocheco, also spelled as Cochecho, was an early name for what is now the City of Dover.) killing Maj. Richard Waldron in revenge for his treachery thirteen years earlier. In 1676, Waldron had invited 400 local native refugees who had recently fought the English in King Phillip’s War to a feast. Following orders from the Mass. General Court, Waldron and three other militia surrounded and attacked his guests. Three hundred and fifty Pennacook and their allies, including 250 women and children, were captured and taken to Boston, where eight were killed and the rest enslaved. Waldron's deceit turned the once peaceful Pennacook into enemies of the English."

Note: In 2025, the text of this marker was revised to correct errors; the revised text is listed above. (Note: The original marker, which stood from 2023 to 2025, read as follows: “In Sept. 1689, 100 Pennacook attacked Cocheco, killing Maj. Richard Waldron in revenge for his treachery thirteen years earlier. In 1676, Waldron had invited 400 Native refugees who had recently fought the English in King Phillip’s War to a feast. Waldron and three other militia surrounded and attacked his guests. Three hundred and fifty Pennacook and their allies, including 250 women and children, were captured and taken to Boston, where eight were killed and the rest enslaved. Waldon's [sic] deceit turned the once peaceful Pennacook into enemies of the English.")

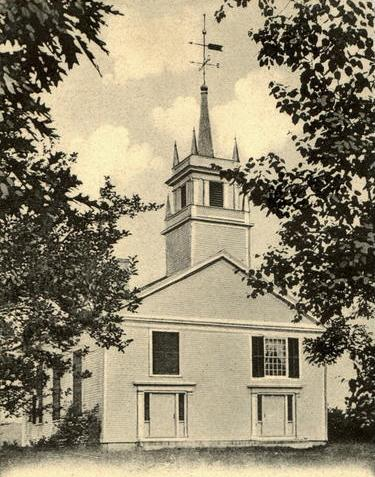
The Worsted Church, c. 1906

=== 283. The 'Worsted' Church ===
Town of Canterbury

Location: West side of Shaker Road, south of Baptist Hill Road

"The unusual name of the former Union church that stood nearby from 1839-1958 (Note: The church was destroyed by a fire ignited by lightning in July 1958.) came from its elaborate interior that was embellished with scripture, homilies, and other decorations made from other materials like cotton gauze, paper and worsted wool. The handiwork of local author, poet and lecturer Sarah Elizabeth Harper Monmouth drew visitors to the church to see the 'curious paper work' on display inside. Monmouth's personal story of frugality after being swindled out of an inheritance captivated people as much as her decorations did." (Note: Monmouth, the daughter of Joseph M. Harper, wrote a memoir entitled Living on Half a Dime a Day.)

=== 284. Betty Brook ===
Town of Milan

Location: NH 110 and York Pond Rd.

"When Beth 'Betty' Richardson (1927 - 2018) was born at the remote Wild River Campground Guard Station in Bean's Purchase, N.H., on June 20, 1927, she was proclaimed the "White Mountain National Forest Baby". Her parents, Alva and Mildred, (Note: A photo of the Richardsons can be seen here.) moved to the area from Maine; her father worked as a U.S. Forest Guard from 1926 to 1937 and her mother wrote a memoir about their experiences. (Note: Mildred Richardson's memoir is Where the Wild River Flows (ISBN 978-1794715622), published in 2019.) In 1928, Alva's colleagues named a brook on York Pond Road after Betty. 'A small brook,' they said, 'for a small girl.'"

=== 285. Abenaki Tower ===
Town of Tuftonboro

Location: NH 109 across from Wawbeek Road

"Abenaki Tower, dedicated in 1924, (Note: The original tower was replaced in 1977–78.) is located on N'dakinna, the traditional lands of the Abenaki Peoples past and present. The lookout is located near the junction of two trails: the Sobagw (Ocean) Trail and the Awasebi (Beyond the Water) Trail. Built by residents of Melvin Village, the tower offers the public free access to enjoy the expansive and beautiful view of the lake and mountains. Its name is meant to recognize the importance of these trails as well as the historical and continuing contributions of the Indigenous Peoples to the area."

=== 286. The Atlantic Heights Neighborhood ===
City of Portsmouth

Location: Hanscom Park

"Since the first shipbuilders and their families moved into the homes built here between 1918-1920, Atlantic Heights has maintained a strong neighborhood identity. Designed by the noted Boston architectural firm of Kilham and Hopkins, the subdivision borrowed design elements from the historical houses of downtown Portsmouth. While some of the community assets such as the school and corner stores have closed, public spaces like parks, walking trails, and organized events for residents provide the characteristic neighborliness that the architects had envisioned with their progressive design."

=== 287. Forest Glade Cemetery ===
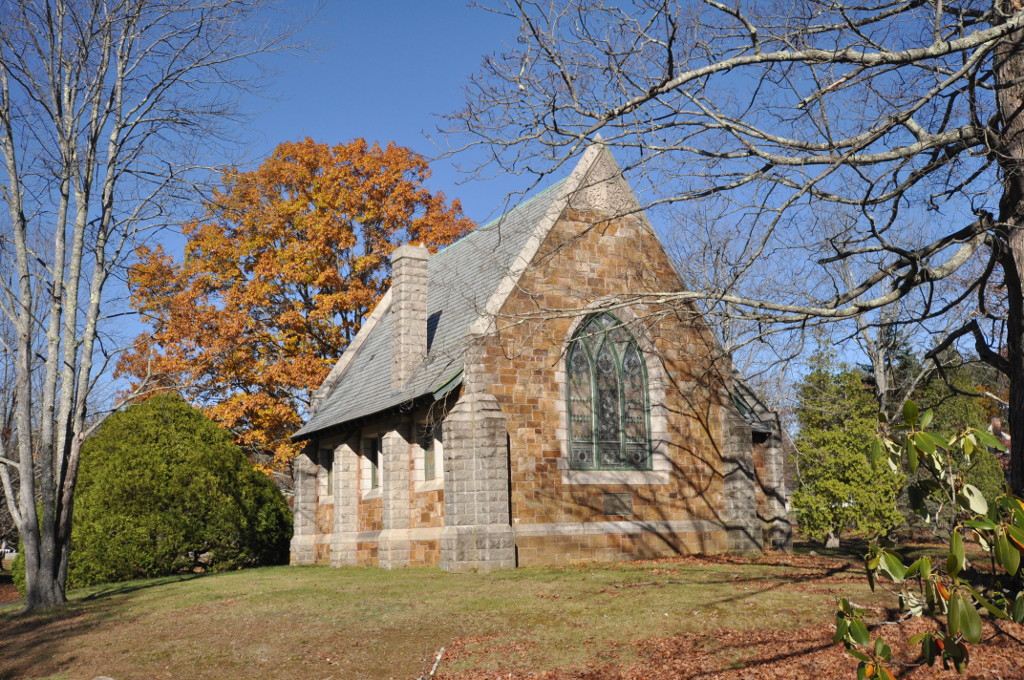
Chapel in Forest Glade Cemetery

City of Somersworth

Location: Forest Glade Cemetery

"When Rollinsford split from Somersworth in 1849, Somersworth had to establish a new public, nonsectarian burial ground. A site near the geographic center of the city was purchased in 1851. The picturesque setting, Gothic chapel, winding pathways, mature trees, and ornate gravestones and monuments make it a notable example of the rural cemetery movement popularized in the 19th century. As an active cemetery, it contains the graves of residents of all walks of life, ranging from ordinary citizens to prominent industrialists and civic leaders."

=== 288. The Alton Bay Water Bandstand ===
Town of Alton

Location: Near 58 Mt. Major Highway (NH 11)

"The only known aquatic bandstand in N.H., the Alton Bay Water Bandstand was designed and built by members of the Alton Bay Racing Association in 1928 as a judging stand for speedboat races and a spot for concerts. Taking advantage of New Hampshire’s seasons, volunteers placed a crib of logs and rocks on the ice in the winter, that structure sank to a shallow ledge in the bay after ‘ice out’ that spring, then the platform and bandstand were built on the base. In a true community effort, the cost of construction was paid for through donations, whist card parties and an appropriation from the town."

=== 289. Creation of the Teenage Mutant Ninja Turtles ===
City of Dover

Location: NH 108 near Union Street

"In November 1983, while living in Dover, Kevin Eastman and Peter Laird created a cast of Ninja weapon-wielding turtles during a late-night drawing session. Amused by the absurdity of the idea, the duo developed the story of four teenage turtle brothers: Leonardo, Raphael, Donatello and Michelangelo. The one-shot comic, published independently by Mirage Studios on Union Street, debuted in 1984. Teenage Mutant Ninja Turtles soon became a full comic series and ultimately an international multimedia franchise."

=== 290. Henry "Hammerin' Hank" Wajda 1934–1973 ===
Town of Newmarket

Location: NH 108 outside Calvary Cemetery

"N.H.'s most successful jockey of the 20th century, Wajda, (Note: Polish: [ˈvajda], pronounced as "Vaida".) a Newmarket native, won over 2,200 races and achieved leading jockey honors at all major New England tracks. In 1958, he set a world record at Rockingham Park riding Mark Antony. (Note: Wajda, riding Mark Antony on September 6, 1958, covered 1 mile and 70 yards (1.04 mi; 1.67 km) in 1:39 1/5.) He ranked 5th in the nation and was one of the region's highest paid professional athletes in 1963. During his career he was recognized for saving a rival jockey from a fatal fall at Suffolk Downs. (Note: Wajda, riding Lusty Andy on June 30, 1960, pulled fellow jockey Anthony DeSpirito back onto Color Bearer after DeSpirito had been knocked off his saddle in the first turn and was clinging to his mount by one hand and had a foot caught in a stirrup.) Wajda lost his own life in 1973, (Note: Wajda, riding Zabush on July 28, 1973, fell from his mount after his right stirrup broke—he died the next day following surgery in Methuen, Massachusetts.) following an accident at Rockingham Park."

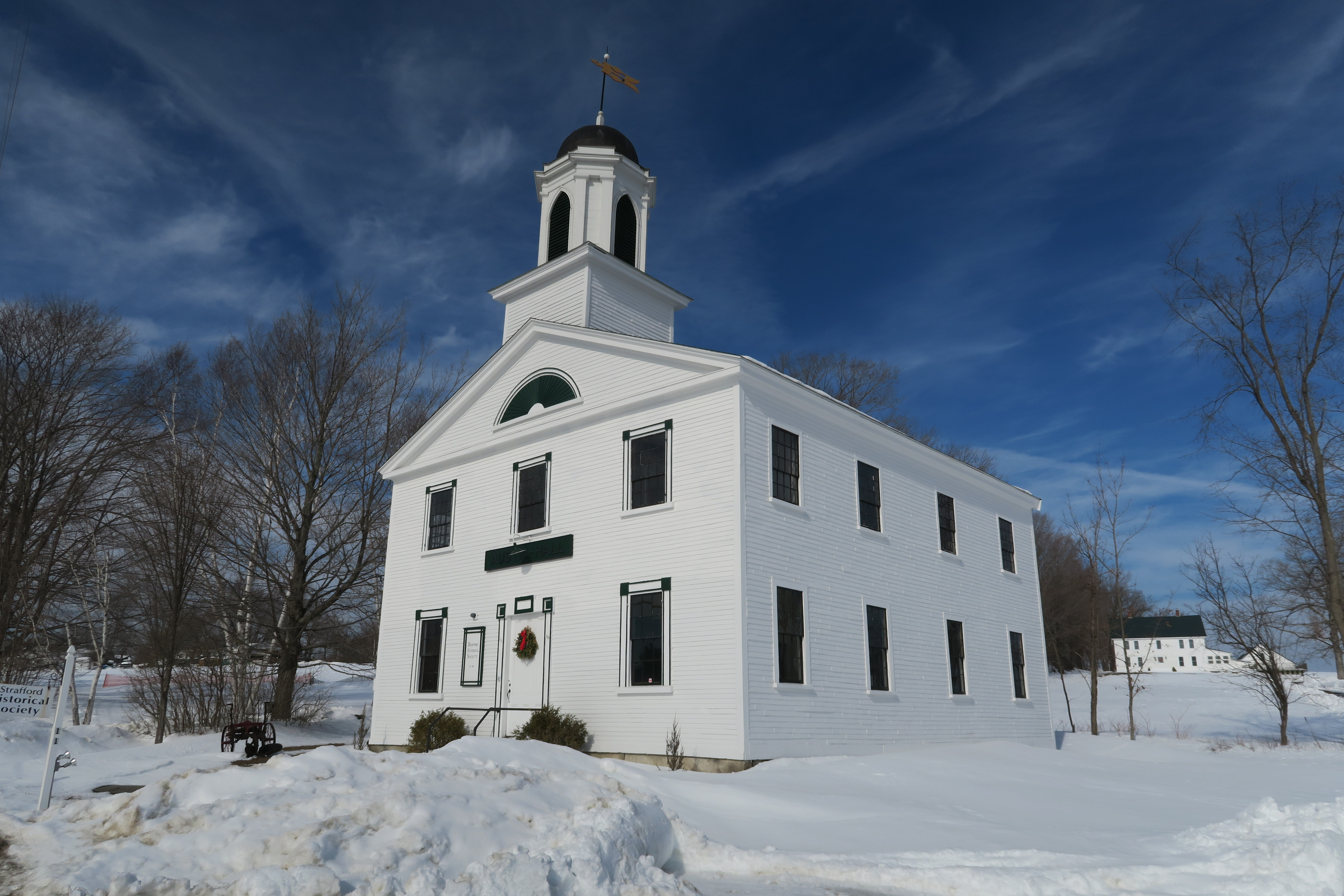
Strafford Union Academy building, now known as Austin Hall

=== 291. Strafford Union Academy 1833–1903 / Austin-Cate Academy 1904–1981 ===
Town of Strafford

Location: NH 126 outside the New Hampshire National Guard training site

Note: The marker has different text on each side.

"Strafford Union Academy, founded in 1833, served as a private secondary school in a building that is today known as Austin Hall. In 1848, the Academy became Strafford Seminary, which both educated local students and served as a seminary for the Free Will Baptist denomination. The school's name changed again to Austin Academy in 1866 for benefactor the Rev. Daniel Austin of Portsmouth. The Academy's association with the Free Will Baptists ended in 1881. In 1903, the school moved to this hillside campus."

"After visiting the campus of private boarding and day school Austin Academy, successful shoe manufacturer George Cate (Note: George N. Cate was born in Wolfeboro, New Hampshire, and lived for many years in Marlborough, Massachusetts—he was described as a builder, lumber dealer, and former bank trustee at the time of his death in 1901, aged 76.) donated funds to expand its campus. (Note: Shortly after his death, Cate's donation was reported as $20,000 ($774,000 in 2025) with the remainder of his estate to go to the academy after the death of his widow.) Following his death, the school was renamed Austin-Cate Academy. After fires destroyed several structures, architect J. Edward Richardson designed new buildings in brick in the 1930s. Attendance by Strafford students declined steadily in the late 1960s and by the mid-1970s it was a private boarding school with very few day students. The school closed in 1981."
