= New Hampshire historical markers =

US state signage

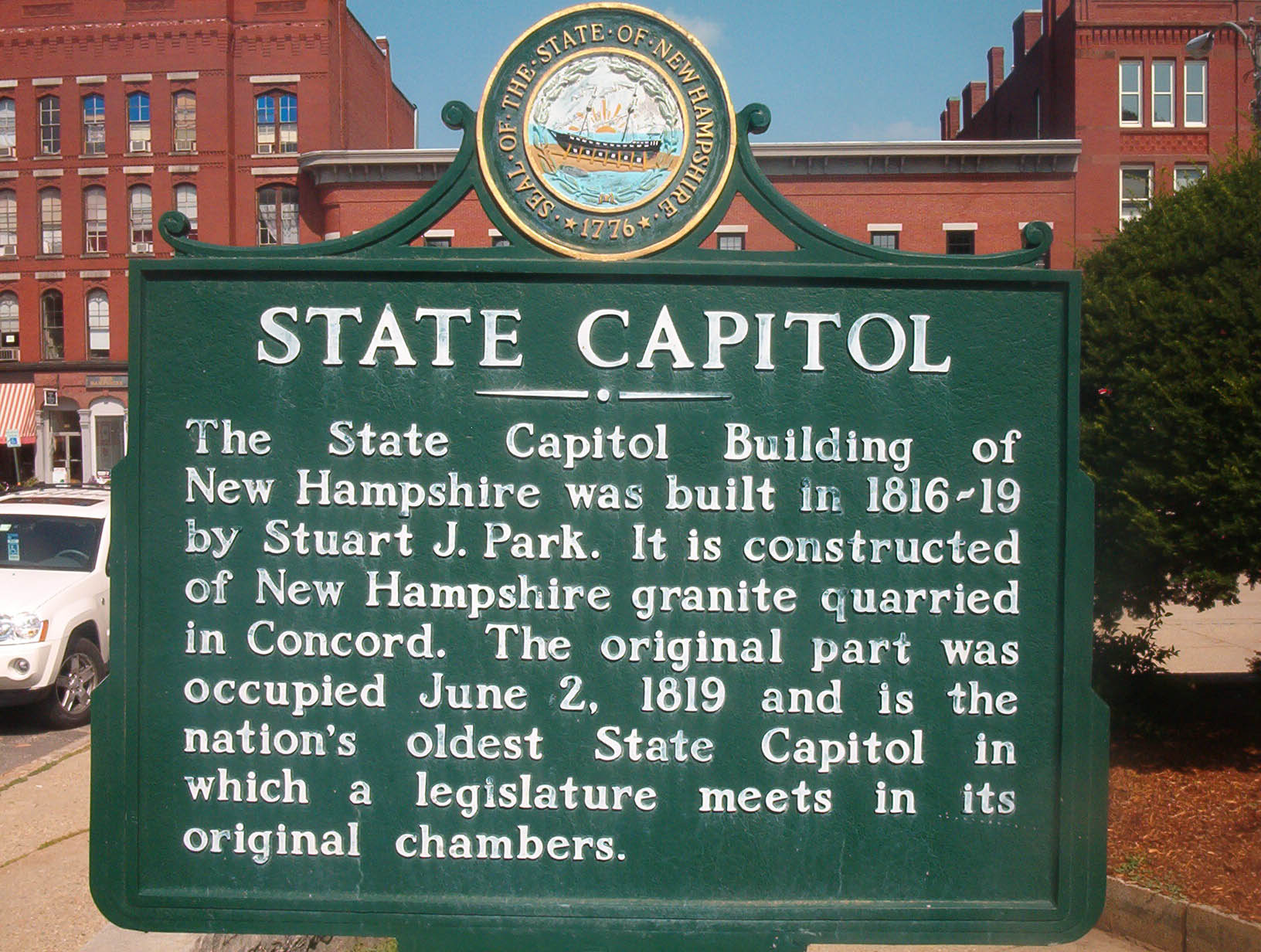
Example of a New Hampshire historical marker

The U.S. state of New Hampshire has placed historical markers since 1958 at locations that are deemed significant to New Hampshire history. The New Hampshire Division of Historical Resources (DHR) and the Department of Transportation (DOT) are jointly responsible for the historical marker program. The program is authorized by RSA 227 C:4, X, and RSA 236:40 to 44. As of February 2025, DHR has installed 291 markers, although several have been retired or refurbished.

== Markers ==
New Hampshire's historical markers are green with white text; the state seal sits atop each one. There is generally a title line and up to 12 lines of text, each of which has no more than 45 characters. Some markers note the year they were installed; it may be centered under the main text (early 2000s to present) or right-justified under the main text (1980s through early 2000s), although there are some visible exceptions. The installation date is not listed on older markers.

Any individual or group may propose a marker to commemorate significant New Hampshire places, persons, or events. Requests must be accompanied by a petition for the marker, signed by at least 20 New Hampshire citizens. The state's Division of Historical Resources has final decision rights for all markers. Markers funded by the state must be located along a state highway. A "co-operative marker" must be funded by whoever proposes it, and it can be located on a locally maintained road or on municipal land. As of October 2021, the state's website listed the cost of a marker at $2,000 to $2,500.

Markers generally have the same text on both sides, with some exceptions. Marker number one in Pittsburg only has text on one side. (Note: Marker number 55 in Rumney, now retired, was also reported as being blank on one side.) Marker number 122 in Carroll features the Mount Washington Hotel on one side and the Bretton Woods Monetary Conference on the other; several other markers also have different topics on each side. A few markers appear to have unique layouts:

- Number 127 in Portsmouth provides a two-part narrative on a single subject, directing the reader to "see other side".
- Number 207 in Madison includes an image of the Gee Bee Model R-1 airplane built by Granville Brothers Aircraft.
- Number 208 in Manchester has text on one side in English, and the same information on the other side in French.
- Number 236 in Concord discusses Civil War mustering on one side and lists specific regiments on the other.

Organizers have advised, via the state's website, "As of January, 2025, the Historical Highway Marker program is currently focused on the rehabilitation and repair of existing markers and is not currently accepting new marker proposals."

=== Marker status ===
The state periodically publishes a roster of markers which lists the status of each one. The vast majority of markers are "Installed", while a few may be "Out for Repair". Several markers have been "Retired", which indicates permanent removal. A New Hampshire Historical Highway Marker Advisory Committee has existed since the summer of 2020, "created and convened to complete a systematic review of existing markers for lack of historical context among other problems."

=== Retired markers ===
In 2023, the state published and revised criteria whereby markers may be retired:

1. The marker contains errors of fact
2. The condition of the marker is such that the cost of repair approaches the cost of a new marker
3. The marker requires refurbishment, but its historical or educational value is "severely limited"

Since March 2022, the following markers have been listed as retired:

- Number 36 in Bow, which discussed an 1833 visit by Andrew Jackson
- Number 55 in Rumney, which discussed the 1712 destruction of "a Pemigewasset Indian village" and resulting "scalp bounty"
- Number 85 in Raymond, which discussed "the 1747 massacre of [three residents] by Indians of the Winnipesaukee Tribe"
- Number 278 in Concord, which discussed Elizabeth Gurley Flynn, a labor leader and feminist who served as chairwoman of the Communist Party USA and was convicted under the Smith Act

=== Marker Quest ===
In May 2022, the Division of Historical Resources announced a Historical Highway Marker Quest program, encouraging people to visit the state's markers, and offering a free sticker to anyone who visits 10 markers and submits a form listing them.

== List of markers ==
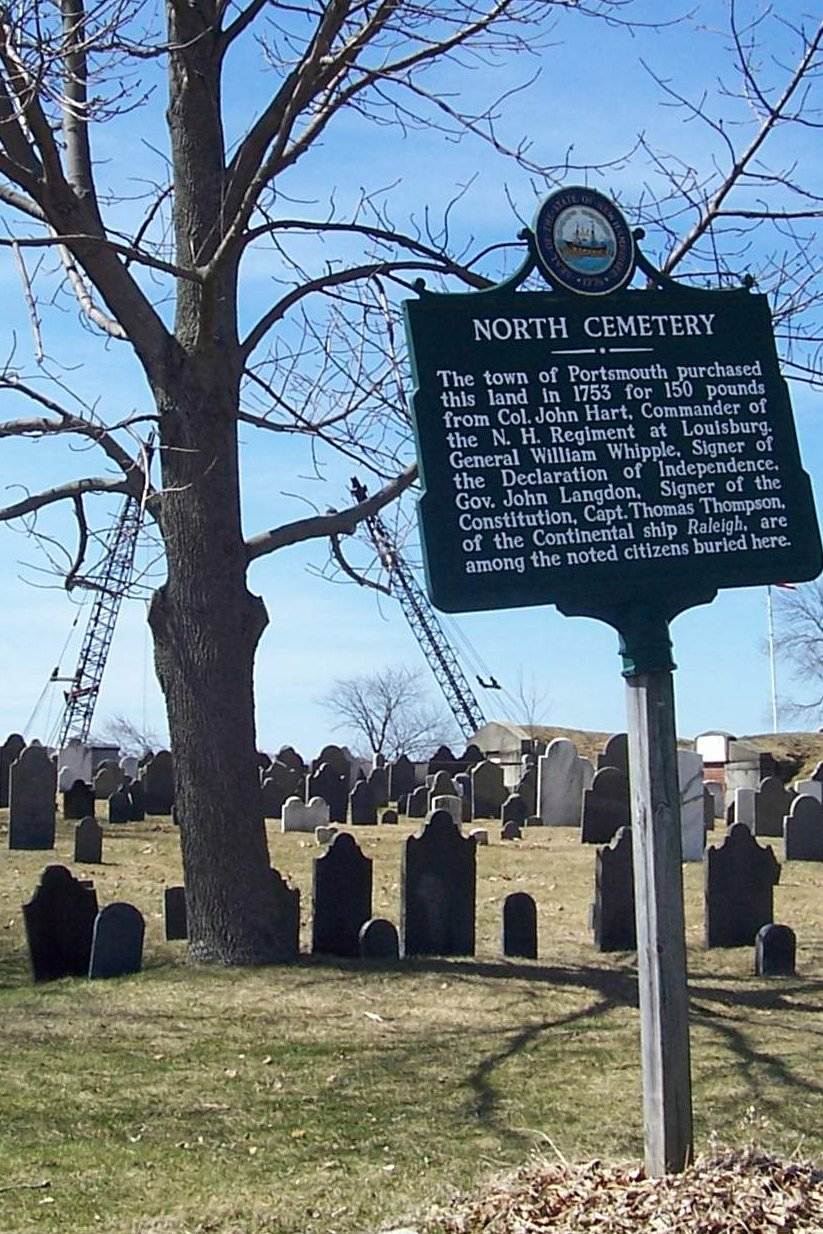
Marker number 114 in Portsmouth

The following pages list each marker, ordered by marker numbers as chronologically assigned by the state. Each page contains 25 entries, noting each marker's city or town, and providing the text on the marker.

- List of New Hampshire historical markers (1–25)
- List of New Hampshire historical markers (26–50)
- List of New Hampshire historical markers (51–75)
- List of New Hampshire historical markers (76–100)
- List of New Hampshire historical markers (101–125)
- List of New Hampshire historical markers (126–150)
- List of New Hampshire historical markers (151–175)
- List of New Hampshire historical markers (176–200)
- List of New Hampshire historical markers (201–225)
- List of New Hampshire historical markers (226–250)
- List of New Hampshire historical markers (251–275)
- List of New Hampshire historical markers (276–300)

== Markers by community ==
The below table alphabetically lists each city or town that has at least one historical marker. Detail of individual markers can be viewed via the above list of markers. The capital city of Concord has the most markers, with 14 (one of which has been retired).

City or town	Marker numbers
Allenstown	193†, 205, 211, 230†
Alton	164, 288
Amherst	3
Andover	54
Antrim	178, 228
Ashland	100, 163
Barnstead	201
Barrington	96, 212, 279
Bartlett	109
Bath	121, 217
Bean's Grant	45
Bedford	102
Belmont	235†
Bennington	153
Benton	245
Berlin	159, 215, 254, 255
Bethlehem	198, 218, 257
Boscawen	49, 256
Bow	36‡
Bradford	108
Brentwood	180, 249
Bristol	269
Brookline	271
Campton	196
Canaan	21, 246
Candia	141, 237†
Canterbury	283
Carroll	30, 87, 122†, 233, 274
Center Harbor	7
Charlestown	2, 117, 177
Chester	14, 139
Chesterfield	60, 95, 216
Claremont	41, 57, 188
Clarksville	115
Concord	66, 67, 80, 105, 110, 125, 128, 147, 148, 175, 184, 236†, 238, 278‡
Conway	38
Cornish	16, 76, 134, 158, 265
Danville	169, 258
Deerfield	25, 145, 183, 214
Derry	48, 58, 126, 266†
Dixville	171
Dover	51, 92, 165, 264, 282, 289
Dunbarton	111
Durham	8, 50†, 89, 154
Easton	200
Effingham	83
Enfield	202, 241
Epsom	199
Exeter	32, 97, 131, 161, 240
Farmington	98
Fitzwilliam	99
Francestown	23, 43
Franconia	9, 263
Franklin	91, 129
Fremont	142, 156, 157, 167, 170, 277
Gilford	118, 239
Gilmanton	17
Gilsum	168
Goshen	140
Grafton	251, 252
Greenfield	130
Greenland	113
Hampstead	247
Hampton	28, 119
Hampton Falls	37
Hanover	261
Hart's Location	186, 213
Haverhill	56, 104, 136, 160, 190
Hebron	223
Hill	162
Hillsborough	65, 107, 203
Hinsdale	112, 204
Holderness	39
Hollis	260
Hooksett	132
Hopkinton	195
Jaffrey	13
Jefferson	19, 152, 229
Keene	69, 86, 226
Kingston	46
Laconia	135, 172
Lancaster	84, 173, 219
Lempster	182
Lincoln	224
Lisbon	70
Littleton	71, 185
Londonderry	166
Loudon	15
Madison	207
Manchester	124, 208†, 225
Mason	35
Merrimack	29, 79
Milan	227, 284
Milford	133, 268
Nashua	267
New Boston	146
New Castle	4
New Durham	222
New Ipswich	10, 101, 137
Newbury	81
Newfields	272
Newington	151
Newmarket	209, 290
Newport	6, 106
North Hampton	62
Northwood	24, 181
Nottingham	259
Orford	33
Ossipee	20
Pelham	176
Pembroke	144, 187, 250†
Peterborough	206, 210, 244, 270
Pinkham's Grant	11
Pittsburg	1
Pittsfield	197
Plainfield	77
Plymouth	179, 189
Portsmouth	75, 114, 127†, 194, 234, 281, 286
Randolph	220
Raymond	85‡, 273
Richmond	59
Rindge	138
Rochester	42, 191
Rollinsford	88
Rumney	55‡, 174
Rye	18, 63, 78
Salem	72, 221, 253
Sandown	26
Sandwich	82, 248
Seabrook	103, 120
Sharon	68
Somersworth	280, 287
Stark	150
Stewartstown	47, 64
Stoddard	27, 52
Strafford	291
Stratford	34
Sugar Hill	73
Surry	93
Sutton	44
Swanzey	22, 232
Tamworth	31, 90, 155
Temple	12
Tilton	149, 262
Tuftonboro	276, 285
Wakefield	5, 123
Walpole	61
Warner	243
Warren	231, 275
Washington	94
Weare	143, 192
Westmoreland	74
Wilmot	40
Wolfeboro	53, 116, 242

† denotes markers with a different inscription on each side
‡ denotes markers listed as "retired"

== See also ==
- Massachusetts historical markers
