= William Loring (judge) =

American judge (1851–1930)

William Caleb Loring
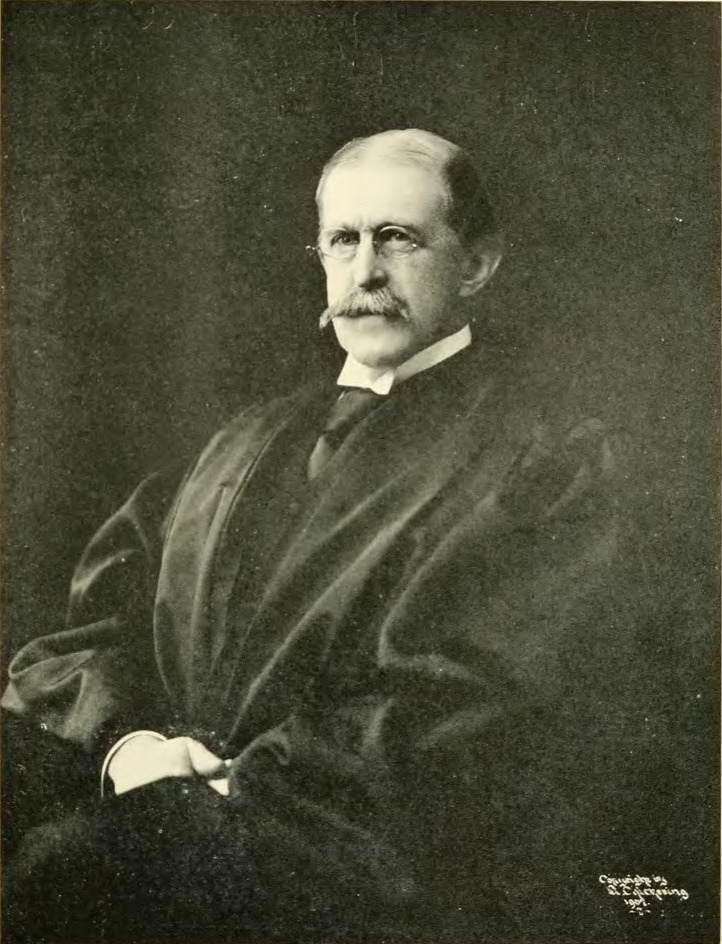
- Born: August 24, 1851; Beverly, Massachusetts, U.S.
- Died: September 8, 1930 (aged 79); Beverly, Massachusetts, U.S.
- Resting place: Mount Auburn Cemetery, Cambridge, Massachusetts
- Education: Harvard University
- Occupation: Lawyer
- Spouse: Susan Mason Lawrence (m. 1883; died 1923)
- Children: None
- Relatives: Katharine Peabody Loring (sister)

William Caleb Loring (August 24, 1851 – September 8, 1930) was an American lawyer who served as a justice of the Massachusetts Supreme Judicial Court from September 7, 1899, to September 16, 1919, appointed by Governor Roger Wolcott.

== Biography ==
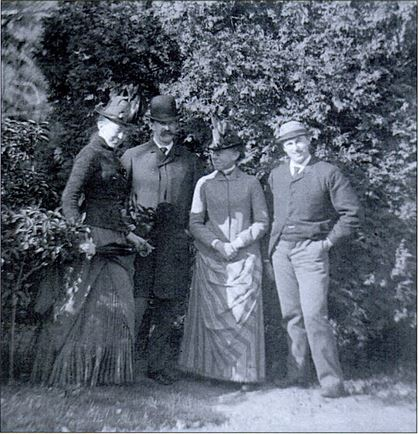
Loring siblings, circa 1870—from left: Katharine Peabody Loring, William Caleb Loring, Louisa Putnam Loring, and Augustus Peabody Loring

Born in Beverly, Massachusetts, to Caleb William and Elizabeth Smith (Peabody) Loring, he attended a private school and graduated from Harvard College in 1872, where he was a rower on the university crew team. Continuing at Harvard, he received an A.M. in 1875.

He became an Assistant Attorney General of Massachusetts on December 1, 1875, serving in that position until July 1878, when he resigned to become a partner in the law firm of Ropes & Gray (thereafter called Ropes, Gray and Loring until his departure). In this capacity, he served as general solicitor and later general counsel of the New York and New England Railroad, from 1882 to 1886. When partner John Codman Ropes died in 1899, Loring was a pallbearer at his funeral.

=== Judicial career ===
On August 30, 1899, Governor Roger Wolcott nominated Loring to a seat on the Massachusetts Supreme Judicial Court vacated by the elevation of Oliver Wendell Holmes Jr. to chief justice. Loring's nomination was confirmed by the Massachusetts Senate on September 11, 1899. He remained on the court until 1919, stepping down from the bench a week after the twentieth anniversary of his assumption of that office.

Loring remained involved with Harvard College during and after his tenure on the court. In 1901, the institution awarded Loring an honorary LL.D., and from 1902 to 1911, he sat on the board of overseers of Harvard College. After leaving the court, he lectured at Harvard Law School on the practice of the law, from 1921 to 1929. In addition, Loring served as the first chair of the Judicial Council of Massachusetts, from 1924 to 1926.

=== Personal life ===
Loring's paternal grandfather was Charles Greely Loring, a Boston-based lawyer. His older sister was Katharine Peabody Loring, a noted educator.

In 1883, Loring married Susan Mason Lawrence, who died in 1923. They had no children.

Political offices
Preceded by Oliver Wendell Holmes Jr.	Justice of the Massachusetts Supreme Judicial Court; 1899–1919	Succeeded by Charles Jenney
