= Charles Greely Loring (lawyer) =

American lawyer (1794–1867)

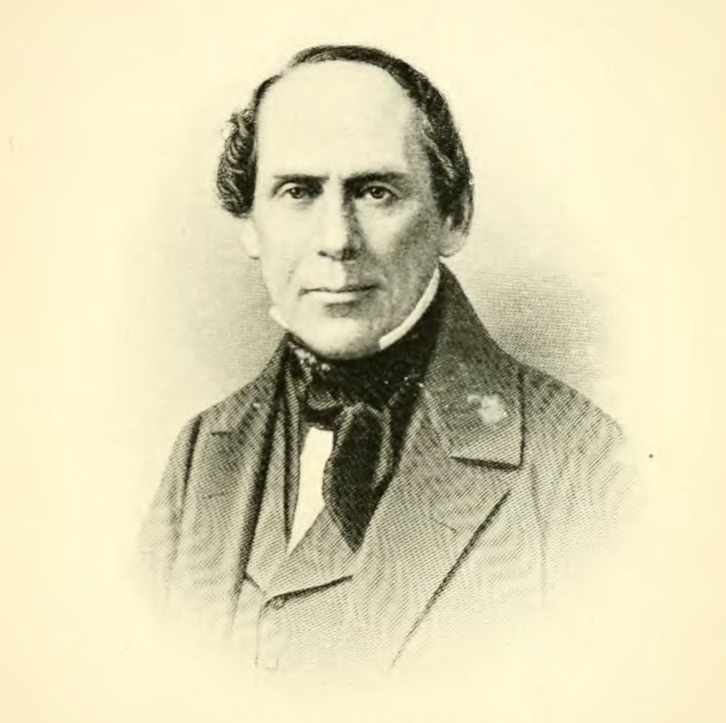

Member of the Massachusetts Senate from the 3rd Suffolk district
- In office 1862

Personal details
- Born: May 2, 1794 Boston, Massachusetts, U.S.
- Died: October 8, 1867 (aged 73) Beverly, Massachusetts, U.S.
- Resting place: Mount Auburn Cemetery, Cambridge, Massachusetts
- Party: Republican
- Spouses: Anna Pierce Brace (m. 1818; died 1836); Mary Ann Putnam (m. 1840; died 1845); Cornelia Goddard (née Amory) (m. 1850)
- Children: 5, incl. Charles Greely Loring Jr.
- Education: Harvard College, Litchfield Law School
- Occupation: Lawyer
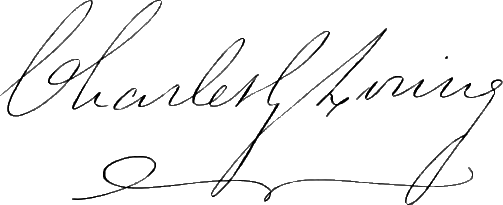
- Signature

Charles Greely Loring Sr. (May 2, 1794 – October 8, 1867) was an American lawyer based in Boston. He also served one term in the Massachusetts Senate.

== Biography ==
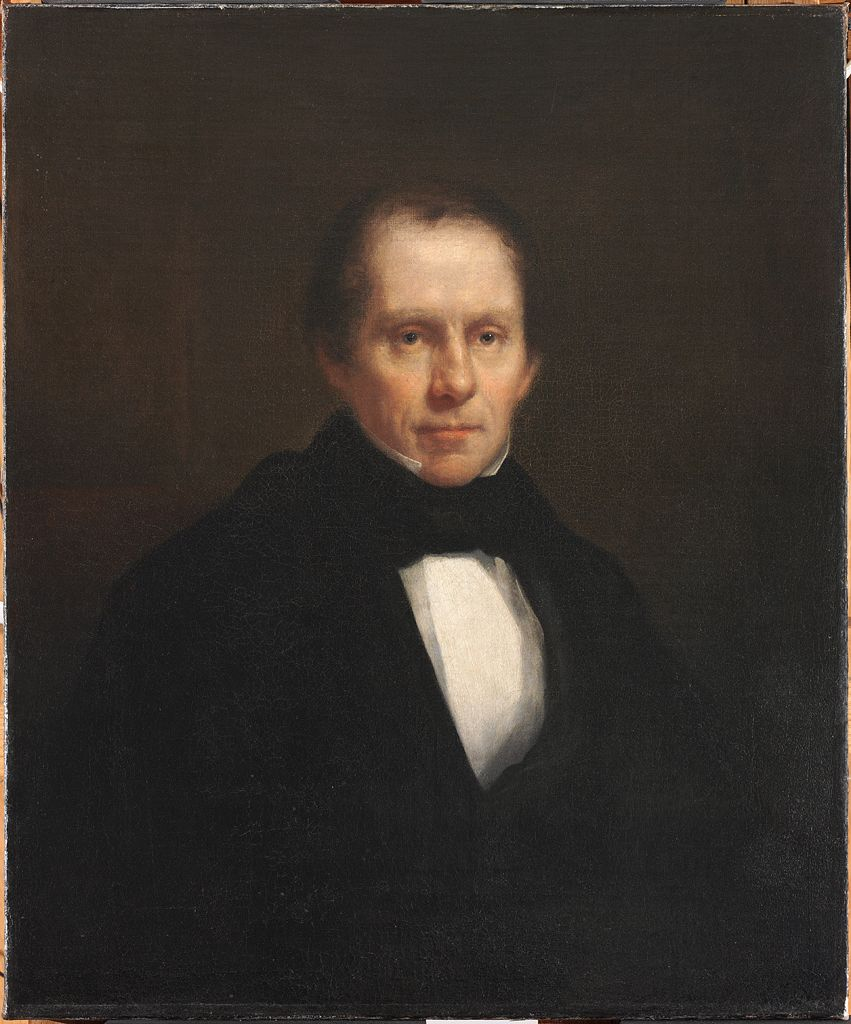
A portrait of Loring by William Page

=== Early life ===
Loring was born in 1794 in Boston, Massachusetts, a descendant of Thomas Loring, an early settler of the area who arrived from England in 1634. He was educated at Boston Latin School, then graduated from Harvard College in 1812, where he was a member of Phi Beta Kappa. He then attended Litchfield Law School in Connecticut and was admitted to the bar of Suffolk County, Massachusetts, in 1815.

=== Professional career ===
After working in the offices of Charles Jackson, Loring established his own law practice. He was practicing in Boston by 1816, first with an unrelated partner until 1819, and later with his brother Francis Caleb Loring and his son Caleb William Loring.

In 1851, Loring served, along with Robert Rantoul Jr. and Samuel Edmund Sewall, as defense counsel for Thomas Sims, an African American from Georgia who had escaped to Boston. Arrested under the Fugitive Slave Act of 1850, Sims was ordered back to enslavement, despite vigorous efforts by his lawyers. In 1854, Loring became an actuary for the Massachusetts Hospital Life Insurance Company, giving up most of his law practice.

In addition to his nearly 40-year law career, Loring was a Harvard Fellow from 1835 to 1857, and was a member of multiple organizations including the American Academy of Arts and Sciences, American Antiquarian Society, and Massachusetts Historical Society. Harvard professor Theophilus Parsons wrote of Loring:

From 1825 to 1855 the published reports show that no other man in Boston had so large a number of cases in court, and of the cases of no other was the proportion of cases so large which by the novelty of the questions they raised ... may be considered as establishing new law or giving more scope to recognized law.

A member of the Republican Party, Loring was elected to the Massachusetts Senate in November 1861, taking his seat as a member of the 1862 Massachusetts legislature. He was chair of the Judiciary Committee and a member of the Committee on Mercantile Affairs. In October 1862, he declined renomination for the Senate, although his supporters attempted to persuade him otherwise.

=== Personal life ===
Loring married three times and was a widower twice. In 1818, he married Anna Pierce Brace of Litchfield, Connecticut; she died in 1836. In 1840, he married Mary Ann Putnam of Salem, Massachusetts; she died in 1845. In 1850, he married Cornelia Goddard (née Amory; she was a founder of the New England Hospital for Women and Children) of Boston; she died after Loring, in 1875.

Loring had four children who survived to adulthood, all with his first wife:

- son Caleb William Loring (1819–1897) was a lawyer and manufacturing executive—his oldest daughter was Katharine Peabody Loring, a notable educator; his oldest son was William Caleb Loring, a notable judge.
- daughter Jane Lathrop Loring (1821–1909) married botanist Asa Gray.
- daughter Susan Mary Loring (1823–1905) married Patrick Tracy Jackson (1818–1891; son of the like-named industrialist Patrick Tracy Jackson)—their second son, Charles Loring Jackson, was a notable organic chemist.
- son Charles Greely Loring Jr. (1828–1902) was a Union Army general during the Civil War, and later was curator and director of Boston's Museum of Fine Arts—his son Charles Greely Loring III was a notable architect.

Loring and his third wife had a child who was born in 1851 and died in 1852.

In 1846, Loring had a summer house built in Beverly, Massachusetts, in the area known as Prides Crossing. He died there in October 1867—in reporting his passing, the Boston Evening Transcript wrote that "he was among [Boston's] most prominent and esteemed citizens during the whole of his mature and faithful life."
