= John Balch House =

Historic house in Massachusetts, United States

Coordinates: 42°33′44″N 70°53′3.8″W

- U.S. National Register of Historic Places
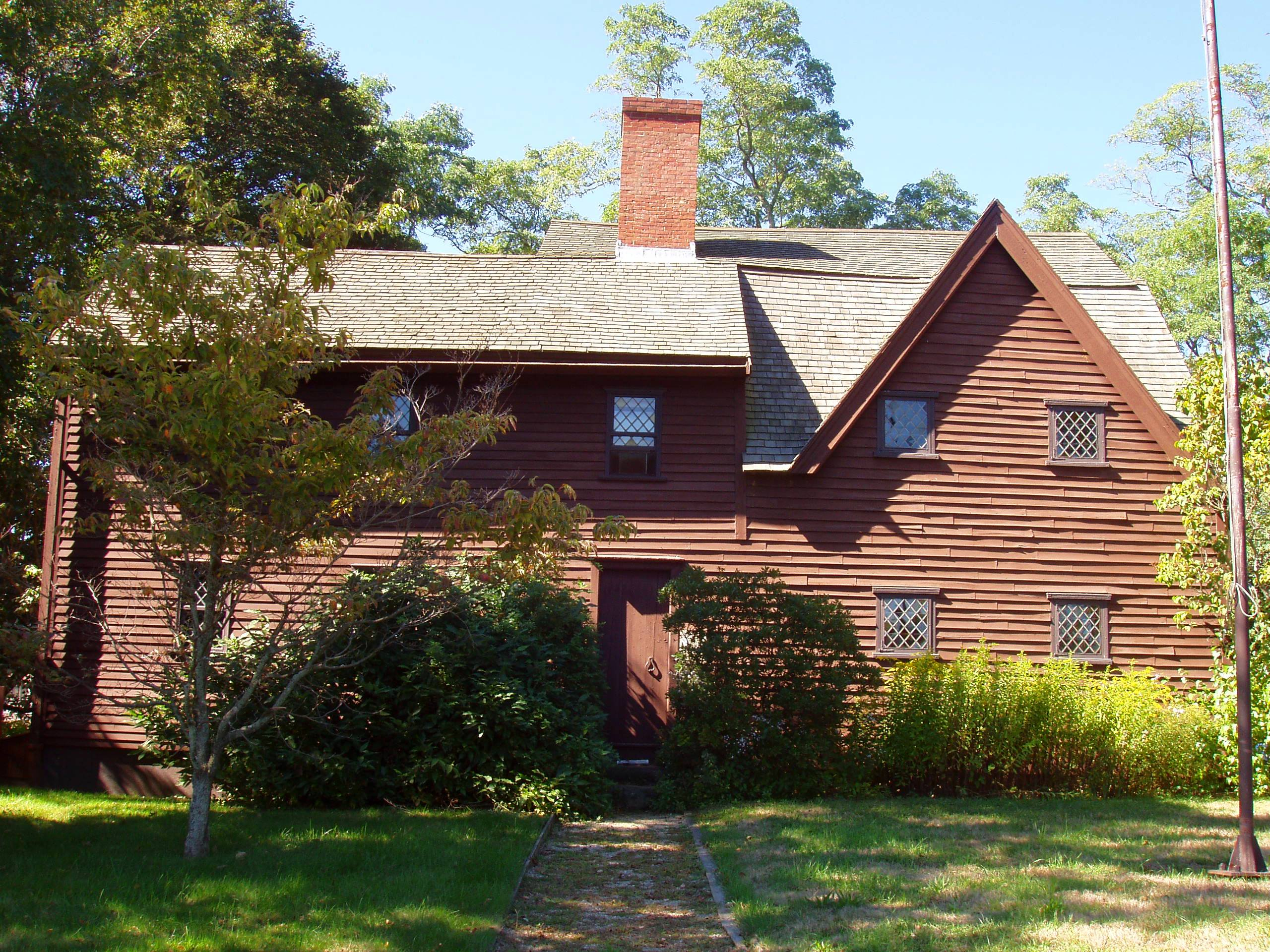
- John Balch House, Beverly, Massachusetts.
- Location: 448 Cabot St. Beverly, Massachusetts
- Built: 1679
- NRHP reference No.: 73000275
- Added to NRHP: February 23, 1973

The John Balch House, located at 448 Cabot Street, Beverly, Massachusetts, is one of the oldest wood-frame houses in the United States. It is now operated as one of the historic house museums of Historic Beverly, and open seasonally.

== History ==
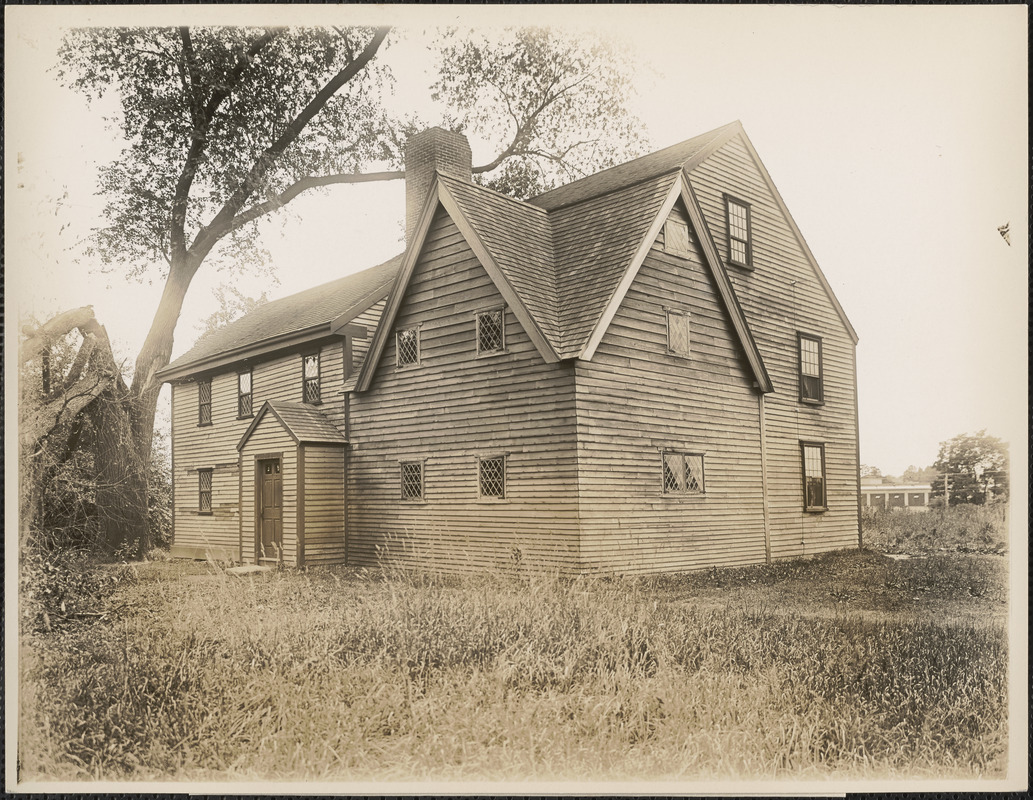
Old Balch House, August 1929

John Balch gained title to the land on November 11, 1635, through the "Thousand Acre Grant" and apparently was living on this property by 1636. This was the date assigned to the house by the Beverly Historic Society. Architectural historians, including Abbott Lowell Cummings, the leading expert on early New England architecture, were only sure that the Balch House was a seventeenth-century house. In 2006, dendrochronological analysis dated the earliest portion (the right-hand side) to 1679. The southern portion of the house was built in 1721.

The house remained within the Balch family until 1916, though with periods of tenant rental. It was then acquired by the Balch Family Association. They hired Norman Isham, a popular preservation architect, to evaluate the house. After finding original rafters in the attic, he recommended that the back lean-to be ripped off and the southern half of the house be dismantled. This plan was eventually modified to expose and recreate the roofline of the original story and a half structure. Thus today's house has been heavily shaped by intentional restoration. In 1932, the home was turned over to the Beverly Historical Society (now Historic Beverly), which maintains and operates it today.

== See also ==
- National Register of Historic Places listings in Essex County, Massachusetts
- List of the oldest buildings in Massachusetts
