= Jane Loring Gray =

American editor (1821–1909)

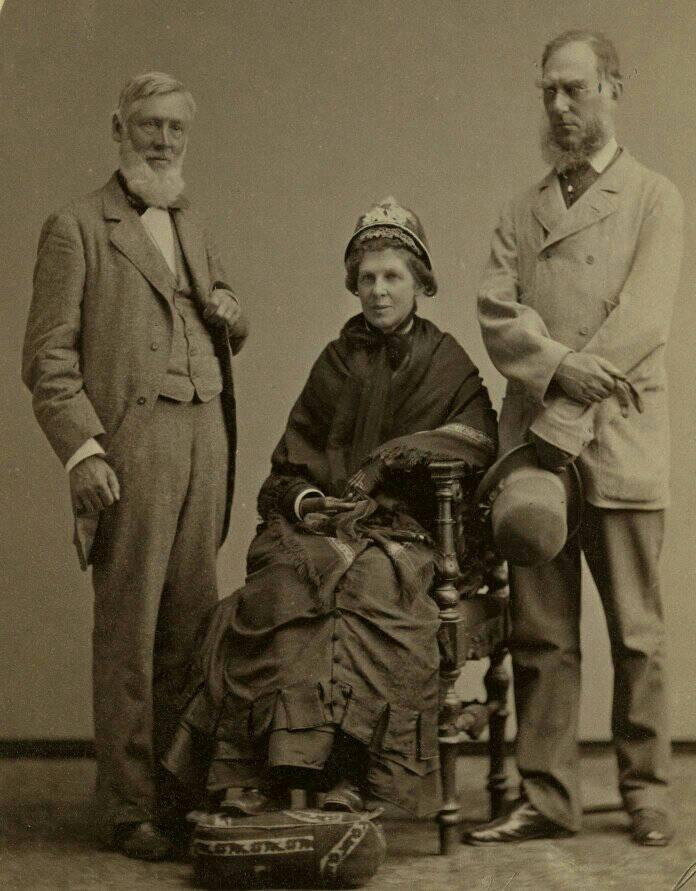
Asa and Jane Gray with Joseph Hooker, 1877

Jane Loring Gray (1821–1909) was an American editor. Although she was not herself a botanist, through her sympathy with her husband, Asa Gray, in his scientific work, she became acquainted with most of the American botanists of his time. As his companion during his travels in Europe, she met many distinguished foreign botanists of that generation as well as some of the botanists of a still earlier generation.

== Early life ==
Jane Lathrop Loring was born in Boston, Massachusetts, August 27, 1821. Her parents were Charles Greely Loring, the lawyer, and Anna Pierce Brace of Litchfield, Connecticut. Her siblings were Caleb William Loring (1819–1897), Susan Mary Loring (1823–1905), and Charles Greely Loring Jr. The philanthropist, Charles Loring Brace, was Jane's cousin.

== Career ==
She first became acquainted with her future husband in 1844, while he was delivering a course of lectures at the Lowell Institute in Boston. They were married on May 4, 1848; they had no children. During the rest of her long life, she lived at the Asa Gray House in the Harvard University Botanic Garden where all botanists were received with hospitality.

Never robust and during much of her life an invalid, Gray was nevertheless able to endure the fatigues of travel. She accompanied her husband twice to California and went with him to Mexico in her later years. She also went with him to England in 1850, sailing in a packet boat, as the longer voyage was expected to benefit her health, and later they made several other trips to Europe, the last being in 1887 shortly before Prof. Gray's death, January 30, 1888.

After her husband's death, Gray led a quiet life always interested in botanists and their work and always glad to see visiting botanists until with advancing years she was forced to live in retirement. For several years, she was absorbed in the arrangement of her husband's correspondence and edited the Letters of Asa Gray, which appeared in 1893 in two volumes. The Gray Herbarium, which had become the property of Harvard University, had but a slight endowment, wholly inadequate to provide for its care and development. In 1899, however, the announcement was made of an anonymous offer of US$20,000 to found an Asa Gray Professorship of Systematic Botany, a position to be united with the curatorship of the Gray Herbarium. The offer was made conditional on the raising of at least US$30,000 as a Gray Memorial Fund for the further endowment of the Gray Herbarium. The required sum was raised, but even the university authorities were in ignorance of the name of the person who had made the offer. It was Mrs. Gray, who, by her very substantial gift, awakened the new interest and initiated the movement which led in later years to a much more effective endowment of the herbarium which he founded.

== Personal life ==
In religion, Gray was Unitarian.

Gray's last days were passed with her family.

Jane Loring Gray died July 29, 1909, at Beverly, Massachusetts. The funeral services were held in the old house in Cambridge.

== Selected works ==
Letters of Asa Gray, vol. 1, 1893

=== Editor ===
- Letters of Asa Gray, edited by Jane Loring Gray, Volume 1 (1893) (text)
- Letters of Asa Gray, edited by Jane Loring Gray, Volume 2 (1893) (text)
