= Jane Lewers Gray =

Northern Ireland-born American poet and hymnwriter (1796–1871)

Jane Lewers Gray (1796–1871) was an Irish-born American poet and hymnwriter of the Romantic era. While Weaver (1906) claimed, "As a writer of strictly religious poetry, Mrs. Gray is, in our estimation, almost unrivalled", Hart (1873) remarked that, "She is one of the sweetest singers among our second-class lyrists." Selections from the Poetical Writings of Jane Lewers Gray (1872) was published posthumously.

== Early life and education ==
Jane Lewers was a daughter of William Lewers, Esquire, of Castleblayney, (Note: Griswold refers to William Lewers as being from Castle Clayney.) in Ireland. He was a ruling elder in the Presbyterian Church. Her brother, Rev. James Lewers, was for many years (circa 1839–1855) pastor of the Musconetcong Valley Church, near New Hampton, New Jersey and afterwards at Catasauqua, Pennsylvania until his death, about 1867.

She received a careful and religious education at the Moravian seminary of Gracehill, near Ballymena.

== Career ==
Soon after leaving the Seminary, she married the Rev. John Gray (d. 1868), of the Presbyterian Church. In 1820, she embarked with her husband for the U.S. After a stormy passage for more than six months, they landed on the island of Bermuda from which she subsequently sailed for the British Province of New Brunswick. After a residence there of 18 months, they removed to New York City. In September, 1822, her husband was called to the pastorate of the First Presbyterian Church of Easton, Pennsylvania, which important position he continued to occupy for 45 years. He received the degree of D.D. from a U.S. college.

All of Gray's published pieces were written in Easton. Gray endeared herself to her husband's congregation. Her piety was exemplified in a continuous course of faith and good works. Her "Sabbath Reminiscences" are descriptive of real scenes and events connected with the church of which her father was an elder. "Parting Hymn", written by Gray and addressed to Rev.George Junkin, was sung by the choir of the First Presbyterian Church at this close of his farewell sermon delivered in that church previous to his departure from Easton. The plaintive hymn, "Hark to the solemn bell", was contributed by her to the Presbyterian Collection of Psalms and Hymns of 1843. One of her effusions was published in an English periodical as exhibiting a favorable specimen of "American poetry". Others, without her knowledge, were translated and published in other countries.

== Style and themes ==
Gray was described as a truthful and pleasing writer. Most of her poetry was of a religious character. Her sympathy and affection were said to lead her to write, furnish the subject and location of her poems, and to some degree control her imagination. Religion, "Native Country", "Warm Friends", and "Beauty" are prominent themes in her work. Her language was described as pure and well chosen, with a language of feeling peculiar to herself. Her poetry was characterized as not studied or labored, but as the poetry of feeling, and a faithful exhibition of her own character. She was said to have a delicate conception of the beautiful and a warmth of expression characteristic of her own speech.

Gray's effusions were all of a serious cast. Her "Sabbath Reminiscences" is a vivid picture of persons and places in her affectionate memory. It was published in an English periodical, as presenting a favorable specimen of American poetry. In speaking of these a writer remarked: "We will not trust ourselves to speak the fervent praises its heart-melting simplicity awakes; but to us it is far more useful than the most learned and could eloquent sermon be upon the fourth commandment.

"Morn", in imitation of "Night", by James Montgomery, of Sheffield, was published without the writer's knowledge in England, where it was so highly appreciated as to be translated into other languages. Montgomery, in a letter to Dr. Rev. Gray, remarked, "The critics who have mistaken the beautiful stanzas, 'Morn', for mine, have done me honor; but I willingly forego the claim, and am happy to recognize a sister-poet in the writer."

== Death and legacy ==
Jane Lewers Gray died, at Easton, Pennsylvania, November 18, 1871, at the age of 76. She and her husband were both buried in the First Presbyterian Church churchyard.

After her decease, a volume of her poems, entitled, Selections from the Poetical Writings of Jane Lewers Gray, was printed for private distribution, New York, 1872.

== Selected works ==
- Selections from the Poetical Writings of Jane Lewers Gray, 1872 (text)
