= John Hale House =

Historic house in Massachusetts, United States

Coordinates: 42°32′57″N 70°52′27″W

- Reverend John Hale House
- U.S. National Register of Historic Places
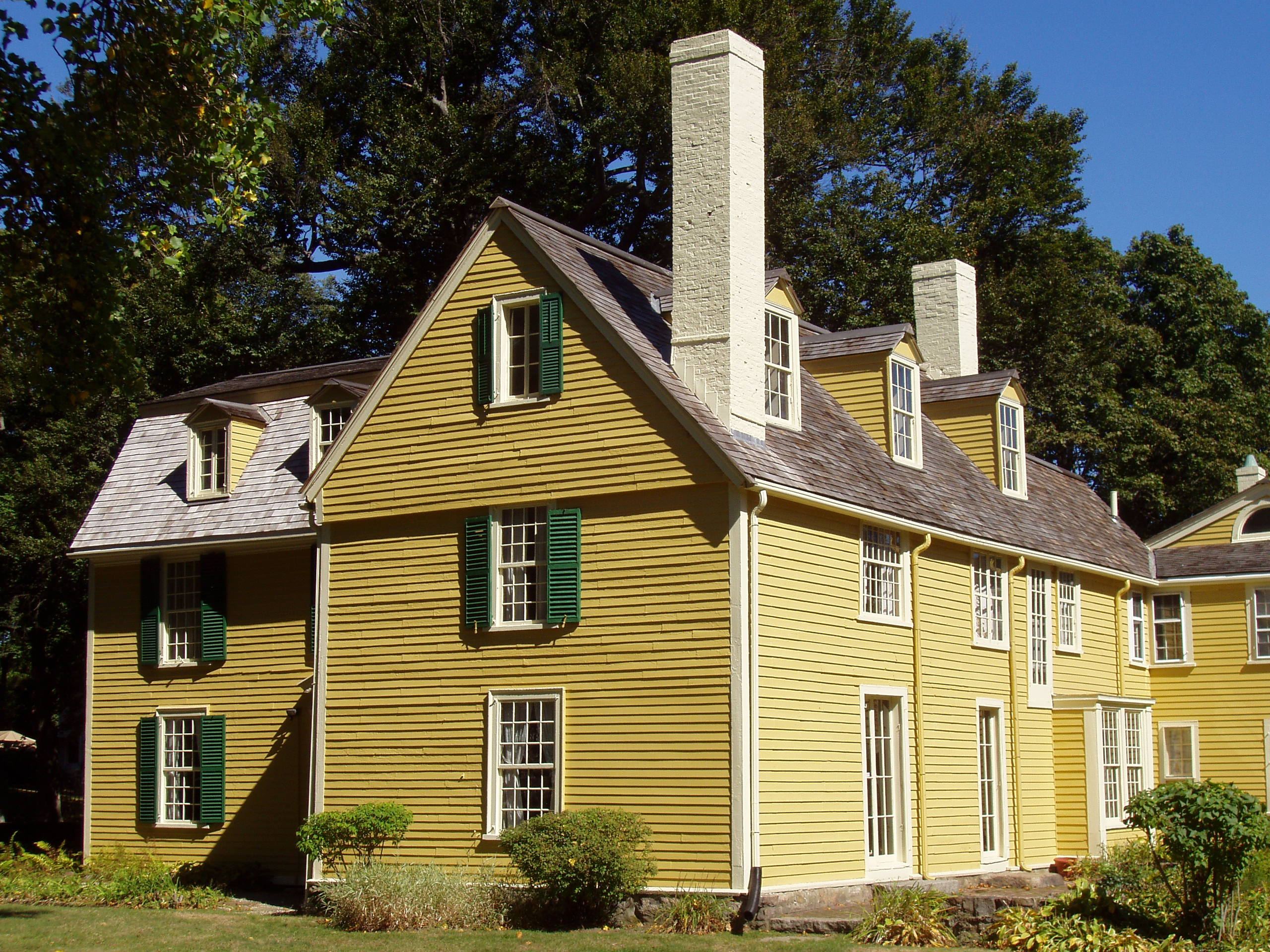

- Location within Massachusetts Location within the United States
- Location: 39 Hale St; Beverly, Massachusetts
- NRHP reference No.: 74000364
- Added to NRHP: October 9, 1974

The John Hale House (c. 1694), also known as the Rev. John Hale Farm, is a historic Colonial house located at 39 Hale Street, Beverly, Massachusetts. The house is now operated as a nonprofit museum by Historic Beverly, with period furnishings and a room containing witchcraft-related artifacts.

This house was built in 1694, possibly with structural members from an earlier parsonage, by Beverly's first minister, Rev. John Hale (1636–1700). Hale is now best remembered for playing a significant part in the infamous Salem witch trials in 1692. He had been at the forefront of the prosecutions but underwent a change of heart when his second wife Sarah Noyes Hale was accused of witchcraft. She was not convicted, and shortly thereafter the trials concluded. After his wife's death in 1697, Rev. Hale wrote a book entitled A Modest Inquiry into the Nature of Witchcraft, condemning his colleagues who played leading roles in the trials.

Rev. Hale lived in this house until his death on May 15, 1700. Generations of descendants succeeded him in the house, until in 1937 they finally sold it to the Beverly Historical Society & Museum. Over the years the house was much altered from its original state. Additions include a 1745 gambrel-roofed ell facing Hale Street that now contains the main entrance.

Descendants of Reverend Hale still remain in Beverly.

== See also ==
- National Register of Historic Places listings in Essex County, Massachusetts
