= Charles Greely Loring (general) =

American military officer and museum curator (1828–1902)

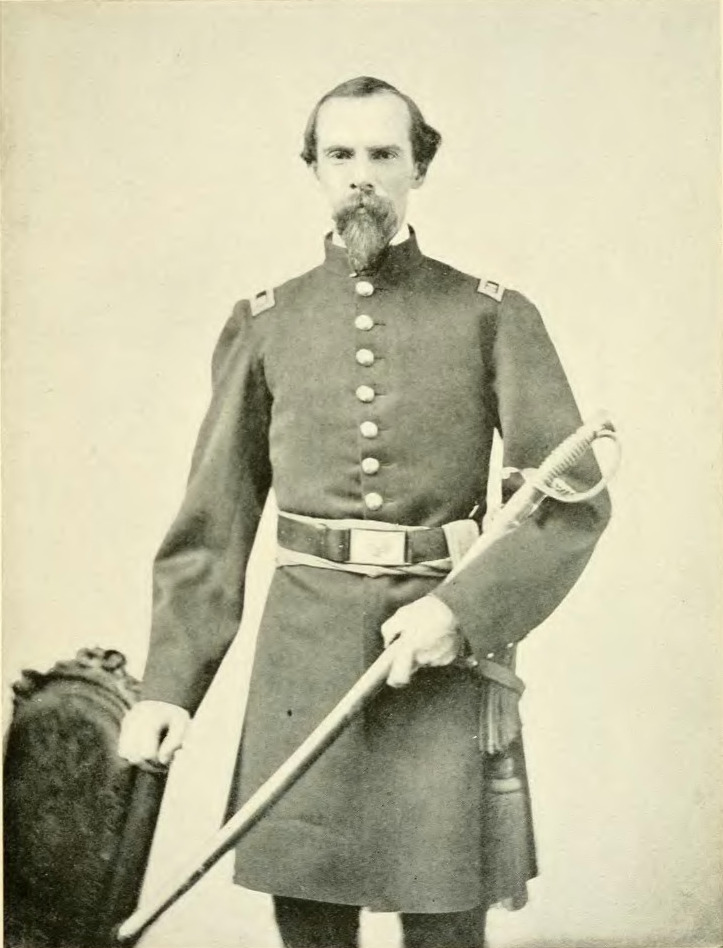
- Born: December 26, 1828; Boston, Massachusetts, U.S.
- Died: August 18, 1902 (aged 73); Beverly, Massachusetts, U.S.
- Burial place: Mount Auburn Cemetery, Cambridge, Massachusetts, U.S.
- Spouse: Mary Hopkins (m. 1875)
- Relatives: Charles Greely Loring Sr. (father); Charles Greely Loring III (son); Jane Loring Gray (sister)
- Military career
- Allegiance: United States
- Branch: Union Army (Volunteers)
- Service years: 1861–1865
- Rank: Lieutenant Colonel; Bvt. Major General
- Unit: Ninth Army Corps
- Conflicts: American Civil War: Siege of Knoxville; Battle of the Wilderness; Battle of Spotsylvania; Battle of Bethesda Church; Battle of the Crater

Signature
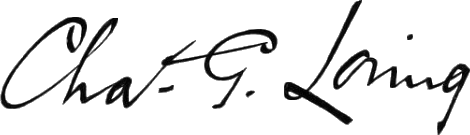

Charles Greely Loring Jr. (December 26, 1828 – August 18, 1902) was an American military officer who attained the rank of brevet major general in the Union Army during the Civil War. He later served as curator and director of the Museum of Fine Arts, Boston.

== Biography ==
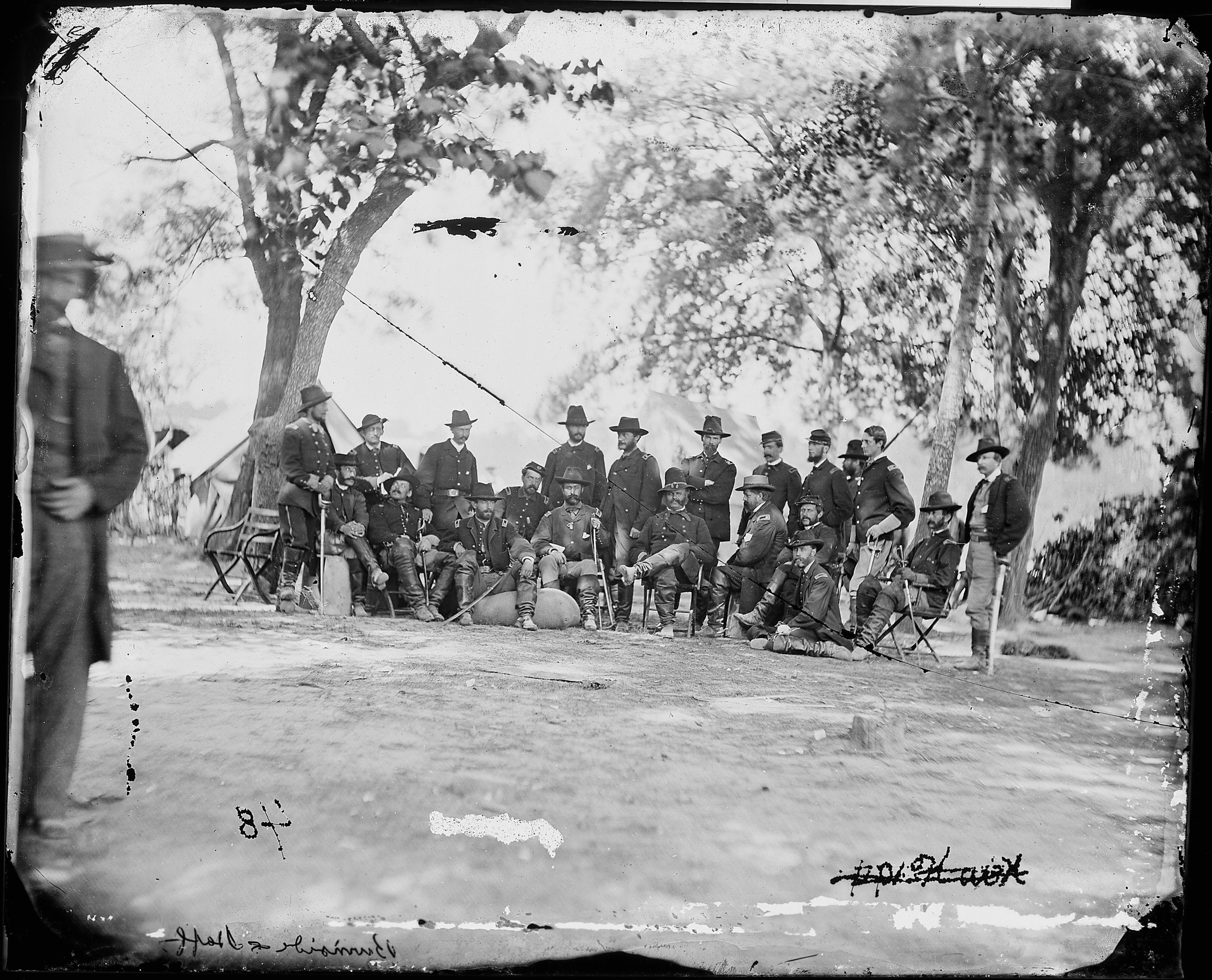
A photograph by Mathew Brady of General Ambrose Burnside and his staff—Loring is standing behind Burnside (seated with legs crossed) looking directly at the camera

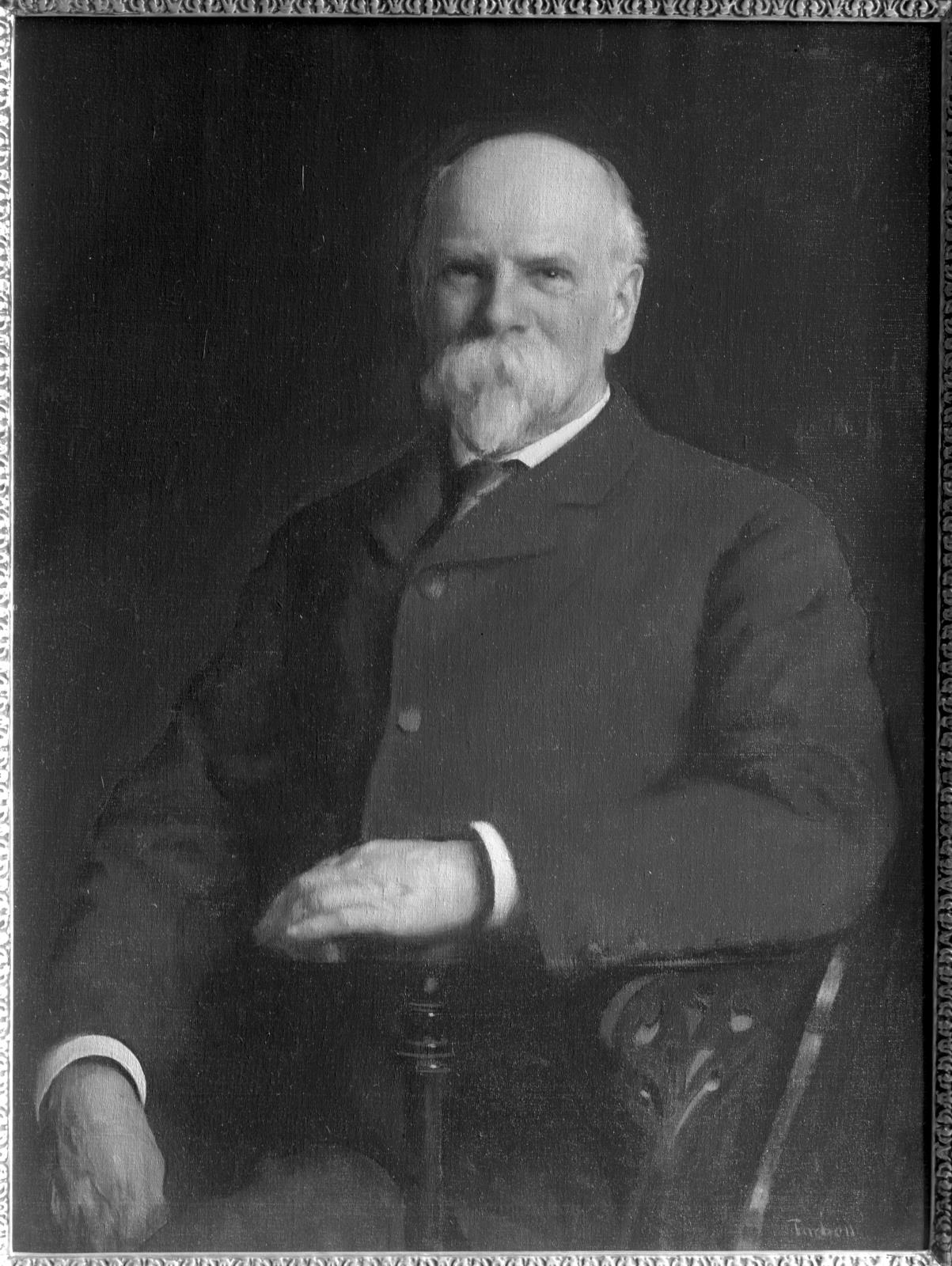
A painting of Loring in his later years by Edmund C. Tarbell

=== Early years ===
Loring was born in Boston in 1828. His father, also named Charles Greely Loring, was a lawyer who served one term in the Massachusetts Senate. The younger Loring was educated at Boston Latin School and then attended Harvard, where he received an undergraduate degree in 1848 and a Master of Arts degree in 1851. Over the next decade, he traveled internationally including visits to Scotland, Spain, Egypt, the Sinai Peninsula, Arabia Petraea, Palestine, Constantinople, Greece, and Paris. He had at least two bouts of unspecified serious illness, and spent time attending to his family's summer home and farm in Beverly, Massachusetts.

=== Military service ===
Following the First Battle of Bull Run in July 1861, Loring joined the United States Volunteers and received an appointment to the staff of General Ambrose Burnside at the rank of first lieutenant. In February 1862, Loring was promoted to captain and was assistant quartermaster on Burnside's staff. In July 1862, Burnside's command was reorganized as the Ninth Army Corps, with Loring as one of seven staff officers. Loring remained with the Ninth through the end of the war. He held the rank of lieutenant colonel by the Battle of the Crater on July 30, 1864, and on August 1 received brevets to colonel and brigadier general, highlighting his "gallant and meritorious services" at the Siege of Knoxville, Battle of the Wilderness, Battle of Spotsylvania, and Battle of Bethesda Church. After the Surrender of Lee in April 1865, Loring received his third and final brevet, to major general in July, highlighting his overall services during the war; he left the army the following month.

=== Museum career ===
In 1868–1869, Loring again visited Egypt. Through Charles Callahan Perkins, Loring undertook organizing a new collection of Egyptian antiquities at Boston's Museum of Fine Arts in 1872 and became a trustee of the museum in 1873. He was given executive oversight of the museum in 1876, initially with the title of curator, then from 1887 with the title of director. He oversaw two expansions to the museum, in 1878 and 1888. Loring resigned his post early in 1902 due to declining health, and was subsequently named director emeritus by the museum's trustees.

In addition to his long association with the Museum of Fine Arts in Boston, Loring was a fellow of the American Academy of Arts and Sciences and a member of the Massachusetts Historical Society.

=== Personal life ===
Loring married Mary Hopkins of Catskill, New York, in 1875. The couple had a daughter and two sons; one died in infancy, and the other, Charles Greely Loring III, became an architect. In 1895, Loring had a summer home built in Chocorua, New Hampshire. He died at his family's home in Beverly in August 1902, aged 73. His funeral service at King's Chapel in Boston was conducted by Edward Everett Hale. A drawing of Loring by James E. Kelly is in the collection of the Smithsonian American Art Museum.

== See also ==
- List of American Civil War brevet generals (Union)
