= Charles Greely Loring (architect) =

American architect

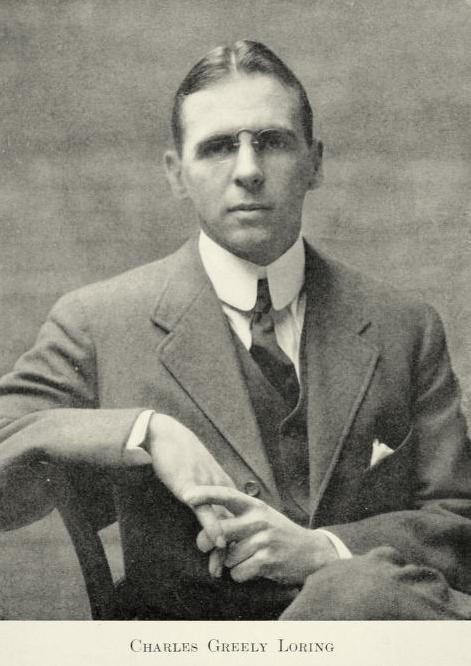
- Loring, c. 1917
- Born: October 23, 1881; Beverly, Massachusetts, U.S.
- Died: September 3, 1966 (aged 84); Concord, Massachusetts, U.S.
- Resting place: Mount Auburn Cemetery, Cambridge, Massachusetts
- Education: Harvard, MIT
- Occupation: Architect
- Years active: c. 1912 – c. 1958
- Spouse: Katharine A. Page (m. 1915; died 1956)
- Children: 3
- Father: Charles Greely Loring

Charles Greely Loring III (October 23, 1881 – September 3, 1966) was an American architect based in Boston.

== Biography ==
Loring's father, also named Charles Greely Loring, was a Union Army general during the Civil War. The younger Loring graduated from Harvard in 1903 and from the Massachusetts Institute of Technology in 1906, where he was a member of Chi Phi. After briefly working for Guy Lowell, Loring studied at Beaux-Arts de Paris, passing the entrance exam in February 1907. He subsequently worked as an architect, first for Cass Gilbert in New York City, then at a firm he co-founded in Boston in 1912, Loring & Leland. Loring & Leland were architects of the Francis Buttrick Library in Waltham, Massachusetts, which is listed on the National Register of Historic Places. Loring was also member of St. Botolph Club, a private social club in Boston. The Loring & Leland partnership ended in 1919.

In 1915, Loring married Katharine A. Page, the daughter of Walter Hines Page, then the U.S ambassador to the United Kingdom. The wedding ceremony took place at St James's Palace in London and was attended by H. H. Asquith, then the Prime Minister, and Edward Grey, then the British Ambassador to the U.S. Katharine died in 1956.

During World War II, Loring headed a Massachusetts group responsible for camouflaging buildings considered possible aerial bombing targets. Shortly after the war, he was the architect for a new "temporary" terminal building that opened at Logan Airport in Boston in May 1946. In 1947, he was the architect for another building at the airport, reworking an existing hangar for use as an international terminal.

Loring was the architect for various public buildings, including the library in Beverly, Massachusetts; a fire station in Reading, Massachusetts; and the building now known as Old Somersworth High School in Somersworth, New Hampshire, which is also listed on the National Register of Historic Places. Loring remained professionally active as late as 1958, designing a telephone exchange building in Williamstown, Massachusetts. He died in 1966 in Concord, Massachusetts, and was survived by three children.

== See also ==
- George F. Loring (1851–1918), a distant relative who was also an architect based in Boston
- New Hampshire Historical Marker No. 280: The Hilltop School “Dedicated to Citizenship”
