= List of New Hampshire historical markers (226–250) =

- «201–225 251–275»

This page is one of a series of pages that list New Hampshire historical markers. The text of each marker is provided within its entry.

Contents
No.	Title	Location	Coordinates
226	Jonathan Myrick Daniels 1939–1965	Keene	42.9333°N 72.28033°W
227	The Nansen Ski Jump	Milan	44.532692°N 71.168039°W
228	Cork Plain Bridge – Second NH Turnpike	Antrim	43.080126°N 71.917491°W
229	Granny Stalbird 1755–1845	Jefferson	44.411616°N 71.473478°W
230	Robert Frost in Allenstown / Buck Street Mills	Allenstown	43.15876°N 71.40593°W
231	Norris Cotton Statesman 1900–1989	Warren	43.92515°N 71.89137°W
232	The Homestead Woolen Mills Dam	Swanzey	42.871729°N 72.327544°W
233	Zealand and James Everell Henry	Carroll	44.26543°N 71.49924°W
234	US Route 1 Bypass of Portsmouth, NH (1940)	Portsmouth	43.0739762°N 70.78149°W
235	Belmont Mill / Saving the Belmont Mill	Belmont	43.444137°N 71.48287°W
236	Concord's Civil War Mustering Camps	Concord	43.21185°N 71.516°W
237	East Candia: The Langford District / Candia: One Town, Five Villages	Candia	43.048°N 71.24913°W
238	The Pennacook	Concord	43.223199°N 71.526747°W
239	The Gilford Outing Club, 1946–1992	Gilford	43.555821°N 71.39828°W
240	Abraham Lincoln Speaks in New Hampshire	Exeter	42.98110896°N 70.9468184°W
241	Downtown Enfield Village	Enfield	43.64145°N 72.146°W
242	Ice Harvesting in Wolfeboro	Wolfeboro	43.5975°N 71.19917°W
243	Mount Kearsarge and the U.S.S. Kearsarge	Warner	43.28098613°N 71.81673258°W
244	Revolutionary War Drummer William Diamond	Peterborough	42.88025078°N 71.93751912°W
245	Pike Tract, Beginning of the WMNF	Benton	44.00359°N 71.93176°W
246	Noyes Academy	Canaan	43.3956°N 72.233°W
247	The Bell of Hampstead Meetinghouse	Hampstead	42.87533045°N 71.17932194°W
248	The First House Site in Sandwich	Sandwich	43.7932°N 71.4146°W
249	Crawley Falls Road Bridge	Brentwood	42.97826979°N 71.07265302°W
250	Pembroke Street / Watering Trough	Pembroke	43.15850272°N 71.46863489°W
Notes • References • External links

== Markers 226 to 250 ==
=== 226. Jonathan Myrick Daniels 1939–1965 ===
City of Keene

Location: 44 West Street (at St. James Street)

"Civil rights activist Daniels worshiped at St. James Episcopal Church during his high school years. Born in Keene, he graduated from Virginia Military Institute before entering the Episcopal Theological School in Cambridge, MA. While studying for the priesthood, he went south to assist with voter registration. On August 20, 1965 in Hayneville, AL, Daniels was shot and killed as he stepped in front of a young African-American coworker, saving her life. His funeral was held at St. James."

=== 227. The Nansen Ski Jump ===
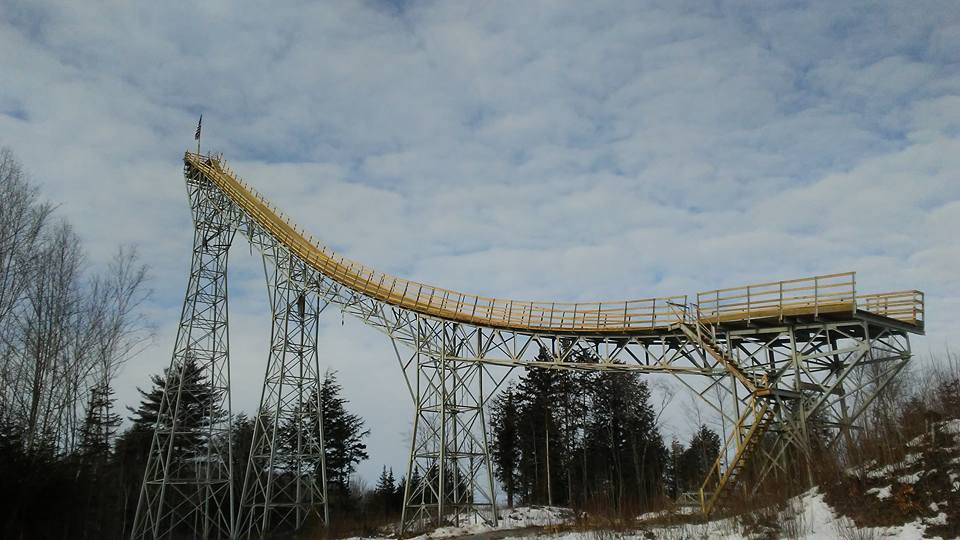
Nansen Ski Jump after restoration, early 2017

Town of Milan

Location: NH 16 near Berlin–Milan town line

"Named for Fridtjof Nansen, the Greenland explorer, Berlin's first ski club formed in 1872. The club sponsored the 'Big Nansen' constructed in 1936–38 by the National Youth Administration and the City of Berlin. At the time, it was possibly the tallest steel-tower ski jump in the world, standing 171 feet high. The first jumper was Clarence 'Spike' Oleson in 1937. In 1938, the Olympic trials were held here. Four times Milan hosted the United States Ski Jumping National Championships: 1940, '57, '65, '72."

=== 228. Cork Plain Bridge – Second NH Turnpike ===
Town of Antrim

Location: U.S. Route 202 at mile marker 30.3 (near Old Concord Road)

"This Contoocook River crossing was established by the Second New Hampshire Turnpike Corporation, chartered in 1799 to build a toll highway sixty miles from Amherst to Claremont. (Note: Present-day New Hampshire Route 31 and New Hampshire Route 47 incorporate parts of the original Second New Hampshire Turnpike. See also List of turnpikes in New Hampshire.) Opened in 1801 and made free in 1837, the turnpike joined rich Connecticut River Valley farms with Massachusetts markets. Named for the wide plain to the south, (Note: Cork Plain lies within the town of Deering.) a steel Warren Truss bridge of late 19th or early 20th century design stood here until 2009."

=== 229. Granny Stalbird 1755–1845 ===
Town of Jefferson

Location: 110 Meadows Road (NH 115A)

"Known as Granny Stalbird, Deborah Vicker came through Crawford Notch c.1796 as cook for Col. Joseph Whipple. (Note: Colonel Joseph Whipple of Jefferson (1738–1816) is a different person than the like-named Colonel Joseph Whipple of Rhode Island, who died in 1746.) It is said she brought the first bible to the north country. She married Richard Stalbird and settle on land deeded to her by Whipple in payment for her service. She became the region's 'doctress,' a traveling herbalist who learned native wisdom about plants and healing. Stories of her knowledge, bravery and dedication to settlers of this new frontier are part of the history of White Mountain settlement."

=== 230. Robert Frost in Allenstown / Buck Street Mills ===
Frost's "The Quest of the Orchis" as published in The Independent of New York City on June 27, 1901

Town of Allenstown

Location: West side of NH 28 (Pinewood Road) (north of entrance to Bear Brook State Park)

Note: The marker has different text on each side.

"In the summer of 1896, aspiring post Robert Frost (1874–1963) and his wife Elinor spent a belated honeymoon in a rented cottage near the Suncook River in Allenstown. Carl Burell, a high school friend and avid naturalist, was foreman at the Moulton box shop at Buck Street dam. Botany walks with Burell awakened Frost to the natural world, coloring his later writings. Frost recalled these walks in 'The Quest of the Orchis' (1901). Burell's 1896 injury in a mill accident inspired Frost's poem, 'The Self-Seeker'."

"A bridge was built at 'Buck Street,' by the 1750s. Natural falls were dammed to power saw and grist mills before 1767. The 19th c. added a water-powered fulling mill for cleansing wool cloth by 1813, a bedstead shop by 1845, a spoke shop in the 1850s and twine mills. By the 1890s, the dams powered Charles Fisher's axe handle factory and Reuben C. Moulton's box and trunk shop. Then known as East Pembroke, the area had a post office, store, blacksmith shop, houses and workers' tenements."

=== 231. Norris Cotton Statesman 1900–1989 ===
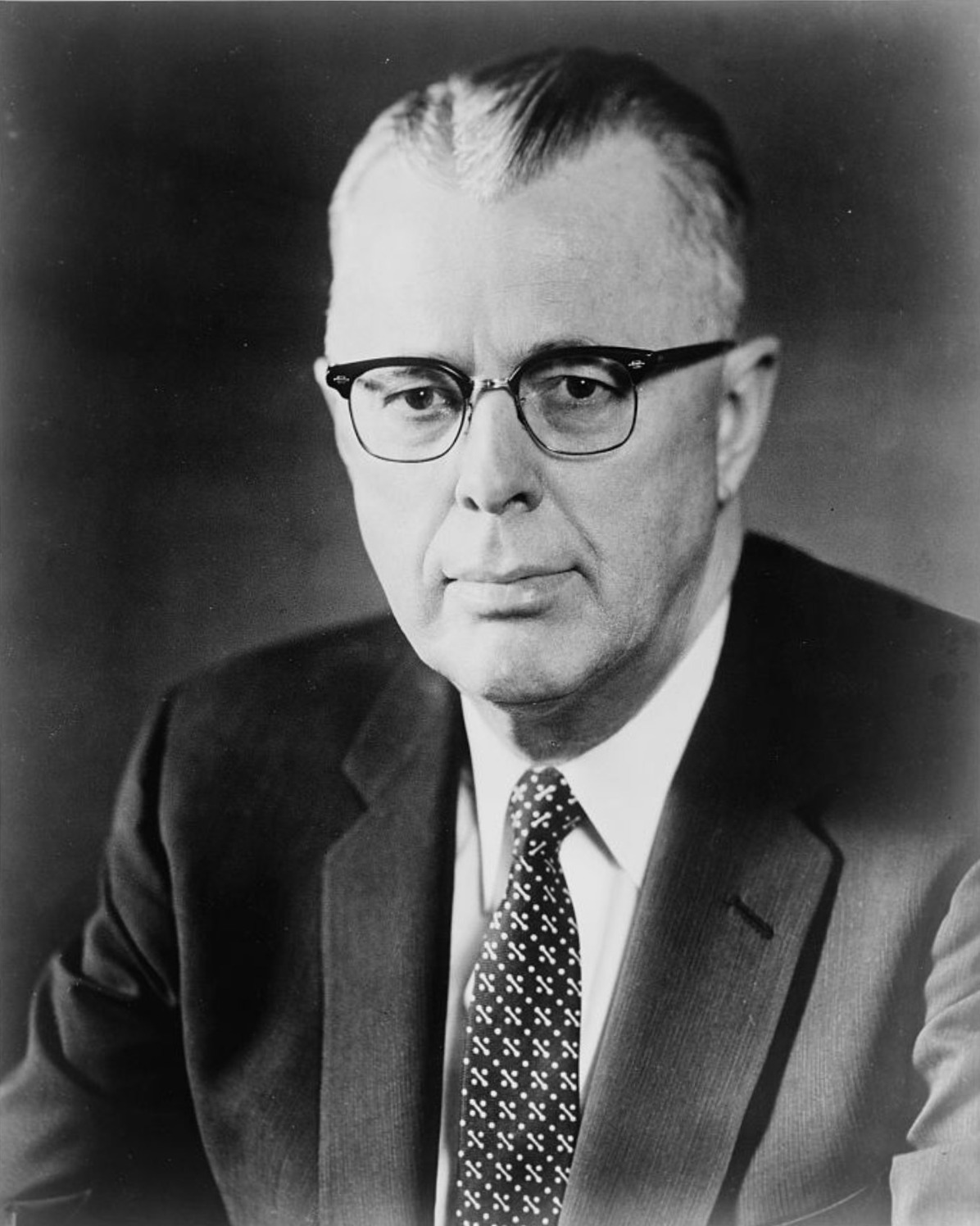
Norris Cotton

Town of Warren

Location: Water Street at Warren Historical Society

"In 1975 Norris Cotton celebrated 50 years of elected public service, having served in both the state legislature and Congress. Born in Warren in 1900, Cotton worked his way through Phillips Exeter Academy and Wesleyan University before being elected to the State House in 1922. In 1947 he began writing weekly reports from Congress to his constituents, published in local newspapers. His humble beginnings, rise to power, and consistent connection to New Hampshire's people embodied an American way of life."

=== 232. The Homestead Woolen Mills Dam ===
Town of Swanzey

Location: Main Street at West Swanzey Covered Bridge (Note: Wording in the state's listing mentions NH 10, which is located 1,400 feet (430 m) west.)

"The Homestead Woolen Mills Dam on the Ashuelot River was a rock-filled, timber crib dam, a common dam type in the 19th century. It was originally built in the 1850s to power woolen and woodenware mills. In the late 19th century it served the Stratton Mills and the West Swanzey Mfg. Co. Homestead Woolen Mills, Inc., took over the buildings and dam in 1911. The company employed many residents of the area until it closed in 1985. The dam was used only for water control after the 1920s until its removal in 2010."

=== 233. Zealand and James Everell Henry ===
Town of Carroll

Location: U.S. Route 302 at Zealand Road

"The village of Zealand grew up in 1875 to serve the logging industry. Henry owned 10,000 acres in the heart of the White Mtns., with a 10-mile railroad to move logs from forest to sawmill. The village had a post office, school, store, housing, and charcoal kilns to eke out every bit of forest value. Depending on the season, the logging business employed 80–250 men. By 1885, Henry left the Valley moving on to Lincoln, leaving the area mostly clear cut. From 1886–1903, fires destroyed the valley and village."

=== 234. US Route 1 Bypass of Portsmouth, NH (1940) ===

City of Portsmouth

Location: Portsmouth Traffic Circle at State Liquor Store

"The Bypass was part of a major New Deal project to move U.S. Route 1 traffic away from the congested streets of downtown Portsmouth. The Bypass created a second Piscataqua River crossing into Maine via the Interstate (Sarah M. Long) Bridge. The highway's wide divided lanes and grade separations were the first in the state, earning it the title 'New Hampshire's Most Modern Highway.' Today, the U.S. Route 1 Bypass is one of the oldest signed bypasses in the country's numbered route system."

=== 235. Belmont Mill / Saving the Belmont Mill ===
Town of Belmont

Location: NH 140 (Depot Street) at Tioga River bridge

Note: The marker has different text on each side.

"The Gilmanton Village Manufacturing Co., under the leadership of Gov. William Badger, built the Belmont Mill in the 1830s. It first produced cotton cloth, but was converted to hosiery knitting in 1865. In 1885, it had the largest annual production of hosiery in NH. With major renovation and mechanization in the 1920s, the Belmont Hosiery Co. was famous for its full-fashioned hosiery, distributed worldwide. The last stocking was knit in 1970, after over a century of local manufacturing in Belmont."

"Mostly abandoned in the 1970s, the mill suffered a devastating 1992 fire. In 1995, the mill was on the verge of demolition when citizens fought to explore re-use options. After a charrette conducted by Plan NH, federal funding restored the roof to its 1830s design, and helped rehabilitate facade and interiors. Press rededication reports in 1998 called the building's new era as town and community center the 'Miracle in Main Street.'"

=== 236. Concord's Civil War Mustering Camps ===
City of Concord

Location: Loudon Road (NH 9) near Airport Road (at New Hampshire National Guard building)

Note: The front of the marker begins with the below quote and continues with the noted text; the marker's other side is a list of specific regiments.

" 'We can have but "one country, one Constitution and one destiny;" the Union must be preserved.' Gov. Nathaniel S. Berry

From May 1861 to December 1864, twelve New Hampshire Civil War regiments and a cavalry unit mustered on 'The Plains' and other nearby locations in Concord. Here they gathered to equip, train, and await orders, living in tents or temporary barracks. 32,486 soldiers from NH served in the war, which cost the state at least 4,840 lives, more than 1% of the population. 21 soldiers from NH units were awarded the Medal of Honor, established 1861."

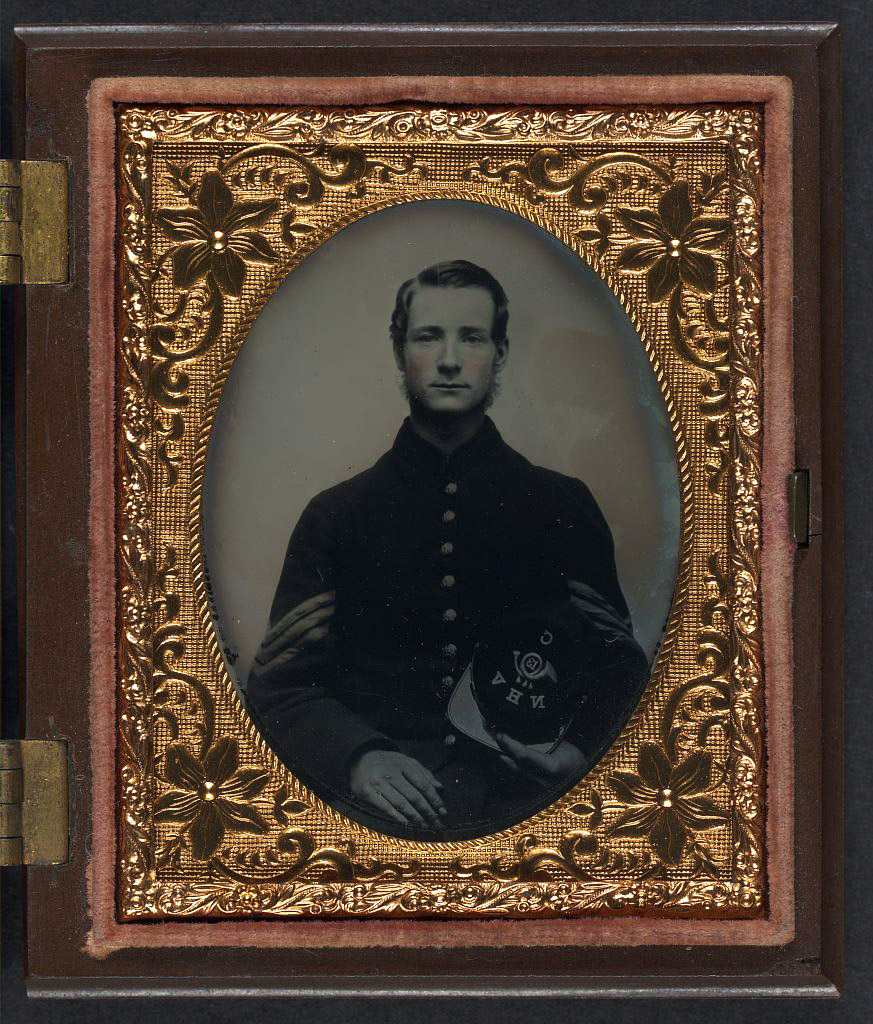
An unidentified sergeant with the 13th New Hampshire Volunteer Infantry Regiment

"1st Regiment N.H. Volunteer Infantry
3rd Regiment N.H. Volunteer Infantry
5th Regiment N.H. Volunteer Infantry
9th Regiment N.H. Volunteer Infantry
11th Regiment N.H. Volunteer Infantry
12th Regiment N.H. Volunteer Infantry
13th Regiment N.H. Volunteer Infantry
14th Regiment N.H. Volunteer Infantry
15th Regiment N.H. Volunteer Infantry
16th Regiment N.H. Volunteer Infantry
17th Regiment N.H. Volunteer Infantry (Note: 17th New Hampshire failed to complete organization; its two companies were transferred to 2nd New Hampshire.)
18th Regiment N.H. Volunteer Infantry
1st Regiment N.H. Volunteer Cavalry"

=== 237. East Candia: The Langford District / Candia: One Town, Five Villages ===
Town of Candia

Location: Intersection of Langford Road and Depot Road

Note: The marker has different text on each side.

"East Candia was a dense neighborhood of workers' housing developed around the local shoe industry in the 1850s, exemplifying a late-19c. industrial economy made possible by the arrival of the Portsmouth and Concord Railroad in 1852. The area's most significant growth came after 1855, when the first of two mechanized shoe factories opened. The new prosperity resulted in a building boom in the popular Stick Style, characterized by decorative trusses in gable ends, many in porches and door hoods, still visible today."

"The town of Candia developed five distinct village centers, each with a strong visual character and identiry. The Hill remains the most picturesque and was the site of the 1763 town meetinghouse and school lot. The Village was a diverse 19th c. mill complex on the North Branch River. Bean's Island was established around a mill in 1872. Candia Depot sprang up with the 1851 arrival of the Portsmouth-Concord Railroad. East Candia was created around the local shoe industry. These five centers made up the town of Candia."

=== 238. The Pennacook ===
City of Concord

Location: College Drive at NHTI campus

"When Europeans settled in New England in the 1620s, the largest Native American tribal group in the future state of New Hampshire used the flat lands and bends of the Merrimack River in present Concord for its central village. Named 'Pennacook', which means 'at the falling bank', they were a branch of the Abenaki. The Pennacook were allied with other tribal groups in the Merrimack watershed and owed allegiance to the sagamore Passaconaway. Once numbering in the thousands, by the 1720s only a remnant of the group remained in the area."

=== 239. The Gilford Outing Club, 1946–1992 ===
Town of Gilford

Location: NH 11A at 143 Cherry Valley Road

"Established by local families, the Gilford Outing Club provided all-seasons outdoor recreation for local children through parent volunteering. Particularly well-known for ski instruction, the Club trained hundreds of children including three Olympic athletes: Marty Hall, Dick Taylor, and medalist Penny Pitou. The Club operated from this site from 1950 until it disbanded in 1992. Donated to the town in 1994 by Gary and Lucille Allen's family, the land and buildings still serve to provide outdoor recreation for the town."

=== 240. Abraham Lincoln Speaks in New Hampshire ===
Town of Exeter

Location: Front Street (NH 111) at town hall

"On March 3, 1860, Abraham Lincoln delivered his final of four speeches in New Hampshire at Exeter Town Hall. Lincoln had strong ties to Exeter due to the influence of Amos Tuck, of this town, who is credited with the creation of the Republican Party. Both men served in Congress from 1847–1850. It was at the suggestion of Tuck that Lincoln enrolled his son, Robert, in Phillips Exeter Academy. Both Lincoln and Tuck promoted free-state policies and opposed the extension of slavery into the western territories."

=== 241. Downtown Enfield Village ===
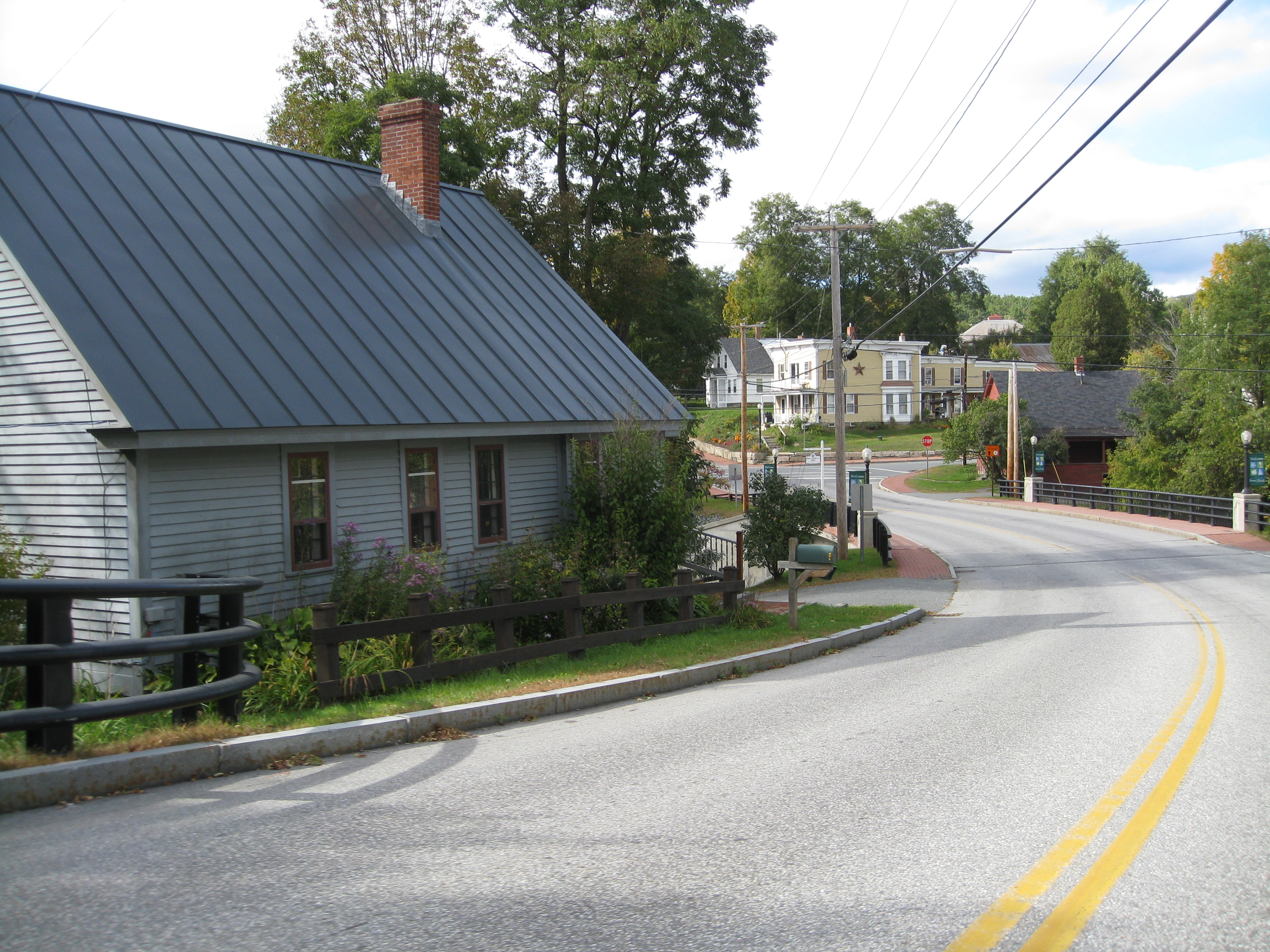
Enfield Village Historic District

Town of Enfield

Location: Main Street west of Mascoma River crossing, next to municipal parking lot (Note: Wording in the state's listing mentions U.S. Route 4, which is located 450 feet (140 m) north.)

"This village, formerly called North Enfield, grew around mills powered by the Mascoma River. In the 1840s, railroad service and economic investment by the Enfield Shakers laid the foundation for its growth as a mill village that prospered over the next 100 years. The village's connection with the Shakers is a defining element of its economic and cultural history. In 2010, downtown Enfield Village was listed in the National Register of Historic Places."

=== 242. Ice Harvesting in Wolfeboro ===
Town of Wolfeboro

Location: NH 28 just north of Birch Road

"Natural ice was harvested in the Lakes Region. Goodwin Basin and Crescent Lake, visible across the road, and Lake Wentworth were local sources. In 1895, Alonso Avery set up an ice house near Crescent Lake. In 1913 a warm winter caused an ice shortage in Boston, and ice was shipped from NH by rail. Locally, ice was delivered to family ice chests, businesses, camps, and lake cruisers. Refrigeration technology in the 1930s decreased the need for natural ice. The last family ice business, Moody's, closed in 1965."

=== 243. Mount Kearsarge and the U.S.S. Kearsarge ===
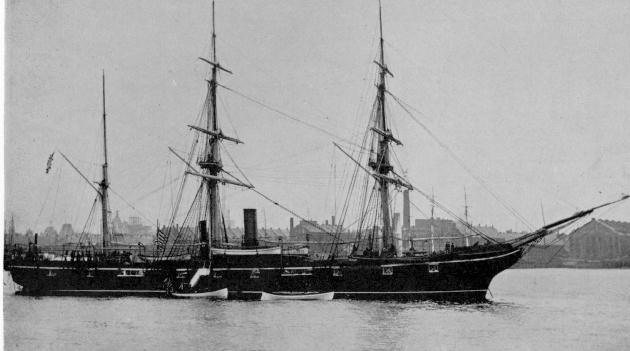
The first USS Kearsarge

Town of Warner

Location: Intersection of NH 103 and Kearsarge Mountain Road

"Three miles from here looms Mt. Kearsarge, elev. 2,937 ft. Since the Civil War, four U.S. Naval vessels have been named 'Kearsarge'. (Note: Another ship initially named Kearsarge was renamed Hornet prior to launch (CV-12).) The first, a 1,550-ton sloop of war built largely of oak timber from the Mt. Kearsarge foothills, earned fame under the command of Capt. John Winslow when it sank the CSS Alabama near Cherbourg, France in 1864. In 1992, the U.S. Navy christened the newest USS Kearsarge (LHD3), an amphibious assault ship, each of its commissioning crewmembers received a commemorative plank crafted from Mt. Kearsarge red oak trees."

=== 244. Revolutionary War Drummer William Diamond ===
Town of Peterborough

Location: Old Street Road near Second Cemetery

"Born in Boston on July 21, 1755, Diamond was a wheelwright by trade. He learned the art of drumming from a British soldier. April 19, 1775, he was part of the guard of Rev. Jonas Clarke's Lexington, MA house, where John Hancock and Samuel Adams were meeting. Paul Revere's alert that British troops were coming prompted Capt. John Parker to have Diamond beat the call to arms, sounding the start of the American Revolution. (Note: The William Diamond Middle School in Lexington, Massachusetts, is named in his honor.) Diamond died in 1828 and is buried here in Peterborough's Second Cemetery with many Revolutionary War vets."

=== 245. Pike Tract, Beginning of the WMNF ===
Town of Benton

Location: NH 25 at mile marker 14.6

"The US Forest Service purchased 7,022 acres of timber-covered mountain slopes, cliffs, streams, ponds, and abandoned farmland from Haverhill businessman E. Bertram Pike on January 2, 1914. The purchase was the first acquisition towards the establishment of the White Mountains National Forest in 1918, a significant accomplishment to restore and protect lands and watersheds from the impact of years or destructive practices. The nearly 800,000-acre WMNF is carefully managed as a working forest, sustaining the health, beauty, and productivity of natural resources."

=== 246. Noyes Academy ===
Town of Canaan

Location: 570 Canaan Street near Historical Society Museum

"Chartered in 1834 by Samuel Noyes and other Canaan citizens, it was the first-known upper-level co-ed school in the US open to African Americans. The school opened in 1835, but months later, outraged opponents used a team of oxen to drag the Academy building down Canaan Street and forced the Black pupils out of town. This brief experiment in educational equality helped launch the public careers of Black leaders Henry Highland Garnet, Alexander Crummell, and Thomas Sipkins Sidney. Garnet was the first African-American to preach in Congress (1865)."

=== 247. The Bell of Hampstead Meetinghouse ===
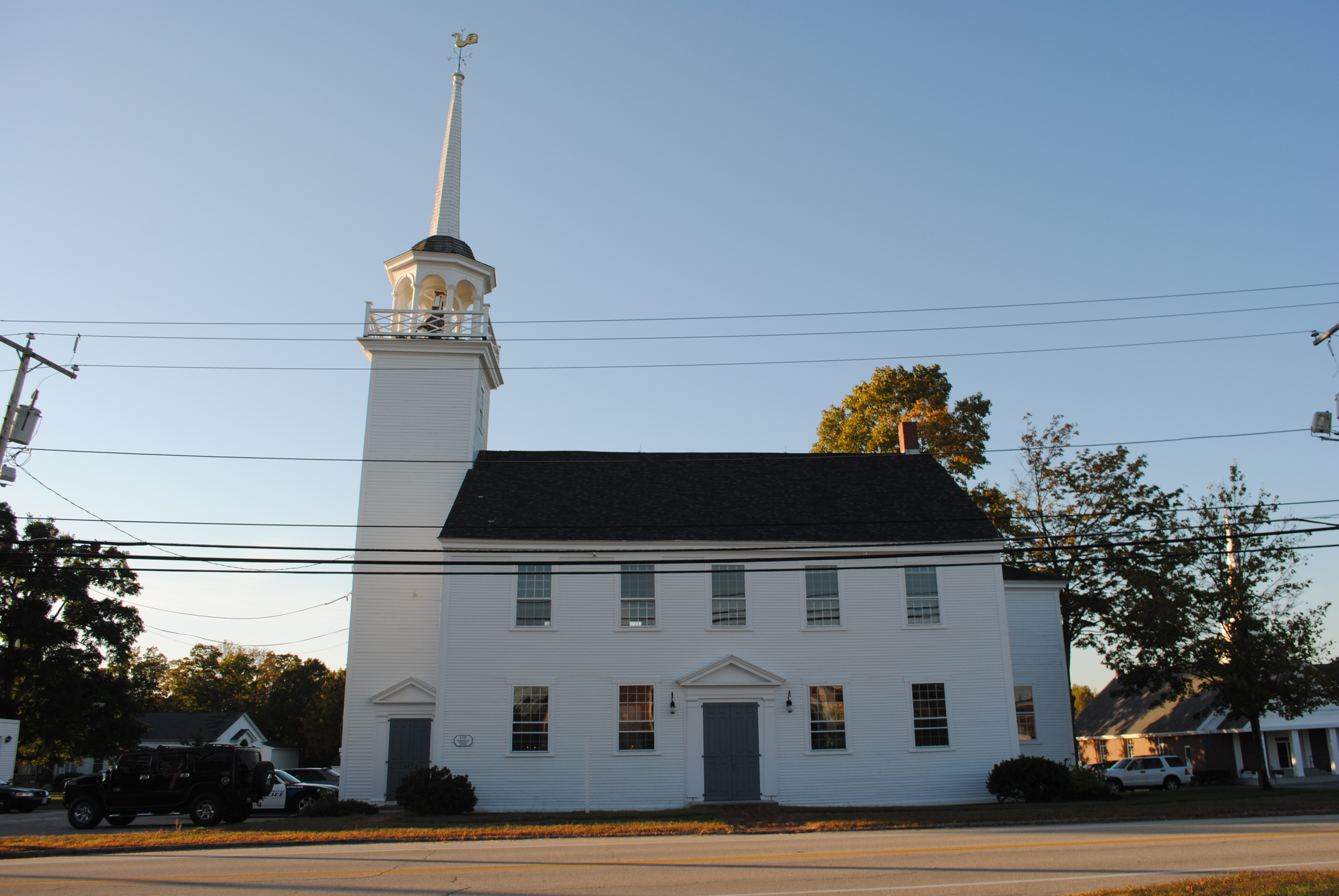
Hampstead Meetinghouse

Town of Hampstead

Location: Emerson Avenue, east of NH 121

"Donated in 1809 by Mr. Thomas Huse, this bell is likely from Paul Revere Jr.'s foundry. The inscription reads, 'The living to the church I call, and to the grave I summons all.' The town elected a bell ringer annually, and the bell was rung for church services, funerals, emergencies, and for many years, to mark the time thrice each day. By local tradition, it is still rung at 12:01 am on the 4th of July each year."

=== 248. The First House Site in Sandwich ===
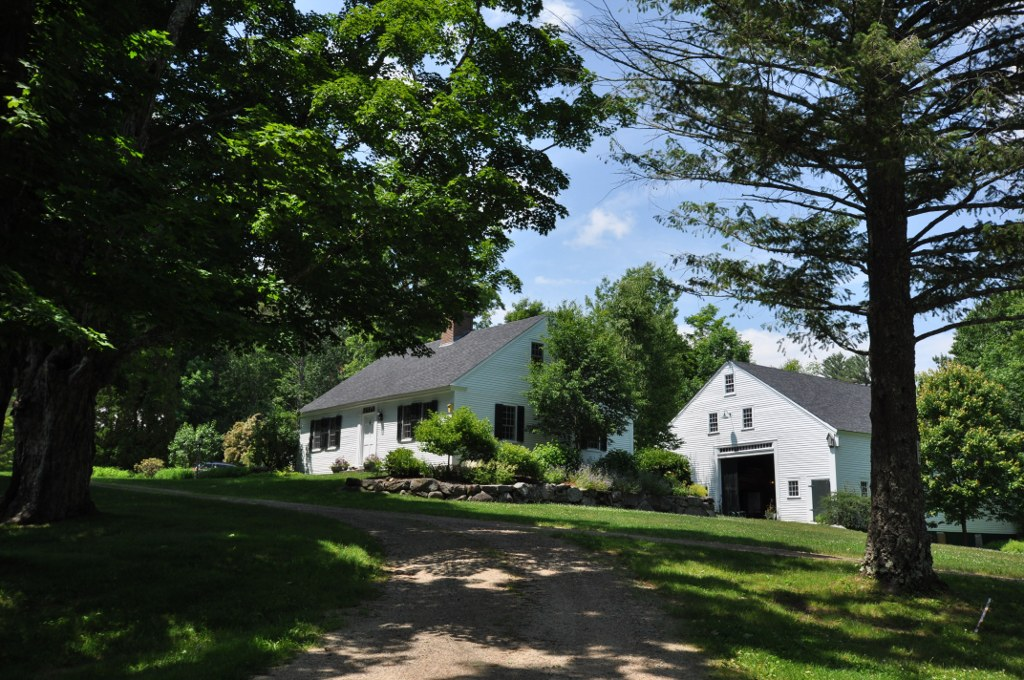
Beede Farm

Town of Sandwich

Location: Across the street from 252 Sandwich Hill Road

"The first house in town was built on this hill. Daniel Beede and 15 men built a log house in Nov. 1767. Beede was a dominant character in the early history of Sandwich, a surveyor, a businessman, the first town clerk and on the first Board of Selectmen. He was Sandwich's delegate in 1775 to the 5th Provincial Congress; Col. John Wentworth was president of the first three. John's grandson, Paul, later owned the Beede farm. Beede died in 1799; he is buried in the cemetery next to the house site."

=== 249. Crawley Falls Road Bridge ===
Town of Brentwood

Location: NH 111A and Crawley Falls Road

"In 1941 NH constructed a concrete rigid-frame bridge to carry NH Route 125 over the Exeter River. This bridge type, used extensively in the 1930s, was a high point in American concrete bridge design. The design used a reinforced joint between the horizontal and vertical members. In this bridge, the steel was bent at right angles at the joint, distributing the load between the members. Bridge designer Clifford Broker (1903–1992), a civil engineer with NH State Highway Dept., had particular expertise in reinforced concrete design and designed over 25 bridges in NH, 7 of this type." (Note: The 1941 bridge was reconstructed in 2014.)

=== 250. Pembroke Street / Watering Trough ===
Town of Pembroke

Location: U.S. Route 3 at Pembroke Hills Road

Note: The marker has different text on each side.

"Pembroke Street is one of several parallel roads laid out when the town was planned between 1730–36. The original large lots along this wide thoroughfare were subdivided into smaller lots for dwellings, meeting houses for Congregationalists and Presbyterians, taverns, stores, schoolhouses, and Pembroke's earliest cemetery, making the street a linear village by 1755. After 1804, Pembroke Street became an extension toward Concord of the Chester Turnpike, a privately built 19-mile toll road connecting Chester and Pembroke." (Note: See also List of turnpikes in New Hampshire.)

"Clean water was essential to the health of horses, particularly on heavily traveled roads and in extreme weather. A state statute of 1858 authorized towns to reimburse private citizens who provided and maintained watering troughs for the use of travelers' horses. In 1884, Pembroke took the added step of providing 'good drinking water for man and beast' at public expense, purchasing this trough from the C. A. Bailey Granite Company in Allenstown for $124 (Note: ($4,443 in 2025)) and adding a bronze drinking fountain for human refreshment."
