= List of New Hampshire historical markers (26–50) =

- «1–25 51–75»

This page is one of a series of pages that list New Hampshire historical markers. The text of each marker is provided within its entry.

Contents
No.	Title	Location	Coordinates
26	The Old Meeting House	Sandown	42.92856°N 71.18698°W
27	Stone Arch Bridge	Stoddard	43.07447°N 72.04516°W
28	First Public School	Hampton	42.9376°N 70.83535°W
29	Old Dunstable	Merrimack	42.86205°N 71.49345°W
30	The Crawford Family	Carroll	44.26314°N 71.45802°W
31	The Chocorua Legend	Tamworth	43.90887°N 71.23431°W
32	Revolutionary Capital	Exeter	42.98092°N 70.94654°W
33	The Ridge	Orford	43.90537°N 72.13686°W
34	Log Drives	Stratford	44.4454°N 71.3741°W
35	Uncle Sam's House	Mason	42.73942°N 71.76503°W
36	Andrew Jackson's Visit	Bow	43.17157°N 71.52707°W
37	George Washington's Visit	Hampton Falls	42.91472°N 70.86504°W
38	White Mountain School of Art	Conway	44.07556°N 71.13951°W
39	Samuel Livermore (1732–1803)	Holderness	43.76065°N 71.67171°W
40	Mason's Patent	Wilmot	43.48252°N 71.97537°W
41	First Roman Catholic Church	Claremont	43.39226°N 72.37613°W
42	The Spaulding Brothers	Rochester	43.30776°N 70.9769°W
43	Levi Woodbury 1789–1851	Francestown	42.98719°N 71.81229°W
44	John Sargent Pillsbury 1828–1901	Sutton	43.31928°N 71.93444°W
45	Mount Washington Cog Railway	Bean's Grant	44.268°N 71.35396°W
46	Josiah Bartlett 1729–1795	Kingston	42.93559°N 71.0541°W
47	Metallak	Stewartstown	44.9751°N 71.43352°W
48	General John Stark 1728–1822	Derry	42.86442°N 71.28921°W
49	Hannah Dustin 1657–1737	Boscawen	43.29019°N 71.59024°W
50	Oyster River... is Layd Waste	Durham	43.13504°N 70.90998°W (approx.)
Notes • References • External links

== Markers 26 to 50 ==
=== 26. The Old Meeting House ===
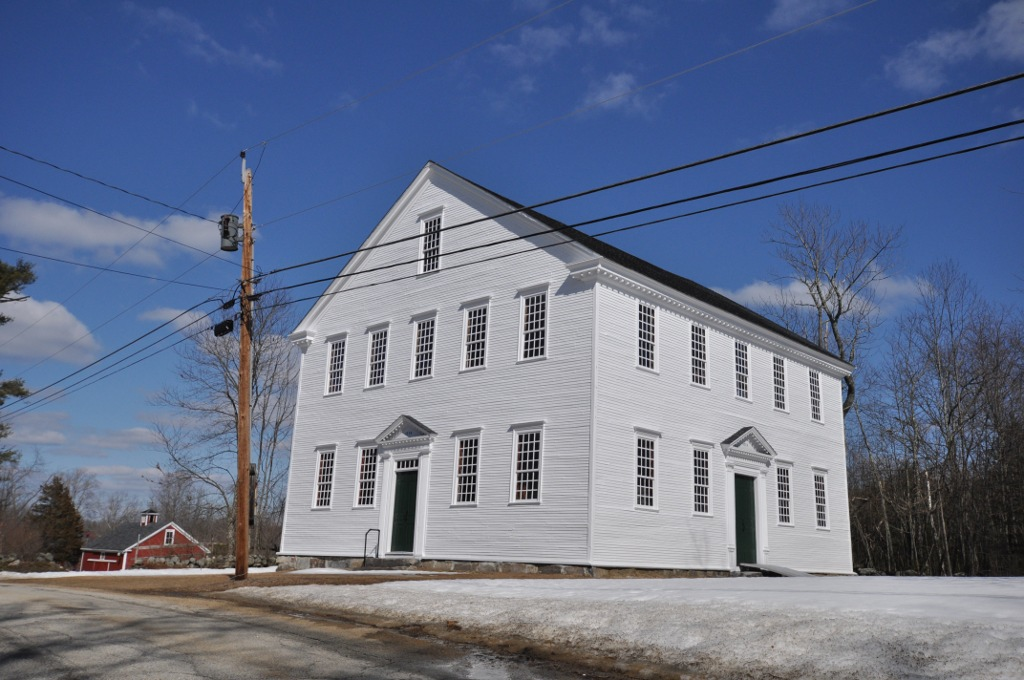
Sandown Old Meetinghouse

Town of Sandown

"The erection of this distinctive type New England Meeting House, located at .3 mile on road to northeast, was begun in 1773 and finished in 1774. A former center of civic and church affairs in Sandown, this excellent example of period architecture is carefully maintained for its historical significance."

=== 27. Stone Arch Bridge ===
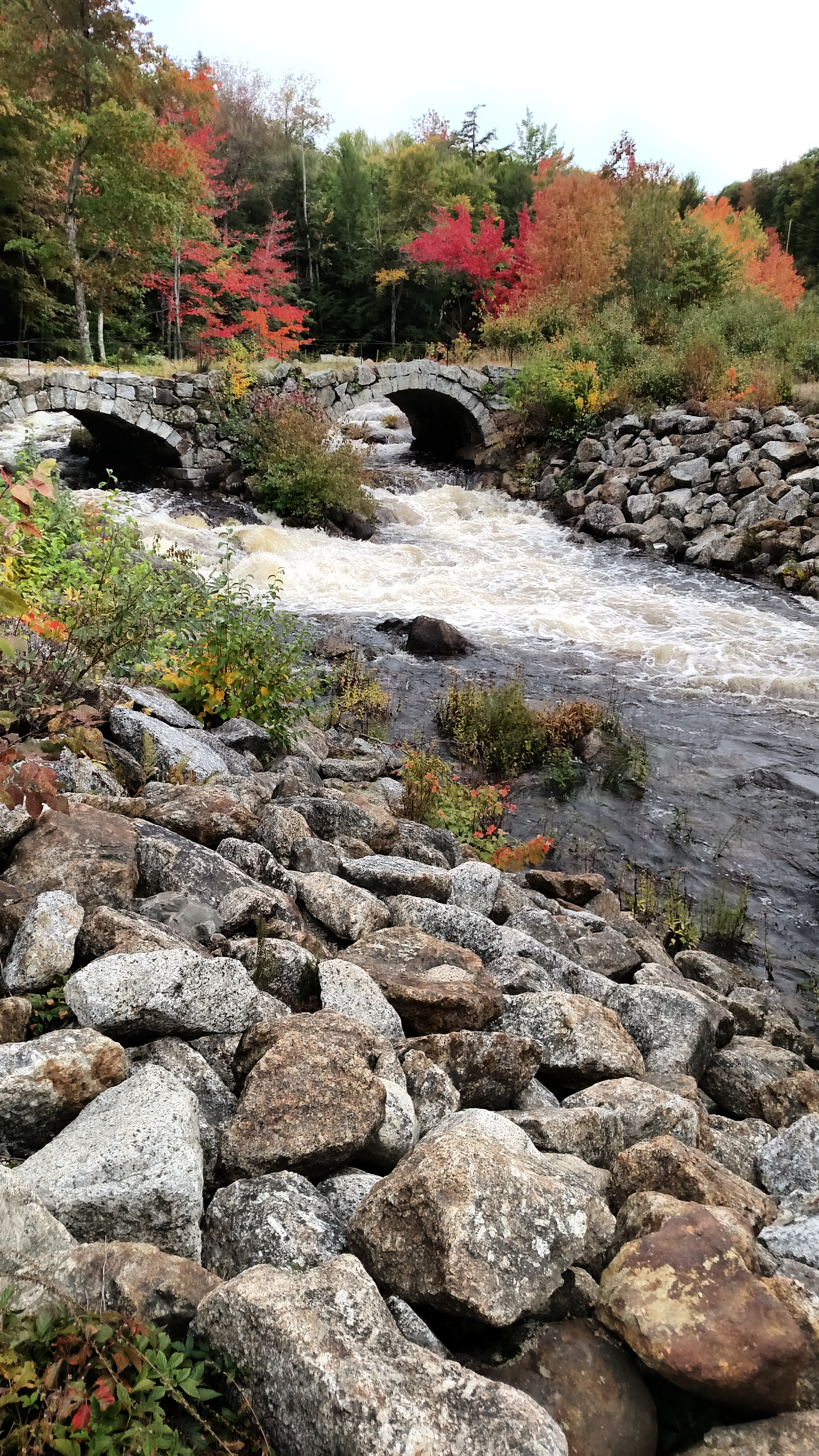
Twin-arch stone bridge in Stoddard

Town of Stoddard

"This twin arch structure, built without mortar and sustained solely by expert shaping of its archstones, is typical of a unique style of bridge construction employed primarily in the Contoocook River Valley in the first half of the Nineteenth Century. These bridges are a significant part of our American architectural heritage."

=== 28. First Public School ===
Town of Hampton

"In New Hampshire, supported by taxation, the first public school opened in Hampton on May 31, 1649. It was presided over by John Legat for the education of both sexes. The sole qualification for admission of the pupils was that they be 'capable of learning.'"

=== 29. Old Dunstable ===
Marker in town of Merrimack

"Was the original town, chartered by Massachusetts Bay Colony in 1673, which embraced parts of New Hampshire and Massachusetts. The New Hampshire portion of this area, following the determination of the province boundary in 1741, was subsequently divided into Hollis, Hudson, Litchfield, Merrimack and Nashua."

=== 30. The Crawford Family ===
Town of Carroll

"For whom the Notch is named, included Abel and his sons Thomas J. and Ethan Allen. They established the first regional hotels and pioneered in opening the White Mountain area to the public. Ethan and his wife, Lucy Howe Crawford, author of an 1846 history of the region, are buried in a nearby cemetery."

=== 31. The Chocorua Legend ===
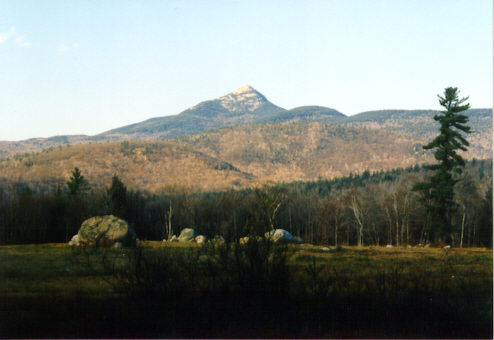
Mount Chocorua

Town of Tamworth

"In several versions the legend's sequence relates the mysterious death of Chocorua's son while in the care of a settler named Campbell. Suspicious of the cause, the Pequawket chieftain took revenge on the settler's family. Then, in retaliation, Campbell killed Chocorua on the peak of the mountain now bearing the Indian's name."

Note: this marker was erected in 1965.

=== 32. Revolutionary Capital ===
Town of Exeter

"Founded by Rev. John Wheelwright in 1638, Exeter was one of the four original towns in the colony. (Note: The first four towns established in New Hampshire were Dover, Exeter, Hampton, and Portsmouth.) Following New Hampshire's provisional declaration of independence on January 5, 1776, it served as the capital of the new state during the period of the American Revolution." (Note: Exeter served as New Hampshire's capital for 14 years.)

Note: this marker was erected in 1965.

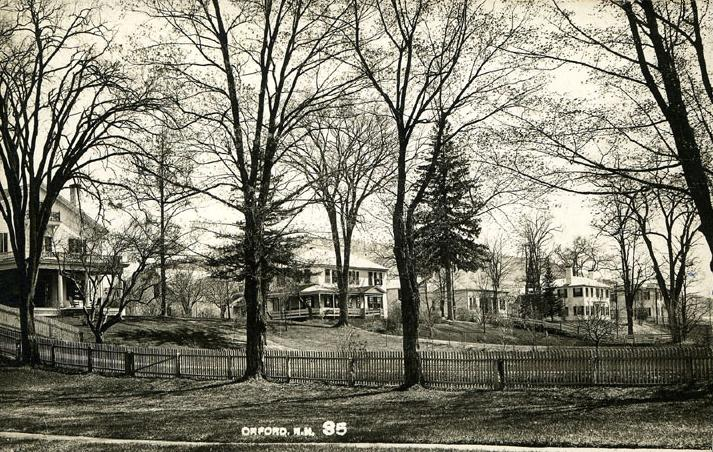
The Ridge in Orford, c. 1912

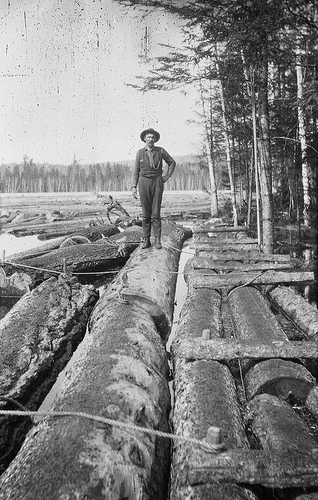
Log driver in the Berlin area

=== 33. The Ridge ===
Town of Orford

"Orford's seven Ridge houses were built over a period of time from 1773 to 1839 by professional and business men of the town. The Bulfinch-style house of John B. Wheeler, built in 1814-1816, southern-most in the row, was designed by a Boston architect, probably Asher Benjamin who was then an associate of Charles Bulfinch. Other Ridge houses also display Asher Benjamin influence."

=== 34. Log Drives ===
Town of Stratford

"The dramatic process of conveying lumber logs and pulpwood from northern New Hampshire forests to manufacturing centers, by driving them down the Connecticut River, spanned the turn into the Twentieth Century. Hardy crews of 'white-water men' risked life and limb in the hazardous work on the annual spring drives."

Note: this marker was erected in 1965. In 2022, this marker was moved from its original location on U.S. Route 3 to the North Stratford River Launch and Picnic Area, as the New Hampshire Division of Historical Resources deemed it "a much more accessible location".

=== 35. Uncle Sam's House ===
Town of Mason

"Nearby stands the boyhood home of Samuel Wilson (1766-1854) who was generally known as 'Uncle Sam'. He supplied beef to the Army in 1812. The brand on his barrel was 'U.S.' The transition from U.S. to Uncle Sam followed and became the popular symbol for the United States."

Note: this marker was erected in 1966.

=== 36. Andrew Jackson's Visit ===
Town of Bow

"Just north of this point, on the boundary between Bow and Concord a large cavalcade of enthusiastic citizens met President Jackson and escorted him to New Hampshire's Capital. His official reception by the State Government on the following day, June 29, 1833, marked the conclusion of a triumphal New England tour."

Note: As of October 2021, this marker was listed as "Retired".

=== 37. George Washington's Visit ===
Town of Hampton Falls

"On his way to Portsmouth after entering New Hampshire on Saturday, October 31, 1789, President Washington accompanied by a splendid procession of the military and state dignitaries, halted for a short time here in Hampton Falls. He greeted and shook hands with a number of soldiers of the Revolution."

=== 38. White Mountain School of Art ===
Marker number 38 in Conway

Town of Conway

"Since Thomas Cole's visit in 1828, New Hampshire's splendid scenery has been an enduring inspiration to countless landscape artists. From 1850 to 1890 this region was particularly favored for their easels. Benjamin Champney (1871-1907), New Hampshire-born painter, described the glorious era in 'Sixty Years of Art and Artists.'" (Note: The full title of Champney's writing about the era is Sixty Years' Memories of Art and Artists.)

Note: this marker was erected in 1966.

=== 39. Samuel Livermore (1732–1803) ===
Town of Holderness

"Proprietor of more than half the Town of Holderness, this jurist, congressman and senator was New Hampshire's first attorney general and second chief justice. In 1788 he spurred the State's approval of the proposed Federal Constitution, thus insuring its ratification and the formation of the present Government of the United States."

Note: this marker was erected in 1966.

=== 40. Mason's Patent ===
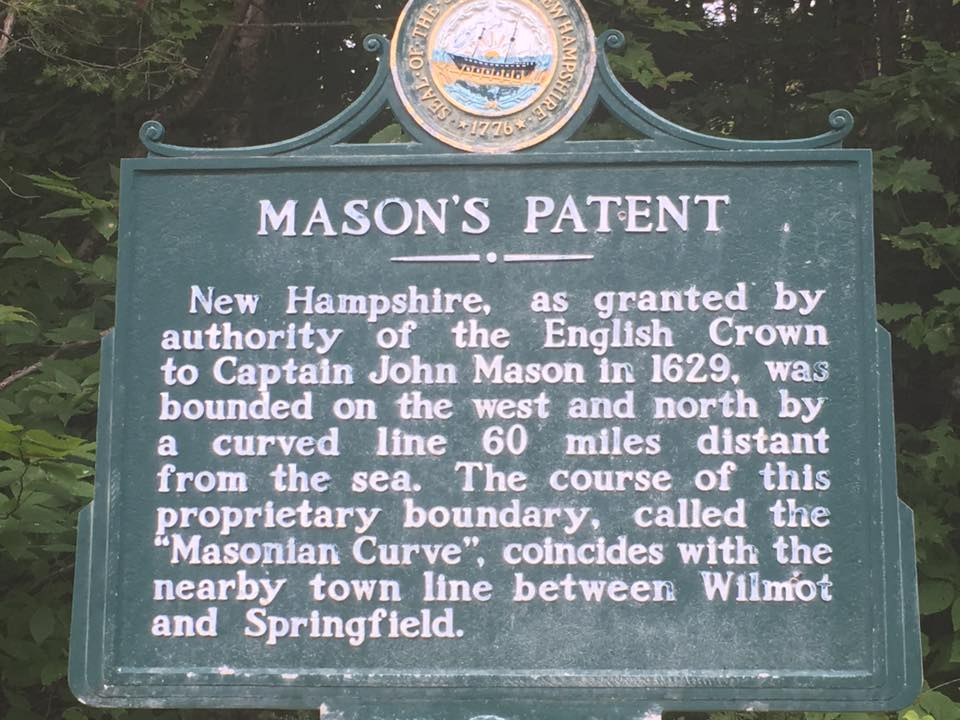
Marker featuring Captain John Mason

Town of Wilmot

"New Hampshire, as granted by authority of the English Crown to Captain John Mason in 1629, was bounded on the west and north by a curved line 60 miles distant from the sea. The course of this proprietary boundary, called the 'Masonian Curve', coincides with the nearby town line between Wilmot and Springfield."

=== 41. First Roman Catholic Church ===
City of Claremont

"Southerly on Old Church Road is located the first Roman Catholic edifice in New Hampshire. It was erected in 1823 under the direction of the Reverend Virgil Horace Barber, S.J. The building serves St. Mary's parish and contained the first Roman Catholic school in the State."

Note: this marker was erected in 1966. Between the title and main text is a directional arrow, rarely seen on the state's markers.

=== 42. The Spaulding Brothers ===
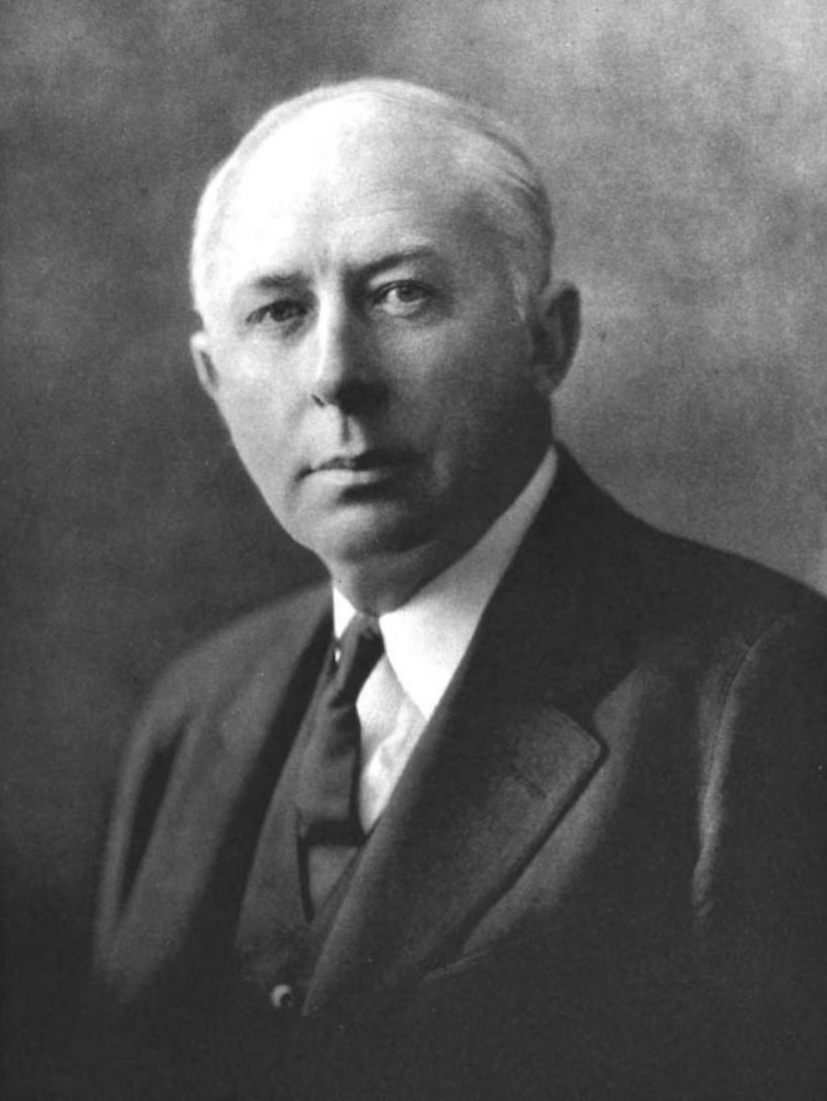
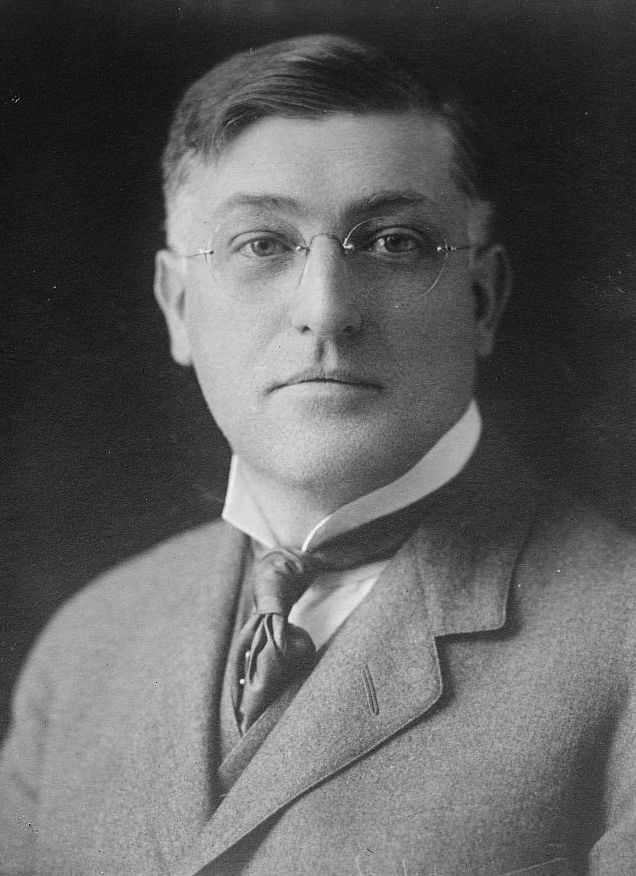
Huntley (left) and Rolland Spaulding

City of Rochester

"At nearby Rochester were the homes of the Spaulding brothers, Huntley N. (1869–1955) and Rolland H. (1873–1942). Both served ably as governors of New Hampshire and in other important posts of public service. They were among the foremost industrialists and philanthropists of their times."

=== 43. Levi Woodbury 1789–1851 ===
Town of Francestown

"Born in Francestown, this ardent Jacksonian rose to hold some of the nation's highest offices. After serving his state as legislator, judge, and Governor, he became U.S. Senator, Secretary of the Navy, Secretary of the Treasury, and U.S. Supreme Court Justice. His record of public service has been unmatched by any other New Hampshire citizen."

=== 44. John Sargent Pillsbury 1828–1901 ===
Town of Sutton

"Born in a house bordering this common, he migrated to Minneapolis in 1855. There, he, his brother George, and his nephew Charles, established the famous Pillsbury flour milling business. Three times elected Governor of Minnesota and noted benefactor of its State University, his career in industry and public service reflects great credit on his native State."

Note: this marker was erected in 1967.

=== 45. Mount Washington Cog Railway ===
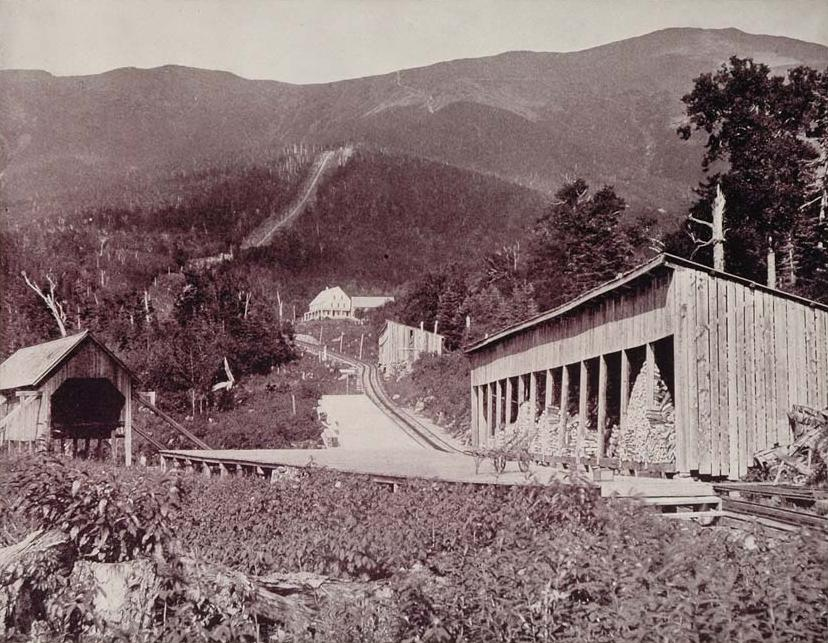
An 1893 view of a portion of the Cog Railway

Township of Bean's Grant

"Completed in 1869 for $139,500, this unique railway was built through the genius and enterprise of Herrick and Walter Aiken of Franklin and Sylvester Marsh of Campton. Over three miles long, the average grade to the 6,293-foot summit is one foot in four. Made safe by toothed wheel and ratchet, it is the second steepest in the world and the first of its type."

=== 46. Josiah Bartlett 1729–1795 ===
Town of Kingston

"Distinguished participant in the founding of the Republic as signer of the Declaration of Independence and Articles of Confederation, and prominent in this State as Chief Justice of two courts and first holder of the title of Governor. An innovator in medicine, he practiced in this town for forty-five years."

Note: this marker was erected in 1967.

=== 47. Metallak ===
Metallak marker in Stewartstown

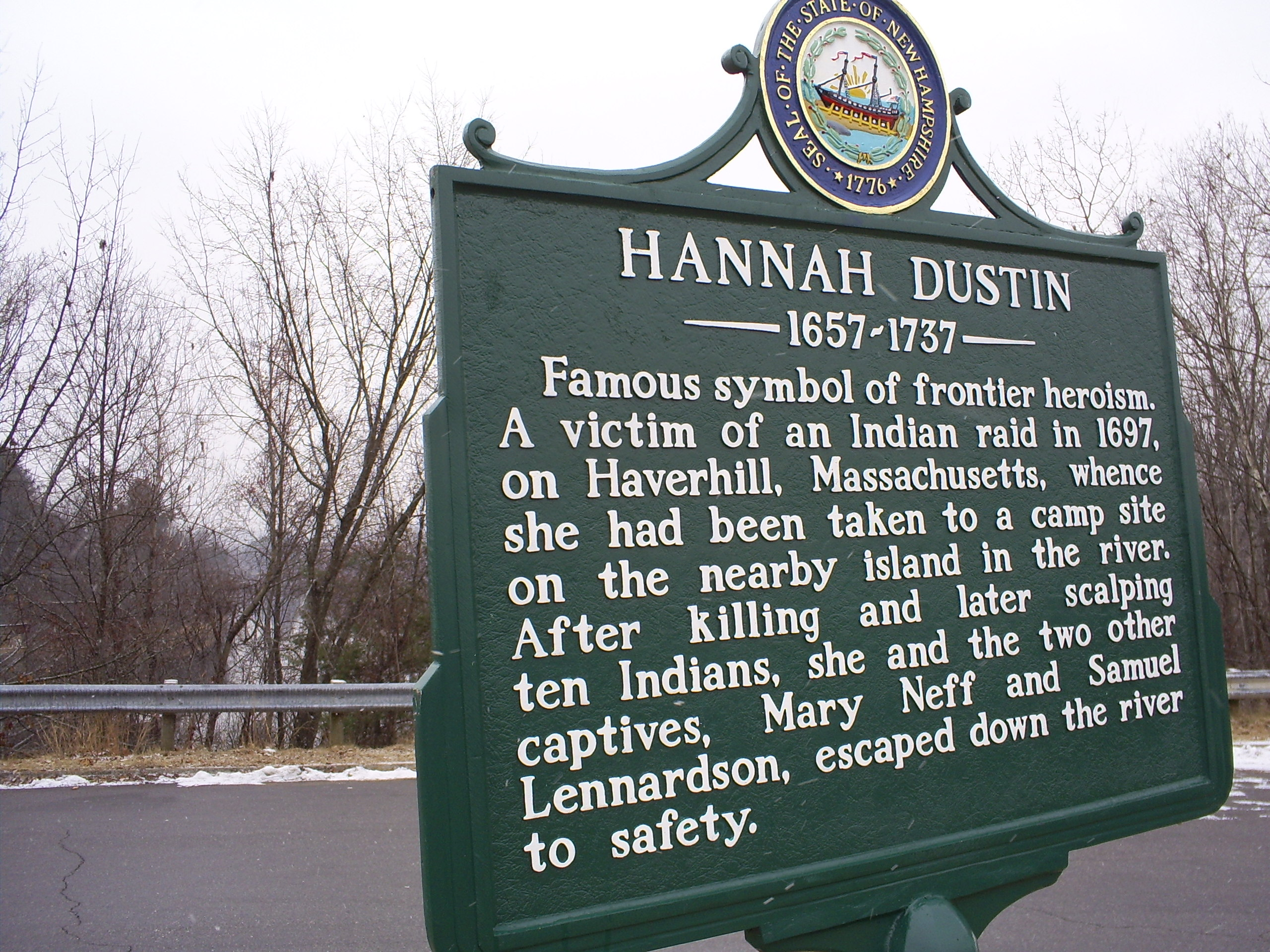
Hannah Dustin marker in Boscawen

Town of Stewartstown

"Hunter, trapper, fisherman and guide, well and favorably known by the region's early settlers. 'The Lone Indian of the Magalloway' was the last survivor of a band of Abnaki inhabiting the Upper Androscoggin. Blinded by accidents, Metallak died a town charge in 1847 at the reputed age of 120. He is buried in the North Hill Cemetery on road to the east."

Note: this marker was erected in 1967.

Note: since April 2024, this marker has been listed as "Out for Repair".

=== 48. General John Stark 1728–1822 ===
Town of Derry

"Rogers' Ranger and Revolutionary hero, served at Bunker Hill and in Washington's New Jersey campaign of 1776-77, and commanded the American militia which decisively defeated two detachments of Burgoyne's army near Bennington, Vermont, August 16, 1777. A stone marks his birthplace on Stark Road, six-tenths of a mile easterly on Lawrence Road."

=== 49. Hannah Dustin 1657–1737 ===
Town of Boscawen

"Famous symbol of frontier heroism. A victim of an Indian raid in 1697, on Haverhill, Massachusetts, whence she had been taken to a camp site on the nearby island in the river. After killing and later scalping ten Indians, she and two other captives, Mary Neff and Samuel Lennardson, escaped down the river to safety."

Note: this marker was erected in 1967.

=== 50. Oyster River... is Layd Waste ===
Town of Durham

This marker has different text on each side:

"On July 18, 1694, a force of 250 Wabanaki, principally Norridgewocks and Penobscots led by Bomazeen and Madockawando, attacked the village of Oyster River. The French persuaded them to break the 1693 Pemaquid Treaty to continue the French war against the English, known as King William's War. Prior to the peace treaty, the Wabanaki had been fighting the English over land encroachment and on behalf of the French, who had no militia. The surprise was complete. More than 100 residents were killed or taken away and most buildings burnt. 'Oyster River ... is layd waste' read the dispatch sent to Boston."

- "12,800 BCE ~ Wabanaki and their ancestors lived here in 'N'dakinna'
- 1635 ~ Village of Oyster River settled by the English
- 1688 to 1699 ~ Second Anglo-Abenaki War
- 1689 to 1697 ~ King William's War
- 1693 ~ Treaty of Pemaquid signed
- 1694 ~ Raid on Oyster River breaks the Treaty of Pemaquid
- 1732 ~ Town of Durham incorporated
- 2017 ~ Durham is the first N.H. town to recognize Indigenous Peoples' Day

Truth and reconciliation are ongoing."

Note: This marker originally had a different title, "Oyster River Massacre", and different text. (Note: The original wording on the marker was: "On July 18, 1694, a force of about 250 Indians under command of the French soldier, de Villieu, attacked settlements in this area on both sides of the Oyster River, killing or capturing approximately 100 settlers, destroying five garrison houses and numerous dwellings. It was the most devastating French and Indian raid in New Hampshire during King William's War.") Starting in 2022, the marker was listed as "Out for Repair" by the New Hampshire Division of Historical Resources. In May 2024, it was reported that "the state’s Commission on Native American Affairs had flagged the sign’s language as problematic and suggested revising it." New wording, as listed above, was reported to be in place by early January 2026; the location of the marker was also changed.
