= East Hampstead, New Hampshire =

Unincorporated community in New Hampshire, United States

- Unincorporated community
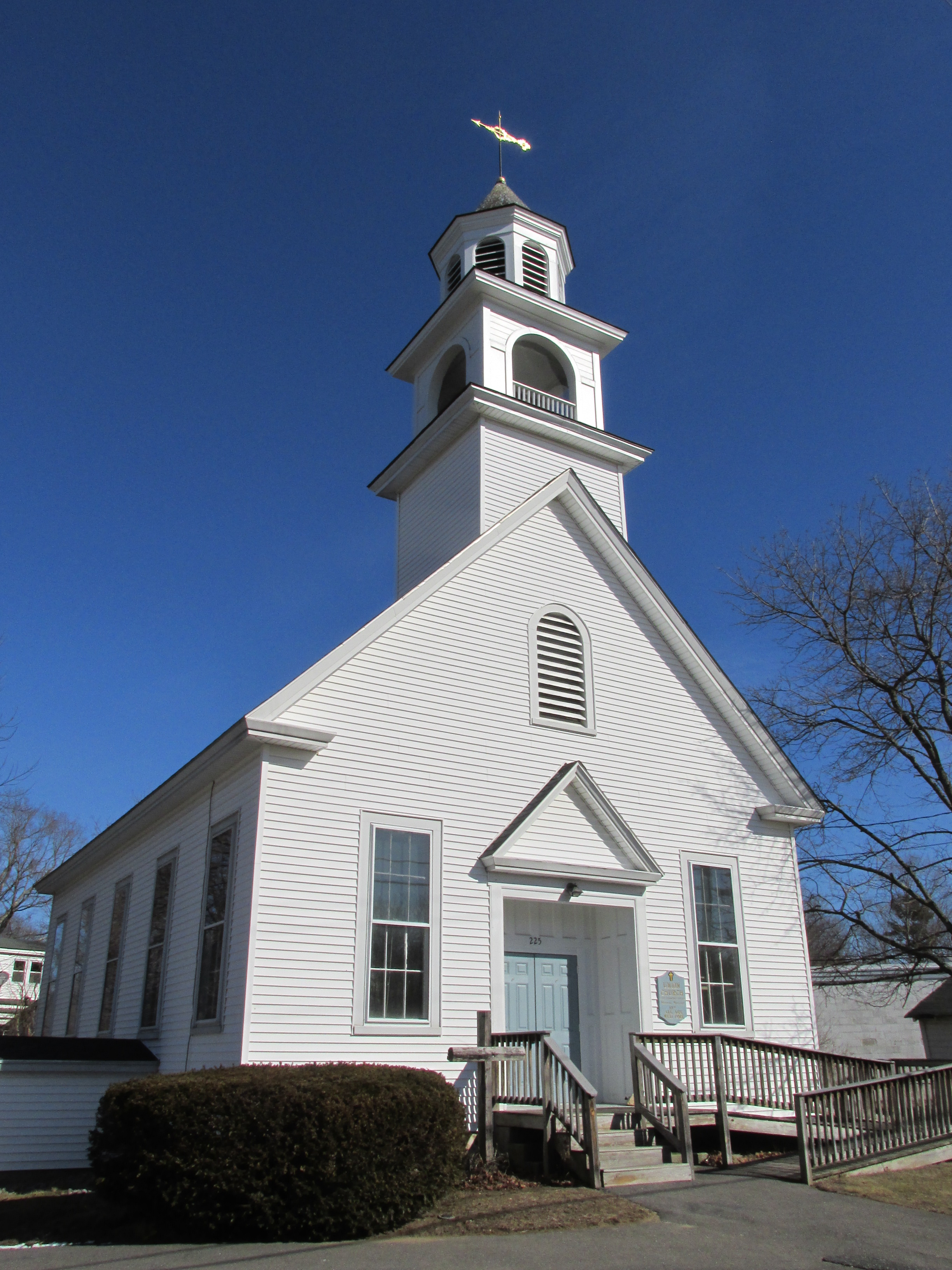
- Union Church

- Location within New Hampshire Location within the United States
- Coordinates: 42°53′28″N 71°08′35″W
- Country: United States
- State: New Hampshire
- County: Rockingham
- Town: Hampstead
- Elevation: 256 ft (78 m)
- Time zone: UTC-5 (Eastern (EST))
  - Summer (DST): UTC-4 (EDT)
- ZIP code: 03826
- Area code: 603
- GNIS feature ID: 866707

East Hampstead is an unincorporated community in the town of Hampstead in Rockingham County, New Hampshire, United States.

It is located near the northeast corner of the town of Hampstead, at the intersection of New Hampshire Route 111 and Route 121A. Route 111 connects Salem to the southwest with Kingston to the northeast, while Route 121A is a local road which connects with Sandown to the northwest and Plaistow to the southeast.

East Hampstead has a separate ZIP code (03826) from the rest of the town of Hampstead.
