= Camp Tel Noar =

Jewish summer camp in New Hampshire, US

Coordinates: 42°53′7″N 71°11′18″W

- Type: Co-Ed Jewish Camp
- Operated by: Cohen Camps
- Established: 1945
- Website: https://www.cohencamps.org/tel-noar

Camp Tel Noar is a Jewish summer camp for children ages 7 through 16. It is located in Hampstead, New Hampshire, in the United States, which is about 1 hour north of Boston. The camp sits on Sunset Lake (Wash Pond) and has about 150 campers.

== History ==
Camp Tel Noar (CTN) was founded by Eli and Bessie Cohen in 1945 as a Zionist camp. For many years, the camp was operated as the Tel Noar Lodge, a Zionist camp for teens and young adults. Camp Tel Noar is currently a Jewish youth camp for children age 7 to 16. Tel Noar operates alongside its sister camps in the Cohen foundation, Tevya and Pembroke.

== Age groups ==
- Olim/Olot - Campers entering grades 4, 5
- Tzofim/Tzofot - Campers entering grades 6, 7, 8
- Bogrim/Bogrot - Campers entering grades 9, 10

== Facilities ==
=== Buildings ===
Buildings include the Dining Hall, Gymnasium, Recreation Hall, Health Center, Arts and Crafts building, Nature building, and Main Office.

==== 1998 fire ====
During March 1998, a fire was caused by the roofing company working on the dining hall in the winter. The fire destroyed the dining hall and kitchen. For the summer of 1998, the camp rented trailers that could be used as a dining hall and kitchen.

=== Areas of camp ===
- The Big Diamond is the softball field directly in front of the dining hall.
- The Dell is near A&C, which is used primarily for soccer.
- The Archery Range is located at the top of the Dell Hill.
- The New Diamond, a multipurpose sports field, is located behind the bunks.
- The Chapel is located at the back end of the Dell and is used only for Friday and Saturday Shabbat services.
- The area around the Flagpole is used for lineup and raising the flags.
- The Ropes Course is located behind the New Diamond and is used for adventure programming.
- The George Marcus Aquatics Center is used for swim instruction and all swim classes.

=== George Marcus Aquatics Center ===
In October, 2010, work began on a state-of-the-art pool and bathhouse. The pool took the place of the Upper Courts, a multi-use basketball and street-hockey court. The Aquatics Center was finished in June 2011, and was ready for the 2011 Camp Season. The facility is dedicated in memory of George Marcus, longtime former director of Camp Tel Noar. The pool was officially dedicated on June 25, 2011, four days before the 2011 Camp Opening Day. For the 2013 Summer season, the final phase of the George Marcus Aquatics Center project was completed. The former volleyball court in the dell was razed and replaced by a modern, multi-use basketball and volleyball court.

== Activities ==
Water sports: Swimming, boating and canoeing, windsurfing, sailing, waterskiing, wakeboarding, and kneeboarding.

Land activities: aerobics, basketball, field hockey, lacrosse, martial arts, fitness and conditioning, soccer, softball, street hockey, Newcomb, ultimate Frisbee, volleyball, tennis, archery, kickball, golf, and badminton.

Arts: arts and crafts, photography, videography, dance, drama, and music.

Nature: nature, camping, animal care, and outdoor cooking.

== Schedule ==
Camp Tel Noar only operates in the summer months of June, July, and August. The campers arrive on the last Wednesday of June and leave seven weeks from there. Staff are required to arrive one week early for orientation. During the year, the facility is closed to the public, but the dining hall is used for the Federation of Jewish Men's Clubs' Laymen's Institute and local events.

Sunday through Friday, a six period schedule is run and on Saturday, a relaxed Shabbat schedule is run.

== Color War ==
During second session, there is a big event where two teams, (Negev and Galil) compete against each other in many competitions over the course of three days.
