= Sandown Old Meetinghouse =

Historic church in New Hampshire, United States

- U.S. National Register of Historic Places
- NH State Register of Historic Places
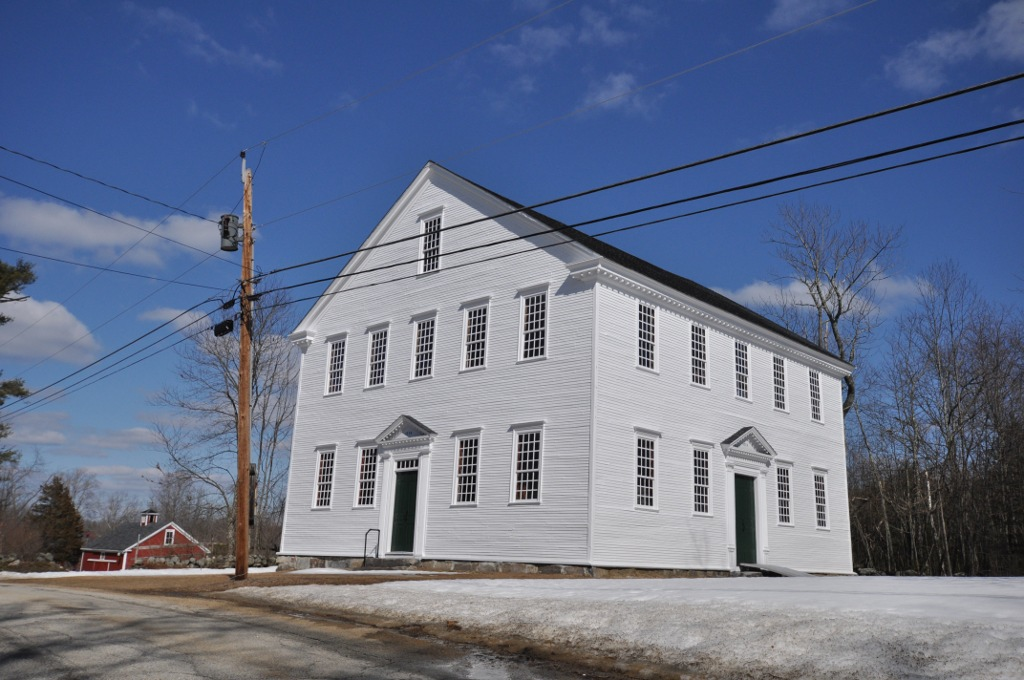

- Location within New Hampshire Location within the United States
- Location: Fremont Rd., Sandown, New Hampshire
- Coordinates: 42°55′58″N 71°11′10″W
- Area: 0.3 acres (0.12 ha)
- Built: 1773
- Architectural style: Georgian
- NRHP reference No.: 78000219

Significant dates
- Added to NRHP: August 09, 1978
- Designated NHSRHP: January 24, 2011

The Sandown Old Meetinghouse is a historic meeting house on Fremont Road in Sandown, New Hampshire. Built in 1773, this two-story timber-frame structure is a virtually unaltered late-Colonial civic and religious structure. It is believed to be unique in the state for its level of preservation, both internal and external. The building, now maintained by a nonprofit organization, was listed on the National Register of Historic Places in 1978, and the New Hampshire State Register of Historic Places in 2011.

== Description and history ==
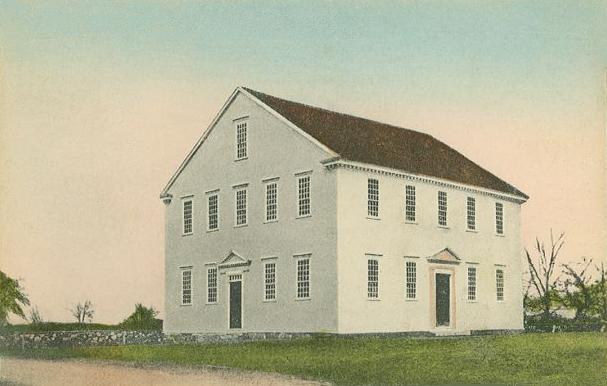
The Old Meetinghouse in 1908

The Sandown Old Meetinghouse is located on a hill above the modern village center of the town, on the east side of Fremont Road. It is a two-story wood-frame structure, with a gabled roof and clapboarded exterior. Its clapboards are original, fastened to the structure by wrought iron nails. The roof eave is modillioned, with returns on the gabled ends. The building is roughly square, with five-bay facades on each side. There are entrances on the east, south, and west sides, all framed by pilasters and topped by fully pedimented gables. The east and west entrances are slightly off-center, and have four-light transom windows. The interior of the building is virtually unaltered, retaining its 18th-century pulpit and sounding board, as well as its original box pews. Alterations include the addition of wood stoves in the 19th century, and the alteration of one area in the gallery to accommodate a choir and organ. The gallery railings originally had spindled balustrades, but most of the spindles have been lost.

The meetinghouse was built in 1773, and is located near the geographic center of the town, opposite the town pound. It served a religious congregation until 1834, and was used for town meetings until 1929. It has been owned by a local nonprofit organization since. It is believed to be unparalleled within the state for its state of preservation.

== See also ==
- National Register of Historic Places listings in Rockingham County, New Hampshire
- New Hampshire Historical Marker No. 26: The Old Meeting House
