= Hampstead Meetinghouse =

Historic church in New Hampshire, United States

- U.S. National Register of Historic Places
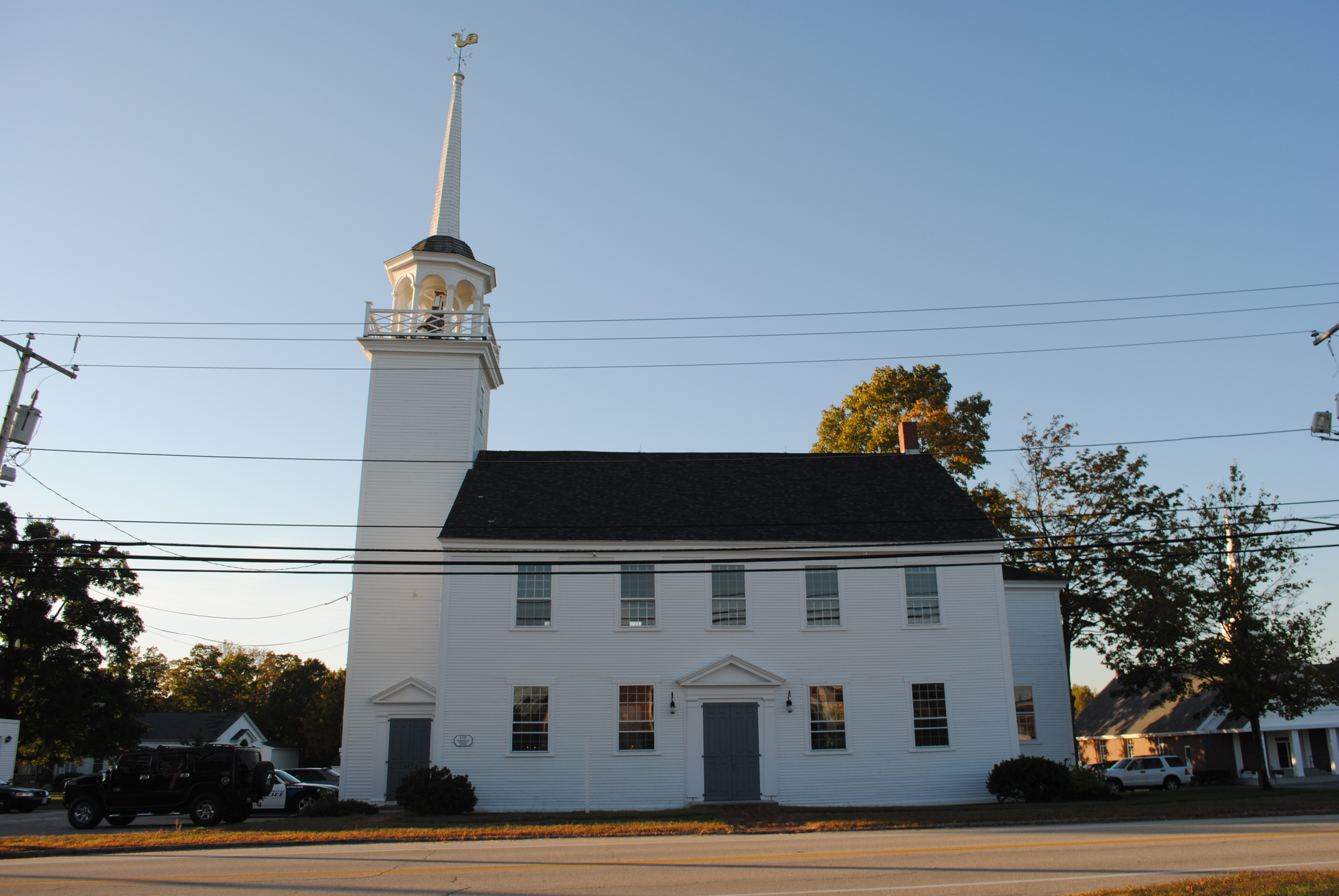

- Location within New Hampshire Location within the United States
- Location: Emerson Ave., Hampstead, New Hampshire
- Coordinates: 42°52′32″N 71°10′48″W
- Area: less than one acre
- Built: 1749
- NRHP reference No.: 80000301
- Added to NRHP: April 10, 1980

The Hampstead Meetinghouse, also once known as Hampstead Town Hall, is a historic meeting house at 20 Emerson Avenue in Hampstead, New Hampshire. The core of this dual-purpose (religious and civic) structure was begun in 1749, although its interior was not completely finished until about 1768. It is one of a number of fairly well-preserved 18th-century meeting houses in southeastern New Hampshire, and was listed on the National Register of Historic Places in 1980.

== Description and history ==
The Hampstead Meetinghouse stands in the village center of Hampstead, on the north side of Emerson Street east of its junction with Main Street (New Hampshire Route 121). It is a two-story wood-frame structure, with a gabled roof and clapboarded exterior. Unlike 19th-century churches, it has its original main entrance on the long side, at the center of a five-bay facade. The entrance is framed by pilasters and a triangular pediment. A bell tower rises just to the left of the main block, with a similarly styled second entrance at its base. It rises square to an open octagonal belfry and spire. The interior, originally a large chamber with a gallery around three sides, has had the upper level fully floored over. Its original configuration would also have had box pews on the main floor, and a raised pulpit with sounding board on the wall opposite the main entrance.

Construction began on the meetinghouse in 1749, but it was not considered finished until 1768, when its interior walls were finally plastered. The tower was added during renovations in 1793, which also included the construction of a porch. The bell which hangs in the tower was added in 1809; it is the product of a short-lived partnership between Paul Revere, Jr. (son of the Revolutionary Paul Revere) and George Holbrook, and may be its only surviving casting. The building ceased to be used for Congregational services in 1837, and in 1856 the gallery level was enclosed, making a full second story, which was set up for theatrical productions.

== See also ==
- National Register of Historic Places listings in Rockingham County, New Hampshire
- New Hampshire Historical Marker No. 247: The Bell of Hampstead Meetinghouse
