= Beede Farm =

Historic house in New Hampshire, United States

- U.S. National Register of Historic Places
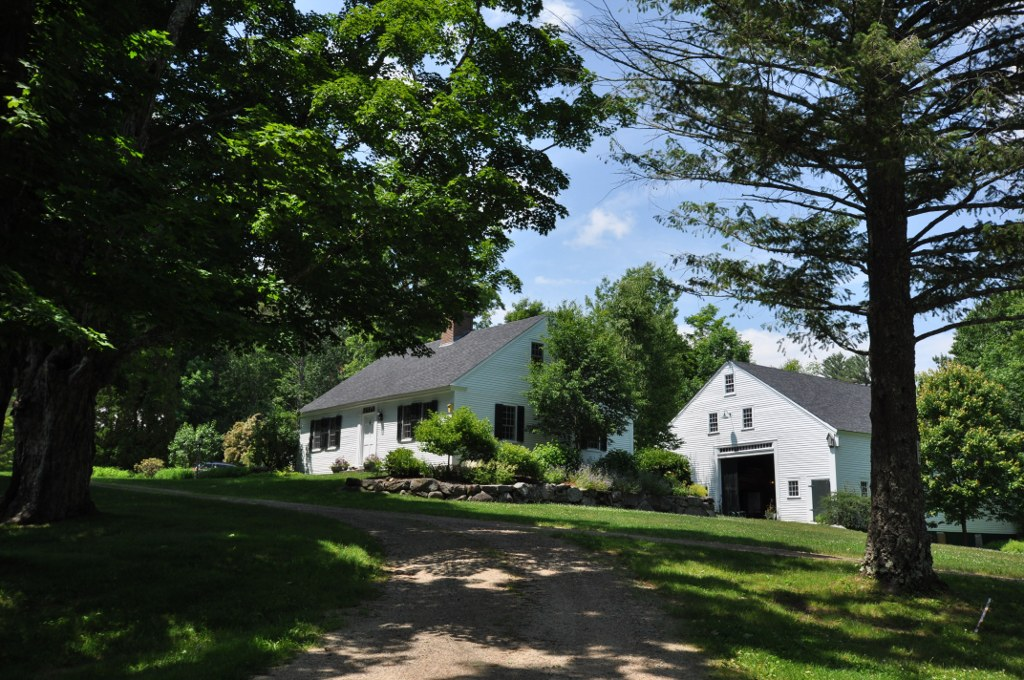

- Location within New Hampshire Location within the United States
- Location: 178 Mill Bridge Road, Sandwich, New Hampshire
- Coordinates: 43°47′38″N 71°28′40″W
- Area: 303 acres (123 ha)
- Built: c. 1830
- NRHP reference No.: 12000502
- Added to NRHP: August 15, 2012

Beede Farm is a historic farm and summer estate at 178 Mill Bridge Road in Sandwich, New Hampshire. The property includes a c. 1830s farmhouse that was erected by John Beede, whose uncle, Daniel Beede, was responsible for platting out much of Sandwich. The 303-acre (123 ha) includes a family cemetery. It was transformed into a summer estate in 1938. The farm was listed on the National Register of Historic Places in 2012.

== Description and history ==
Beede Farm is located in a rural setting in southwestern Sandwich, occupying 303 acres (123 ha) of land on both sides of Mill Bridge Road south of New Hampshire Route 113. About 11 acres (4.5 ha) are open fields, with most of the balance of the property in woodlands. The farmstead is located on the west side of Mill Bridge Road, a short way south of its crossing of Burrows Brook, on 3 acres (1.2 ha) that have been subdivided from the rest of the land. The only buildings of the complex are the house and a barn; other features of the farm include the Beede family cemetery, and a cellar hole where an older house probably stood.

The land was acquired sometime between 1771 and 1782 by Thomas Beede, the brother of Sandwich's first surveyor. Beede's son John took over the property in 1782, and was probably responsible for construction of the house circa 1830, as a replacement for an older house that probably stood atop the extant cellar hole. The Beede family retained ownership of the farm until 1938, operating what was a fairly typical farm for the Lakes Region. The farm reached a maximum land size of over 400 acres (160 ha), extending all the way to Squam Lake. In the early 20th century, a portion of the farm was loaned to Camp Hale, a summer camp for boys, which the farm supplied with dairy products and other farm goods.

The Parsons family, who purchased the land in 1938, renovated the house in a then-fashionable "restoration" of its interior to what was then thought to be a period appearance. The land surrounding it is now under a perpetual conservation easement.

== See also ==
- National Register of Historic Places listings in Carroll County, New Hampshire
