= Hampstead, New Hampshire =

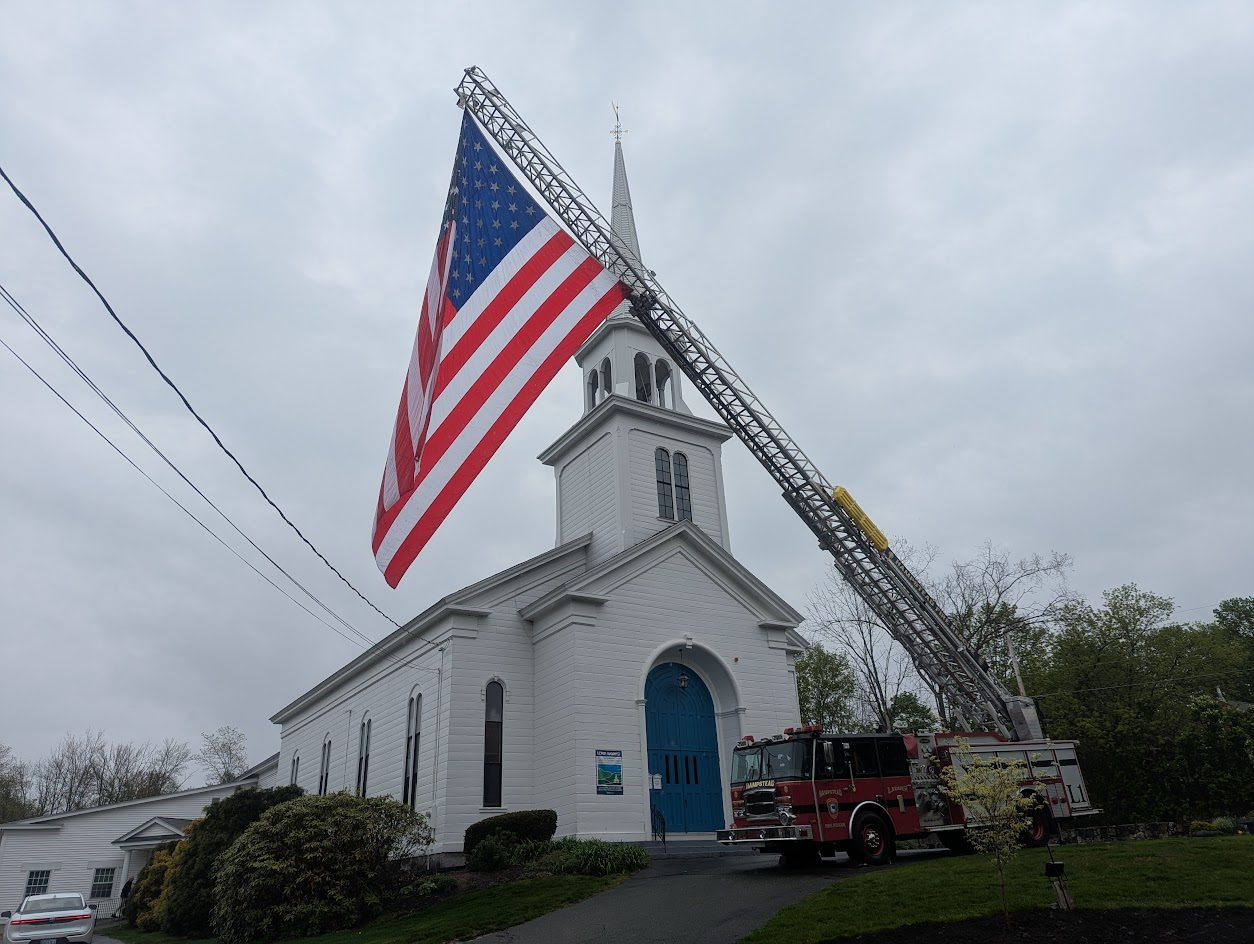
- A Hampstead fire engine parked at the Hampstead Congregational Church in 2026

- Seal

- Location in Rockingham County and the state of New Hampshire.
- Coordinates: 42°52′28″N 71°10′52″W
- Country: United States
- State: New Hampshire
- County: Rockingham
- Incorporated: 1749
- Villages: Hampstead; East Hampstead; West Hampstead

Area
  - Total: 14.1 sq mi (36.5 km^{2})
  - Land: 13.4 sq mi (34.8 km^{2})
  - Water: 0.66 sq mi (1.7 km^{2}) 4.72%
- Elevation: 315 ft (96 m)

Population (2020)
  - Total: 8,998
  - Density: 671/sq mi (258.9/km^{2})
- Time zone: UTC-5 (Eastern)
  - Summer (DST): UTC-4 (Eastern)
- ZIP codes: 03841 (Hampstead); 03826 (East Hampstead); 03038 (Derry)
- Area code: 603
- FIPS code: 33-32900
- GNIS feature ID: 873615
- Website: www.hampsteadnh.us

Hampstead is a town in Rockingham County, New Hampshire, United States. The population was 8,998 at the 2020 census. Hampstead, which includes the village of East Hampstead, is home to a portion of the Rockingham Recreational Trail.

== History ==
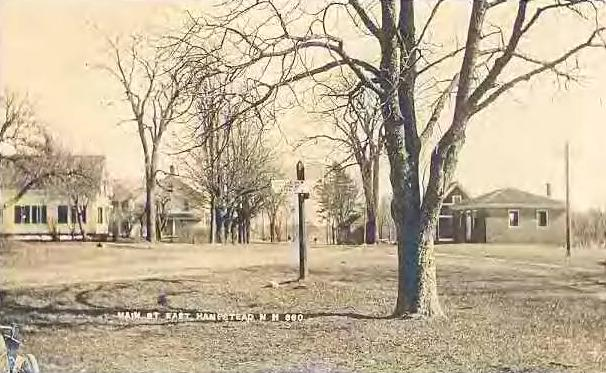
Main Street in 1914, East Hampstead

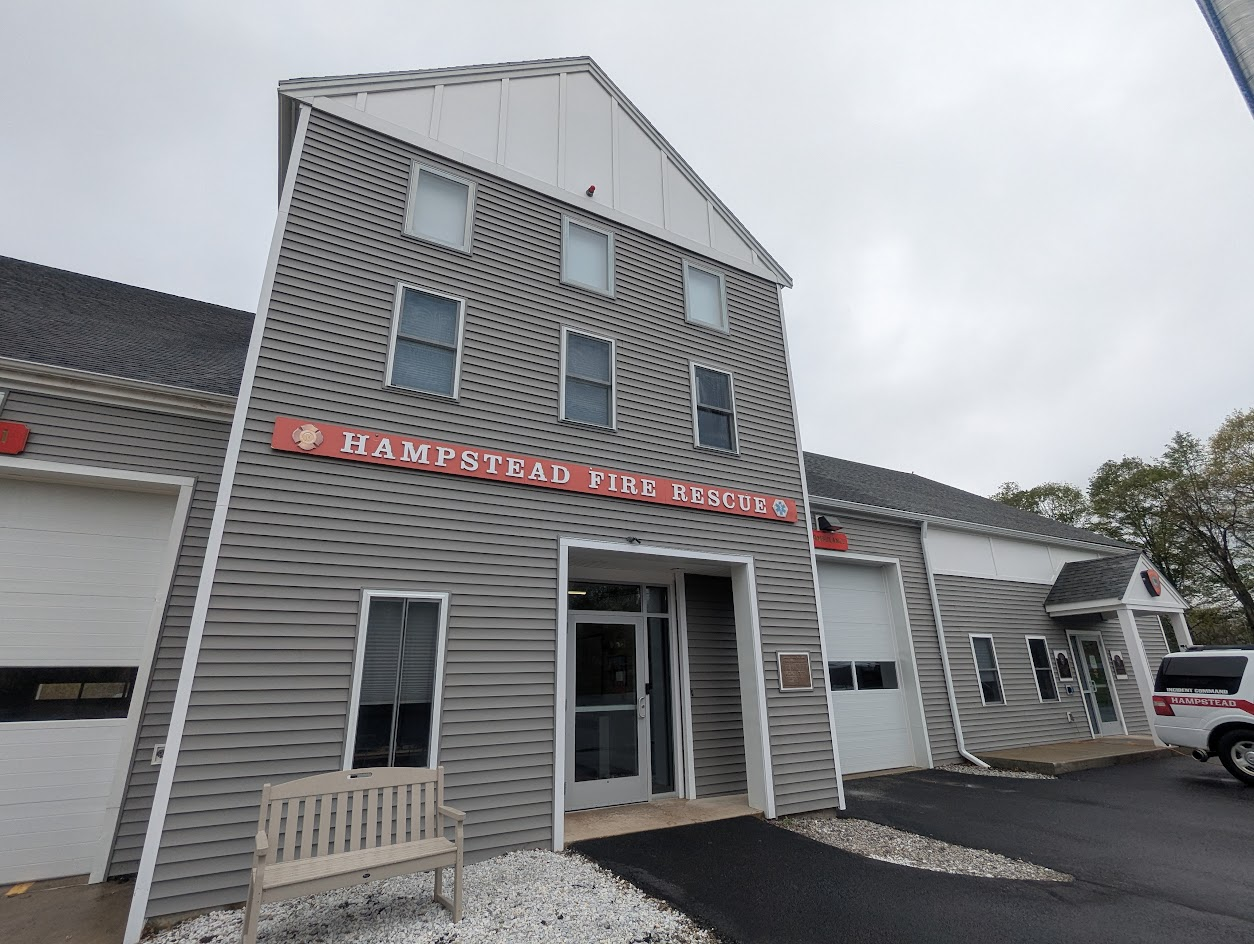
The town's fire station in 2026

Once part of Haverhill and Amesbury, Massachusetts, and settled in 1640, this town was formed as a result of the 1739 decision fixing the boundary line between Massachusetts and New Hampshire. It was originally known as "Timberlane Parish" because of the heavy growth of native trees. The town was incorporated in 1749 by colonial governor Benning Wentworth, who renamed it after Hampstead, England, the residence of William Pitt, a close friend.

The Hampstead Meetinghouse, constructed circa 1749–1768, was added to the National Register of Historic Places in 1980.

Hampstead was the home of the first honey factory in the United States, in 1816.

== Geography ==
According to the United States Census Bureau, the town has a total area of 14.1 square miles (36.5 km^{2}), of which 13.4 square miles (34.8 km^{2}) are land and 0.66 square miles (1.7 km^{2}) are water, comprising 4.72% of the town. Island Pond is in the southwest, with Wash Pond near the center and Angle Pond on the northern border. The highest point in Hampstead is greater than 460 feet (140 m) above sea level at the town's northwestern corner, near the eastern knob of Butman Hill. Hampstead lies mostly within the Merrimack River watershed, though the area east of Butman Hill and north of Smith Mountain is part the Piscataqua River (Coastal) watershed. Hampstead is home to Camp Tel Noar, an overnight summer camp on Wash Pond (Sunset Lake).

=== Adjacent municipalities ===
- Sandown (north)
- Danville (northeast)
- Kingston (east)
- Plaistow (southeast)
- Atkinson (south)
- Derry (west)

== Demographics ==
Historical population
Census	Pop.	Note	%±
1790	724		—
1800	790		9.1%
1810	738		−6.6%
1820	751		1.8%
1830	913		21.6%
1840	890		−2.5%
1850	789		−11.3%
1860	930		17.9%
1870	935		0.5%
1880	950		1.6%
1890	860		−9.5%
1900	823		−4.3%
1910	796		−3.3%
1920	670		−15.8%
1930	775		15.7%
1940	823		6.2%
1950	902		9.6%
1960	1,261		39.8%
1970	2,401		90.4%
1980	3,785		57.6%
1990	6,732		77.9%
2000	8,297		23.2%
2010	8,523		2.7%
2020	8,998		5.6%
U.S. Decennial Census

At the 2000 census there were 8,297 people, 3,044 households, and 2,279 families living in the town. The population density was 623.0 inhabitants per square mile (240.5/km^{2}). There were 3,276 housing units at an average density of 246.0 per square mile (95.0/km^{2}). The racial makeup of the town was 98.47% White, 0.23% African American, 0.08% Native American, 0.54% Asian, 0.05% Pacific Islander, 0.16% from other races, and 0.47% from two or more races. Hispanic or Latino of any race were 0.78%.

Of the 3,044 households 41.1% had children under the age of 18 living with them, 66.2% were married couples living together, 6.0% had a female householder with no husband present, and 25.1% were non-families. 20.7% of households were one person and 6.1% were one person aged 65 or older. The average household size was 2.72 and the average family size was 3.19.

The age distribution was 28.9% under the age of 18, 5.1% from 18 to 24, 31.0% from 25 to 44, 25.6% from 45 to 64, and 9.3% 65 or older. The median age was 38 years. For every 100 females, there were 98.4 males. For every 100 females age 18 and over, there were 95.7 males.

The median household income was $68,533 and the median family income was $79,114. Males had a median income of $56,625 versus $31,449 for females. The per capita income for the town was $29,195. About 2.4% of families and 3.8% of the population were below the poverty line, including 6.3% of those under age 18 and 3.7% of those age 65 or over.

== Transportation ==
Three New Hampshire state routes cross Hampstead:

- NH 111 crosses the town from the southwest to the northeast corner. It connects to Atkinson in the southwest and Danville in the northeast.
- NH 121 crosses the western part of town from north to south; it is known locally as Main Street and Stage Road. It connects to Chester in the north via the southwest corner of Sandown and to Atkinson in the south.
- NH 121A crosses the northeastern corner of town through the village of East Hampstead, connecting Danville in the north and Plaistow in the south. It is known locally as Sandown Road and East Main Street.

The nearest airport is Manchester–Boston Regional Airport along the border of Londonderry and Manchester.

== Education ==
Local public schools include:

- Hampstead Central School
- Hampstead Middle School

The Town of Hampstead pays tuition for town students to attend Pinkerton Academy in Derry, and therefore Pinkerton serves as Hampstead's public high school.

Hampstead Academy is a private school in Hampstead.

== Notable people ==
- Lauren Chooljian (born 1987), radio journalist
- Andy Seuss (born 1987), professional NASCAR driver
