= Sandown, New Hampshire =

- Town
- Seal

- Location in Rockingham County and the state of New Hampshire.
- Coordinates: 42°56′00″N 71°11′00″W
- Country: United States
- State: New Hampshire
- County: Rockingham
- Incorporated: 1756

Area
  - Total: 14.4 sq mi (37.4 km^{2})
  - Land: 13.9 sq mi (36.1 km^{2})
  - Water: 0.50 sq mi (1.3 km^{2}) 3.39%
- Elevation: 240 ft (73 m)

Population (2020)
  - Total: 6,548
  - Density: 470/sq mi (181.4/km^{2})
- Time zone: UTC-5 (Eastern)
  - Summer (DST): UTC-4 (Eastern)
- ZIP code: 03873
- Area code: 603
- FIPS code: 33-67620
- GNIS feature ID: 873716
- Website: sandown.us

Sandown is a town in Rockingham County, New Hampshire, United States. The population was 6,548 at the 2020 census, up from 5,986 at the 2010 census.

== History ==
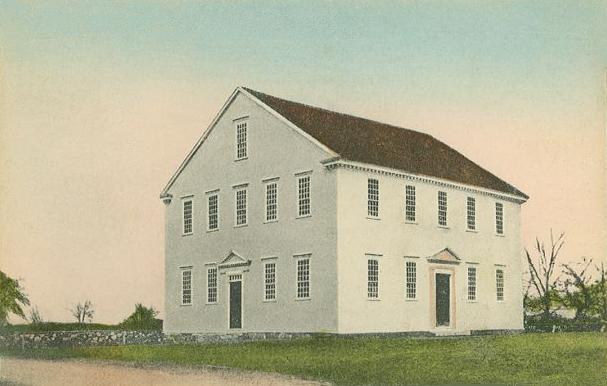
The Old Meeting House in 1908

Once part of Kingston, Sandown was incorporated as a separate town in 1756 by colonial governor Benning Wentworth. It was named after the picturesque Sandown on the Isle of Wight. The first minister of Sandown, the Reverend Josiah Cotton, built the Sandown Meeting House in 1774. It had an 11-foot-high (3.4 m) pulpit, marble columns supporting the gallery, and is still an excellent example of early New England church architecture.

== Geography ==
According to the United States Census Bureau, the town has a total area of 14.4 square miles (37.4 km^{2}), of which 13.9 square miles (36.1 km^{2}) are land and 0.50 square miles (1.3 km^{2}) are water, comprising 3.39% of the town. Sandown is primarily drained by the Exeter River, part of the Great Bay/Piscataqua River watershed. Phillips Pond, south of the center of town, and Showell Pond, a smaller water body, drain north to the Exeter River. Angle Pond, in the southeastern corner of the town, and Cub Pond, along Sandown's eastern border, drain east towards the Powwow River and are part of the Merrimack River watershed. The highest point in Sandown is the summit of Hoyt Hill, at 505 feet (154 m) above sea level, near the town's southwestern corner.

=== Adjacent municipalities ===
- Fremont (northeast)
- Danville (east)
- Hampstead (south)
- Derry (southwest)
- Chester (northwest)

== Demographics ==
Historical population
Census	Pop.	Note	%±
1790	561		—
1800	501		−10.7%
1810	504		0.6%
1820	527		4.6%
1830	553		4.9%
1840	525		−5.1%
1850	566		7.8%
1860	553		−2.3%
1870	496		−10.3%
1880	500		0.8%
1890	475		−5.0%
1900	400		−15.8%
1910	380		−5.0%
1920	280		−26.3%
1930	229		−18.2%
1940	292		27.5%
1950	315		7.9%
1960	366		16.2%
1970	741		102.5%
1980	2,057		177.6%
1990	4,060		97.4%
2000	5,143		26.7%
2010	5,986		16.4%
2020	6,548		9.4%
U.S. Decennial Census

As of the census of 2000, there were 5,143 people, 1,694 households and 1,382 families residing in the town. The population density was 369.8 inhabitants per square mile (142.8/km^{2}). There were 1,777 housing units at an average density of 127.8 per square mile (49.3/km^{2}). The racial makeup of the town was 98.43% White, 0.21% African American, 0.12% Native American, 0.16% Asian, 0.02% Pacific Islander, 0.37% from other races, and 0.70% from two or more races. Hispanic or Latino of any race were 0.56% of the population.

There were 1,694 households, out of which 48.7% had children under the age of 18 living with them, 71.0% were married couples living together, 6.8% had a female householder with no husband present, and 18.4% were non-families. 12.9% of all households were made up of individuals, and 3.1% had someone living alone who was 65 years of age or older. The average household size was 3.02 and the average family size was 3.32.

In the town, the population was spread out, with 31.4% under the age of 18, 5.4% from 18 to 24, 37.1% from 25 to 44, 20.7% from 45 to 64, and 5.3% who were 65 years of age or older. The median age was 35 years. For every 100 females, there were 105.1 males. For every 100 females age 18 and over, there were 100.5 males.

The median income for a household in the town was $67,581, and the median income for a family was $73,083. Males had a median income of $49,012 versus $29,773 for females. The per capita income for the town was $25,978. About 3.3% of families and 4.1% of the population were below the poverty line, including 2.8% of those under age 18 and 9.2% of those age 65 or over.

== Education ==
- Timberlane Regional High School, Grades 9–12, located in Plaistow
- Timberlane Regional Middle School, Grades 6–8, located in Plaistow
- Sandown North Elementary School, Grades 1–5, located in Sandown
- Sandown Central School, Grades Pre-K, located in Sandown

== Transportation ==
Two New Hampshire state routes cross Sandown.

- NH 121 crosses the extreme southwestern corner of town, running from Chester (via a small corner of Derry) to Hampstead.
- NH 121A is the main road through the center of town, running from Chester in the west to the village of East Hampstead in the southeast. It is locally known as Main Street.
