= Cassandra Levesque =

American state legislator

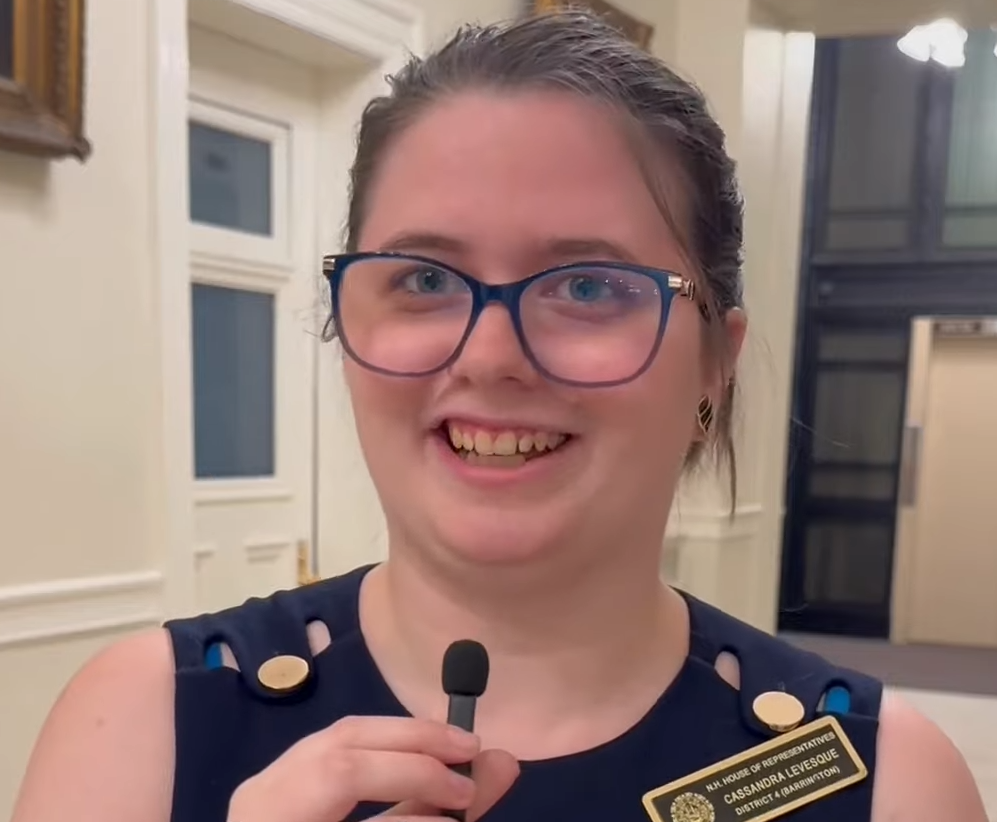
- Levesque in 2024

Member of the New Hampshire House of Representatives from the Strafford 4th district
- Incumbent
- Assumed office December 5, 2018 Serving with Len Turcotte and Heath Howard
- Preceded by: Jackie Cilley; Len Turcotte

Personal details
- Born: May 3 , 1999
- Party: Democratic
- Education: Southern New Hampshire University

Cassandra Levesque (born May 3, 1999) is an American politician in the state of New Hampshire. She has been a Democratic member of the New Hampshire House of Representatives since 2018, representing the Strafford 4 district. Levesque has contributed to efforts to eliminate child marriage in New Hampshire.

== Early life ==
Levesque became a Girl Scout when she was five years old. She began researching child marriage as a project for the program's Gold Award. Levesque worked with her state Representative, Jackie Cilley, to draft a bill that would eliminate provisions allowing minors to marry with judicial and parental consent. The state House of Representatives voted against the bill's passage. Despite the bill's failure, other legislation sponsored by Cilley passed which raised the minimum age for marriage from 13 to 16. Levesque said she would continue to advocate for the minimum marriage age to be raised to 18.

== Electoral politics ==
When both incumbents from the Strafford 4 district, Cilley and Len Turcotte, decided to retire, local Democrats convinced Levesque to run in the 2018 election. Levesque was elected on a campaign of representing small businesses and addressing water-quality issues. At 19, she became the youngest serving member of New Hampshire's legislature. Levesque has continued to press the issue of child marriage in the legislature.

Levesque is one of the few members of Generation Z serving within the New Hampshire House of Representatives, alongside Valerie McDonnell, a Republican. Both Levesque and McDonnell spoke at Dartmouth College in 2026.

== Electoral history ==
=== 2018 ===
New Hampshire's Strafford 4 House district Democratic primary results, 2018
Party	Candidate	Votes	%
Democratic	Cassandra Levesque	699	51.3
Democratic	Matthew Towne	663	48.7
Total votes		1,362	100.0

New Hampshire's Strafford 4 House district general election results, 2018
Party	Candidate	Votes	%
Democratic	Cassandra Levesque	2,061	26.4
Democratic	Matthew Towne	1,983	25.4
Republican	Jenny Wilson	1,801	23.0
Republican	Robert Drew	1,787	22.9
Libertarian	Frank Bertone	187	2.4
Total votes		7,819	100.0

=== 2020 ===
New Hampshire's Strafford 4 House district Democratic primary results, 2020
Party	Candidate	Votes	%
Democratic	Cassandra Levesque (incumbent)	870	51.2
Democratic	Matthew Towne (incumbent)	827	48.6
N/A	Write-ins	3	0.2
Total votes		1,362	100.0

New Hampshire's Strafford 4 House district general election results, 2020
Party	Candidate	Votes	%
Republican	Len Turcotte	2,844	26.3
Democratic	Cassandra Levesque (incumbent)	2,755	25.5
Democratic	Matthew Towne (incumbent)	2,611	24.1
Republican	Jenny Wilson	2,604	24.1
N/A	Write-ins	5	0.0
Total votes		10,819	100.0

=== 2022 ===
New Hampshire's Strafford 4 House district Democratic primary results, 2022
Party	Candidate	Votes	%
Democratic	Cassandra Levesque	798	34.4
Democratic	Matthew Towne	776	33.4
Democratic	Heath Howard	749	32.2
Total votes		2,323	100.0

New Hampshire's Strafford 4 House district general election results, 2022
Party	Candidate	Votes	%
Democratic	Cassandra Levesque (incumbent)	3,363	17.4
Republican	Len Turcotte (incumbent)	3,283	17.0
Democratic	Heath Howard	3,243	16.8
Democratic	Matthew Towne	3,236	16.8
Republican	Kurt Wuelper (incumbent) (Note: Redistricted from the Strafford 3 district.)	3,127	16.2
Republican	Davis Miller	3,052	15.8
Total votes		19,304	100.0

== See also ==
- List of the youngest state legislators in the United States
