= Bow Lake =

Bow Lake may refer to:

In the United States:

- Bow Lake (New Hampshire)
  - Bow Lake Village, New Hampshire, at the outlet of Bow Lake
- Bow Lake (SeaTac, Washington)

In Canada:

- Bow Lake (Alberta) in Banff National Park
- Bow Lake (Ontario) a lake in Hastings County
