= Berrys River =

- Location within New Hampshire Location within the United States

Location
- Country: United States
- State: New Hampshire
- County: Strafford
- Towns: Farmington, Strafford, Barrington

Physical characteristics
- Source
  - location: Farmington
  - coordinates: 43°21′43″N 71°8′39″W
  - elevation: 910 ft (280 m)
- Mouth: Isinglass River
  - location: Barrington
  - coordinates: 43°14′33″N 71°4′54″W
  - elevation: 235 ft (72 m)
- Length: 12.9 mi (20.8 km)

The Berrys River is a 12.9-mile-long (20.8 km) river located in southeastern New Hampshire in the United States. It is a tributary of the Isinglass River, part of the Cocheco River/Piscataqua River watershed leading to the Atlantic Ocean.

The river rises in Farmington, New Hampshire, and flows southeast past Blue Job Mountain. Turning south, the river passes through the eastern corner of Strafford and enters Barrington, where it is interrupted by Long Pond. One mile below the pond, the Berrys River reaches the Isinglass.

== See also ==
- List of rivers of New Hampshire
