= Len Turcotte =

American politician

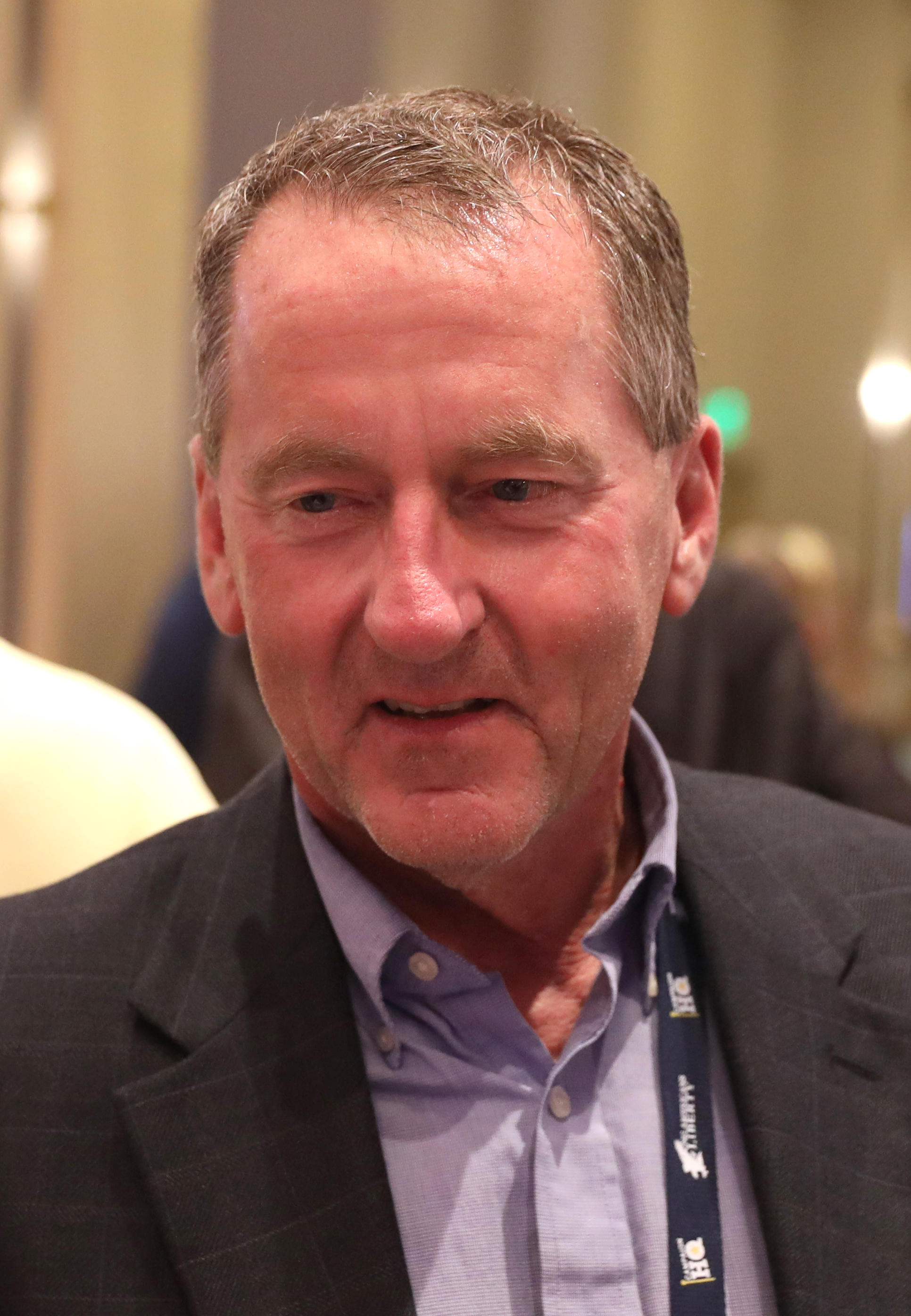

Member of the New Hampshire House of Representatives from the Strafford 4th district
- Incumbent
- Assumed office December 2, 2020
- Preceded by: Matthew D. Towne
- In office December 3, 2014 – December 5, 2018
- Preceded by: Dennis Malloy; Ken Grossman
- Succeeded by: Cassandra Levesque; Matthew D. Towne

Personal details
- Born: 1961 (age 64–65) Manchester, New Hampshire
- Party: Republican
- Spouse: Deborah
- Children: 2
- Education: New Hampshire Technical Institute (AAS); University of New Hampshire (attended)
- Website: Campaign website

Leonard "Len" Turcotte (born 1961) is an American politician. He serves as a Republican member for the Strafford 4th district of the New Hampshire House of Representatives. Turcotte currently serves as chairman of the Municipal and County Government Committee.

== Personal life ==
Turcotte graduated from Portsmouth High School. Turcotte earned an associate degree in architectural engineering from New Hampshire Technical Institute. Turcotte resides in Barrington, New Hampshire. Turcotte is married and has two children.

== Political career ==
Turcotte was first elected to the New Hampshire House of Representatives in 2014. Turcotte currently serves as chairman of the Municipal and County Government Committee.
