= Isinglass (disambiguation) =

Isinglass is a material prepared from the air bladders of fish and used for various functions including beer making as a flocculator, to make gelatinous substances, an egg preservative and for parchment conservation.

Isinglass may also refer to:

- Mica, a phyllosilicate mineral of aluminium and potassium. Sheet mica is sometimes used to make small windows
- Isinglass (horse), a British Thoroughbred racehorse
- Isinglass River, in New Hampshire, United States
- Project Isinglass, a United States Central Intelligence Agency aircraft study
