= Heath Howard =

American politician (born 2000)

Member-elect of the Strafford County Commission from the 3rd district
- Assuming office January 2027
- Succeeding: Sean Leavitt

Member of the New Hampshire House of Representatives from the 4th Strafford district
- Incumbent
- Assumed office December 7, 2022
- Preceded by: Seat established

Personal details
- Born: May 26, 2000 (age 26) Strafford, New Hampshire, U.S.
- Party: Democratic
- Education: University of New Hampshire (BA)
- Website: Campaign website

Heath J. Howard (born May 26, 2000) is an American politician. He currently serves as a member of the New Hampshire House of Representatives representing Strafford County District 4, encompassing Strafford and Barrington, for the Democratic Party. He assumed office on December 7, 2022. Howard is currently the Deputy Ranking member of the Executive Departments and Administration.

Howard launched his campaign for New Hampshire's 1st Congressional District in July 2025. His platform focused on issues like universal health care, a living wage, tuition-free college, and affordable housing. On August 24, 2026, he suspended his campaign for congress. He endorsed Carleigh Beriont in the primary.

== Early life and education ==
Howard was born May 26, 2000, in Strafford, New Hampshire to Daniel and Elizabeth Howard. He has one older sister. His father is a builder and building inspector for the town of Strafford and his mother is an occupational therapist. He graduated from Spaulding High School in 2018. He completed a Bachelor of Arts in History at the University of New Hampshire in 2022.

== Politics ==
He won the general elections on November 8, 2022, and assumed office in the New Hampshire House of Representatives on December 7, 2022. While his district was carried by Republican Governor Kelly Ayotte, Heath Howard secured his re-election on November 5, 2024, with a narrow 16-vote margin. He served as a member of the Election Law and Executive Departments and Administration Committee.
