= Former Berwick High School =

- Berwick High School
- U.S. National Register of Historic Places
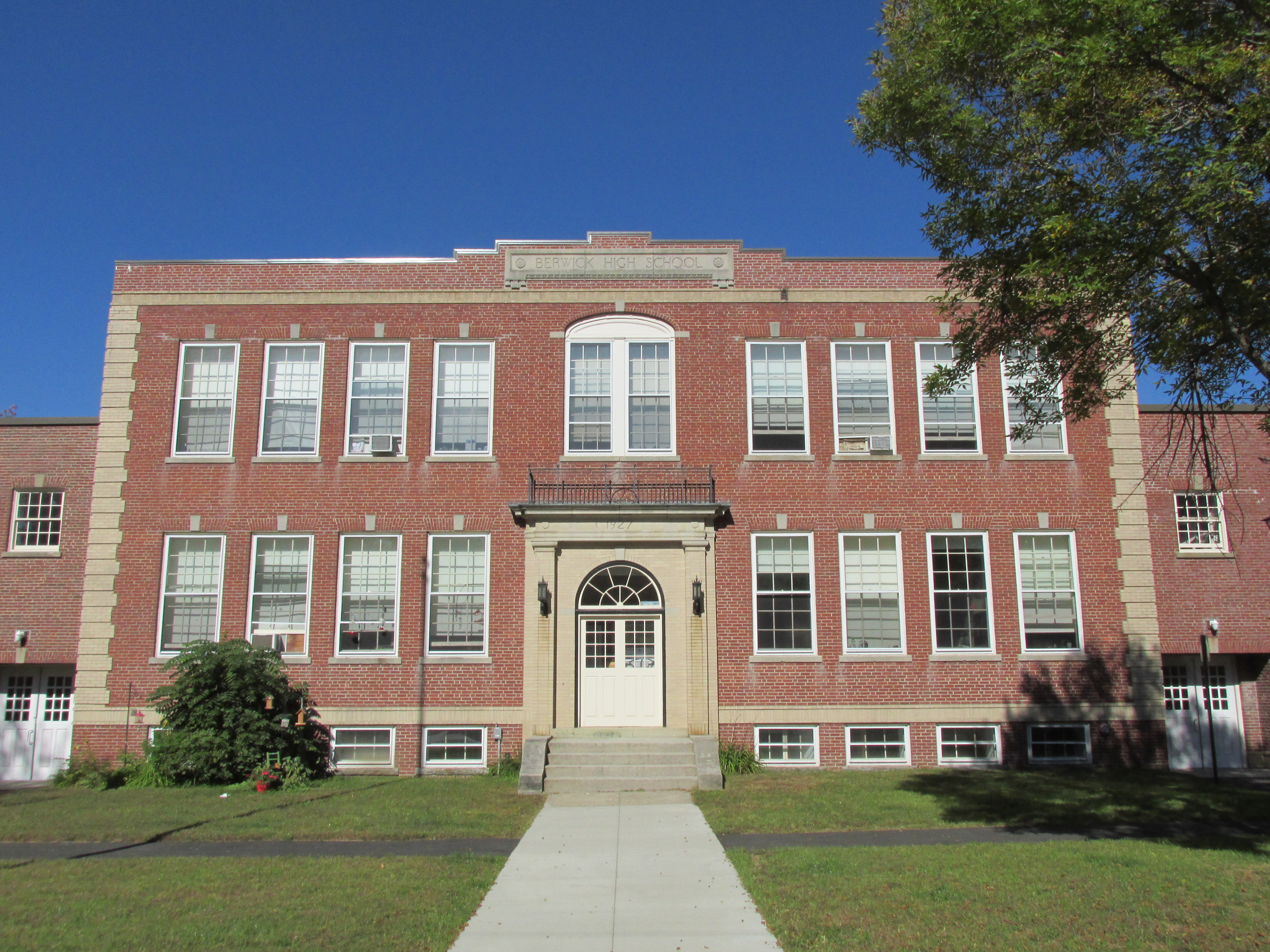

- Location within Maine Location within the United States
- Location: 45 School St., Berwick, Maine
- Area: 1 acre (0.40 ha)
- Built: 1927
- Built by: Philip P. Snow
- Architect: J. Edward Richardson
- Architectural style: Colonial Revival
- NRHP reference No.: 11001059
- Added to NRHP: January 27, 2012

The Former Berwick High School is a large brick Colonial Revival building at 45 School Street in Berwick, Maine, United States. It was built in 1927 and expanded in 1953 and 1960. It replaced the town's second high school (built in 1894). It was listed on the National Register of Historic Places in 2012.

== Description and history ==
The former Berwick High School building is set on the west side of School Street (Maine State Route 9), on a large parcel of land that includes several other town-owned buildings on the northeastern edge of Berwick's downtown area. It is a large two-story structure with Colonial Revival styling, its exterior finished in brick except for the gymnasium and maintenance ells at the rear. The building has at its center the main block, which was built in 1927, and is flanked by two large classroom wings, added in 1953 and 1960. The front (east-facing) facades of the wings are sparsely decorated, with few windows, serving to highlight the original building's Colonial Revival features. These include tan-colored corner quoining, cast stone sills for the windows (except at the basement level, where cut granite was used), and similar stone keystones above the windows. Tan beltcourses run above and below the main floors, and the main entrance is a double door topped by a half-round transom, with flanking tan brick pilasters and a cast stone entablature above.

Berwick's first secondary school was the private Berwick Academy, established in South Berwick in 1798. The town's first public high school was built in 1872, and originally also housed some primary school students. This wood frame building burned down in 1894, and was replaced the same year. It was destroyed in June 1927 by a fire started in its boiler while classes were in session. The present building was constructed in 1927-28, with classes held in the interim at the local Knights of Pythias hall. It originally housed grades 7-12, the students of the lower two grades occupying the ground floor. These grades were moved out in 1948. Increasing enrollment prompted the construction of the two wings in the 1957 and 1960. The building was used as a school until 2001, when the regional Noble High School opened, serving not just Berwick, but also Lebanon and North Berwick. The building was vacant at the time it was listed on the National Register of Historic Places in 2012, and the town was considering redevelopment alternatives.

== See also ==
- National Register of Historic Places listings in York County, Maine
