= Strafford Union Academy =

- U.S. National Register of Historic Places
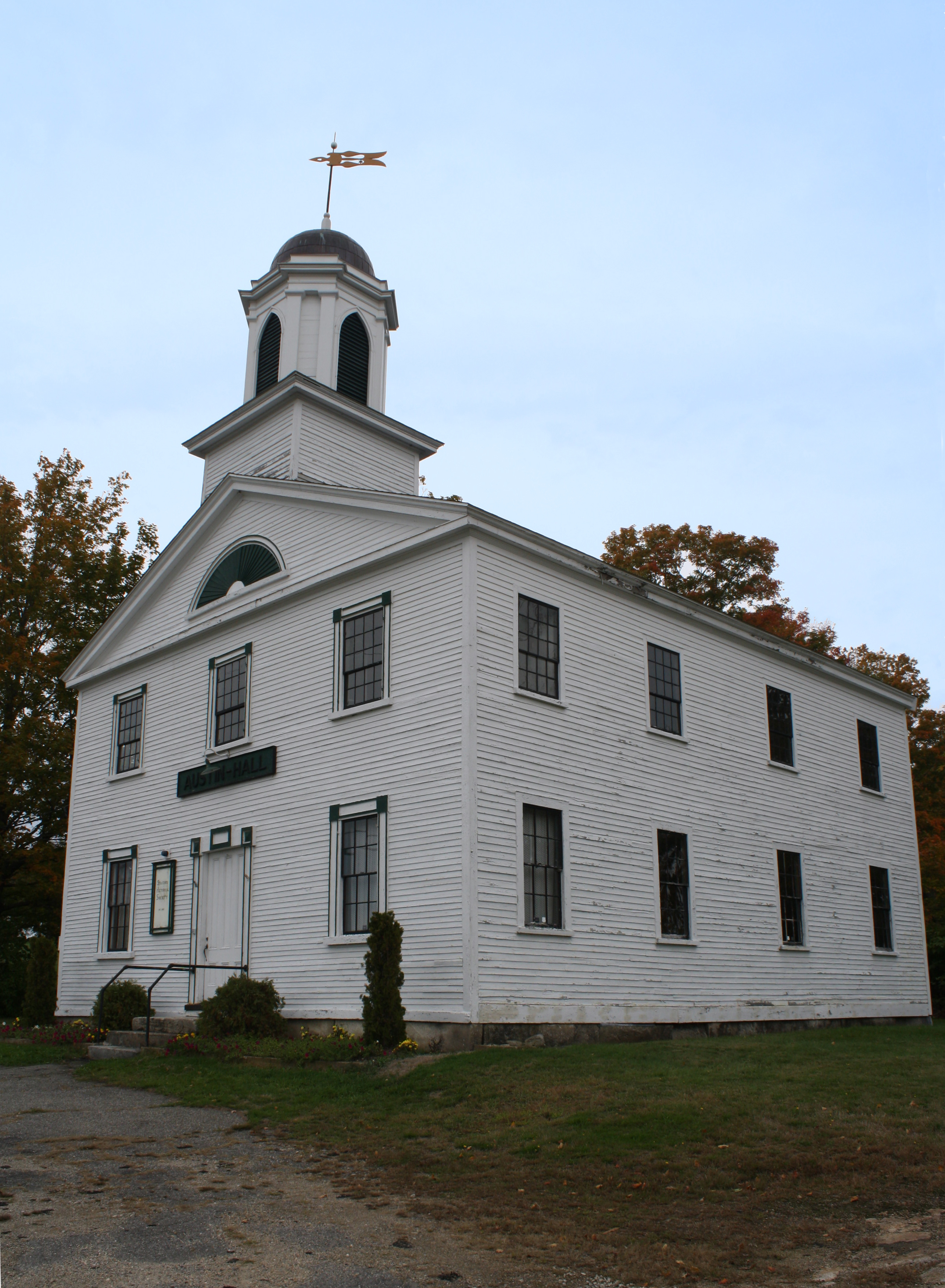

- Location within New Hampshire Location within the United States
- Location: NH 202A and 126, Strafford, New Hampshire
- Coordinates: 43°16′7″N 71°7′23″W
- Area: less than one acre
- Built: 1833
- Architectural style: Greek Revival, Federal
- NRHP reference No.: 83001155
- Added to NRHP: September 22, 1983

The Strafford Union Academy, also known as Austin Hall, is a historic school building at the junction of New Hampshire Routes 202A and 126 in Center Strafford, New Hampshire. Built in 1833, it is one of the best-preserved early 19th-century academy buildings in the state. The building, now maintained by the local historical society, was listed on the National Register of Historic Places in 1983.

== Description and history ==
The Strafford Union Academy building is located on the east side of the village of Center Strafford, on the north side of the junction New Hampshire Routes 202A and 126. It is a two-story wood-frame structure, with a front-facing gable roof and clapboarded exterior. A short tower rises from the front of the roof, with a square first section and octagonal belfry capped by a domed cupola. The front facade is three bays wide and symmetrically organized, with a center entrance. Trim on this facade is a vernacular version of Greek Revival styling, with flat moulding and corner blocks. The gable above is fully pedimented, with a half-round louvered fan at the center. The interior consists of large classroom chambers on each floor, with an entry vestibule that has a staircase on one side. Original plaster walls have in part been covered by modern materials, and the vestibule area has been finished in pine.

The academy was established in 1833, as a combination of a private secondary school and as a seminary for the Free Will Baptist denomination, which was founded in nearby New Durham. It served both of these roles during the 19th century, with its affiliation with the Free Will Baptists ending in 1881. It continued as a private secondary school until 1902, when Strafford Academy moved to new quarters. The building later housed the Austin Cate Academy, and now houses the Strafford Historical Society museum.

== See also ==
- National Register of Historic Places listings in Strafford County, New Hampshire
- New Hampshire Historical Marker No. 291: Strafford Union Academy 1833–1903 / Austin-Cate Academy 1904–1981
