= Isinglass River =

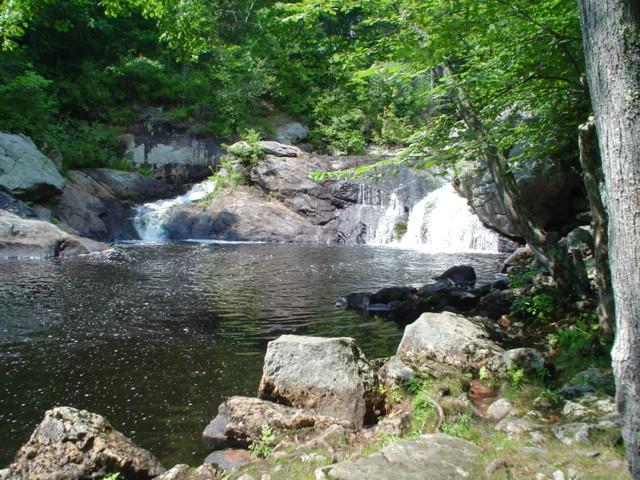
- Locke's Falls

- Location within New Hampshire Location within the United States

Location
- Country: United States
- State: New Hampshire
- County: Strafford
- Towns and city: Strafford, Barrington, Rochester

Physical characteristics
- Source: Bow Lake
  - location: Bow Lake Village
  - coordinates: 43°14′30″N 71°9′9″W
  - elevation: 515 ft (157 m)
- Mouth: Cochecho River
  - location: Rochester
  - coordinates: 43°13′58″N 70°56′58″W
  - elevation: 110 ft (34 m)
- Length: 15.0 mi (24.1 km)

Basin features
- Tributaries
  - left: Berrys River
  - right: Nippo Brook, Green Hill Brook

The Isinglass River is a 15-mile-long (24 km) river in Strafford County in southeastern New Hampshire, United States. It rises at Bow Lake in the town of Strafford, but is also fed through its tributaries by Ayer's, Nippo, Round and Long ponds in Barrington. The Isinglass flows east to meet the Cochecho River in the southern corner of Rochester. The river is part of the Piscataqua River watershed.

== The name ==
In History of the Town of Rochester, N.H., published 1892, author Franklin McDuffee remarks that the Isinglass River is "probably named from the mica in its bed or along its banks." Isinglass is a synonym for mica, an abundance of which makes rock at the Isinglass River sparkle.

== Isinglass River Management Plan ==
The Isinglass River Management Plan is a state-supported plan implemented to protect the Isinglass River, the river corridor, and the greater Isinglass watershed. The Isinglass River is one of 15 rivers in the state of New Hampshire that are recognized for having outstanding natural and cultural resources. The state appointed a group called the Isinglass River Local Advisory Committee (IRLAC) to carry out the plan to ensure this status. Their goal is to protect the natural, recreational, cultural, and historical resources. They are protecting resource values of the river by trying to maintain a natural state of the river by working to limit development along the river and its tributaries and also to prevent the loss of forested land within the watershed. They also work to make sure no new dams are constructed, no channel alterations will be made that will be damaging, and also to maintain good water quality. Places on board with carrying out this management plan include the towns of Barrington and Strafford and the city of Rochester.

=== Getting started ===
In 2000 a group of Barrington Middle School students, nicknamed "Kids of the River", and two of their parents created a group called the Isinglass River Protection Project (IRPP). They educated themselves about the river and made it their goal to promote the protection and conservation of the river. They testified before the New Hampshire House of Representatives in favor of nominating the Isinglass River for designation under the NH Rivers Management and Protection Plan (RMPP). The nomination was accepted and in 2002 the river became designated under the plan. Once the river was designated, the Isinglass River Local Advisory Committee (IRLAC) was formed and several members of the IRPP were appointed to it.

=== Moving forward ===
After receiving a grant from the NH Coastal Program, "Isinglass River Management Plan: Building Public Awareness and Support", in the spring of 2004, the IRLAC set out to inform people of the designation of the river by the state and also to show people the necessity in protecting the natural resources of the river. The goal was to get the rest of the community to join the movement for conservation. They began to also check building plans and road construction plans to make sure the river would not be negatively affected. They began doing water tests at several different locations, and the quality has shown to be improving over the years.

=== Success ===
In 2008, a proposal by the town of Strafford and a couple of other groups was ranked number 1 in the nation out of 44 potential projects that were eligible for federal Coastal and Estuarine Land Conservation Program (CELCP) funding. The project will prevent a 58-unit housing development that would take up 7,800 feet (2,400 m) of river frontage along the Isinglass. The river is also being utilized for more activities such as hiking, fishing, and kayaking. Waste Management of NH, which has an operating facility in Rochester, also has worked to create hiking trails and encourage conservation of the area. One of the Waste Management trails leads to Locke's Falls, one of the most attractive views along the river. There are many public fishing areas to utilize, and the New Hampshire Fish and Game Department stocks the river annually with about 5,000 Brook and Rainbow Trout. Monitoring of water quality at different spots along the river has shown that since the implementation of the plan, the dissolved oxygen levels (D.O), pH levels, turbidity, specific conductance, and E.coli levels, have all risen to meet the standards of a class B river. The efforts at both the state and local levels have proven to be effective in helping preserve one of the few natural rivers left in New Hampshire. Today the local committees are working to make sure that the river is protected and that as little development as possible is done along the river.

== See also ==
- List of rivers of New Hampshire
