= J. Edward Richardson =

American architect

- Born: September 27, 1873; Dover, New Hampshire
- Occupation: Architect
- Buildings: Cate Academy, Odd Fellows Home, Dover Municipal Building

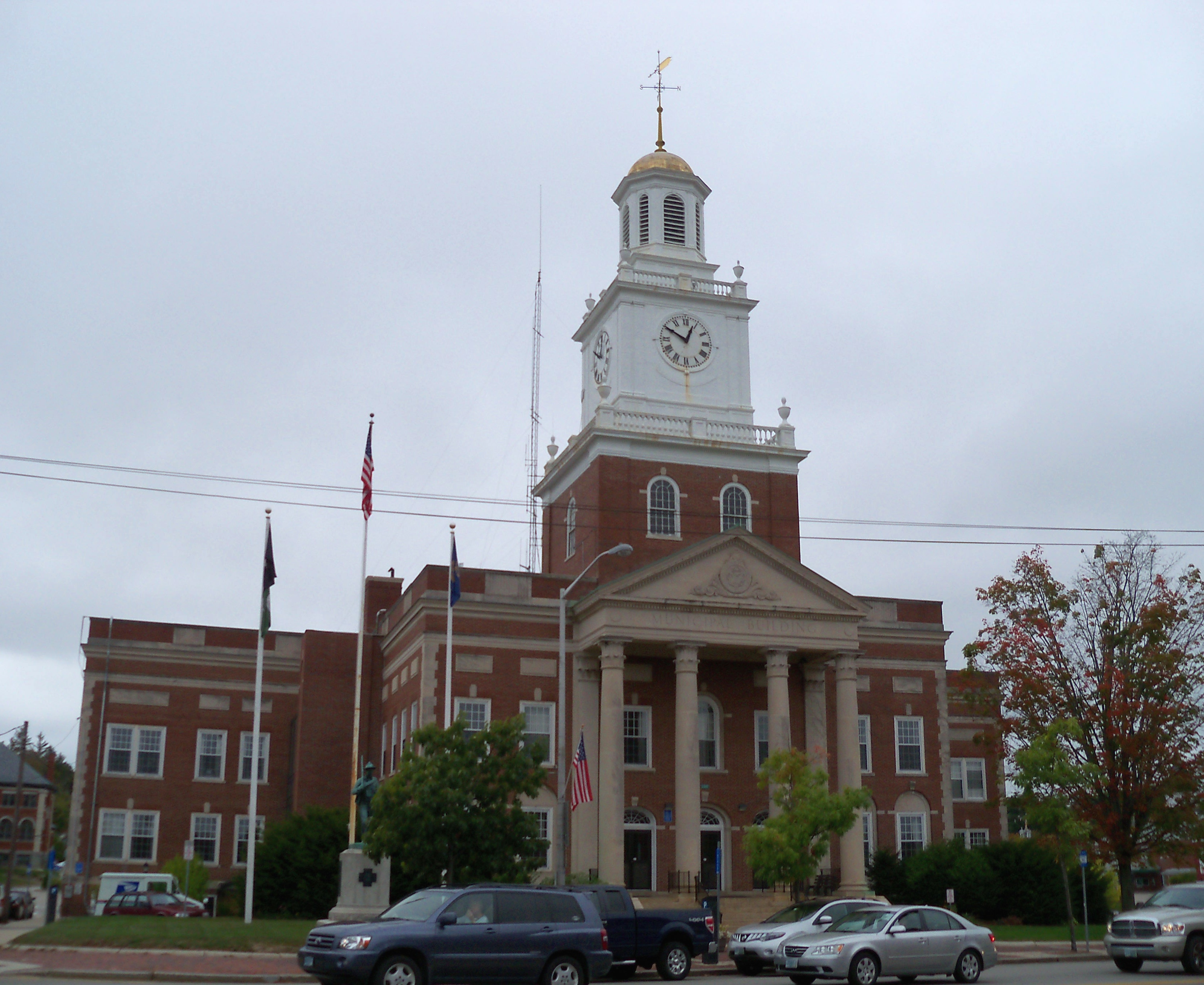
Municipal Building, Dover, 1934

J. Edward Richardson (born 1873) was an American architect from Dover, New Hampshire.

Richardson was born in Dover on September 27, 1873, to J. Herbert and Jettie (Huntress) Richardson. After completing his education in the public schools, he began the study of architecture. He opened his own office at a young age in 1894. Richardson would grow to become a prominent local architect, especially after the retirement of Alvah T. Ramsdell a few years before World War II.

== Architectural work ==
Richardson designed two important public buildings in Dover, bookending his known career. The first of these is the Central Fire Station, on Broadway. Built in 1899, this is a spare Queen Anne-style design. It does, however, hint of the coming Classical and Colonial Revivals. The other design is the large Dover Municipal Building, or City Hall. Dover's third, it is a much more academic interpretation of the Colonial Revival, inspired by Independence Hall. An important semi-public work was the New Hampshire Odd Fellows Home in Concord, designed in 1931 in the Colonial Revival style.

He also designed several schools, most notably the campus of the Austin-Cate Academy in Center Strafford. Built in 1902, this was a typical wooden Colonial Revival school. Richardson also designed a dormitory for the academy, built in 1910. In 1933, the school was destroyed in a fire. Richardson was brought back to rebuild it in brick, and it remains. The former campus is now owned by the New Hampshire National Guard. In 1927 Richardson designed the High School at Berwick, Maine, to replace a building that had burned. It is sparsely ornamented in the Colonial Revival style. The school was vacated in 2001 and listed on the National Register of Historic Places in 2012.

In 1908 Richardson rebuilt the American House in Dover, which had been heavily damaged in a fire. He chose to keep the Greek Revival portico, but replace the upper floors with more modern Colonial Revival styling. The hotel was demolished circa 1960. In 1929 he designed a fraternity house in Durham for the Zeta chapter of Theta Chi. At 22 Madbury Road, this is a large, Georgian Revival house with a gambrel roof. The house was later converted into apartments. The architect's other identified private commission was the Grant Block of 1933, at Main and Fore streets in Somersworth. In keeping with the Depression, he designed the building almost entirely without ornament, and it is enlivened only by its colored tapestry brick facade.

== Gallery ==
Austin-Cate Academy
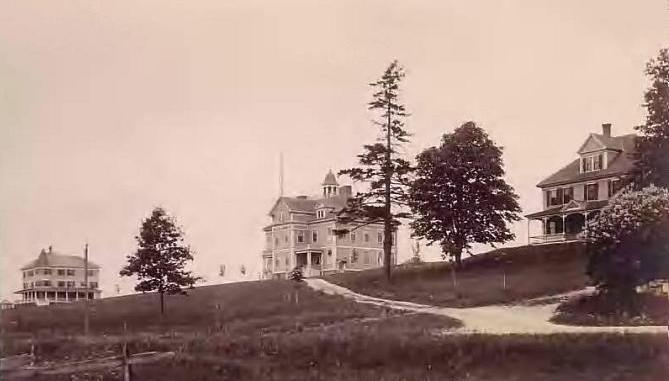
Cate Academy, Center Strafford, 1902

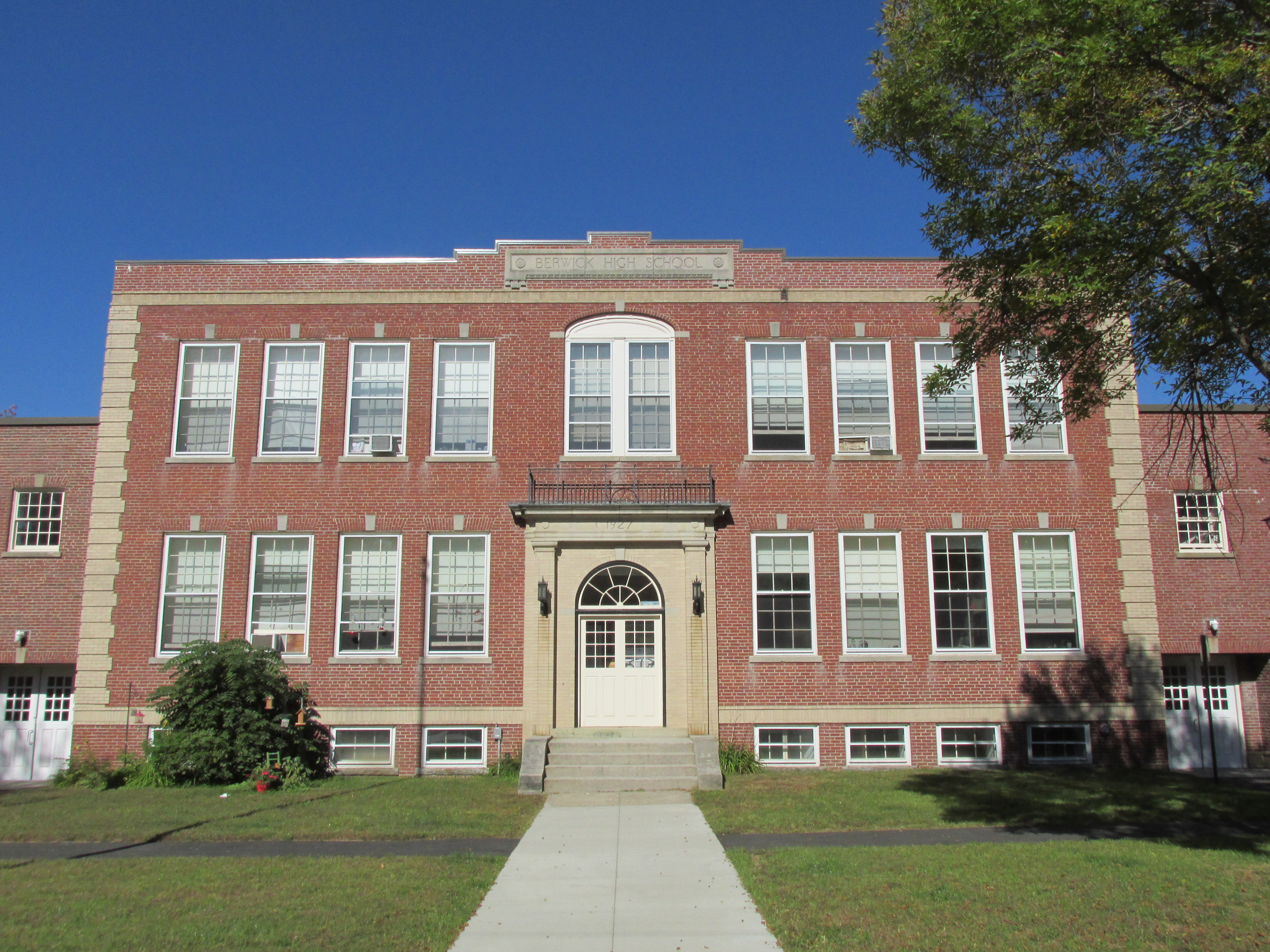
High School, Berwick, 1927
