= Matthew Towne =

American politician

Member of the New Hampshire House of Representatives
- In office December 5, 2018 – December 1, 2020
- Succeeded by: Heath Howard
- Constituency: Strafford 4

Personal details
- Party: Democratic

Matthew D. Towne is an American politician from New Hampshire. He served in the New Hampshire House of Representatives.

Towne endorsed the Elizabeth Warren 2020 presidential campaign.
