= Center Strafford, New Hampshire =

Unincorporated community in New Hampshire, United States

- Unincorporated community
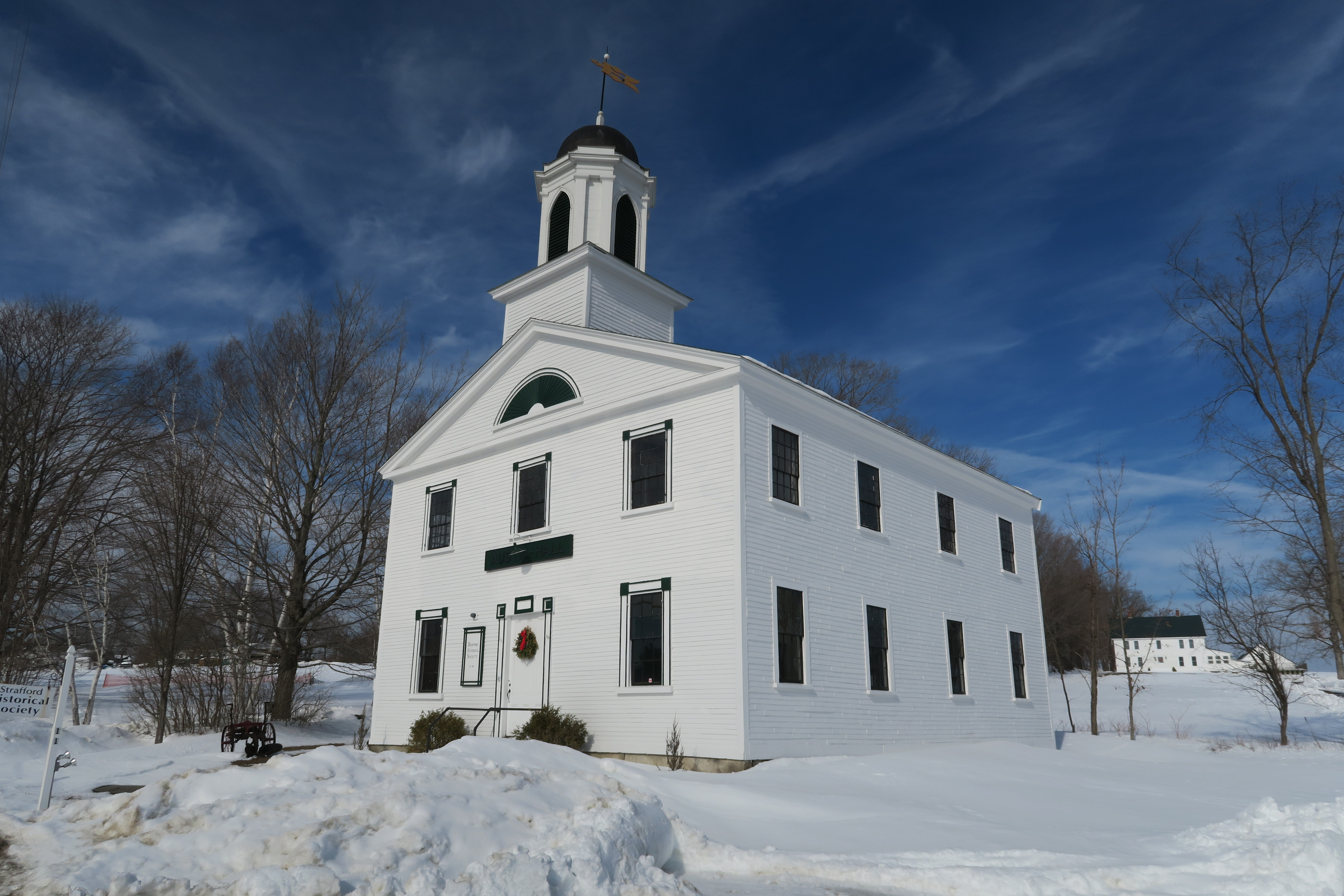
- Austin Hall, Strafford Historic Society

- Location within New Hampshire Location within the United States
- Coordinates: 43°16′12″N 71°07′31″W
- Country: United States
- State: New Hampshire
- County: Strafford
- Town: Strafford
- Elevation: 594 ft (181 m)
- Time zone: UTC-5 (Eastern (EST))
  - Summer (DST): UTC-4 (EDT)
- ZIP code: 03815
- Area code: 603
- GNIS feature ID: 866088

Center Strafford is an unincorporated community in the town of Strafford, New Hampshire, United States. It is one of the two principal settlements in the town, along with Bow Lake Village.

The village is located at the intersection of New Hampshire Route 126 and Route 202A. Route 126 connects Center Strafford with Barnstead to the northwest and Barrington to the southeast. Route 202A connects the village with Northwood to the southwest and Rochester to the northeast.

Strafford School, serving kindergarten through eighth grade for the town of Strafford, is located in the village, as is the Hill Library. The former Austin Cate Academy (now garrisoned by the 195th Regiment (RTI), New Hampshire Army National Guard), plus the town offices, post office, and Austin Hall (Strafford Historical Society) are all in Center Strafford. The village has a separate ZIP code (03815) from the rest of the town of Strafford, including Bow Lake Village.
