= Strafford, New Hampshire =

- Town
- Seal

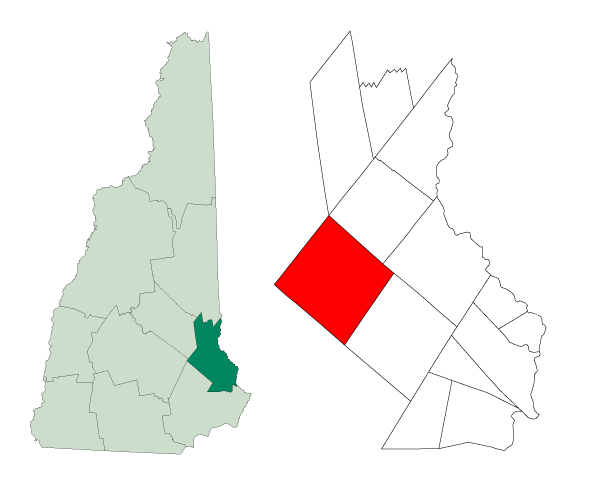
- Location within Strafford County, New Hampshire
- Coordinates: 43°16′13″N 71°07′34″W
- Country: United States
- State: New Hampshire
- County: Strafford
- Incorporated: 1820
- Villages: Bow Lake Village; Center Strafford; Strafford

Area
  - Total: 51.2 sq mi (132.7 km^{2})
  - Land: 49.0 sq mi (127.0 km^{2})
  - Water: 2.2 sq mi (5.7 km^{2})
- Elevation: 584 ft (178 m)

Population (2020)
  - Total: 4,230
  - Density: 86/sq mi (33.3/km^{2})
- Time zone: UTC-5 (EST)
  - Summer (DST): UTC-4 (EDT)
- ZIP code: 03884
- Area code: 603
- FIPS code: 33-73860
- GNIS feature ID: 873726
- Website: strafford.nh.gov

Strafford is a town in Strafford County, New Hampshire, United States. The population was 4,230 at the 2020 census. The two main settlements in town are Center Strafford and Bow Lake Village.

== History ==
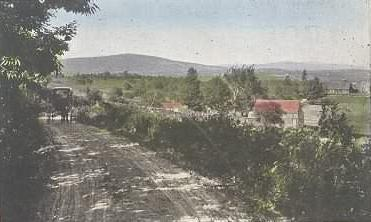
The Blue Hills and the Job Hills from Northwood Road c. 1910

Once part of Barrington, Strafford was set off due to the lengthy travel required to attend town meetings. Settled prior to the Revolution, the town incorporated in 1820, taking its name from the county in which it is located. Strafford County had been organized in 1773 during the administration of colonial governor John Wentworth, and named in honor of Thomas Wentworth, 1st Earl of Strafford.

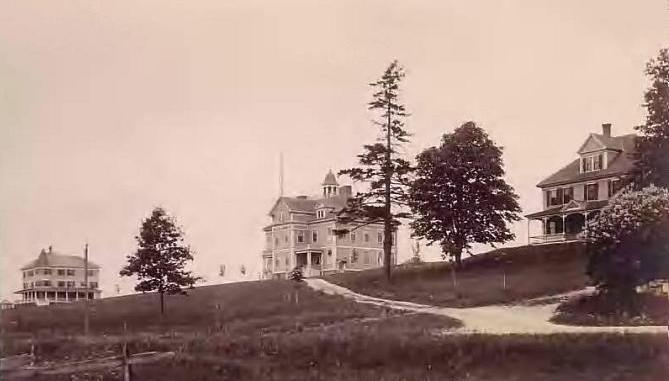
Austin Cate Academy c. 1912

The Austin Academy once stood in the center of Strafford village. George Cate, (Note: George N. Cate was born in Wolfeboro, New Hampshire, and lived for many years in Marlborough, Massachusetts—he was described as a builder, lumber dealer, and former bank trustee at the time of his death in 1901, aged 76.) a wealthy shoe manufacturer, visited the school at the request of its principal Alvin E. Thomas and was so impressed with the school that he left at his death $200,000 (Note: Shortly after his death, Cate's donation was reported as $20,000 ($774,000 in 2025) with the remainder of his estate to go to the academy after the death of his widow.) on the condition that his name be added to that of Mr. Austin. After his death, the hundred-acre farm of George Washington Foss was purchased, and soon a beautiful new building, designed by well-known New Hampshire architect J. Edward Richardson, sat on the hill with the name on its façade, "Austin-Cate Academy - 1903". The property has been purchased by the state for a National Guard training center. The Foss farmhouse that was used as a dormitory burned in 1961 and was replaced with a one-story dormitory. The main building had burned in the early 1930s and was replaced with the brick building, also designed by Richardson, that is there now.

== Geography ==
According to the United States Census Bureau, the town has a total area of 51.2 square miles (132.7 km^{2}), of which 49.0 square miles (127.0 km^{2}) are land and 2.2 square miles (5.7 km^{2}) are water, comprising 4.27% of the town. Bow Lake covers 1,160 acres (470 ha) in the southern part of town. Strafford is drained by the Isinglass River and its tributary the Berrys River, and by the Big River. The Isinglass River flows east to the Cocheco River in Dover and is part of the Piscataqua River watershed, while the Big River flows west to the Suncook River in Barnstead and is part of the Merrimack River watershed.

The Blue Hills Range divides the town in half, running southwest to northeast. Parker Mountain, the highest point in the range and in Strafford, rises to 1,420 feet (430 m) above sea level. It is the most prominent peak in Strafford County.

== Demographics ==
Historical population
Census	Pop.	Note	%±
1820	2,144		—
1830	2,200		2.6%
1840	2,021		−8.1%
1850	1,920		−5.0%
1860	2,047		6.6%
1870	1,669		−18.5%
1880	1,531		−8.3%
1890	1,304		−14.8%
1900	1,040		−20.2%
1910	786		−24.4%
1920	764		−2.8%
1930	617		−19.2%
1940	714		15.7%
1950	770		7.8%
1960	722		−6.2%
1970	965		33.7%
1980	1,663		72.3%
1990	2,965		78.3%
2000	3,626		22.3%
2010	3,991		10.1%
2020	4,230		6.0%
U.S. Decennial Census

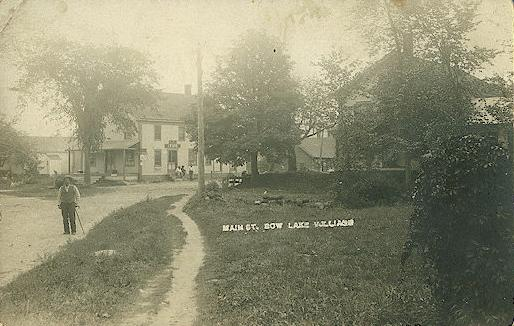
Bow Lake Village c. 1912

As of the census of 2000, there were 3,626 people, 1,281 households, and 1,022 families residing in the town. The population density was 73.7 inhabitants per square mile (28.5/km^{2}). There were 1,564 housing units at an average density of 31.8 per square mile (12.3/km^{2}). The racial makeup of the town was 98.48% White, 0.14% African American, 0.14% Native American, 0.25% Asian, 0.06% from other races, and 0.94% from two or more races. Hispanic or Latino of any race were 0.63% of the population.

There were 1,281 households, out of which 43.2% had children under the age of 18 living with them, 68.5% were married couples living together, 8.2% had a female householder with no husband present, and 20.2% were non-families. 15.1% of all households were made up of individuals, and 4.4% had someone living alone who was 65 years of age or older. The average household size was 2.82 and the average family size was 3.14.

In the town, the population was spread out, with 30.0% under the age of 18, 4.8% from 18 to 24, 32.1% from 25 to 44, 25.4% from 45 to 64, and 7.7% who were 65 years of age or older. The median age was 37 years. For every 100 females, there were 100.1 males. For every 100 females age 18 and over, there were 95.1 males.

The median income for a household in the town was $59,044, and the median income for a family was $62,238. Males had a median income of $40,423 versus $30,524 for females. The per capita income for the town was $23,500. About 1.0% of families and 1.9% of the population were below the poverty line, including 1.5% of those under age 18 and 5.4% of those age 65 or over.

== Notable person ==
- Charles Simic (born 1938), fifteenth US Poet Laureate (2007–2008)

== See also ==
- Strafford Union Academy, listed on the U.S. National Register of Historic Places
- New Hampshire Historical Marker No. 291: Strafford Union Academy 1833–1903 / Austin-Cate Academy 1904–1981
