= Bow Lake (New Hampshire) =

Lake in New Hampshire, United States

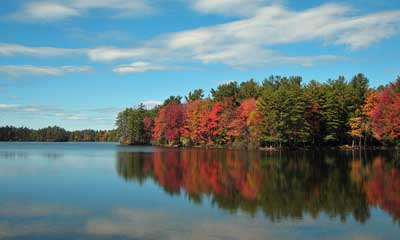
- Bow Lake in autumn as seen from the town dock in Strafford, NH

- Location in New Hampshire Location in the United States
- Location: Strafford County and Rockingham County, New Hampshire
- Coordinates: 43°14′56″N 71°10′54″W
- Primary inflows: Sherburne Brook
- Primary outflows: Isinglass River
- Basin countries: United States
- Max. length: 2.8 mi (4.5 km)
- Max. width: 1.2 mi (1.9 km)
- Surface area: 1,149 acres (465 ha)
- Average depth: 10 ft (3.0 m)
- Max. depth: 65 ft (20 m)
- Surface elevation: 515 ft (157 m)
- Islands: 7 named: Bennett Island; Loon Island; Long Island; Beech Island; Pine Island; Rye Island; York Island
- Settlements: Strafford (Bow Lake Village); Northwood

Bow Lake is a 1,149-acre (465 ha) water body located in Strafford and Rockingham counties in eastern New Hampshire, United States, in the towns of Strafford and Northwood. Its outlet is the Isinglass River, flowing east to the Atlantic Ocean via the Cocheco and Piscataqua rivers.

The lake is classified as a cold- and warmwater fishery, with observed species including rainbow trout, brown trout, smallmouth bass, largemouth bass, chain pickerel, horned pout, and white perch.

Every year there are fireworks of Strafford and Northwood over Bow Lake, and it is a popular place to swim, boat and fish for those who live in the towns around it.

== See also ==
- List of lakes in New Hampshire
