= Bow Lake Village, New Hampshire =

Unincorporated community in New Hampshire, United States

- Unincorporated community
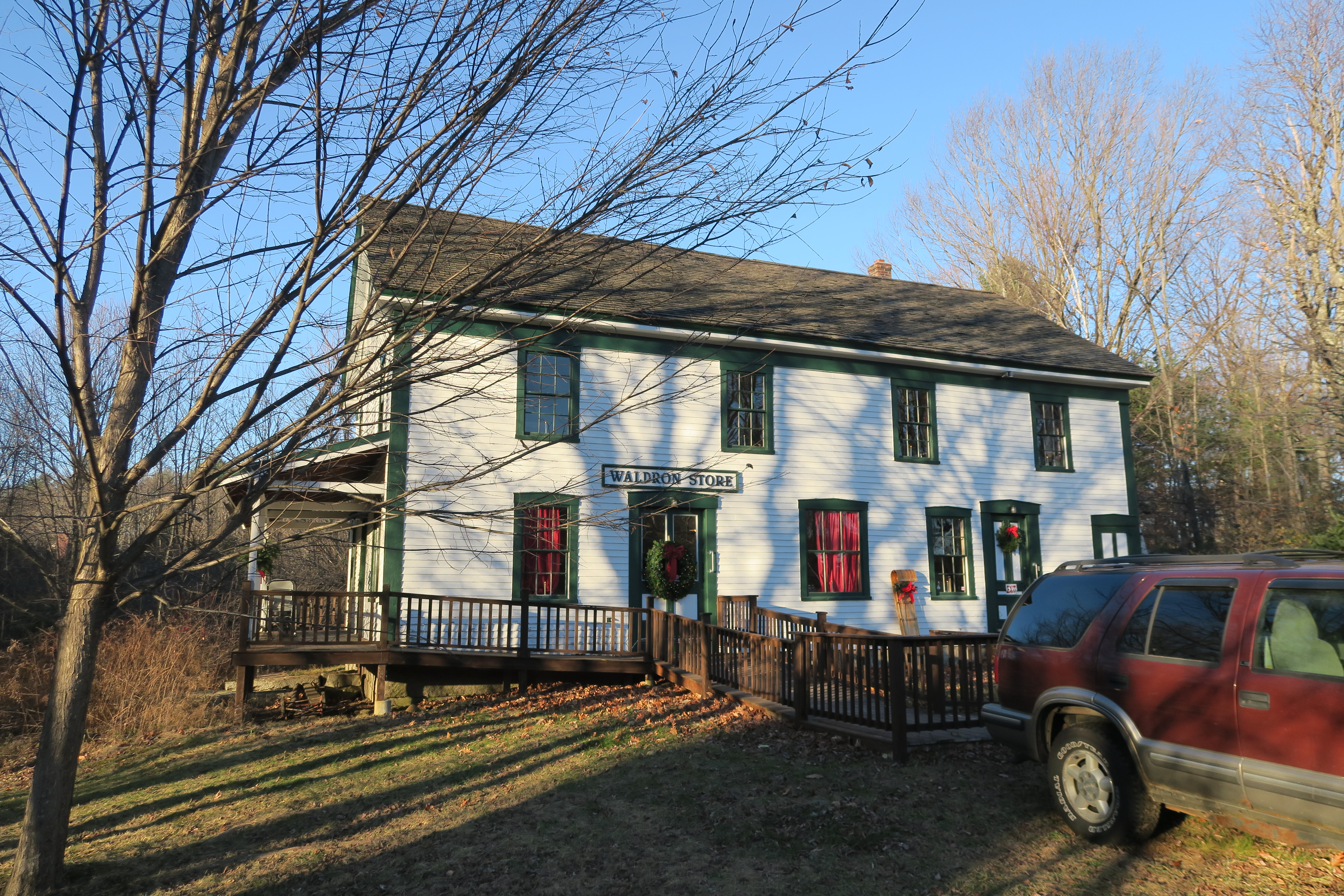
- Waldron Store

- Location within New Hampshire Location within the United States
- Coordinates: 43°14′29″N 71°09′02″W
- Country: United States
- State: New Hampshire
- County: Strafford
- Town: Strafford
- Elevation: 518 ft (158 m)
- Time zone: UTC-5 (Eastern (EST))
  - Summer (DST): UTC-4 (EDT)
- ZIP code: 03884
- Area code: 603
- GNIS feature ID: 873304

Bow Lake Village is a small unincorporated community in the town of Strafford, New Hampshire, United States, located at the outlet of Bow Lake. The village is home to the Bow Lake Grange, Isinglass Country Store, 7C's Kitchen and Market (formerly the Blue Loon, Sheila's, and Uncle George's), the old Waldron Store (owned by the Strafford Historical Society) and the Independence Inn & Heartwood Restaurant (formerly the Bow Lake Inn). The village's main roads are New Hampshire Route 202A, which connects it to Northwood and Center Strafford; Province Road, which follows the north shore of the lake; and Water Street, which follows the south shore.
