= Barrington, New Hampshire =

- Town
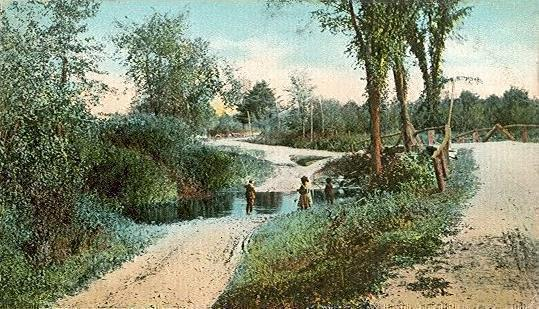
- Tom Ham Brook c. 1910

- Flag Seal

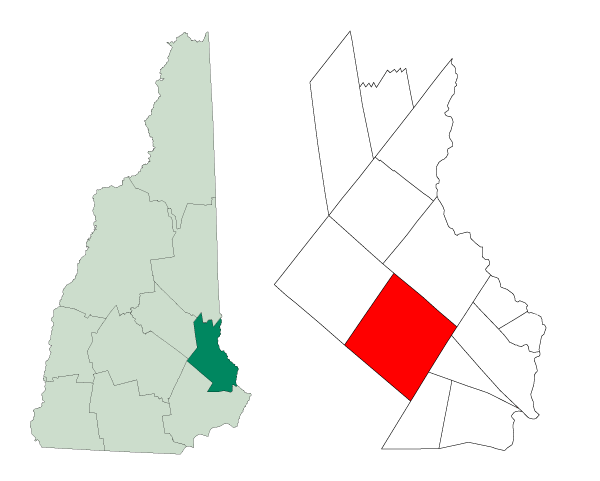
- Location within Strafford County, New Hampshire
- Coordinates: 43°13′22″N 71°02′49″W
- Country: United States
- State: New Hampshire
- County: Strafford
- Settled: 1699
- Incorporated: 1722
- Villages: Barrington; East Barrington; West Barrington

Area
  - Total: 48.6 sq mi (125.9 km^{2})
  - Land: 46.6 sq mi (120.8 km^{2})
  - Water: 2.0 sq mi (5.1 km^{2})
- Elevation: 312 ft (95 m)

Population (2020)
  - Total: 9,326
  - Density: 200/sq mi (77.2/km^{2})
- Time zone: UTC-5 (EST)
  - Summer (DST): UTC-4 (EDT)
- ZIP code: 03825
- Area code: 603
- FIPS code: 33-03460
- GNIS feature ID: 873538
- Website: www.barrington.nh.gov

Barrington is a town in Strafford County, New Hampshire, United States. The population was 9,326 at the 2020 census, up from 8,576 at the 2010 census. The town is a woodland, farm and commuter town.

== History ==
Barrington was incorporated in 1722 and named for Samuel Shute of Barrington Hall, colonial governor of Massachusetts and New Hampshire. His brother was John Shute Barrington, 1st Viscount Barrington.

The town was made up of two grants, the first containing all of Strafford and present-day Barrington except for a parcel two miles (3.2 km) wide called New Portsmouth, or the Two Mile Streak. This second grant had been set aside to provide fuel and home sites for imported workers at the Lamprey River Iron Works, chartered in 1719 by the Massachusetts General Court to encourage industrial development in the province.

Slow at first to be settled because of rocky soil, Barrington by 1810 had 3,564 residents, then the state's third largest town, its primary industry the smelting of iron ore. The Isinglass River, together with its tributaries, provided water power for grist, fulling and saw mills. In 1820, Strafford was set off from Barrington, reducing its land area by about half, because of lengthy travel required to attend town meetings.

In 1882, the Reverend Alonzo Hall Quint wrote:

"Of those towns in the state whose scenery is somewhat quiet, one of the most beautiful is Barrington."

Indeed, the town's attractive natural features, including rivers, brooks, waterfalls and not less than 14 ponds, are summarized by the name of a 374-foot (114 m) summit, Beauty Hill. Barrington is bisected by the Calef Highway (New Hampshire Route 125), named for a state senator from the 1800s whose family also founded in 1869 a locally famous general store that remains in operation.

== Geography ==
According to the United States Census Bureau, the town has a total area of 48.6 square miles (125.9 km^{2}), of which 46.6 square miles (120.8 km^{2}) are land and 2.0 square miles (5.1 km^{2}) are water, comprising 4.05% of the town. Barrington is drained by the Isinglass River and Bellamy River. Swains Lake and Mendum's Pond are in the south. The highest point in town is an unnamed summit near its western border, measuring 610 feet (190 m) above sea level. The highest named summit is Bumfagging Hill, at 601 ft (183 m). Barrington lies fully within the Piscataqua River (Coastal) watershed.

The commercial center of town is the village of East Barrington, centered on the junction of state routes 9 and 125.

== Demographics ==
Historical population
Census	Pop.	Note	%±
1790	2,470		—
1800	2,773		12.3%
1810	3,564		28.5%
1820	1,610		−54.8%
1830	1,895		17.7%
1840	1,845		−2.6%
1850	1,752		−5.0%
1860	1,963		12.0%
1870	1,581		−19.5%
1880	1,497		−5.3%
1890	1,408		−5.9%
1900	1,208		−14.2%
1910	900		−25.5%
1920	616		−31.6%
1930	613		−0.5%
1940	780		27.2%
1950	1,052		34.9%
1960	1,036		−1.5%
1970	1,865		80.0%
1980	4,404		136.1%
1990	6,164		40.0%
2000	7,475		21.3%
2010	8,576		14.7%
2020	9,326		8.7%
U.S. Decennial Census

As of the census of 2000, there were 7,475 people, 2,756 households, and 2,075 families residing in the town. The population density was 160.5 inhabitants per square mile (62.0/km^{2}). There were 3,147 housing units at an average density of 67.6 per square mile (26.1/km^{2}). The racial makeup of the town was 98.11% White, 0.25% African American, 0.13% Native American, 0.41% Asian, 0.05% Pacific Islander, 0.23% from other races, and 0.80% from two or more races. Hispanic or Latino of any race were 0.92% of the population.

There were 2,756 households, out of which 38.8% had children under the age of 18 living with them, 64.6% were married couples living together, 6.5% had a female householder with no husband present, and 24.7% were non-families. 16.9% of all households were made up of individuals, and 4.3% had someone living alone who was 65 years of age or older. The average household size was 2.71 and the average family size was 3.07.

In the town, the population was spread out, with 27.5% under the age of 18, 5.7% from 18 to 24, 35.1% from 25 to 44, 24.7% from 45 to 64, and 7.0% who were 65 years of age or older. The median age was 37 years. For every 100 females, there were 104.1 males. For every 100 females age 18 and over, there were 101.7 males.

The median income for a household in the town was $50,630, and the median income for a family was $56,136. Males had a median income of $39,098 versus $27,956 for females. The per capita income for the town was $21,012. About 3.6% of families and 5.5% of the population were below the poverty line, including 7.0% of those under age 18 and none of those age 65 or over.

== Education ==
The Barrington School District serves town children from Pre-K through grade 8, at the Early Childhood Learning Center (ECLC), Barrington Elementary School and the Barrington Middle School. As part of the school district, students of high school age attend school in a neighboring community, either Dover High School, Coe-Brown Northwood Academy, or Oyster River High School.

== Notable people ==
- John Buzzell (1766–1863), Free Will Baptist preacher, writer
- Paul Frase (born 1965), American pro-football player for four teams, co-founder Joshua Frase Foundation
- Frank Jones (1832–1902), brewer, hotelier, U.S. congressman
- Jillian Wheeler (born 1991), singer, songwriter and actress

== See also ==
- New Hampshire Historical Marker No. 96: The Two-Mile Streak
- New Hampshire Historical Marker No. 212: Deputy Sheriff Charles E. Smith 1843–1891
- New Hampshire Historical Marker No. 279: The Balch Household Graves
