= West Beach =

West Beach may refer to:

Australia

- West Beach, South Australia
- West Beach, Western Australia

United States

- West Beach (Santa Barbara), California
- West Beach, Beverly, Massachusetts

South Africa

- West Beach, Western Cape

== See also ==
- Westbeach, British TV series
