= Shirley Brice Heath =

American linguist (born 1939)

Shirley Brice Heath (born July 26, 1939) is an American linguistic anthropologist, and professor emerita, Margery Bailey Professorship in English, at Stanford University.

She graduated from Lynchburg College, Ball State University, and Columbia University, with a Ph.D. in 1970. She is a Brown University professor-at-large, and a visiting research professor at the Watson Institute.

== Awards ==
- 1984 MacArthur Fellows Program
- Guggenheim Fellowship
- National Endowment for the Humanities fellowship
- Ford Foundation fellowship
- Rockefeller Foundation fellowship
- 1995 University of Louisville Grawemeyer Award for Education

== Ways With Words: Language, Life, And Work In Communities And Classrooms ==
Shirley Brice Heath is best known as an anthropologist for her ethnographical work in * Ways with Words: Language, Life, And Work In Communities And Classrooms, Cambridge University Press, 1983, ISBN 978-0-521-27319-0. She spent nine years,1969-1978, performing a cross cultural, ethnographical comparison of language practices between two small communities, Trackton and Roadville. Located only 6 miles apart in the central area of the Piedmont region in the Carolinas, both working class textile mill communities had similar demographics in terms of size and average salaries. However, Trackton is predominantly African American and Roadville is a white community. Heath lived and worked among both communities with a goal of identifying the effects of home life and community environment on the style of language used among dwellers, with a final objective to identify how these styles transferred into school settings and beyond. Heath not only immersed herself within both Trackton and Roadville's cultures, she helped identify and improve the curriculum as well as teaching styles needed in order for community members to receive a valuable education. Heath admits herself that Ways' "is not a model for refining new education curriculum but a model for ethnographical research in the field of education .

=== Roadville ===
As a multiple generation textile mill community, Roadville is losing many members of the community to dreams of "moving ahead" in education as well as occupations beyond textile mills. Heath observed the attitudes of the olde time mill workers who frequently reminisce on the "good days" of working in the mills with little desire of leaving the community and receiving higher education. Early language learning among children reveal that they are often exposed to "baby talk" as well as multiple variations of educational based books and toys. Parents in Roadville are responsible for teaching young children what is wrong and right in verbal communication as well as reinforcing morals in the process of story telling. Adults are also expected to practice correct reading techniques with their children during schooling years. Heath reinforces the importance that all sponsors of literacy perform their own ethnographical work in order to appropriately and efficiently educate culturally diverse students .

=== Trackton ===
With regard to this predominantly African American community, Heath suggests that Trackton residents view their time working in the community as temporary. Education is taken very seriously by adults, who dream of owning their own land and houses outside of the community. Exposure to language happens very differently compared to Roadville. Infants in Trackton are rarely talked directly to by adults, but are constantly being physically held and comforted. Children are encouraged to look at contextual clues such as body language in order to develop responses to questions and statements. Adults in Trackton believe that children need to learn how to act around a variety of individuals and should not be told what to say and instead should learn these social skills on their own. Verbal play and "talking junk" is encouraged of children in order to handle situations in which they receive unpredictable responses and eventually lead to mastering the art of story telling. Heath observed that adults do not force children to master the skill of writing literature or even reading, claiming that if it "is necessary it will come"

== Works ==
- Ways with Words: Language, Life, And Work In Communities And Classrooms, Cambridge University Press, 1983, ISBN 978-0-521-27319-0
- Identity and Inner-city Youth: Beyond Ethnicity And Gender, Editors Shirley Brice Heath, Milbrey Wallin McLaughlin, Teachers College Press, 1993, ISBN 978-0-8077-3252-6
- Language in the USA, Editors Charles Albert Ferguson, Shirley Brice Heath, David Hwang, CUP Archive, 1981, ISBN 978-0-521-29834-6
- Children of promise: literate activity in linguistically and culturally diverse classrooms, Editor Shirley Brice Heath, NEA Professional Library, National Education Association, 1991, ISBN 978-0-8106-1844-2
