= 1876 Massachusetts gubernatorial election =

- November 7, 1876
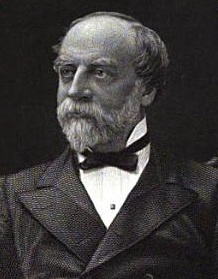

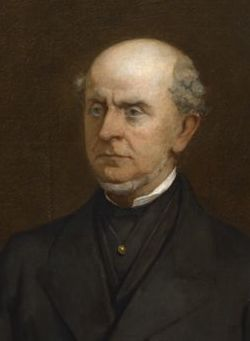
| Nominee | Alexander H. Rice | Charles Francis Adams Sr. |
| Party | Republican | Democratic |
| Popular vote | 137,665 | 106,850 |
| Percentage | 53.59% | 41.59% |
- Rice: 40-50% 50–60% 60–70% 70–80% 80–90% >90% Adams: 40-50% 50–60% 60–70% Tie: 40-50%
Governor before election
Alexander H. Rice
Republican
Elected Governor
Alexander H. Rice
Republican

The 1876 Massachusetts gubernatorial election was held on November 7. Incumbent Republican governor Alexander H. Rice was re-elected to a second term in office over former Minister to the United Kingdom Charles F. Adams.

== Republican nomination ==
=== Candidates ===
- Alexander H. Rice, incumbent governor since January and former mayor of Boston

=== Convention ===
Rice was nominated without opposition at the convention in Worcester on September 5.

== Democratic nomination ==
=== Candidates ===
- Charles F. Adams, former United States Minister to the United Kingdom (1861–68) and member of the Adams family
- William Gaston, former governor (1875–76)

=== Campaign ===
Former governor William Gaston, who had been the party nominee in the prior three elections, was considered an early favorite for a fourth nomination. However, a movement to draft Charles F. Adams, the former Minister to Great Britain during the Civil War, was brought about by New York associates of Governor Samuel Tilden, who had become the party's presidential nominee and national leader at the 1876 Democratic National Convention in June.

At the convention, the boom for Adams was led by delegates from Western Massachusetts and supported on the grounds that an Adams nomination would lend support to Tilden's reformist campaign for president. Opposition to Adams came from conservative Bourbon Democrats, who opposed Adams for his former membership in the Republican Party, and Irish-born Democrats.

=== Convention ===
U.S. representative William W. Warren was named permanent chairman of the convention at Worcester on September 6. He gave a long speech embracing Tilden, Adams, and Gaston and opposed to the Grant administration's policy of protective tariffs and failure to resume specie payments. (Note: Although the Specie Payment Resumption Act passed Congress the year before, Warren argued the Act was "valueless" and would be ineffective.)

When the Committee on Resolutions was announced, competing cheers were made for Patrick Collins, a Gaston supporter from Boston, and James Scollay Whitney, an Adams supporter from the West. Whitney gave a speech explaining that a compromise would be reached between the parties and a recess was called. During the recess, Gaston allegedly received a telegram from Tilden requesting his withdrawal.

During a recess, Gaston withdrew his name from consideration. He was welcomed to the stage and withdrew his name, moving to nominate Adams by acclamation. Whitney declined calls to for him to "Call for the Nays!" and the ticket was carried without dissent recorded. Gaston was made an elector-at-large for the Tilden ticket, though some hoped that he would be nominated for lieutenant governor on the assumption that Adams would join the Tilden cabinet.

There were some rumors that Adams would decline the nomination, but nothing came of them.

== General election ==
=== Campaign ===
The Rice campaign faced opposition from prohibitionists, labor reformers, and conservative Republicans. There were rumors of U.S. representative Benjamin Butler, a powerful kingmaker from Lowell, throwing his support behind Prohibition candidate John I. Baker in revenge for Rice's support of Ebenezer R. Hoar's independent campaign against Butler. The Labor Reform Party also urged support for Baker. Adams's strength was among intellectuals, reformers, and in the West.

During the campaign, U.S. senator James G. Blaine attacked Adams for his conduct during the War and his earlier proposal to preserve slavery by constitutional amendment.

=== Results ===
Ultimately, Rice won re-election with an increased majority, although far smaller than Rutherford B. Hayes's majority in the presidential election, owing to the Prohibition campaign against him.

1876 Massachusetts gubernatorial election
| Party | Candidate | Votes | % | ±% |
|---|---|---|---|---|
| Republican | Alexander H. Rice (incumbent) | 137,665 | 53.59% | |
| Democratic | Charles Francis Adams Sr. | 106,850 | 41.59% | |
| Prohibition | John I. Baker | 12,274 | 4.78% | |
| Others | Others | 115 | 0.05% | |
| Republican hold | | Swing | | |

== See also ==
- 1876 Massachusetts legislature
