= Beverly Farms =

Neighborhood of Beverly, Massachusetts, US

- Neighborhood of Beverly
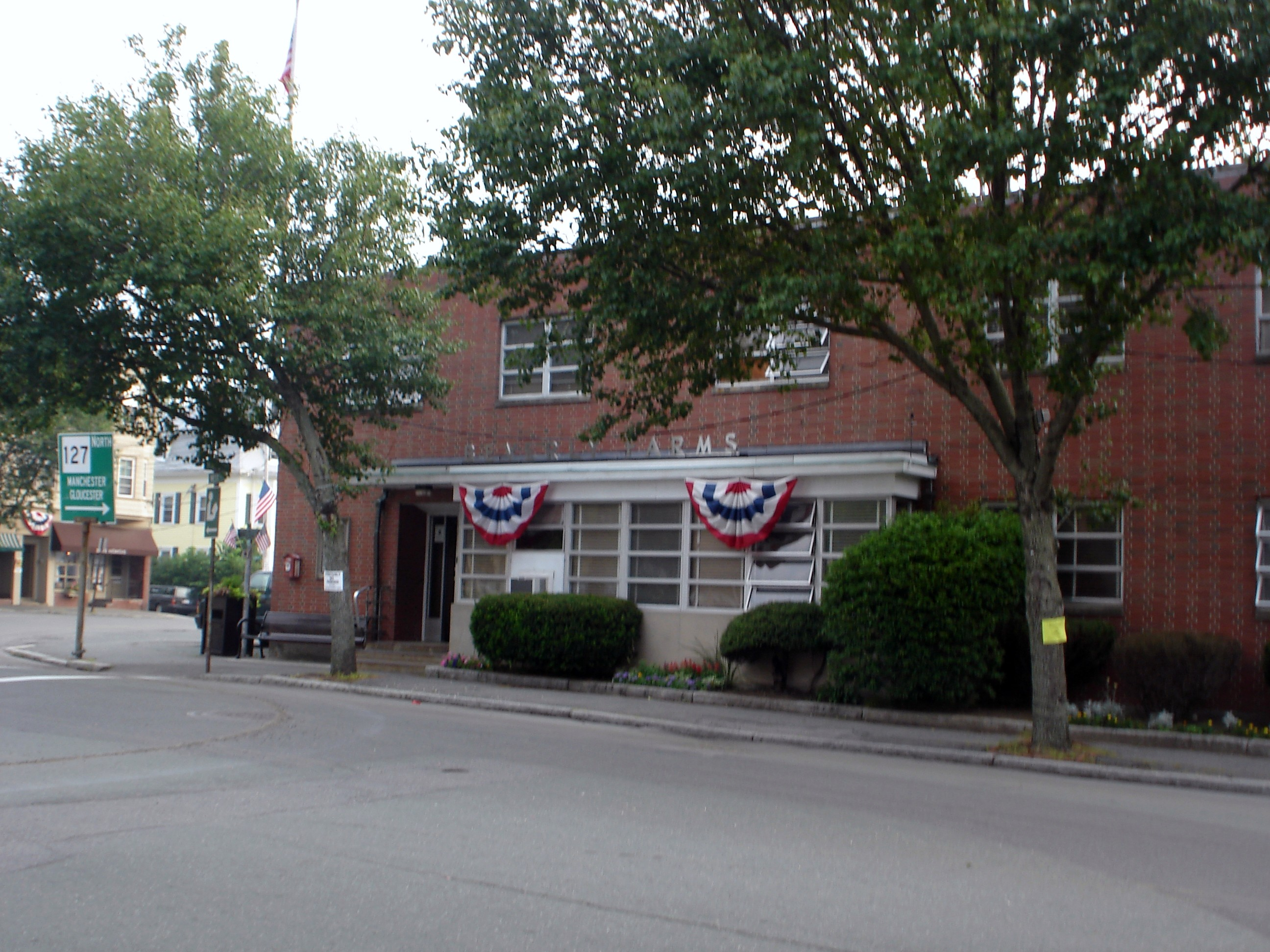
- Beverly Farms Fire Station on the 4th of July in 2006.
- Nickname: Farms
- Motto: "Filled with History and Tradition"
- Interactive map of Beverly Farms
- Country: United States
- State: Massachusetts
- County: Essex
- Neighborhood of: Beverly

Population
  - Total: 7,929
- Time zone: UTC-5 (Eastern)
- Zip Code: 01915
- Area code: 351 / 978

Beverly Farms is a neighborhood comprising the eastern part of the city of Beverly, Massachusetts, in the state's North Shore region, approximately 20 miles north of Boston. Beverly Farms is an oceanfront community with a population of about 3,500, extending west from the Manchester-by-the-Sea border to another section of Beverly, known as Prides Crossing. The western boundary of Beverly Farms is in dispute. For instance, the boundaries of West Beach were defined by Chapter 157 of the Massachusetts Acts and Resolves of 1852, in terms of landmarks and property lines that existed at the time, and those are sometimes used as the boundaries of Beverly Farms. Others have demarcated the Western border as the location at which a local trolley line from downtown Beverly ended; more specifically, this location is called "Chapman's Corner" and is at the corner of Hale and Boyle's Streets.

== History ==
Beverly Farms and the adjacent Prides Crossing were originally farming communities. In the late eighteenth and early nineteenth centuries, wealthy residents of Boston, Philadelphia, Chicago, Washington, D.C., and New York City built summer estates along the seashore. These properties were the size and stature of those in Newport, Rhode Island, though only a few of the original mansions remain in the neighborhood today.

In 1887, Beverly Farms unsuccessfully petitioned the Massachusetts legislature for incorporation as a town. Town Selectman John Baker argued against the incorporation and in response to a bribery scandal, Oliver Ames vetoed the Act.

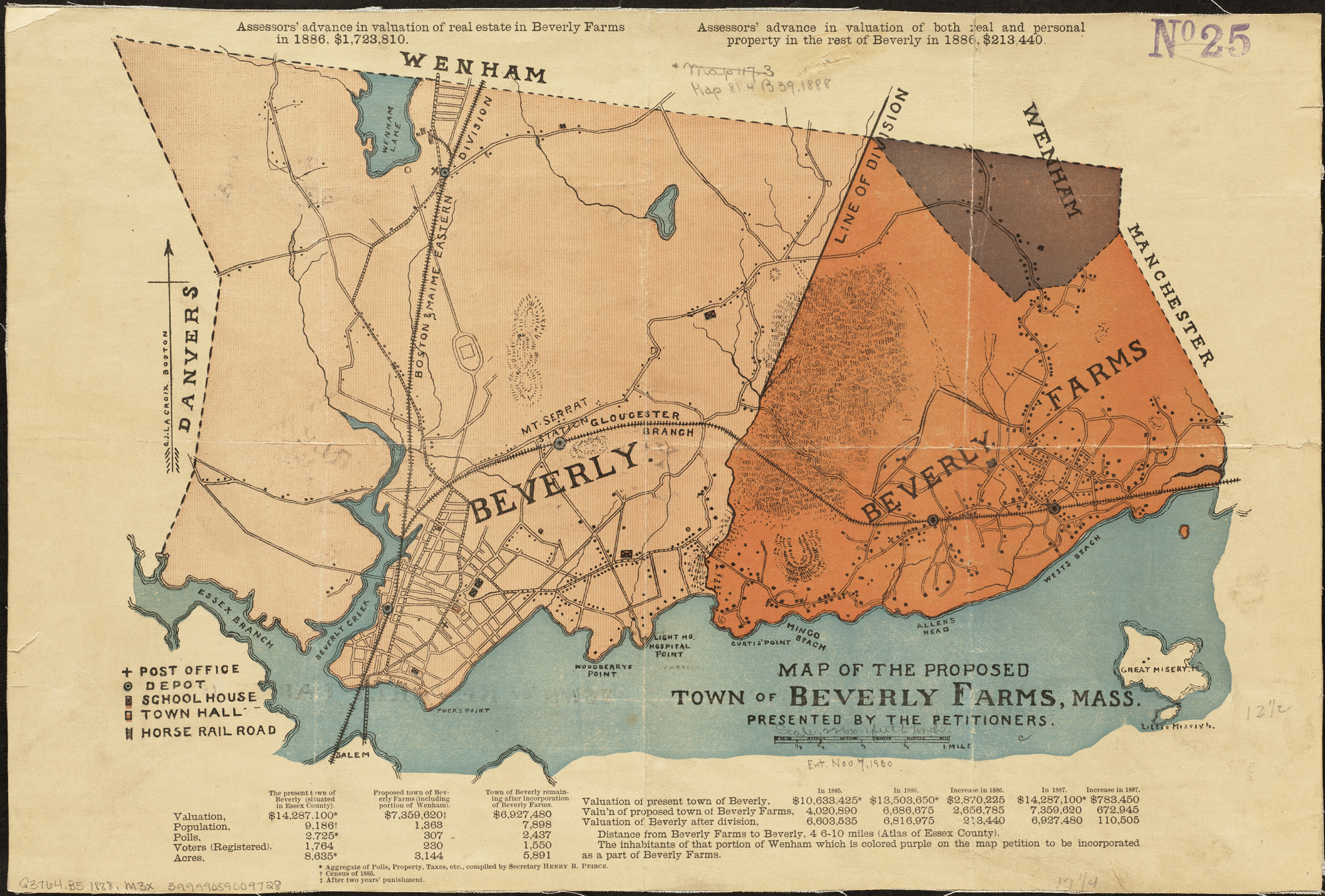
Map of the proposed town of Beverly Farms, Mass.

By the mid-twentieth century, Beverly Farms resembled a small town, somewhat secluded from the rest of Beverly and culturally interlinked with Prides Crossing. A number of working-class neighborhoods appeared around the town. As of 2020, 82% of individuals in the workforce are in White-collar jobs, with 18% working Blue-collar jobs.

Beverly Hills, California, was named in 1907 after Beverly Farms, which was a vacation spot of then-President Taft.

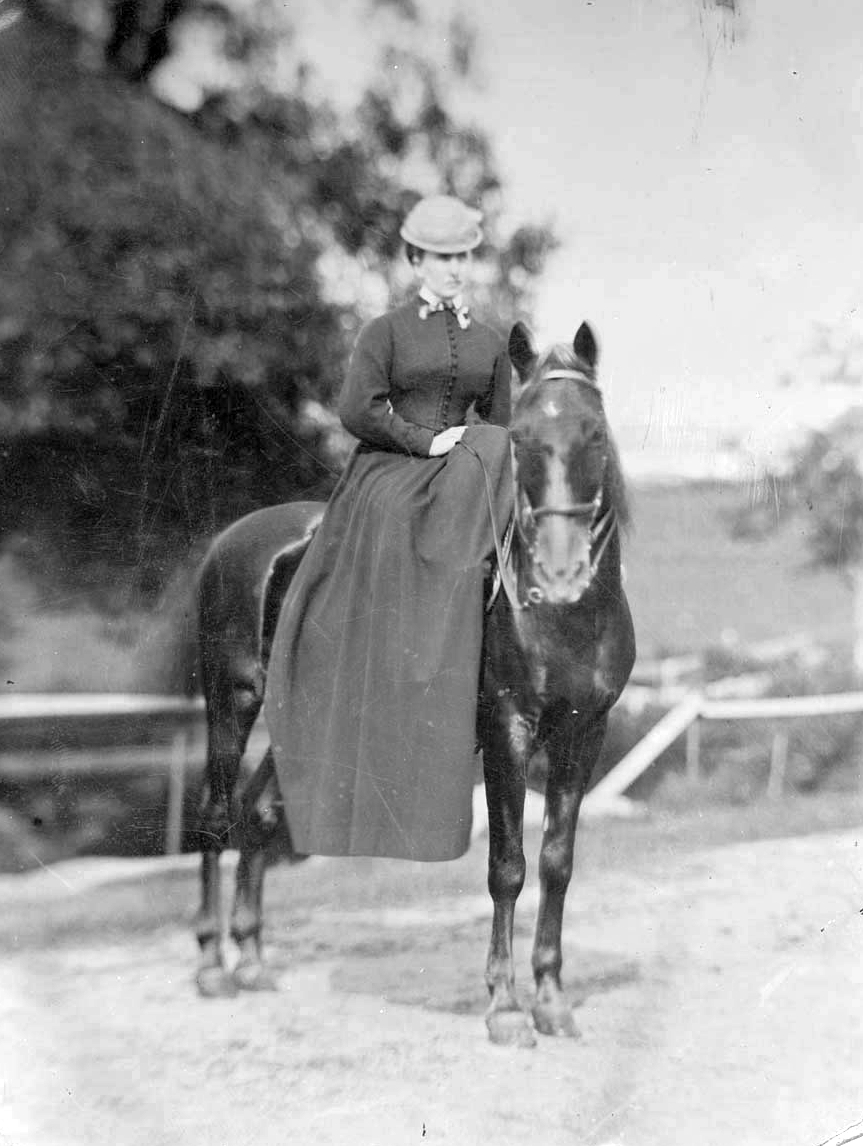
A photograph of Marian Hooper Adams riding on horseback in Beverly Farms.

== Institutions ==
The community is served by three churches: St. John's Episcopal Church, whose altarpiece was sculpted by artist Hildreth Meiere, North Shore Community Baptist Church and St. Margaret of Scotland Catholic Church designed by architect William Ralph Emerson. Among other public buildings are a community center, a fire station, a railroad station on the MBTA Commuter Rail, and a recently expanded branch of the Beverly Public Library.

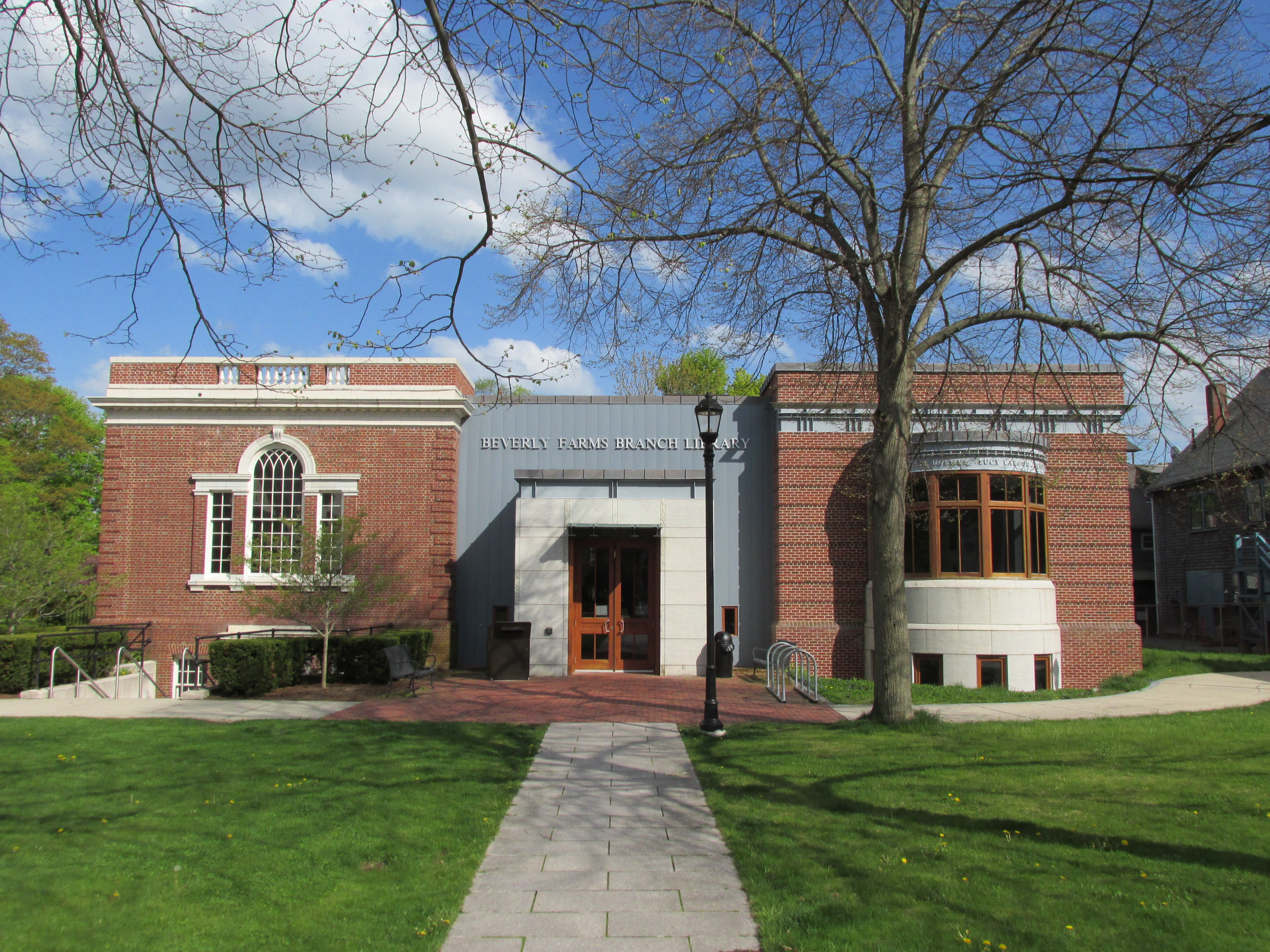
A view of the Beverly Farms public library.

== Lifestyle ==
The Beverly Farms community is most active during the summer months.

The local community beach, West Beach, is owned by the residents of Beverly Farms and Prides Crossing, and is a major attraction during the summer. Current and former residents of the areas are entitled to beach permits, allowing access to West Beach. Non-residents must apply for an access permit; the waiting period is around six to ten years, because of the limited size of the facility.

Annually on the Fourth of July holiday, a private organization of residents raises upwards of $60,000 through fundraisers to fund a weekend-long agenda of activities. The weekend's activities include community dances, children's events, softball games, fireworks above West Beach and the well-known "Horribles" parade. Since 2016, the Horribles parade has generated significant local and State controversy due to perceived racist content.

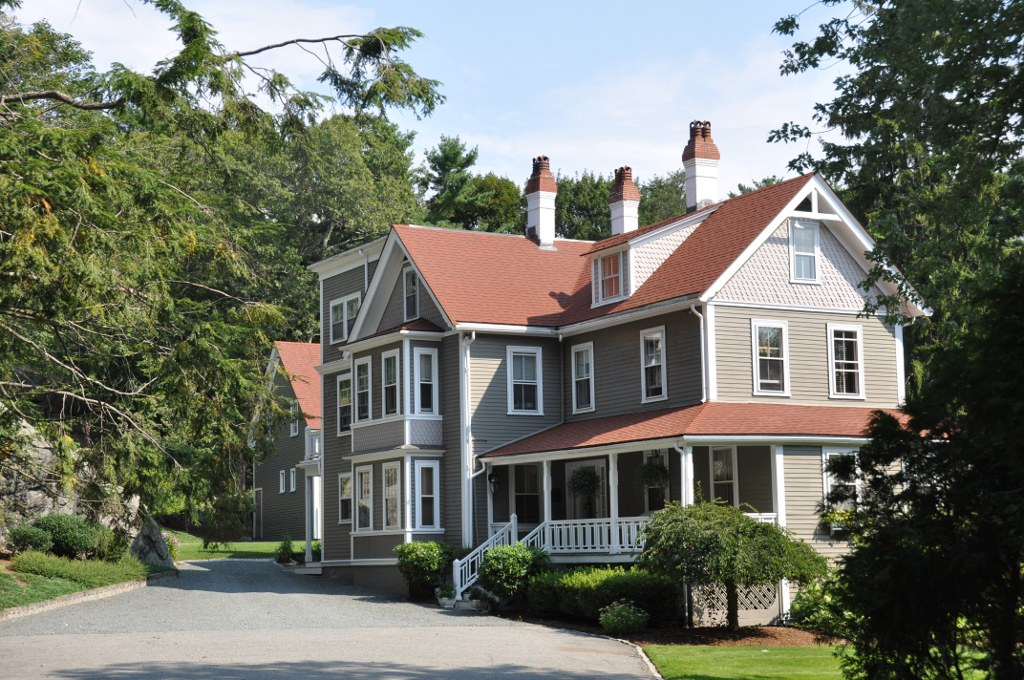
The Oliver Wendell Holmes House is registered on the list of National Register of Historic Places.

== Notable people ==
- Henry Adams, American historian and eminent member of the Adams political family
- Catherine Eddy Beveridge, socialite
- Oliver Wendell Holmes Jr., associate justice of the Supreme Court
- Levi Leiter, retailer and founder of Marshall Field & Company
- Alice Bolam Preston, illustrator
- Robert Seamans, aerospace engineer and ninth Secretary of the Air Force
- Benjamin Thomas, congressman and associate justice of the Massachusetts Supreme Judicial Court
- Bradford Torrey, ornithologist
- John Updike, novelist hailed as "one of the great American writers of the 20th century"
- Chris Van Allsburg, author

== See also ==
- Beverly, Massachusetts
- Beverly Hills, California
- Beverley, East Yorkshire
