= Alice Bolam Preston =

American artist and children's book illustrator

Alice Bolam Preston (1888–1958) was an American artist and children's book illustrator.

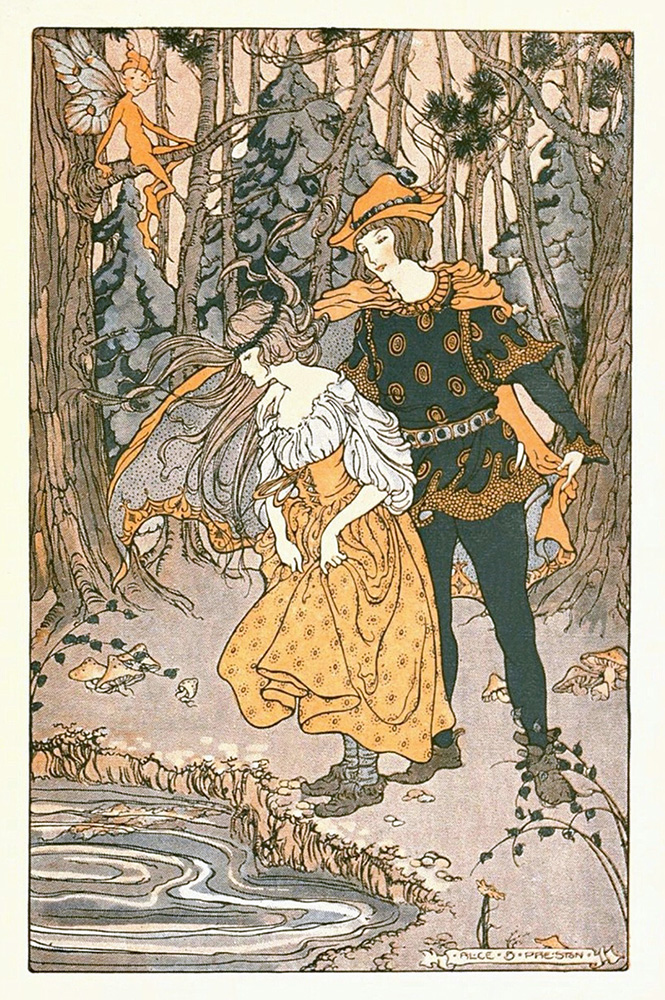
Frontispiece by Alice Bolam Preston for The Green Forest Fairy Book by Loretta Ellen Brady (1920).

== Biography ==
Preston lived in Beverly Farms, Massachusetts. She is best known for illustrating children's books in the 1910s and 1920s, primarily for Houghton Mifflin. She had a particular affinity for fairy illustrations. With crisp lines and rich colors, her work is stylistically akin to that of Jessie Willcox Smith or Charles Robinson.

Preston also created illustrations and covers for magazines such as Vogue and House Beautiful.

In 2014–2015, the Carle Museum of Picture Book Art in Massachusetts held a retrospective exhibition of her work.

== Books illustrated ==
- Sniffy, Snappy, and Velvet Pay by Ruth O. Dyer (1918)
- Stories from a Mouse Hole by Ruth O. Dyer (1919)
- Seven Peas in the Pod by Margery Bailey (1920)
- Adventures in Mother Goose Land by Edward Gower (1920)
- The Green Forest Fairy Book by Loretta Ellen Brady (1920)
- Peggy in Her Blue Frock by Eliza Orne White (1921)
- The Little Man with One Shoe by Margery Bailey (1921)
- Humpty Dumpty House by Ethel Calvert Phillips (1924)
- The Valley of Color Days by Helen B. Sandwell (1924)
- Tony by Eliza Orne White (1924)
- Whistle for Good Fortune by Margery Bailey (1940)
