= John I. Baker =

Deceased politician (Mayor)

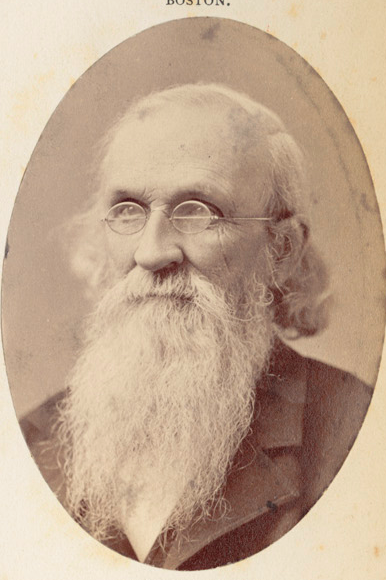
John Israel Baker

John Israel Baker (August 16, 1812 – February 17, 1897) was an American politician and historian from Beverly, Massachusetts.

== Career ==
Baker was the town clerk of Beverly, Massachusetts, from 1836 to 1856; the Essex County, Massachusetts, commissioner from 1847 to 1855; and a Massachusetts state senator from 1863 to 1864. Baker was the Prohibition Party's nominee in the 1876 Massachusetts gubernatorial election. On March 23, 1894, fellow residents of the town of Beverly voted at Town Meeting to move Beverly to a city form of government in 1895 and elect Baker its first mayor. Baker was nominated and ran unopposed. Baker served as mayor for one year (1895). William Morgan, the city editor for the Beverly Daily Evening Times, suggests the motivating reason for the change from a Board of Selectmen to a mayoral form of government was that the New England Town Meeting had outgrown its usefulness for the new city.

Baker co-founded the Beverly Historical Society on April 1, 1891.

Baker died in Beverly on February 17, 1897.

== Political views ==
Baker's major political concerns and positions were anti-slavery, pro-temperance, pro-women's suffrage, and anything that could improve Beverly. Baker was a Whig until 1854, a Republican from 1854 to 1869, and a Prohibitionist from 1870 forward.

=== Women's suffrage ===
Baker was an outspoken advocate of the right of women to participate in the political process in Massachusetts. In a September 12, 1876, address at the Women's-Suffrage State Convention of Massachusetts, the delegates issued a statement condemning Baker's political opposition, writing that "..neither the Republican nor Democratic party cares for the cause of women's-suffrage" and urging like minded allies to vote for Baker based on his pro-suffrage views. Baker was a member of the Prohibition party.

=== Divisionists ===
Baker was a firm advocate and supporter of the town of Beverly, Massachusetts. Noting that the neighborhood of Beverly Farms wished to divide (Massachusetts parlance for secession) from Beverly, Baker worked against division as a selectman for the town. Specifically, Beverly Farms residents stoked by wealthy summer visitors from Boston complained of high taxes, lengthy commutes between their village neighborhood and Beverly's downtown, poor representation, and the undesirable extension of public transportation into the village. The "divisionists" of Beverly Farms attempted to divide four times from the town of Beverly, trying each year from 1886 until 1890. In 1887, they passed the Massachusetts House and Senate but Oliver Ames, the governor of the Commonwealth, vetoed their appeal as a result of a very public bribery scandal affecting the Massachusetts Legislature's Committee on Towns.

In Swindell's 2021 analysis "The Crisis of the Commonwealth in Beverly's Civil War", Swindell argues that Division was a tax haven methodology employed by wealthy landowners where they would take up residence in a town with lower taxes to escape one with higher taxes (Boston). The local residents were beholden to the wealthier visitors for their livelihoods and thus agreed to argue for division. It was, Swindell argues, one of the best examples of money in politics.

== Personal ==
Baker was the father of Bessie Baker (deceased 1935) for whom Bessie Baker park in Beverly, Massachusetts, is named. He was the brother of American Silversmith Stephens Baker (1791–1883)
