= Benjamin Thomas (politician) =

American judge

Benjamin F. Thomas
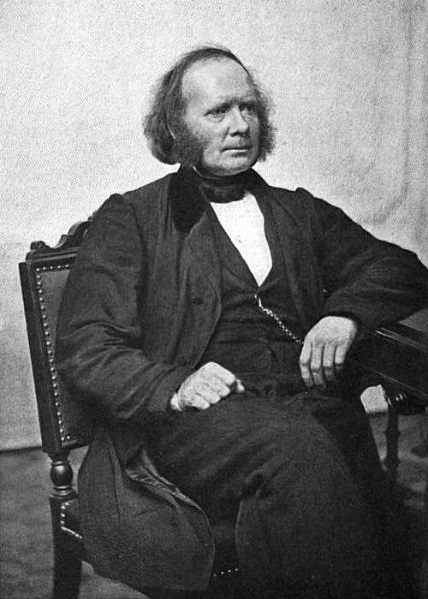

Member of the U.S. House of Representatives from Massachusetts's 3rd district
- In office June 11, 1861 – March 3, 1863
- Preceded by: Charles Francis Adams Sr.
- Succeeded by: Alexander H. Rice

Personal details
- Born: February 12, 1813 Boston, Massachusetts
- Died: September 27, 1878 (aged 65) Beverly Farms, Massachusetts
- Party: Union
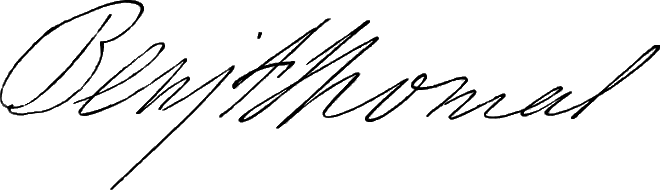
- Signature

Benjamin Franklin Thomas (February 12, 1813 – September 27, 1878) was a member of the United States House of Representatives from Massachusetts and an associate justice of the Massachusetts Supreme Judicial Court.

== Early years ==
Benjamin Thomas was born in Boston on February 12, 1813. In 1819, he moved with his parents to Worcester, Massachusetts, and attended Lancaster Academy. He was the grandson of publisher Isaiah Thomas. He graduated from Rhode Island's Brown University in 1830. Thomas studied law at Harvard Law School and with his cousin, Pliny Merrick of Worcester. He was admitted to the bar in 1833 and commenced practice in Worcester.

== Political career ==
Throughout his life, Thomas held several local offices. In 1842, he was elected to the Massachusetts House of Representatives. He was commissioner of bankruptcy in 1842, judge of probate for Worcester County 1844–1848, and a presidential elector on the Whig ticket in 1848. Thomas was a justice of the Massachusetts Supreme Judicial Court from 1853 to 1859. Thomas continued the practice of law in Boston. In 1861 he was elected as a Unionist to the 37th Congress to fill the vacancy caused by the resignation of Charles F. Adams, and served from June 11, 1861, to March 3, 1863. He served on the judiciary committee and the special committee on the bankrupt law. In 1868 he was nominated by the governor for chief justice of Massachusetts, but the nomination was not confirmed by the council. He was elected a member of the American Antiquarian Society in 1840, and would be deeply involved with the society in various ways for the rest of his life. He served on the society's board of councilors from 1842 to 1843, as secretary for domestic correspondence from 1841 to 1867, and as vice president from 1867 until his death in 1878. Thomas died at his home in Beverly Farms, Massachusetts on September 27, 1878, and is interred at Forest Hills Cemetery in Boston.

U.S. House of Representatives
Preceded by Charles Francis Adams, Sr.	Member of the U.S. House of Representatives from Massachusetts's 3rd congressional district June 11, 1861 – March 3, 1863	Succeeded by Alexander H. Rice
Legal offices
Preceded by Richard Fletcher	Associate Justice of the Massachusetts Supreme Judicial Court; 1839–1859	Succeeded by Ebenezer Rockwood Hoar
