= Charles R. Lyons =

American professor of drama and comparative literature (1933–1999)

- Born: 27 April 1933; Glendale, California
- Died: 11 May 1999 (aged 66); Palo Alto, California
- Occupation: Professor

Charles R. Lyons (27 April 1933 – 11 May 1999) was an American professor of drama and comparative literature at Stanford University and co-owner of the art gallery Lyons Ltd. He received his AB (1955), MA (1956), and PhD (1964) from Stanford as well. As an undergraduate at Stanford he focused on Shakespeare with the legendary professor Margery Bailey, the namesake of his endowed chair. He is best known as a theorist and teacher of theater. His interest in performance began in the 1950s as a professional actor in Los Angeles where he routinely performed at the Pasadena Playhouse. After finishing his masters, Lyons spent four years as a lieutenant in US Navy, where he served in the Far East and later in Washington, D.C., as a liaison to Jacques Cousteau.

In the early 1960s Lyons took a teaching position at Principia College in Illinois. In 1968 he moved on to the University of California, Berkeley becoming a professor of dramatic art and later the associate dean of letters and sciences. He returned to Stanford as chair of the theater department in 1973 and installed an undergraduate and doctoral program that established a new approach for the training of theater practitioners and theater scholars.

Lyons' scholarly writings included Shakespeare, Chekov, Ibsen, Brecht, Beckett, and Shepard. His former students currently occupy key positions in theater and performance departments across the US and in Europe, as well in repertory theaters, professional theater companies, and the film industry. Throughout his career, Lyons continued to work at the practice of theater, directing productions of John Gay's The Beggar's Opera, Samuel Beckett’s Endgame, William Shakespeare's Two Gentlemen of Verona and Hamlet with Andre Braugher in the title role.

Concerned with diversity issues within the arts, Lyons put forward a new Institute for Diversity in the Arts at Stanford, financed by the James Irvine Foundation.

== Awards ==
- Fulbright scholar
- National Endowment for the Humanities fellowship
- Guggenheim Fellowship

== Works ==
- Bertolt Brecht: The Despair and the Polemic. Southern Illinois University Press. 1968. OCLC 2616069.
- Shakespeare and the Ambiguity of Love's Triumph. Mouton. 1971. OCLC 210815.
- Samuel Beckett. Macmillan. 1983. ISBN 978-0-333-29465-9.
- Henrik Ibsen: The Divided Consciousness. Southern Illinois University Press. 1972. ISBN 978-0-809-30550-6.
- As editor: Critical Essays on Henrik Ibsen (Anthology). G.K. Hall. 1987. ISBN 978-0-8161-8835-2.
- Hedda Gabler: Gender, Role, and World. Twayne Publishers. 1990. ISBN 978-0-8057-9417-5.
