= Charles Francis Adams Sr. =

American polymath (1807–1886)

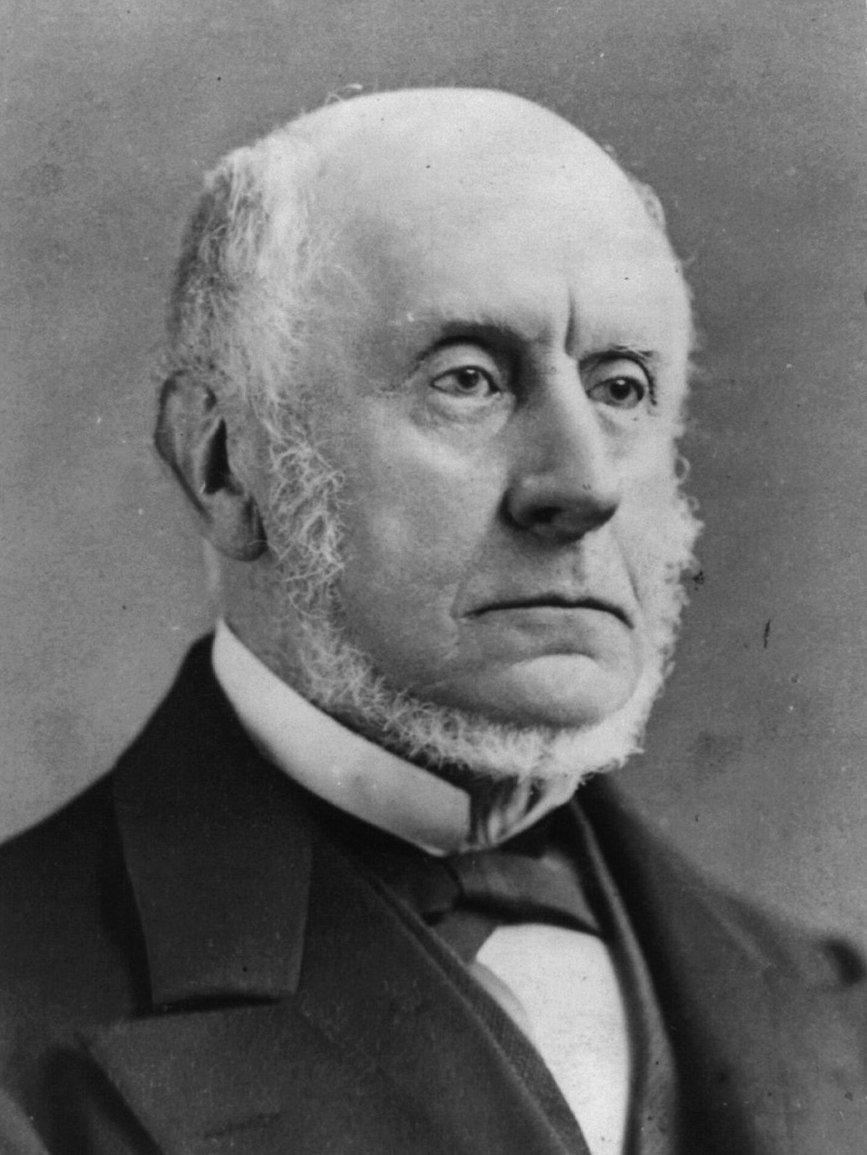
- Adams in 1861

22nd United States Minister to the United Kingdom
- In office May 16, 1861 – May 13, 1868
- President: Abraham Lincoln; Andrew Johnson
- Preceded by: George M. Dallas
- Succeeded by: Reverdy Johnson

Member of the U.S. House of Representatives from Massachusetts's 3rd district
- In office March 4, 1859 – May 1, 1861
- Preceded by: William S. Damrell
- Succeeded by: Benjamin Thomas

Member of the Massachusetts Senate
- In office 1843–1845

Member of the Massachusetts House of Representatives
- In office 1840–1843

Personal details
- Born: Charles Francis Adams; August 18, 1807 Boston, Massachusetts, U.S.
- Died: November 21, 1886 (aged 79) Boston, Massachusetts, U.S.
- Party: Whig (Before 1848); Free Soil (1848–1854); Republican (1854–1870); Liberal Republican (1870–1872); Anti-Masonic (1872–1876); Democratic (1876–1886)
- Spouse: Abigail Brown Brooks (m. 1829)
- Children: 7, including John, Charles Jr., Henry, and Brooks
- Parents: John Quincy Adams; Louisa Johnson
- Relatives: Adams political family
- Education: Harvard University (BA)

Charles Francis Adams Sr. (August 18, 1807 – November 21, 1886) was an American historical editor, writer, politician, and diplomat. As United States Minister to the United Kingdom during the American Civil War, Adams was crucial to Union efforts to prevent British recognition of the Confederate States of America and maintain European neutrality to the utmost extent. Adams also featured in national and state politics before and after the Civil War.

Adams was a member of one of the United States's most prominent political families: his father and grandfather were Presidents John Quincy Adams and John Adams respectively, about whom he wrote a major biography. He had seven children, including John Quincy II, Charles Jr., Henry, and Brooks.

Adams served two terms in the Massachusetts State Senate before helping to found the abolitionist Free Soil Party in 1848; he was the party's vice-presidential candidate in the election of 1848 on a ticket with former president Martin Van Buren. He was elected to the United States House of Representatives in 1858 and re-elected in 1860.

During the Civil War, Adams served as the United States Minister to the United Kingdom under Abraham Lincoln, where he played a key role in keeping the British government neutral and not diplomatically recognizing the Confederacy. After the War, he became alienated from the Republican Party and was successively a Liberal Republican, Anti-Mason, and Democrat. In 1876, he was the unsuccessful Democratic nominee for Governor of Massachusetts.

Adams became an overseer of Harvard University and built the Stone Library at Peacefield, the Adams's family home which is now part of the Adams National Historical Park in Quincy, Massachusetts, to honor his father.

== Early life ==
Adams was born in Boston on August 18, 1807, and he was one of three sons and a daughter born to John Quincy Adams (1767–1848) and Louisa Catherine Johnson (1775–1852). His older brothers were George Washington Adams (1801–1829) and John Adams II (1803–1834). His sister, Louisa, was born in 1811 but died in 1812 while the family was in Russia. He was named in part after Francis Dana. On July 4, 1826, Adams’ grandfather died of heart failure at the age of 90.

He attended Boston Latin School and Harvard College, where he graduated in 1825. He then studied law with Daniel Webster, attained admission to the bar, and practiced in Boston. He wrote numerous reviews of works about American and British history for the North American Review.

During the presidency of his father John Quincy Adams (1825–1829), Charles and his brothers John and George were all rivals for the same woman, their cousin Mary Catherine Hellen, who lived with the Adams family after the death of her parents. In 1828, John married Mary in a White House ceremony, and both Charles and George declined to attend.

== Career ==
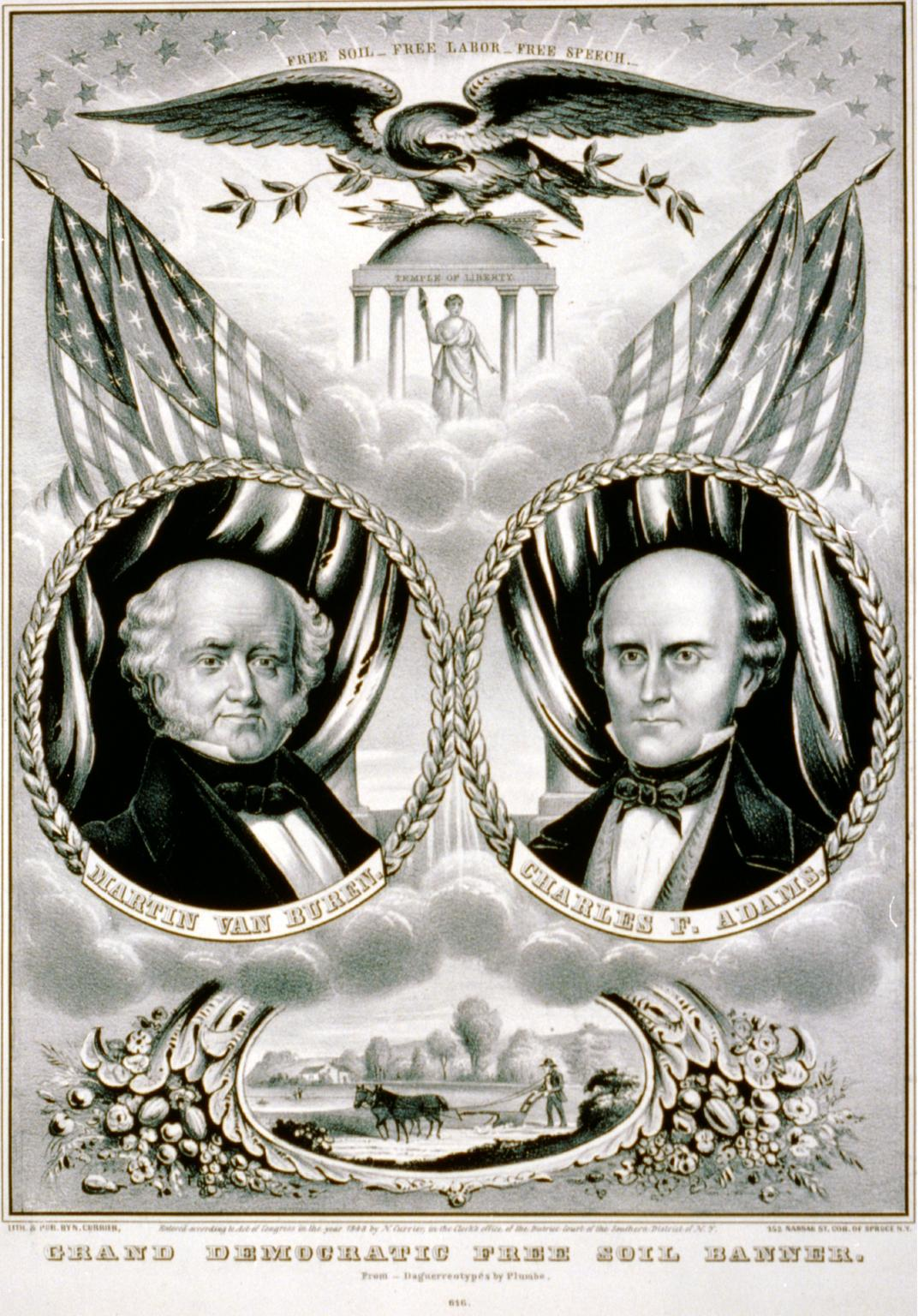
Van Buren/Adams campaign poster

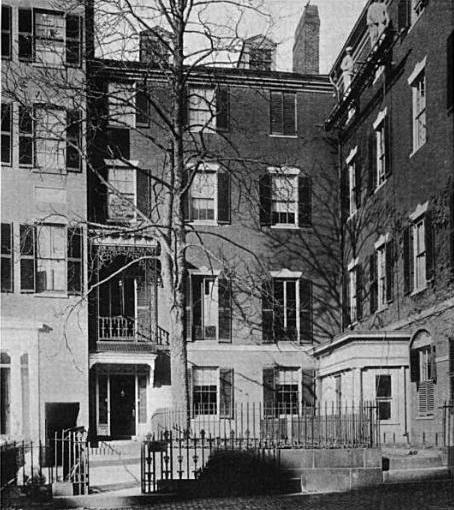
Adams lived on Mount Vernon Street, Beacon Hill, Boston, 1842–1886.

In 1840, Adams was elected to the first of three one-year terms in the Massachusetts House of Representatives and he served in the Massachusetts Senate from 1843 to 1845. In 1846, he purchased and became editor of the Boston Whig newspaper. In 1848, he was the unsuccessful nominee of the Free Soil Party for Vice President of the United States, running on a ticket with former president Martin Van Buren as the presidential nominee. That same year, on February 21, his father had suffered a massive stroke and collapsed on the floor of the House. He died two days later in the Speaker's Room in the Capitol building at the age of 80.

From the 1840s, Adams became one of the finest historical editors of his era. He developed his expertise in part because of the example of his father, who in 1829 had turned from politics (after his defeated bid for a second presidential term in 1828) to history and biography. John Quincy Adams began a biography of his father, John Adams, but wrote only a few chapters before resuming his political career in 1830 with his election to the U.S. House of Representatives.

The younger Adams, fresh from his edition of the letters of his grandmother Abigail Adams, Letters of Mrs. Adams, the Wife of John Adams (1840), took up the project that his father had left uncompleted and between 1850 and 1856 turned out not just the two volumes of the biography but eight further volumes presenting editions of John Adams's Diary and Autobiography, his major political writings, and a selection of letters and speeches. The edition, titled The Works of John Adams, Esq., Second President of the United States, was the only edition of John Adams's writings until the family donated the cache of Adams papers to the Massachusetts Historical Society in 1854 and authorized the creation of the Adams Papers project; the modern project had published accurate scholarly editions of John Adams's diary and autobiography, several volumes of Adams family correspondence, two volumes on the portraits of John and Abigail Adams and John Quincy and Louisa Catherine Adams, and the early years of the diary of Charles Francis Adams, who published a revised edition of the biography in 1871. He was elected a Fellow of the American Academy of Arts and Sciences in 1857.

=== Meeting with Joseph Smith ===
In 1844, while traveling with his cousin Josiah Quincy Jr., Charles Francis Adams Sr. met Joseph Smith, the founder of the Church of Jesus Christ and the Latter Day Saints, in Nauvoo, Illinois, and received a copy of the Book of Mormon which had previously belonged to Smith's first wife, Emma Smith. The book is now in the archive collections of Adams National Historical Park. At the visit, Smith showed Adams and Quincy four Egyptian mummies and ancient papyri. Adams was not impressed by Smith, and wrote in his diary entry that day, "Such a man is a study not for himself, but as serving to show what turns the human mind will sometimes take. And herafter if I should live, I may compare the results of this delusion with the condition in which I saw it and its mountebank apostle."

Adams' companion and cousin, Josiah Quincy, also reflected on Joseph Smith's influence, writing:

"It is by no means improbable that some future textbook... will contain a question something like this: What historical American of the nineteenth century has exerted the most powerful influence upon the destinies of his countrymen? And it is by no means impossible that the answer to that interrogatory may be thus written: Joseph Smith, the Mormon prophet." Quincy, Figures of the Past 376.

=== Congressman and diplomat ===
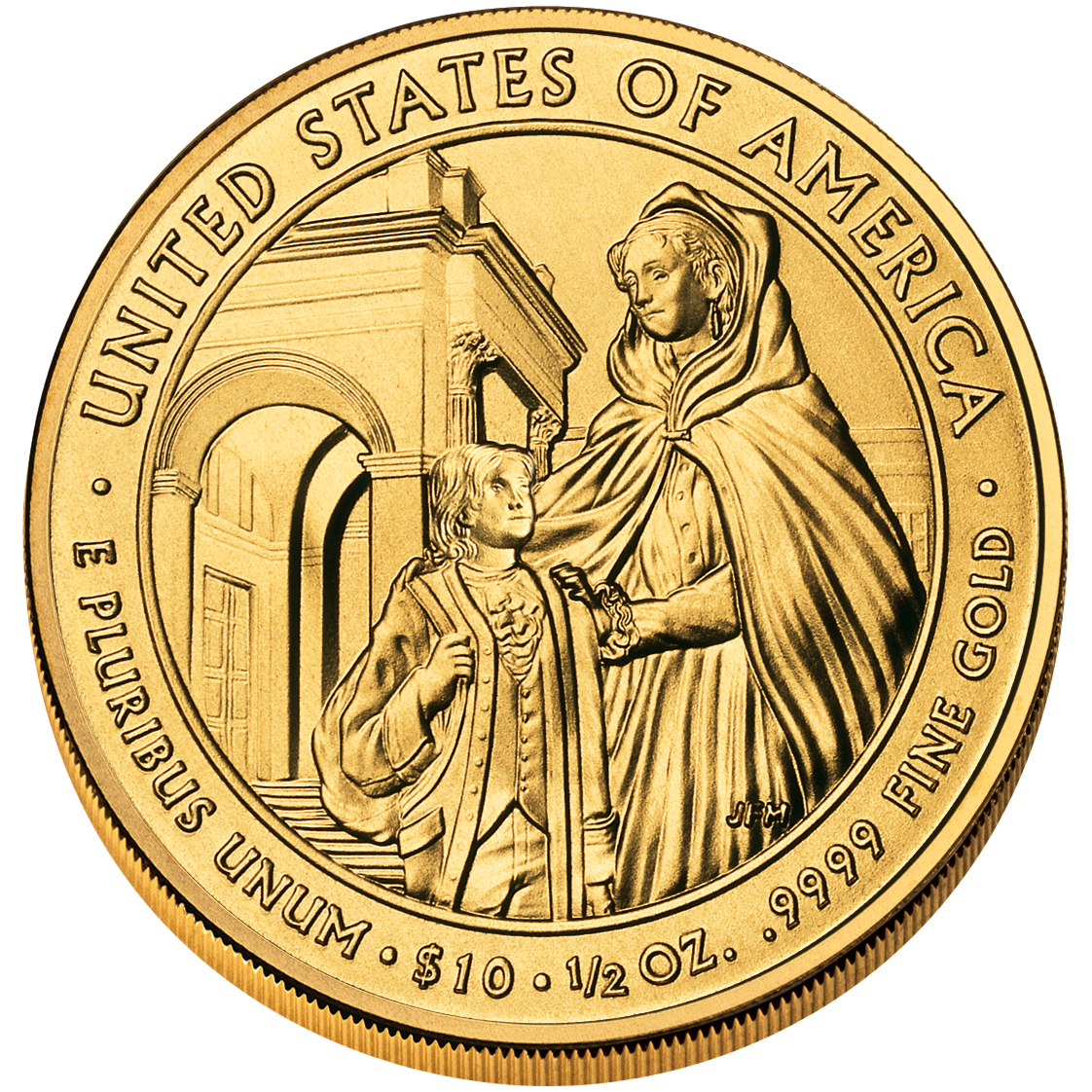
Adams and his mother Louisa on the reverse of the 2008 First Spouse coin of the presidential dollar coin series

As a Republican, Adams was elected to the United States House of Representatives in 1858, where he chaired the Committee on Manufactures. He was re-elected in 1860 but resigned to become U.S. minister (ambassador) to the Court of St James's (Britain), a post previously held by his father and grandfather, from 1861 to 1868. Powerful Massachusetts senator Charles Sumner had wanted the position and so became alienated from Adams. Britain had already recognized Confederate belligerency, but Adams was instrumental in maintaining British neutrality and preventing British diplomatic recognition of the Confederacy during the American Civil War.

Part of his duties included corresponding with British civilians, including Karl Marx and the International Workingmen's Association. Adams and his son, Henry Brooks Adams, who served as his private secretary, also were kept busy monitoring Confederate diplomatic intrigues and the construction of rebel commerce raiders (like hull N°290, launched as Enrica from Liverpool but was soon transformed near the Azores Islands into sloop-of-war CSS Alabama) and blockade runners by British shipyards.

His main success as a diplomat was in keeping Britain neutral. He helped resolve the Trent Affair in 1861, in which an American naval officer had violated British rights. With the Union blockade of Confederate ports growing increasingly successful, little cotton now reached Europe except through Union channels. A strong element in Britain, including Chancellor of the Exchequer William Ewart Gladstone, wanted to intervene to help the Confederacy. Adams warned doing so would mean war with the United States, as well as the cutting off of American food exports, which constituted about a fourth of the British food supply. The American Navy, increasingly strong, would try to sink British shipping.

The British government pulled back from talk of war when the Confederate invasion of the North was defeated at Antietam, and Lincoln announced that he would issue the Emancipation Proclamation. Adams and his staff collected details on the shipbuilding issue, showing how warships and blockade runners built for the Confederacy caused widespread damage to American interests, the former being against the U.S. Merchant Marine and the latter against the Union Army on the battlefield. The evidence became the basis of the postwar Alabama Claims. The claims went to arbitration, with Adams in charge of the American side. However, the British in 1872 agreed to pay $15 million (~$349 million in 2024) in damages only for damages caused by British-built Confederate warships.

== Later life ==
Back in Boston, Adams declined the presidency of Harvard University, but became one of its overseers in 1869. In 1870 he built the first presidential library in the United States to honor his father John Quincy Adams. The Stone Library includes over 14,000 books written in twelve languages. The library is at Peacefield (also known as the "Old House") which is now part of Adams National Historical Park in Quincy, Massachusetts.

In 1876, Adams ran unsuccessfully for Governor of Massachusetts.

During the 1876 Electoral College controversy, Adams sided with Democrat Samuel J. Tilden over Republican Rutherford B. Hayes for the White House.

== Personal life ==
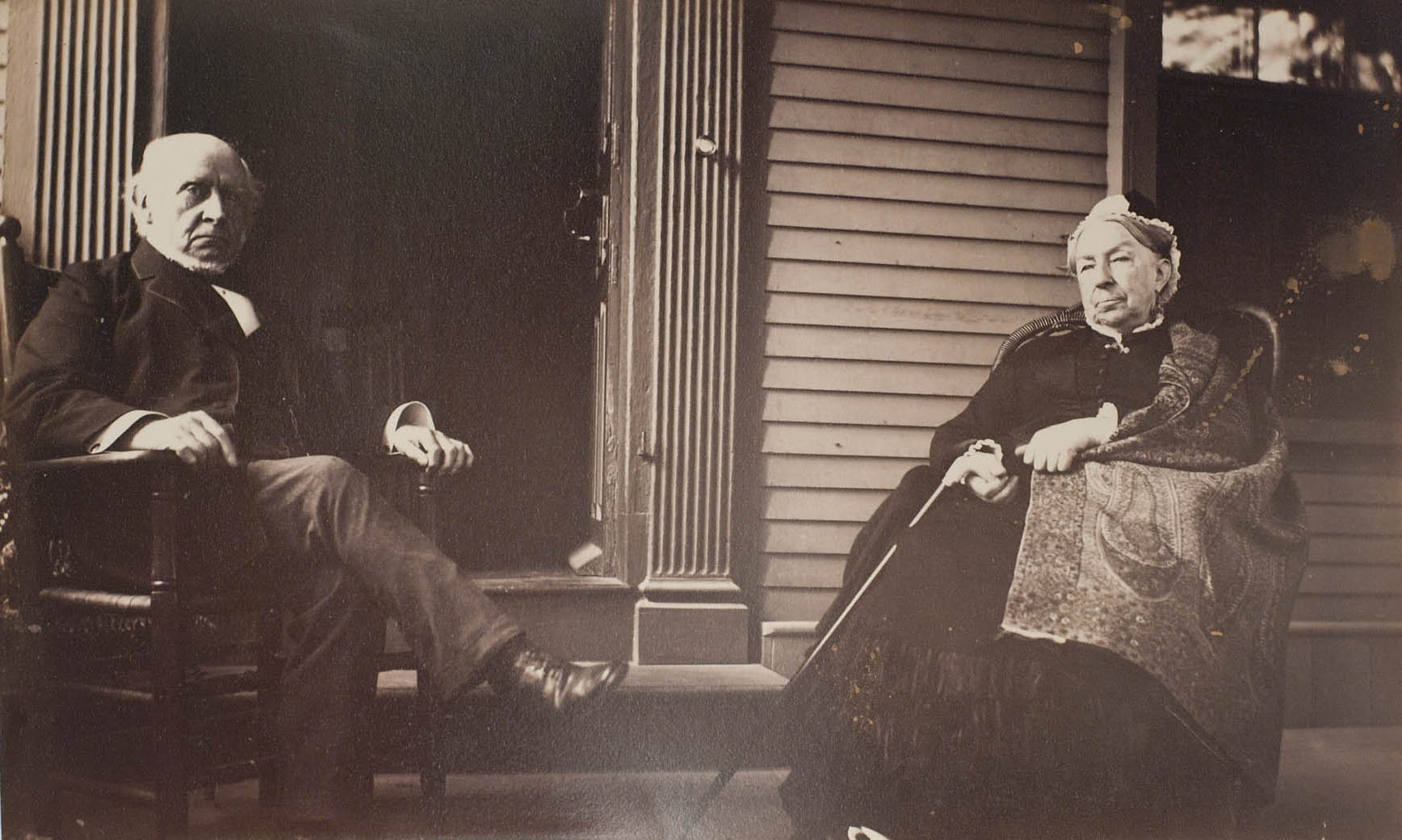
Mr. and Mrs. Adams on the porch at Peacefield in Quincy, photographed by Marian Hooper Adams

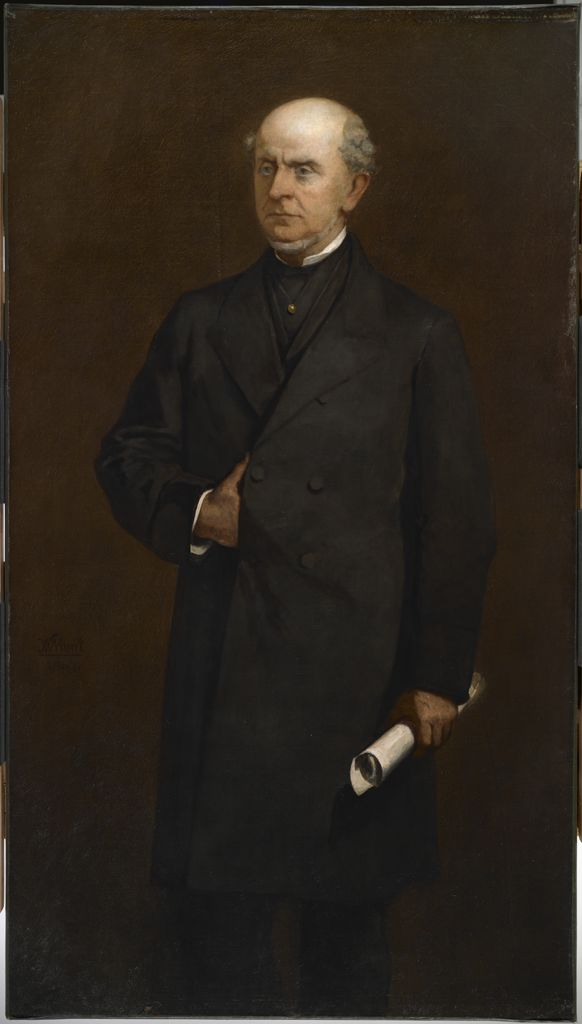
Portrait of Adams in 1867 by William Morris Hunt

On September 3, 1829, he married Abigail Brown Brooks (1808–1889), whose father was shipping magnate Peter Chardon Brooks (1767–1849). She had two sisters, Charlotte, who was married to Edward Everett, a Massachusetts politician, and Ann, who was married to Nathaniel Frothingham, a Unitarian minister. Together, they were the parents of:

- Louisa Catherine Adams (1831–1870), who married Charles Kuhn (1821–1899)
- John Quincy Adams II (1833–1894)
- Charles Francis Adams Jr. (1835–1915)
- Henry Brooks Adams (1838–1918)
- Arthur George Adams (1841–1846), who died young
- Mary Gardiner Adams (1845–1928), who married Dr. Henry Parker Quincy (1838–1899)
- Peter Chardon Brooks Adams (1848–1927)

Adams died in Boston on November 21, 1886, at the age of 79, and was interred in Mount Wollaston Cemetery, Quincy. He was the last surviving child of John Quincy Adams.

His wife Abigail's "health and spirits" worsened after her husband's death, and she died at Peacefield on June 6, 1889.

Party political offices
New political party	Free Soil nominee for Vice President of the United States; 1848	Succeeded by George Washington Julian
Party reestablished	Anti-Masonic nominee for President of the United States; 1872	Vacant Title next held by John W. Phelps; 1880
Preceded by William Gaston	Democratic nominee for Governor of Massachusetts; 1876	Succeeded by William Gaston
U.S. House of Representatives
Preceded by William S. Damrell	Member of the U.S. House of Representatives from Massachusetts's 3rd congressional district 1859–1861	Succeeded by Benjamin Thomas
Diplomatic posts
Preceded by George M. Dallas	United States Envoy to the United Kingdom; 1861–1868	Succeeded by Reverdy Johnson
