= Margery Bailey =

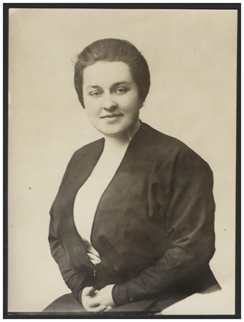
Margery Bailey

Margery Bailey (May 12, 1891 - June 17, 1963) was a professor of English and Dramatic Arts and Literature at Stanford University. She is regarded as "one of Stanford’s most celebrated teachers in the 1930s, 40s, and 50s."

== Early life and education ==
Margery Bailey was born on May 12, 1891, in Santa Cruz, California, the daughter of John Howard Bailey and Margaret Elizabeth Jones.

She attended Stanford University, receiving a bachelor's degree in 1914 and a and master's in English in 1916. In 1920, she earned a Ph.D. from Yale University.

== Career ==
From 1916 to 1963, Bailey was first instructor and then professor of English Literature at Stanford University. In 1937, she was the first women to achieve tenure as a Stanford professor. Despite her advanced degrees, she was not promoted to full professor until 1953. Her students included John Steinbeck, Laird Doyle, Waldo Salt, Archie Binns, Anita M. Caspary, IHM and Angus Bowmer, who later founded the Oregon Shakespeare Festival. Twice she persuaded Steinbeck to return to his studies at Stanford, and she is regarded as one of the two influential people in his formative years (the other being Stanford professor Edith R. Mirrielees). Charles R. Lyons (1933–1999), later professor of drama and comparative literature at Stanford University, studied under Bailey as an undergraduate at Stanford, and later was given the professorship that bears Bailey's name. Bailey's difficult personality and her flair for the dramatic were famous at Stanford.

She was active in Stanford dramatics and in the Oregon Shakespeare Festival at Ashland, Oregon, founded by her former student Angus Bowmer; she worked there both as an actress and director. Her collection of rare books about Shakespeare, donated to Southern Oregon University, has grown to more than 7200 volumes. In 1957 she published Ashland Studies in Shakespeare.

Middle of the 1930s, she established the Stanford University Dramatists’ Alliance and founded a Shakespearian Festival in the San Francisco Bay Area.

She wrote three books illustrated by Alice Bolam Preston: Seven Peas in the Pod (1920), The Little Man with One Shoe (1921) and Whistle for Good Fortune (1940).

In 1928, she edited The Hypochondriac: Being the Seventy Essays by the Celebrated Biographer James Boswell, Appearing in the London Magazine from November, 1777, to August, 1783, and Here First Reprinted (her Ph.D. thesis at Yale) and in 1951 she wrote the introduction for Boswell's Column. Being his Seventy Contributions to The London Magazine under the pseudonym The Hypochondriack from 1777 to 1783 here First Printed in Book Form in England, both books by James Boswell.

She corresponded with John P. Marquand, Clarence Darrow, Gertrude Stein, Robinson Jeffers, Irvin S. Cobb, Harold Bell Wright, Helen Keller and Gregory Peck.

== Personal life ==
From 1939 to 1963 she lived at 559 Kingsley Avenue, Palo Alto, California, with her companion, Dr. Margaret Lamson. The house is now an historical landmark. Lamson was the sister of Stanford executive David Lamson who was accused of killing his wife, Allene, in 1933. He was sentenced to be hanged at San Quentin, but a team of Stanford colleagues, including his sister Margaret, stepped in to form the Lamson Defense Committee. The group included poets Yvor Winters and Janet Lewis and criminologist E.O. Heinrich. They managed to overturn the verdict.

== Death and legacy ==
Margery Bailey died on June 17, 1963, at age 72.

Stanford University endows the Margery Bailey Professorship in English.

The Bailey Lounge, located in the Liliore Green Rains Houses, a graduate housing complex at Stanford, is named after her.

The Margery Bailey Renaissance Collection at Southern Oregon University's Hannon Library.
