= West Beach, Beverly, Massachusetts =

Beach in Massachusetts, United States

Coordinates: 42°33′42″N 70°48′18″W

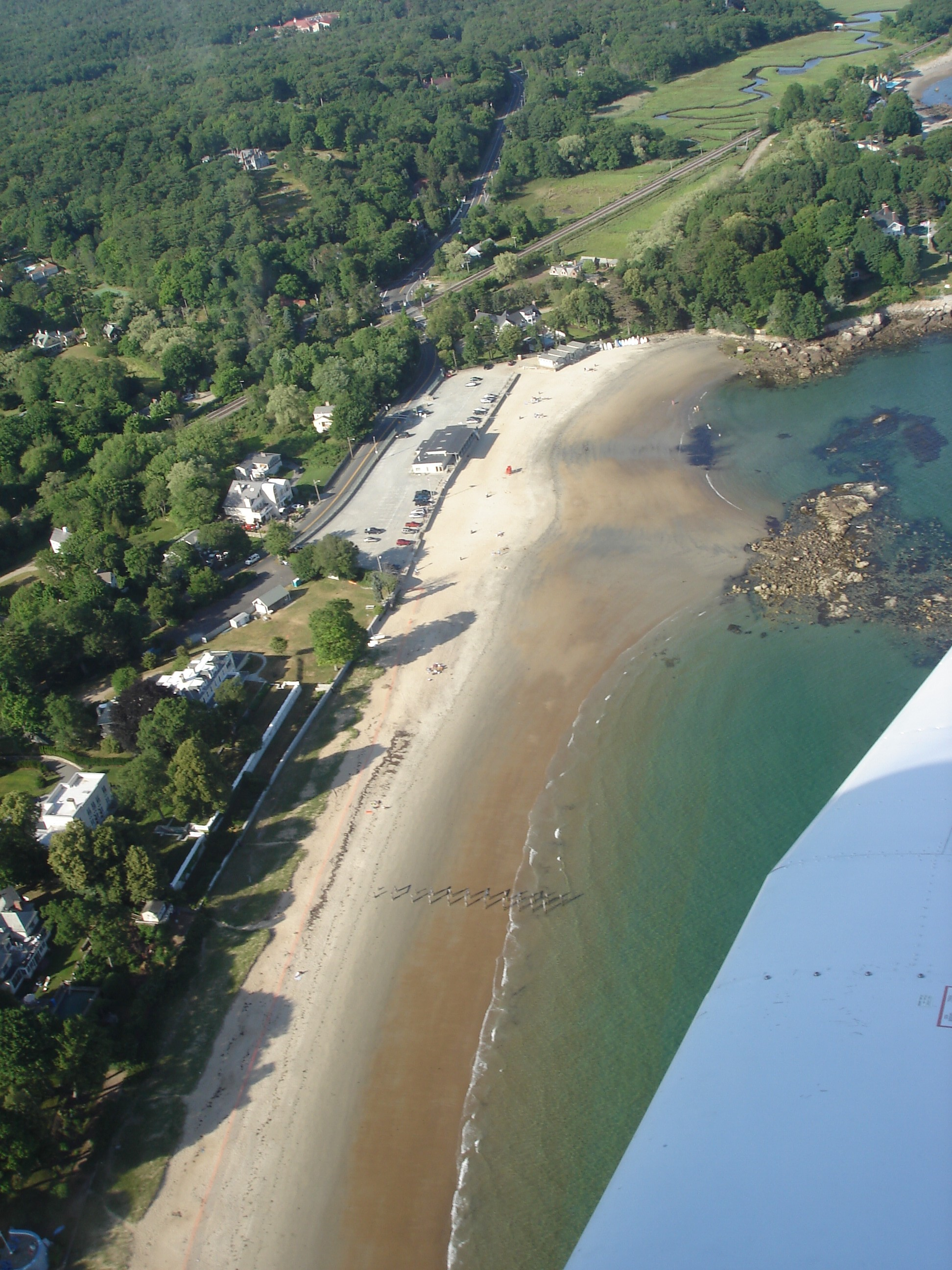
West Beach, July 2007

West Beach is a 1.13-mile (1.82 km)-long beach on the North Shore of Massachusetts located in the City of Beverly, Massachusetts. It is located along West Street, in Beverly Farms. The beach is part of a strip of sandy coastline about one mile long, extending from a rocky enclave at Lees crossing Westerly to the Prides Crossing area of Beverly. There is a beach parking area that is owned by the residents of Beverly Farms. The residents of Beverly Farms has ownership for about 1/4 of the length of this stretch. The Beach is open year round. During the nine-month off-season, the membership requirements are not enforced.

== Oversight ==
The beach is managed by a group local community volunteers elected by the organizations membership yearly. The Beach does not restrict access during the off season. It becomes private, requiring a pass to enter and a sticker to park in the summer months. Passes and stickers can be purchased by residents of Beverly Farms and Prides crossing, thus becoming members of the corporation. People from beyond the bounds of Beverly Farms and Prides Crossing can submit a request for a subscribers pass and sticker allowing access to the beach. There is a limited amount of parking available at the site, there has historically been a waiting list for subscriber parking stickers.

== History ==
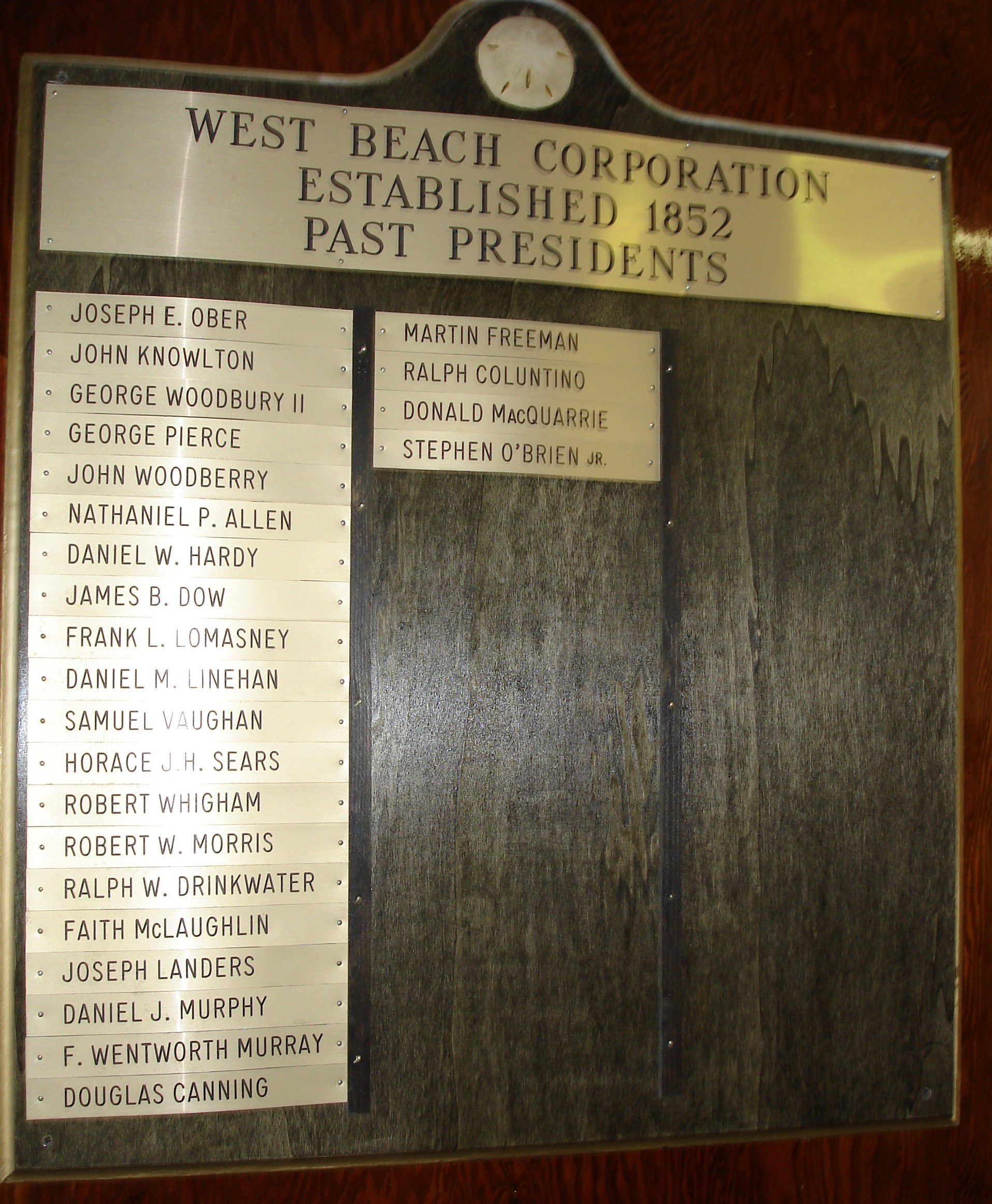
Past presidents, 1852–2009

West Beach's governing organization has been incorporated since April 21, 1852 by the Massachusetts State House of Representatives. The beach and surrounding land was originally deeded to John West in 1666. Mr. West bequeathed the land to the residents of Beverly Farms and Prides Crossing. Section 3 of the West Beach Corporation by-laws describes the intended use of the beach for: "The members of said corporation may use and occupy said described portions of sea shore, beach and flats for the purpose of gathering drift-stuff and sea weed, and of boating and bathing, as the said premises have heretofore been used and occupied by them and predecessors; and also providing facilities for the enjoyment and beautification of the beach and shore by members; by providing swimming classes for members and their guests; to give courses in safety in the water and small boat handling...." West Beach has a historic past. It is the site for the annual Farms-Prides Fourth of July fireworks display that has occurred for over 100 years. Noted Author, John Updike, who resided locally was a frequent visitor. Nineteenth-century author Nathaniel Hawthorne from the nearby city of Salem, Massachusetts visited West Beach as noted by his son. Artist Fitz Henry Lane painted a landscape of the beach in the mid-19th century that sold for $3.85 million at an art auction in 1997.
