= East Tilton, New Hampshire =

Village in Tilton, New Hampshire

East Tilton is a village in Tilton, New Hampshire, United States. It is located near the village of Winnisquam. Its exact coordinates are at 43.47980° N, 71.54035° W. Nearby settlements include Belmont, Sanbornton, and Northfield. The village is centered between Silver Lake and Lake Winnisquam on Laconia Road, near the Lochmere Dam.
