= Lochmere Archeological District =

Historic district in New Hampshire, United States

- U.S. National Register of Historic Places
- U.S. Historic district
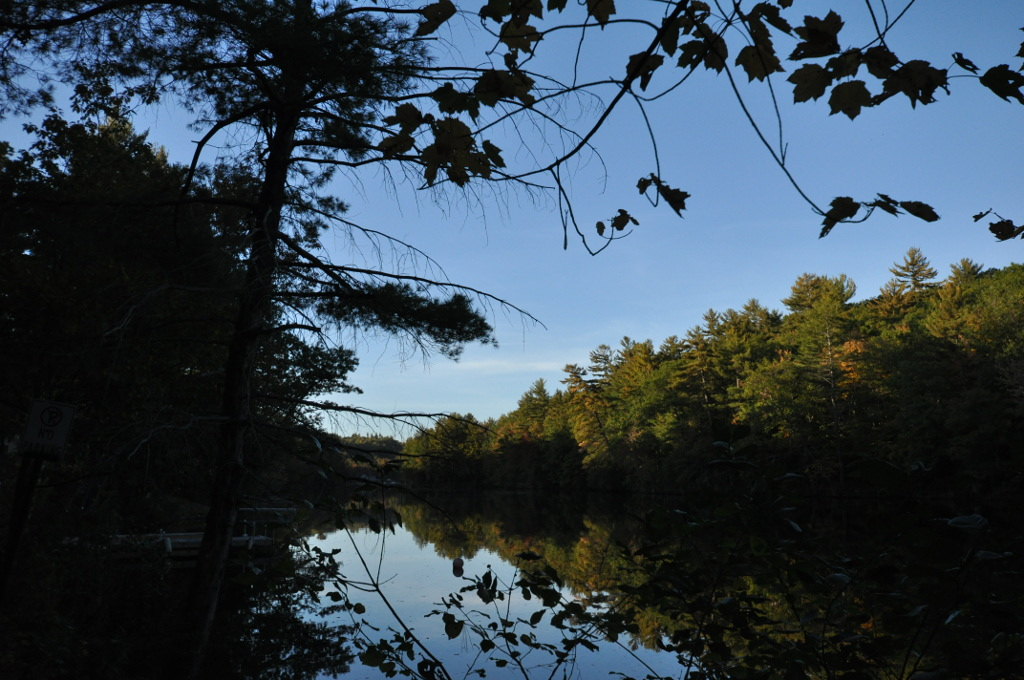
- The Winnipesaukee River, between Lake Winnisquam and Silver Lake
- Nearest city: Tilton, New Hampshire
- Area: 90 acres (36 ha)
- NRHP reference No.: 82000615
- Added to NRHP: November 1, 1982

The Lochmere Archeological District is a large archeological area on the banks of the Winnipesaukee River in Belknap County, New Hampshire, near the village of Lochmere. The area, part of which is now preserved by the state as the Brennick Lochmere Archaeological Site, is a multi-component site with evidence of human occupation from the Middle Archaic through the Late Woodland periods. The site was occupied in historic times by the Winnipesaukee sub-tribe of the Pennacook people, and is near Aquadoctan (aka The Weirs), one of the largest native towns of prehistoric New Hampshire.

The district also encompasses a number of archaeologically sensitive historic sites that were developed by white settlers and later residents to take advantage of the river's water power for industrial purposes. These uses began as early as the 1770s and continued into the 19th century, when the proprietors of the area's mills contested with the wealthier owners of downstream mills in Manchester, New Hampshire, Lowell, Massachusetts, and other sites on the Merrimack River for control over the river's flow. These well-funded interests eventually purchased all of the major water rights in the area, and shut the smaller area mills down, and by 1882 most of them lay in ruins.

About 90 acres (36 ha) of the area was listed on the National Register of Historic Places in 1982, an area that includes 13 prehistoric and 18 historic sites. Some of the archaeologically sensitive areas have been partially compromised by home construction in the area, and by the state in the dredging and widening the river channel.

== See also ==
- National Register of Historic Places listings in Belknap County, New Hampshire
- New Hampshire Historical Marker No. 149: Lochmere Archeological District
