= Winnisquam =

Winnisquam may refer to a location in New Hampshire, the United States:

- Lake Winnisquam
- Winnisquam, New Hampshire, a village named after the lake
- Winnisquam Regional High School, in Tilton, New Hampshire
