= The Plains, New Hampshire =

Neighborhood in the town of Tilton, New Hampshire

The Plains is a neighborhood in the town of Tilton, New Hampshire, United States. It is situated along U.S. Route 3 (Laconia Road]], west of Silver Lake. Route 3 leads southwest 2.5 miles (4.0 km) to the center of Tilton and northeast 6 miles (10 km) to Laconia. Directly north of The Plains is the Lochmere Golf and Country Club, named after the Lochmere neighborhood it stands near. The Plains is located shortly south of Noyes Road, next to a U-Haul location and a marsh on the side of the road.
