= William W. Joscelyn =

American politician

Member of the New Hampshire House of Representatives from the Belknap 2nd district
- In office 1990–1992

Personal details
- Born: William Wilkie Joscelyn; July 1, 1926 Tilton, New Hampshire, U.S.
- Died: December 1, 2015 (aged 89) Tilton, New Hampshire, U.S.
- Party: Democratic

William Wilkie Joscelyn (July 1, 1926 – December 1, 2015) was an American politician. A member of the Democratic Party, he served in the New Hampshire House of Representatives from 1990 to 1992.

== Life and career ==
Joscelyn was born in Tilton, New Hampshire, the son of Edward Joscelyn and Ida Mae Mills. He attended and graduated from Tilton-Northfield High School. After graduating, he worked as a postal carrier.

Joscelyn served in the New Hampshire House of Representatives from 1990 to 1992.

== Death ==
Joscelyn died on December 1, 2015, at his home in Tilton, New Hampshire, at the age of 89.
