= Tilton Northfield, New Hampshire =

Census-designated place in New Hampshire, United States

- Census-designated place
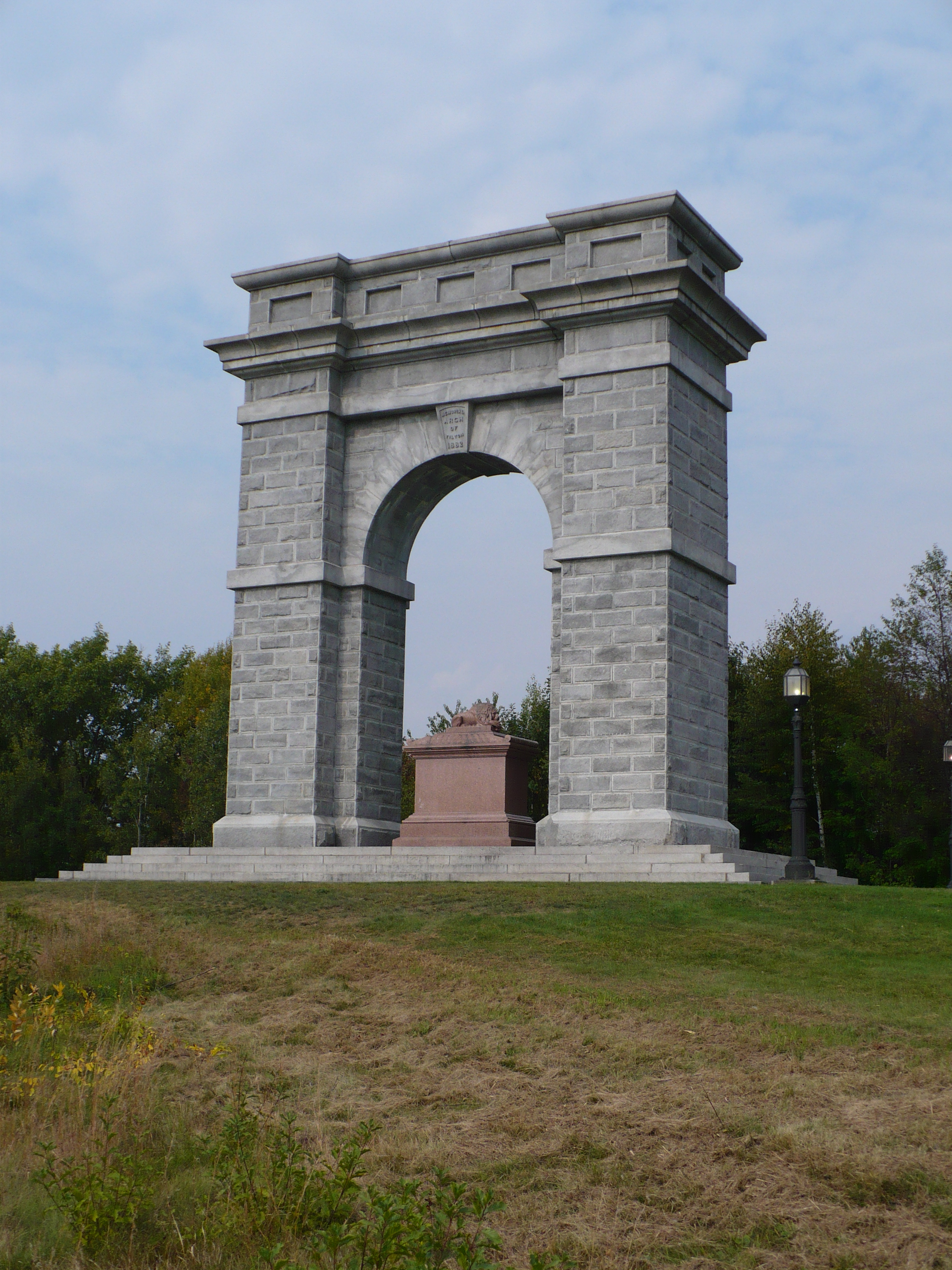
- Memorial Arch of Tilton 1882, located in Northfield

- Location in Merrimack County and the state of New Hampshire
- Coordinates: 43°26′40″N 71°35′33″W
- Country: United States
- State: New Hampshire
- Counties: Belknap, Merrimack
- Towns: Tilton, Northfield

Area
  - Total: 3.24 sq mi (8.40 km^{2})
  - Land: 3.14 sq mi (8.12 km^{2})
  - Water: 0.11 sq mi (0.29 km^{2})
- Elevation: 446 ft (136 m)

Population (2020)
  - Total: 3,324
  - Density: 1,061/sq mi (409.5/km^{2})
- Time zone: UTC-5 (Eastern (EST))
  - Summer (DST): UTC-4 (EDT)
- ZIP code: 03276
- Area code: 603
- FIPS code: 33-77100
- GNIS feature ID: 2378093

Tilton Northfield is a census-designated place (CDP) representing two adjacent villages in the towns of Tilton in Belknap County and Northfield in Merrimack County in the U.S. state of New Hampshire. The CDP encompasses the town centers of both Tilton and Northfield, located on either side of the Winnipesaukee River. The population was 3,324 at the 2020 census.

== Geography ==
The CDP is located in Tilton, it extends from the Franklin city line in the west to Interstate 93 in the east, and north to Clark Road, Colby Road, and just south of Aster Drive. The Northfield part of the CDP is bordered by I-93 to the east; the Winnipesaukee River, Williams Brook and Zion Hill Road to the west; and Forrest Road to the south.

According to the United States Census Bureau, the CDP has a total area of 3.2 square miles (8.4 km^{2}), of which 3.1 square miles (8.1 km^{2}) are land and 0.12 square miles (0.3 km^{2}), or 3.39%, are water. The Winnipesaukee River flows through the center of the CDP, separating the villages of Northfield and Tilton, and running west to the Merrimack River in Franklin.

== Demographics ==
Historical population
Census	Pop.	Note	%±
1970	2,420		—
1980	2,574		6.4%
1990	3,081		19.7%
2000	3,231		4.9%
2010	3,075		−4.8%
2020	3,324		8.1%
U.S. Decennial Census

=== 2020 census ===
As of the 2020 census, Tilton Northfield CDP had a population of 3,324. The median age was 40.9 years. 20.6% of residents were under the age of 18 and 20.1% were 65 years of age or older. For every 100 females, there were 105.4 males, and for every 100 females age 18 and over, there were 103.2 males age 18 and over.

88.1% of residents lived in urban areas, while 11.9% lived in rural areas.

There were 1,349 households in Tilton Northfield, of which 26.5% had children under the age of 18 living in them. Of all households, 38.6% were married-couple households, 19.9% were households with a male householder and no spouse or partner present, and 29.5% were households with a female householder and no spouse or partner present. About 31.8% of all households were made up of individuals, and 11.9% had someone living alone who was 65 years of age or older.

There were 1,435 housing units, of which 6.0% were vacant. The homeowner vacancy rate was 3.0% and the rental vacancy rate was 3.1%.

Racial composition as of the 2020 census
Race	Number	Percent
White	3,033	91.2%
Black or African American	16	0.5%
American Indian and Alaska Native	10	0.3%
Asian	64	1.9%
Native Hawaiian and Other Pacific Islander	0	0.0%
Some other race	30	0.9%
Two or more races	171	5.1%
Hispanic or Latino (of any race)	81	2.4%

=== 2010 census ===
As of the census of 2010, the Tilton Northfield CDP had a population of 3,075, of whom 1,619 lived in the Tilton portion and 1,456 lived in the Northfield portion. A total of 1,212 households and 721 families resided in the CDP. There were 1,335 housing units, of which 123, or 9.2%, were vacant. The racial makeup of the CDP was 96.1% white, 0.7% African American, 0.4% Native American, 1.4% Asian, 0.0% Pacific Islander, 0.2% some other race, and 1.3% from two or more races. 1.0% of the population were Hispanic or Latino of any race.

Of the 1,212 households in the CDP, 30.0% had children under the age of 18 living with them, 39.3% were headed by married couples living together, 14.9% had a female householder with no husband present, and 40.5% were non-families. 31.4% of all households were made up of individuals, and 10.6% were someone living alone who was 65 years of age or older. The average household size was 2.34, and the average family size was 2.93.

20.9% of residents in the CDP were under the age of 18, 8.7% were from age 18 to 24, 26.7% were from 25 to 44, 27.2% were from 45 to 64, and 16.5% were 65 years of age or older. The median age was 40.4 years. For every 100 females, there were 107.8 males. For every 100 females age 18 and over, there were 107.6 males.

=== Income and poverty ===
For the period 2011–15, the estimated median annual income for a household was $52,712, and the median income for a family was $65,556. Male full-time workers had a median income of $39,978 versus $34,118 for females. The per capita income for the CDP was $23,615. 8.8% of the population and 6.0% of families were below the poverty line, along with 15.4% of people under the age of 18 and 3.3% of people 65 or older.
