= Winnepesaukee =

Winnepesaukee can refer to:

- the Winnipesaukee Indians, a subtribe of the Pennacook people
- Lake Winnipesaukee, the largest lake in the U.S. state of New Hampshire
- the Winnipesaukee River
