= Opechee Bay =

Lake in Belknap County, New Hampshire, United States

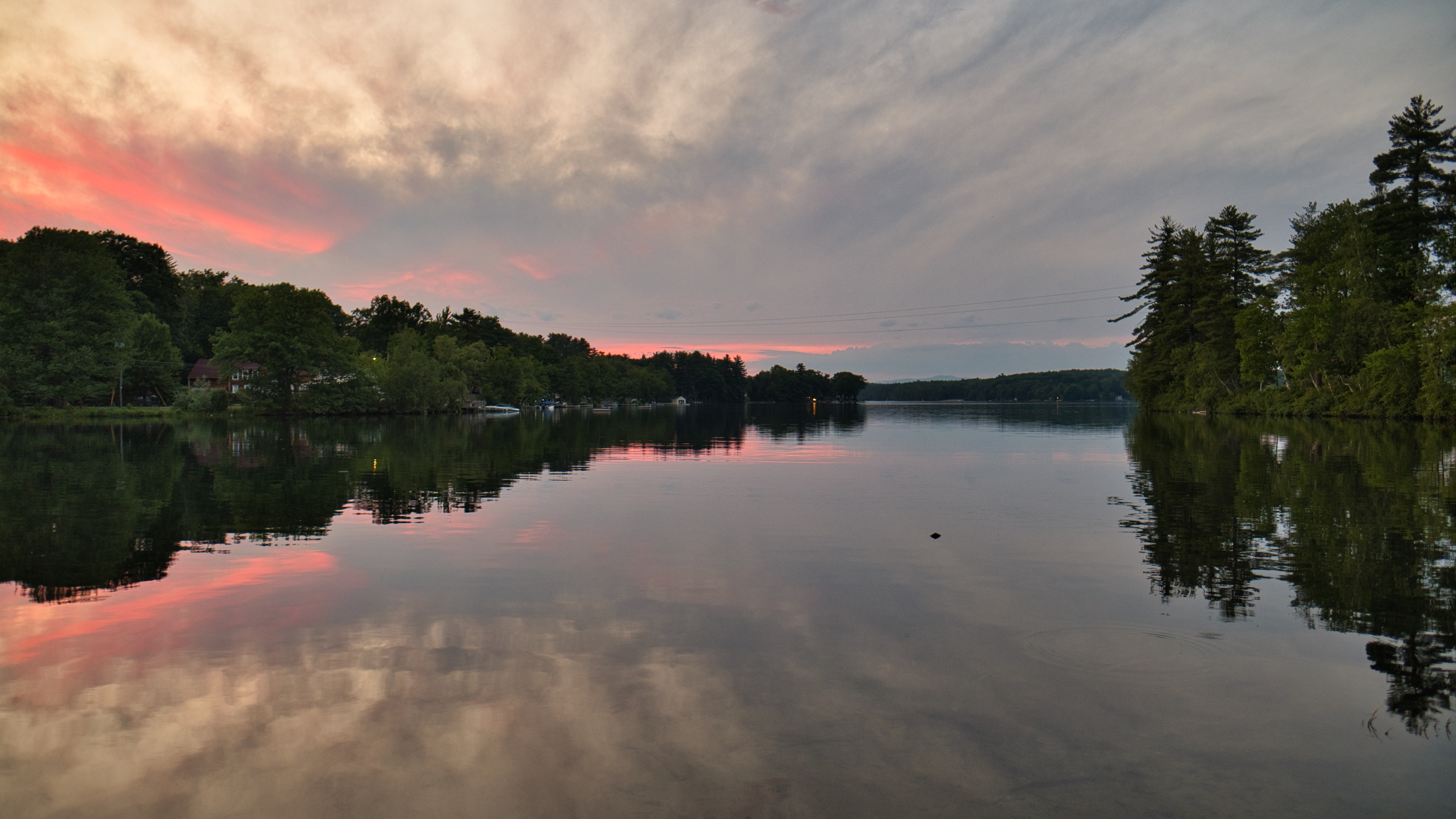
- Sunset on Opechee Bay

- Location within New Hampshire Location within the United States
- Location: Belknap County, New Hampshire
- Coordinates: 43°32′48″N 71°28′29″W
- Primary inflows: Paugus Bay
- Primary outflows: Winnipesaukee River
- Basin countries: United States
- Max. length: 2.6 mi (4.2 km)
- Max. width: 0.8 mi (1.3 km)
- Surface area: 449 acres (1.82 km^{2})
- Average depth: 23 ft (7.0 m)
- Max. depth: 61 ft (19 m)
- Surface elevation: 493 ft (150 m)
- Settlements: Laconia (including Lakeport)

Opechee Bay is a 449-acre (1.82 km^{2}) lake located in Belknap County in the Lakes Region of central New Hampshire, United States, in the city of Laconia. It is located directly downstream from Paugus Bay and Lake Winnipesaukee, and it connects by a one-mile segment of the Winnipesaukee River through the center of Laconia to Lake Winnisquam.

The lake is classified as a cold- and warmwater fishery, with observed species including brook trout, rainbow trout, land-locked salmon, lake trout, lake whitefish, smallmouth and largemouth bass, chain pickerel, horned pout, white perch, black crappie, and bluegill.

== See also ==
- List of lakes in New Hampshire
