= Bay Meeting House and Vestry =

Historic church in New Hampshire, United States

- U.S. National Register of Historic Places
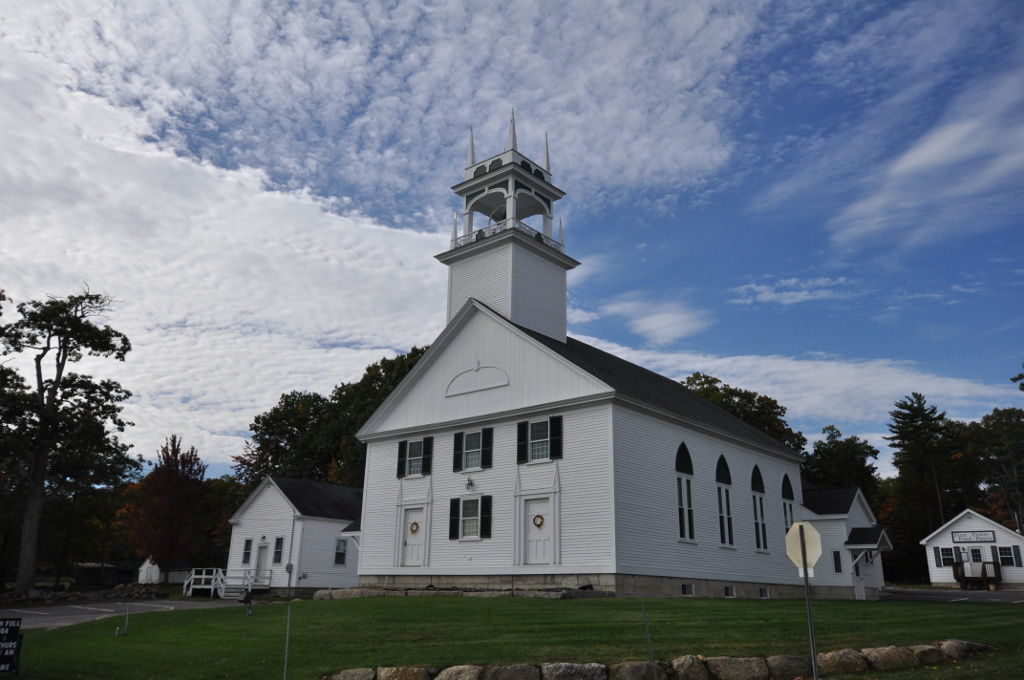

- Location within New Hampshire Location within the United States
- Location: Upper Bay and Steele Rds., Sanbornton, New Hampshire
- Coordinates: 43°32′17″N 71°32′12″W
- Area: 0.6 acres (0.24 ha)
- Built: 1836
- Architectural style: Federal, Gothic Revival
- NRHP reference No.: 84002508
- Added to NRHP: June 07, 1984

The Bay Meeting House and Vestry, now the Second Baptist Church, is a historic church complex on Upper Bay and Steele Hill Roads in Sanbornton, New Hampshire. Built in 1836 for a Free Will Baptist congregation headed by Moses Cheney, the church is a good example of transitional Federal and Gothic Revival architecture. It was listed on the National Register of Historic Places in 1984.

== Description and history ==
The Bay Meeting House is located in a rural area in northeastern Sanbornton, at the junction of Upper Bay and Steele Roads. The property is on high land overlooking Lake Winnisquam to the east, which was historically known as Sanbornton Bay, the origin of the church's name. The church is a two-story wood-frame structure, with a gabled roof topped by a two-stage square tower. The first stage is plain, with a projecting cornice topped by a low railing and Gothic spires at the corners. The second stage is an open belfry (now lacking a bell), with paneled square posts joined by segmental arched moulding. It is also topped at the corners by a narrower set of Gothic spires. The main facade is symmetrical, with a pair of entrances flanking a central window, and windows above each of these elements. Windows on the sides are topped by Gothic fans. The vestry is a relatively modest rectangular structure, built in 1841 with enlargements in the early 20th century and again in the 1980s.

The first Free Will Baptist meetinghouse was built on this site about 1808, for a congregation under the leadership of Rev. Moses Cheney. That organization was disbanded about 1816, when the Second Baptist Society was organized. A separate organization, the Second Baptist Church, was founded in 1822. The present church was built in 1836, and remained in ownership by the Society until it was transferred to the Church in 1955. Its exterior, a blend of Federal massing with Gothic features, has remained nearly unaltered since its construction. The vestry, built in 1841 and enlarged in the early 20th century, is a vernacular structure that is typical of its period.

== See also ==
- National Register of Historic Places listings in Belknap County, New Hampshire
