= Charles E. Tilton Mansion =

Historic house in New Hampshire, United States

- U.S. National Register of Historic Places
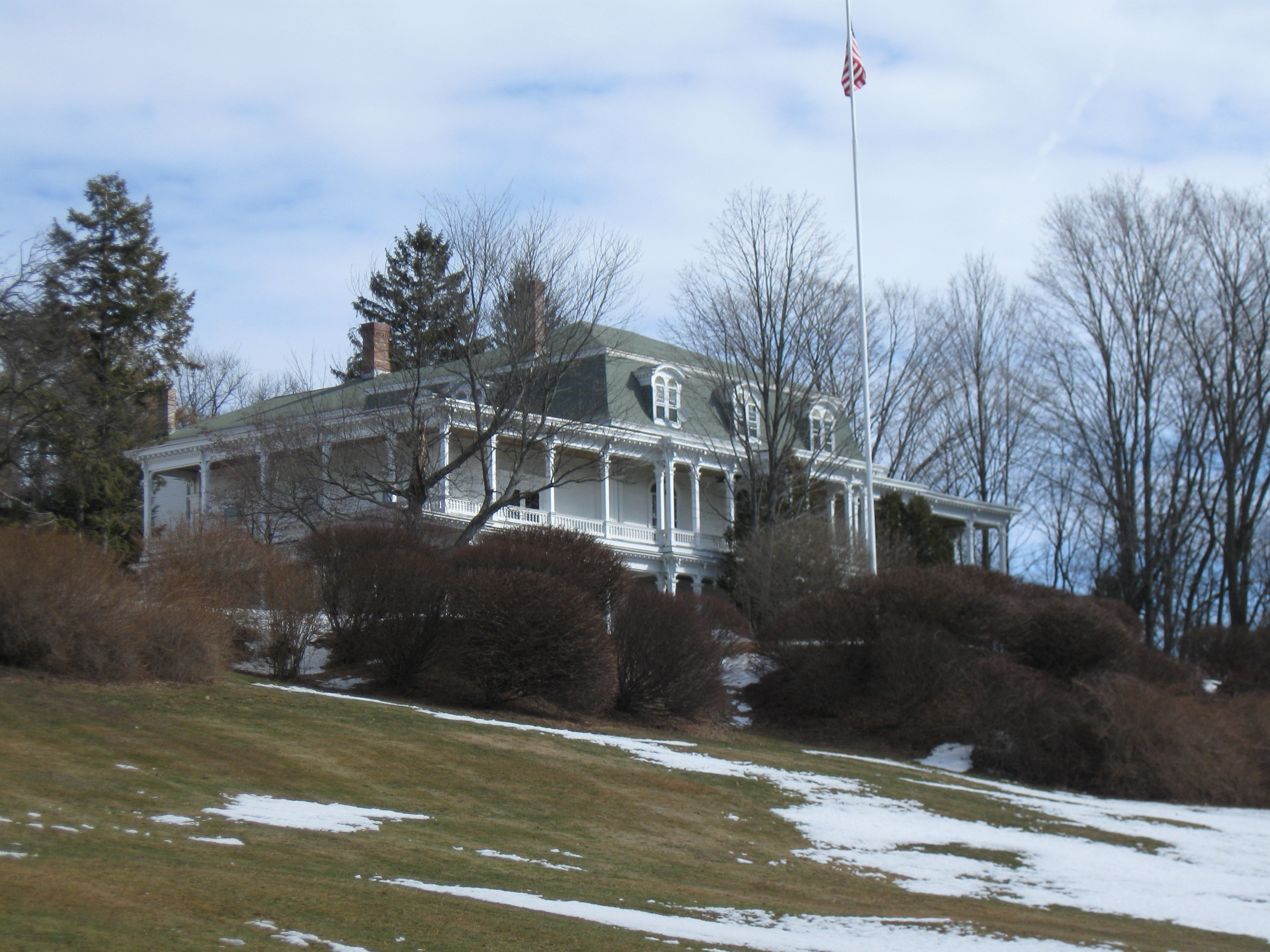

- Location within New Hampshire Location within the United States
- Location: School St., Tilton, New Hampshire
- Coordinates: 43°26′39″N 71°35′13″W
- Area: 0.7 acres (0.28 ha)
- Built: 1861
- NRHP reference No.: 82004995
- Added to NRHP: August 10, 1982

The Charles E. Tilton Mansion, now the Lucian Hunt Library, stands on the campus of the Tilton School in Tilton, New Hampshire, United States. Built in the 1860s and enlarged several times in the 19th century, it is one of the state's most architecturally eclectic houses. It was built by banker and philanthropist Charles E. Tilton, for whose family the town is named. The building was listed on the National Register of Historic Places in 1982. It was acquired by the Tilton School in 1962 and adapted for use as its library, which is named for Lucius Hunt, a teacher of Classics at the school.

== Description and history ==
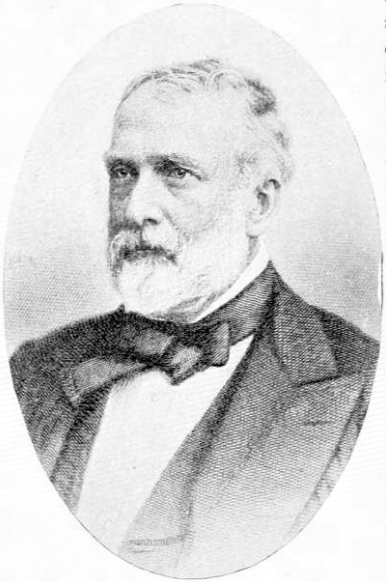
Charles Elliott Tilton

The former Tilton mansion is located on the eastern side of the Tilton School campus, at the southeastern corner of a campus loop road on the east side of School Street. It is a three-story wood-frame building with a mansard roof, built in the early 1860s. Two-story wings extend to the sides of the main block, and a three-story hip-roof service wing extends to the rear. A two-story porch extends around three sides of the main block. The interior is a stylistically eclectic mix, embracing not just the Second Empire which characterizes the exterior, but also Renaissance and Classical Revival elements.

Charles Tilton, its builder, was a major force in banking and the Pacific merchant trade, operating banks and railroads in the American Pacific Northwest (now Washington and Oregon), as well as investing in real estate there. Tilton was born in what is now Tilton (then part of Sanbornton), and he was a generous benefactor to the town of Tilton, which was named in honor of his grandfather and in recognition of his public gifts. The core of the house was built about 1861, and was enlarged after Tilton ended his western business interests in 1879. The house was acquired by the Tilton School in the 1960s, and adapted for use as its library.

== See also ==
- National Register of Historic Places listings in Belknap County, New Hampshire
