= Belmont Public Library (New Hampshire) =

- U.S. National Register of Historic Places
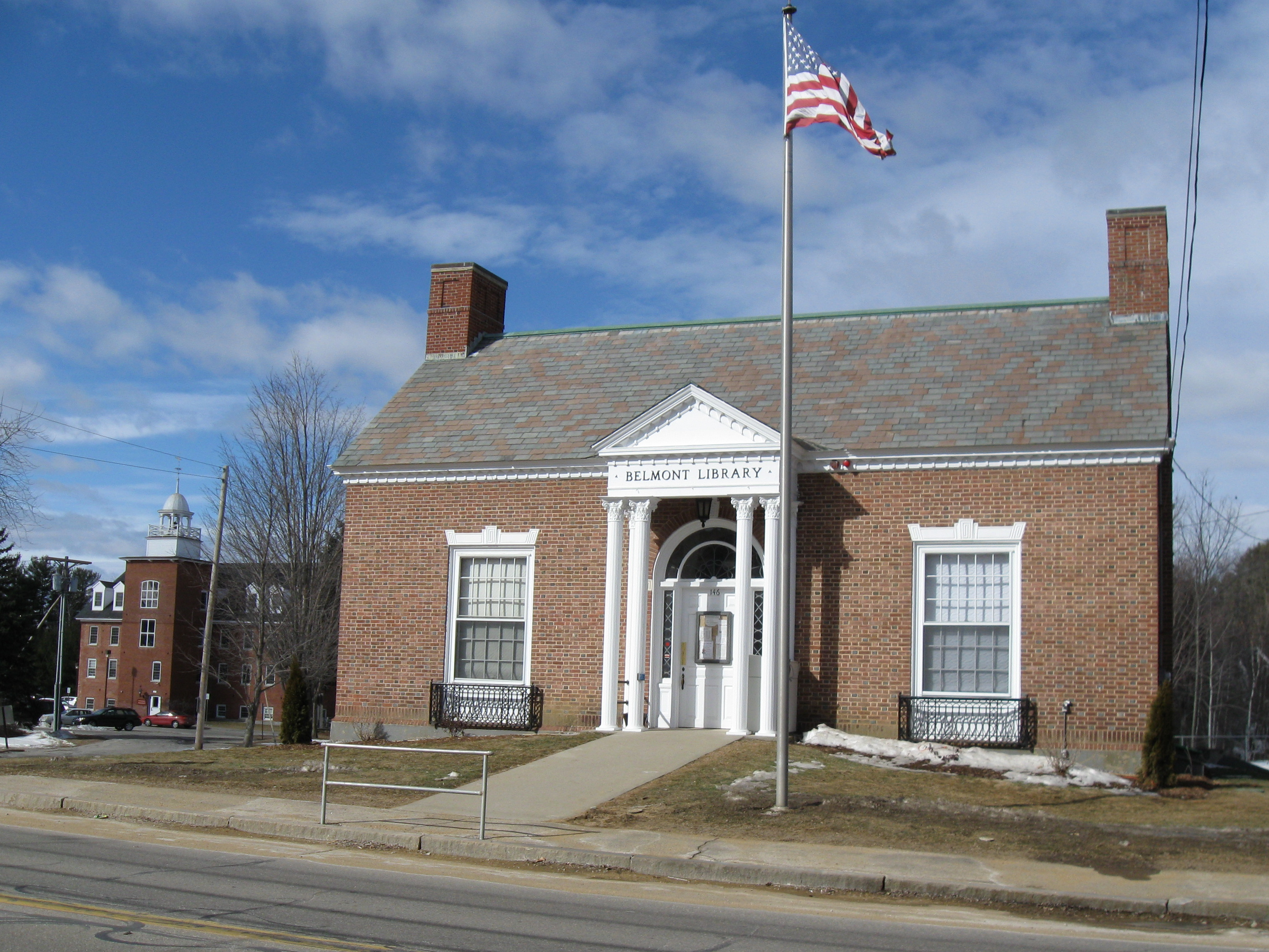

- Location within New Hampshire Location within the United States
- Location: 146 Main St., Belmont, New Hampshire
- Coordinates: 43°26′37″N 71°28′57″W
- Area: 0.2 acres (0.081 ha)
- Built: 1927
- Architect: Wells & Hudson
- Architectural style: Colonial Revival
- NRHP reference No.: 85002191
- Added to NRHP: September 12, 1985

The Belmont Library is the public library of Belmont, New Hampshire. It is located at 146 Main Street, in an architecturally distinguished single-story brick Colonial Revival structure designed by Wells & Hudson and built in 1927-28.

== Architecture and history ==
The Belmont Library is located near the center of the town's village center, at the corner of Main and Mill streets. It is a modest single-story masonry structure, built out of red brick and covered by a gabled slate roof. It has a three-bay front facade, with windows occupying the outer bays and the main entrance the center. The windows are rectangular sash, topped by a keystoned lintel and fronted by a shallow wrought iron balcony. The entrance is sheltered by a narrow portico, which has paired Corinthian columns rising to an entablature and bracketed full pediment. The library's name appears on the entablature. The entry is set in a round-arch opening, with flanking sidelight windows and a half-round transom window above. The interior has fine decorative woodwork, and is laid out with a central librarian's desk and flanking reading rooms. The vestibule area and the end fireplaces each project into the space. The basement houses a small auditorium.

The library was established in 1893, and was originally located in the second floor of the Hose House (fire station). This building was constructed when the library outgrew that space, and was a gift (along with an operating endowment) of the Duffy brothers, owners of the Belmont Hosiery Company. It is one of the finest examples of Colonial Revival architecture in New Hampshire's Lakes Region. The building is listed on the National Register of Historic Places.

== See also ==
- National Register of Historic Places listings in Belknap County, New Hampshire
