= Winston H. McCarty =

American politician (1928–2025)

Member of the New Hampshire House of Representatives from the Hillsborough 38th district
- In office 1992–2000

Personal details
- Born: Winston Herbert McCarty; July 29, 1928 Berlin, New Hampshire, U.S.
- Died: June 26, 2025 (aged 96) Tilton, New Hampshire, U.S.
- Party: Republican

Winston Herbert McCarty (July 29, 1928 – June 26, 2025) was an American politician. A member of the Republican Party, he served in the New Hampshire House of Representatives from 1992 to 2000.

== Life and career ==
McCarty was born in Berlin, New Hampshire, the son of Herbert McCarty and Nina Hodgdon. He attended Berlin High School, graduating in 1946. After graduating, he worked as a lineworker.

McCarty served in the New Hampshire House of Representatives from 1992 to 2000.

McCarty died at the New Hampshire Veterans Home in Tilton, New Hampshire, on June 26, 2025, at the age of 96.
