= Sanbornton, New Hampshire =

- Town
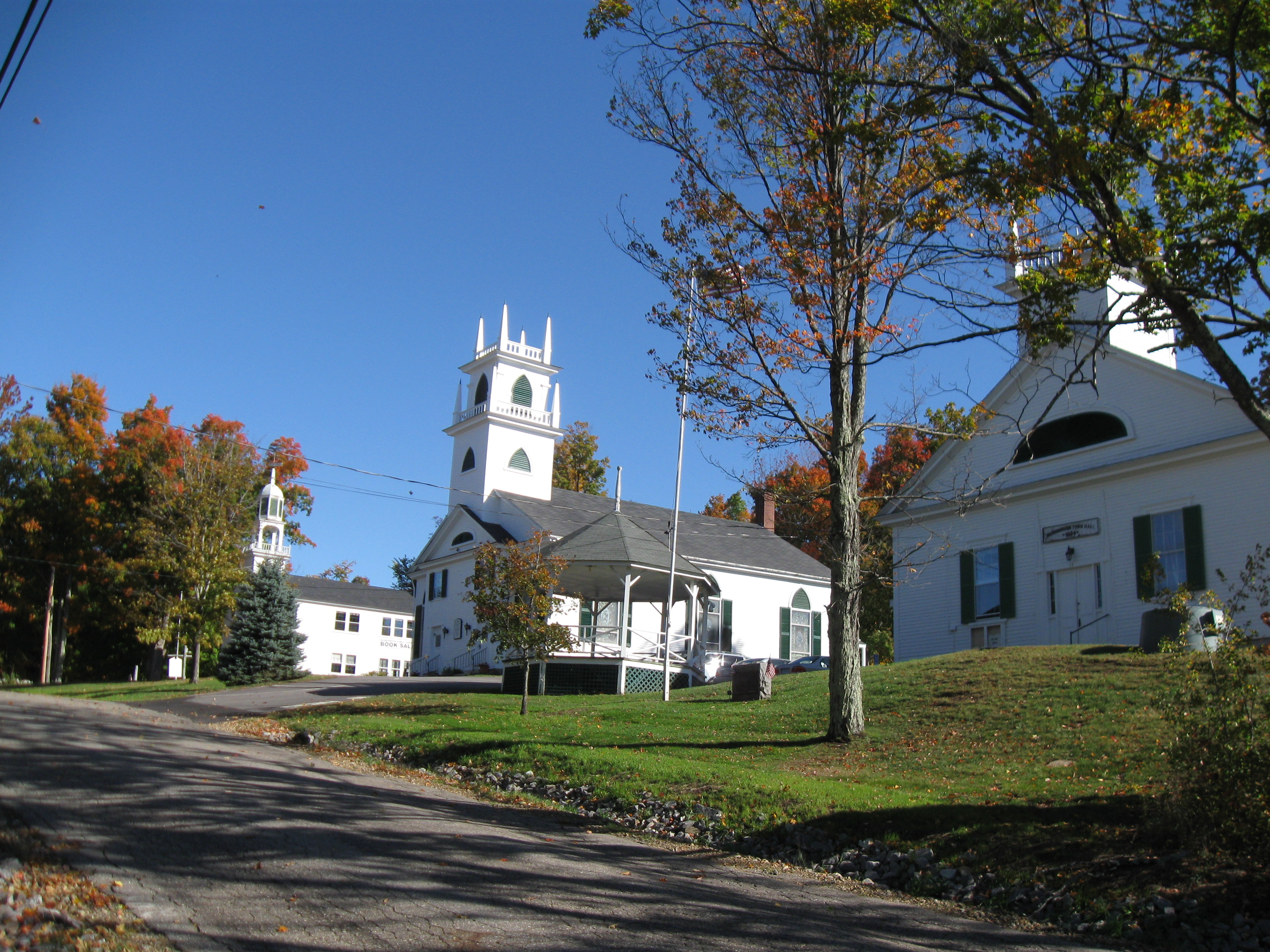
- Sanbornton Square Historic District

- Seal

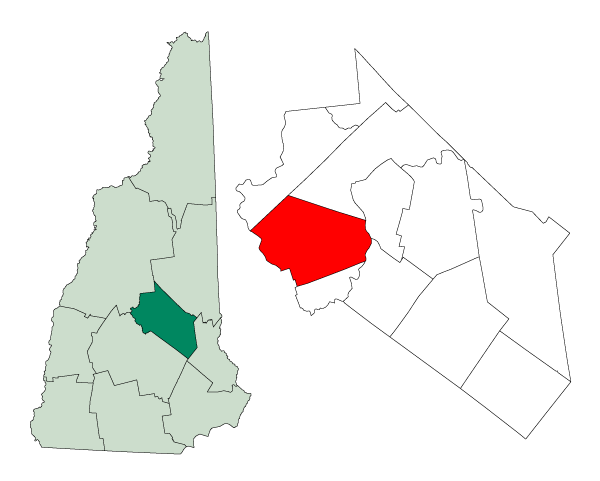
- Location in Belknap County, New Hampshire
- Coordinates: 43°29′45″N 71°34′41″W
- Country: United States
- State: New Hampshire
- County: Belknap
- Incorporated: 1770
- Villages: Bay Meetinghouse; Gaza; North Sanbornton; Sanbornton; Winnisquam

Area
  - Total: 49.7 sq mi (128.6 km^{2})
  - Land: 47.4 sq mi (122.7 km^{2})
  - Water: 2.3 sq mi (5.9 km^{2}) 4.58%
- Elevation: 823 ft (251 m)

Population (2020)
  - Total: 3,026
  - Density: 64/sq mi (24.7/km^{2})
- Time zone: UTC-5 (Eastern)
  - Summer (DST): UTC-4 (Eastern)
- ZIP code: 03269
- Area code: 603
- FIPS code: 33-67300
- GNIS feature ID: 873715
- Website: www.sanborntonnh.org

Sanbornton is a town in Belknap County, New Hampshire, United States. The population was 3,026 at the 2020 census, and an estimated 3,038 in 2025. It includes the villages of North Sanbornton and Gaza.

== History ==
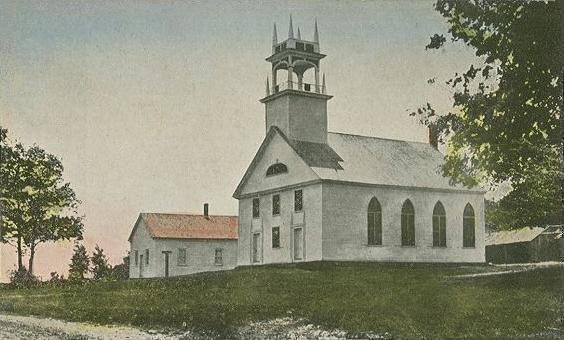
Bay Meeting House c. 1910

Located in the fork of the Pemigewasset and Winnipesaukee rivers, the town was first called "Crotchtown". It was granted by colonial Governor Benning Wentworth in 1748 to his friend John Sanborn of Hampton, along with 59 others from Hampton, Exeter and Stratham. Twelve of the grantees were named Sanborn, therefore the community was named "Sanborntown". Among the other settlers were members of the Leavitt family, related to the Sanborns. But ongoing hostilities during the French and Indian War delayed permanent settlement until 1764. It would be incorporated by Governor John Wentworth in 1770.

There was a border adjustment to Merrimack and Strafford counties on December 24, 1828, that affected Northfield and Sanborntown. The town originally included Sanbornton Bridge, or Bridge Village, set off in 1869 as Tilton.

== Geography ==
According to the United States Census Bureau, the town has a total area of 49.7 square miles (128.6 km^{2}), of which 47.4 sq mi (122.7 km^{2}) are land and 2.3 sq mi (5.9 km^{2}) are water, comprising 4.58% of the town. Bounded on the west by the Pemigewasset River and on the east by Lake Winnisquam, Sanbornton is largely drained by Salmon Brook, a tributary of the Pemigewasset. The highest point in town is the summit of Hersey Mountain, elevation 2,001 feet (610 m) above sea level, along the town's northwestern border.

The town is served by Interstate 93, New Hampshire Route 132, and New Hampshire Route 127. I-93 accesses the town via Exit 22 (NH 127) and leads north to Plymouth and south to Concord. NH 132 parallels I-93 as a local road, connecting Tilton to the south with New Hampton and Ashland to the north. NH 127 intersects NH 132 in the village of Gaza within Sanbornton and leads southwest to Franklin. U.S. Route 3 crosses a very small southeastern corner of Sanbornton at the village of Winnisquam, where the road crosses Lake Winnisquam.

=== Adjacent municipalities ===
- Meredith (north)
- Laconia (northeast)
- Belmont (east)
- Tilton (south)
- Franklin (southwest)
- Hill (west)
- New Hampton (northwest)

== Demographics ==
Historical population
Census	Pop.	Note	%±
1790	1,587		—
1800	2,695		69.8%
1810	2,884		7.0%
1820	3,329		15.4%
1830	2,866		−13.9%
1840	2,745		−4.2%
1850	2,695		−1.8%
1860	2,743		1.8%
1870	1,236		−54.9%
1880	1,192		−3.6%
1890	1,027		−13.8%
1900	944		−8.1%
1910	850		−10.0%
1920	617		−27.4%
1930	654		6.0%
1940	677		3.5%
1950	755		11.5%
1960	857		13.5%
1970	1,022		19.3%
1980	1,679		64.3%
1990	2,136		27.2%
2000	2,581		20.8%
2010	2,966		14.9%
2020	3,026		2.0%
2024 (est.)	3,057		1.0%
U.S. Decennial Census

As of the 2000 census, there were 2,581 people, 969 households, and 749 families residing in the town. The population density was 54.3 inhabitants per square mile (21.0/km^{2}). There were 1,359 housing units at an average density of 28.6 per square mile (11.0/km^{2}). The racial makeup of the town was 98.14% White, 0.15% African American, 0.15% Native American, 0.50% Asian, 0.12% from other races, and 0.93% from two or more races. Hispanic or Latino of any race were 0.43% of the population.

There were 969 households, out of which 33.0% had children under the age of 18 living with them, 64.7% were married couples living together, 8.9% had a female householder with no husband present, and 22.7% were non-families. 16.8% of all households were made up of individuals, and 6.5% had someone living alone who was 65 years of age or older. The average household size was 2.66 and the average family size was 2.97.

In the town, the population was spread out, with 25.3% under the age of 18, 6.4% from 18 to 24, 28.9% from 25 to 44, 28.4% from 45 to 64, and 10.9% who were 65 years of age or older. The median age was 40 years. For every 100 females, there were 98.4 males. For every 100 females age 18 and over, there were 97.5 males.

The median income for a household in the town was $48,458, and the median income for a family was $52,179. Males had a median income of $35,472 versus $26,117 for females. The per capita income for the town was $22,879. About 2.2% of families and 5.1% of the population were below the poverty line, including 8.4% of those under age 18 and 4.3% of those age 65 or over.

== Government ==
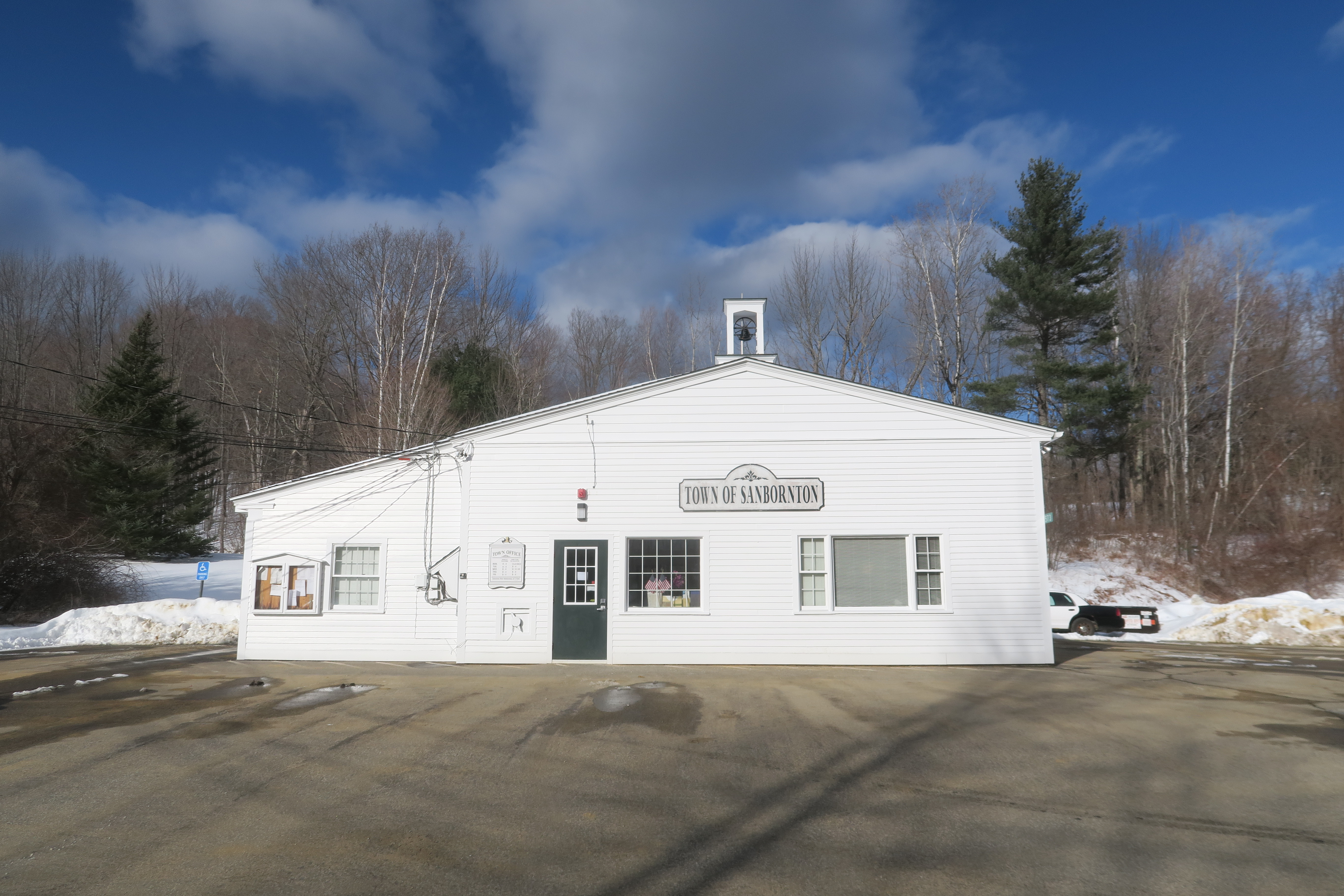
Town hall

In the New Hampshire Senate, Sanbornton is in the 2nd district, represented by Republican Tim Lang. On the New Hampshire Executive Council, Sanbornton is in the 1st district, represented by Republican Joseph Kenney. In the United States House of Representatives, Sanbornton is in New Hampshire's 1st congressional district, represented by Democrat Chris Pappas.

== Notable people ==
- Albert E. Bodwell (1851–1926), noted 19th-century New Hampshire architect
- Sarah A. Colby (1824–1904), physician
- Joseph M. Harper (1787–1865), U.S. Representative, Acting Governor of New Hampshire
- Don Kent (1917–2010), meteorologist
- Lois Lowry (born 1937), children's author (summer resident)
- Daniel S. Miles (1772–1845), religious leader
- George W. Swain (1824–1904), Wisconsin state senator
- Esther W. Taylor (1826–1904), physician
