= Lochmere, New Hampshire =

Unincorporated community in New Hampshire, United States

- Unincorporated community
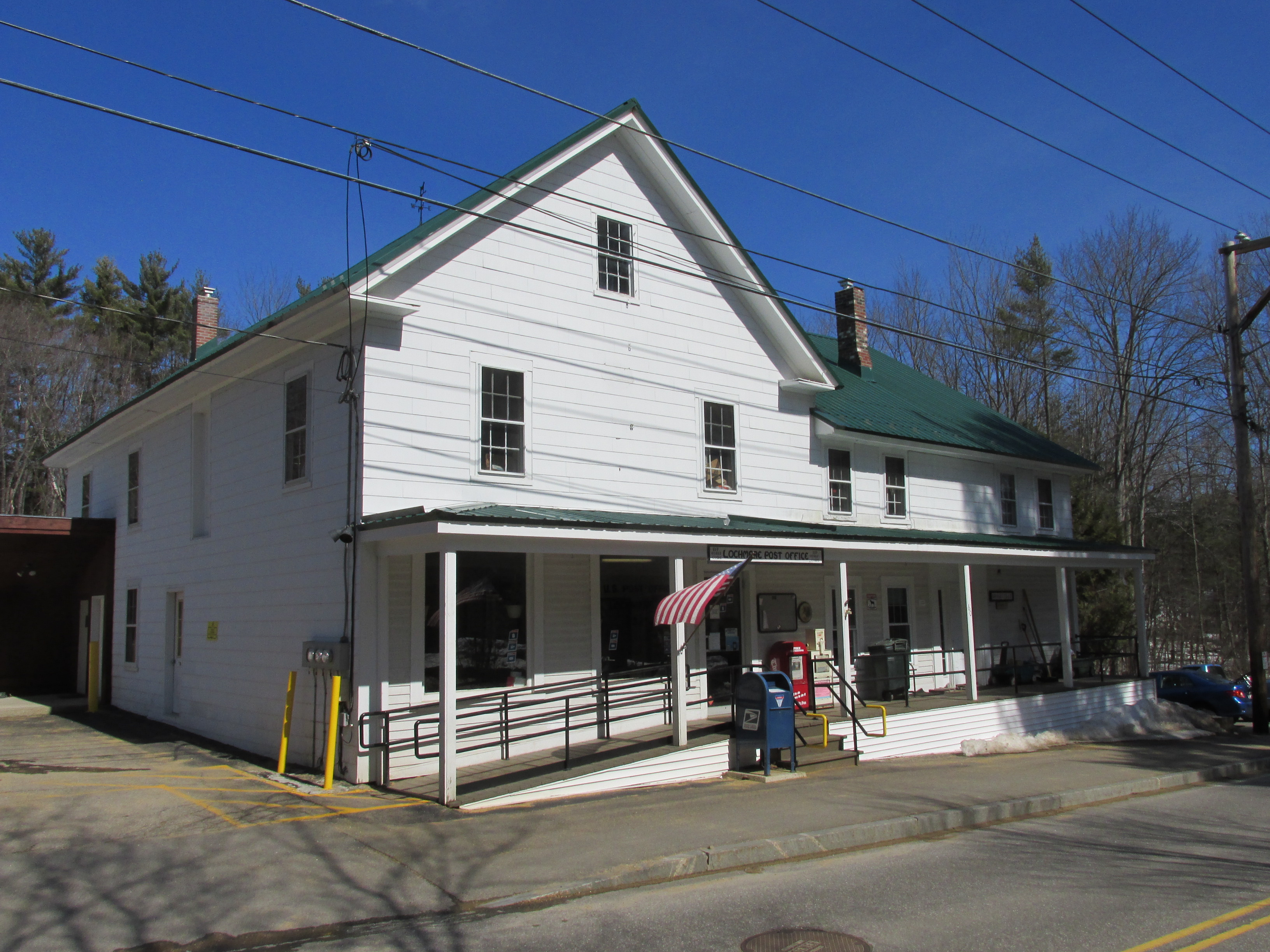
- Lochmere Post Office

- Location within New Hampshire Location within the United States
- Coordinates: 43°28′25″N 71°32′26″W
- Country: United States
- State: New Hampshire
- County: Belknap
- Towns: Tilton, Belmont
- Elevation: 522 ft (159 m)
- Time zone: UTC-5 (Eastern (EST))
  - Summer (DST): UTC-4 (EDT)
- ZIP code: 03252
- Area code: 603
- GNIS feature ID: 868111

Lochmere is an unincorporated community in the towns of Tilton and Belmont in Belknap County, New Hampshire, United States. It is located along U.S. Route 3 and New Hampshire Route 11, which connect the village with Laconia to the northeast and to the center of Tilton and to Franklin to the southwest. It is close to the Winnipesaukee River as it connects the outlet of Lake Winnisquam to the north with Silver Lake to the south.

Lochmere has a separate ZIP code (03252) from the rest of the town of Tilton.

== See also ==
- Lochmere Archeological District
