= Tilton, New Hampshire =

- Town
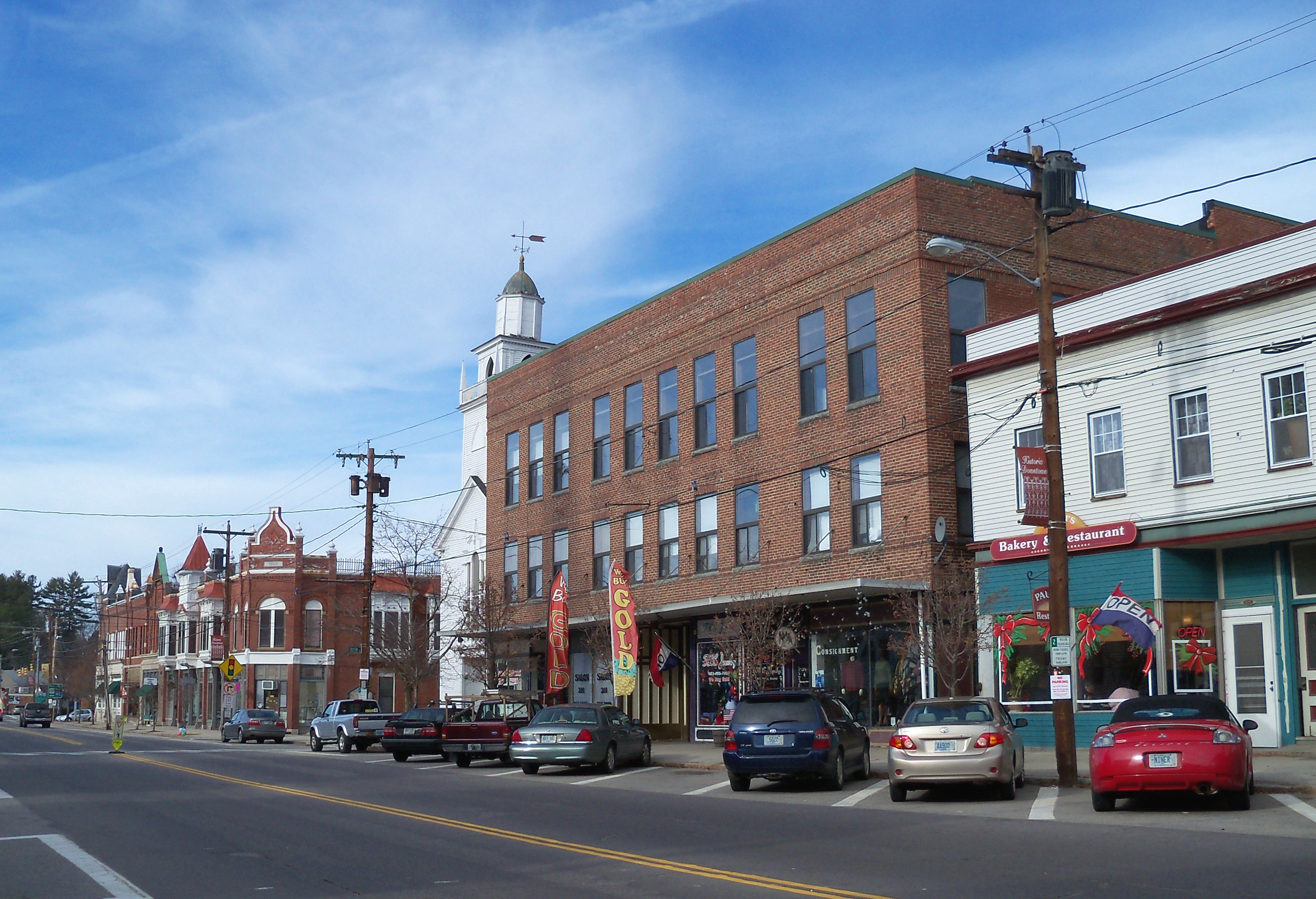
- Downtown Tilton

- Seal

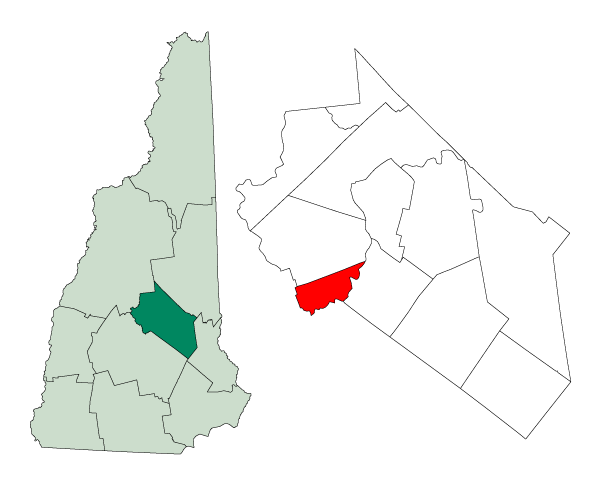
- Location in Belknap County, New Hampshire
- Coordinates: 43°28′1″N 71°34′30″W
- Country: United States
- State: New Hampshire
- County: Belknap
- Incorporated: 1869
- Villages: Tilton; Lochmere; Winnisquam; The Plains; East Tilton

Area
  - Total: 11.94 sq mi (30.93 km^{2})
  - Land: 11.15 sq mi (28.87 km^{2})
  - Water: 0.80 sq mi (2.06 km^{2}) 6.67%
- Elevation: 492 ft (150 m)

Population (2020)
  - Total: 3,962
  - Density: 356/sq mi (137.3/km^{2})
- Time zone: UTC-5 (Eastern)
  - Summer (DST): UTC-4 (Eastern)
- ZIP codes: 03276, 03298, 03299
- Area code: 603
- FIPS code: 33-77060
- GNIS feature ID: 873739
- Website: www.tiltonnh.org

Tilton is a town on the Winnipesaukee River in Belknap County, New Hampshire, United States. The population was 3,962 at the 2020 census, and an estimated 4,092 in 2025, up from 3,567 at the 2010 census. It includes the village of Tilton (which makes up part of the census-designated place of Tilton Northfield), East Tilton (near Lake Winnisquam), The Plains (near East Tilton), and part of the villages of Winnisquam and Lochmere. Tilton is home to the Tilton School, a private preparatory school.

== History ==
Originally the southern part of Sanbornton, the present area of Tilton was known as "Sanbornton Bridge" and "Bridge Village". These two names refer to the bridge, built in 1763, that crossed the Winnipesaukee River from Canterbury to Sanbornton and onto what is now Main Street in Tilton. In 1869, Sanbornton Bridge was set off and incorporated as Tilton, named in honor of Nathaniel Tilton (1726–1814), whose great-grandson Charles E. Tilton (1827–1901) was the owner of textile mills and the community's wealthiest citizen. (Note: The town's website more generally states that in naming the town, Charles E. Tilton "asked that the name be given, not for himself, but for his ancestors.") Nathaniel Tilton established an iron foundry and the area's first hotel, the Dexter House. Charles E. Tilton donated many statues to the town, a unique feature, and his estate is now part of the Tilton School. Tilton Hall, his former mansion built in 1861, houses the Lucian Hunt Library. The attached carriage house was renovated in 1980 to become the Helene Grant Daly Art Center.

Charles E. Tilton also donated what is perhaps the most notable landmark in the area, the hilltop Memorial Arch, located in the neighboring town of Northfield, across the Winnipesaukee River from the center of Tilton. The Roman arch replica was built in the late 1800s as a memorial to his ancestors. It is built of Concord granite, 50 feet (15 m) high and 40 feet (12 m) wide.

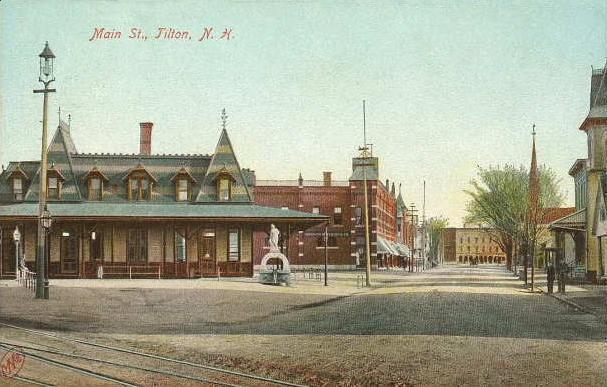
Main Street in 1909

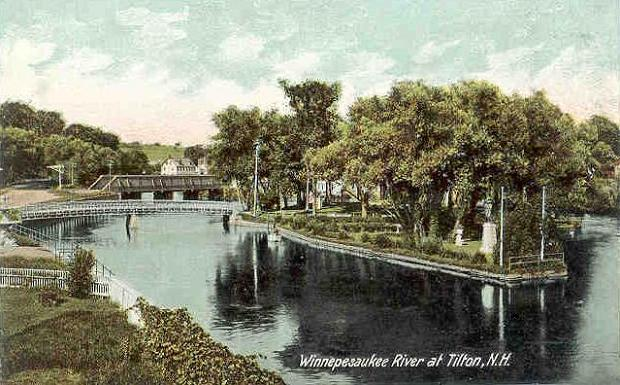
Tilton Island Park c. 1908

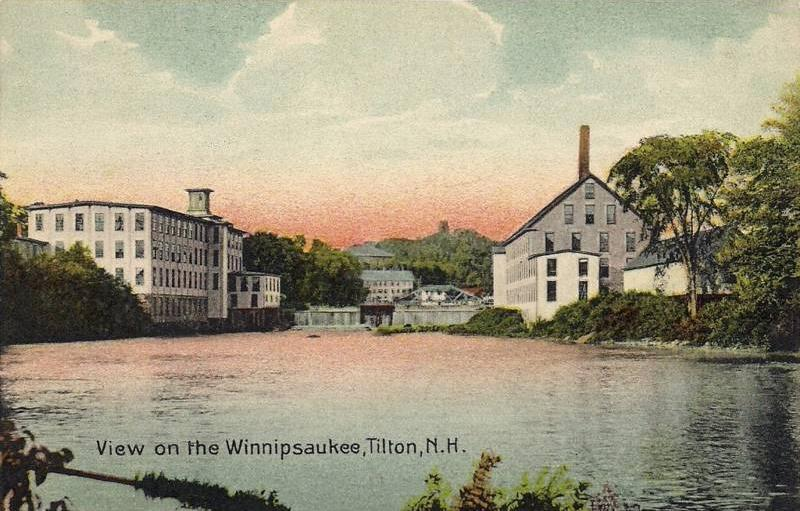
View of the mills in 1908

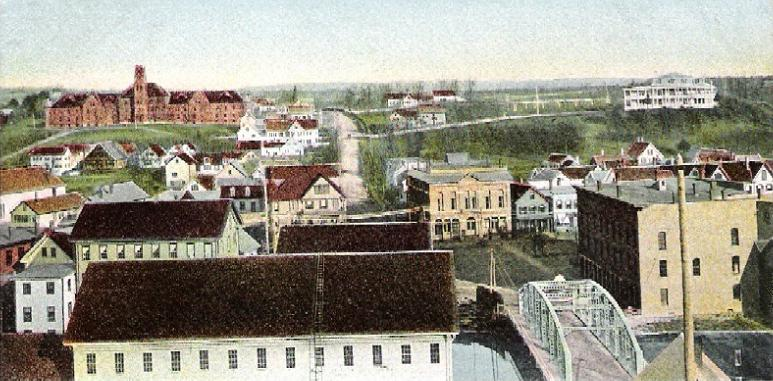
View from Arch Hill in 1906

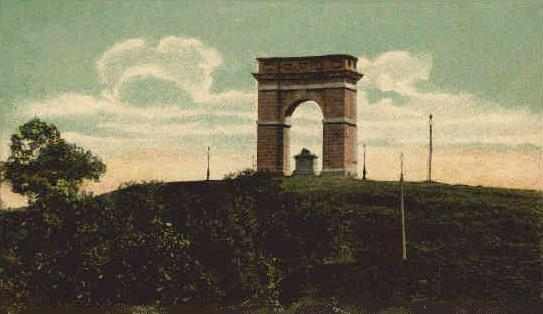
Memorial Arch (Northfield) in 1909

== Geography ==
According to the United States Census Bureau, the town has a total area of 11.9 square miles (30.9 km^{2}), of which 11.2 square miles (28.9 km^{2}) are land and 0.81 square miles (2.1 km^{2}) are water, comprising 6.67% of the town. Tilton is drained by the Winnipesaukee River. It is bounded on the east by Silver Lake and Lake Winnisquam.

The highest point in Tilton is 866 feet (264 m) above sea level, along the town's northern border, near the summit of Calef Hill.

Tilton is served by Interstate 93, U.S. Route 3, and state routes 11, 132 and 140. Tilton is considered the gateway to the Lakes Region of the state, and a large commercial and retail district has sprung up at the intersection of the five aforementioned routes, just off Exit 20 of I-93. The historic village of Tilton is located a short distance to the west of the new commercial development, on the northern banks of the Winnipesaukee.

=== Adjacent municipalities ===
- Sanbornton (north)
- Belmont (east)
- Northfield (south)
- Franklin (west)

== Demographics ==
Historical population
Census	Pop.	Note	%±
1870	1,147		—
1880	1,232		7.4%
1890	1,521		23.5%
1900	1,926		26.6%
1910	1,866		−3.1%
1920	2,014		7.9%
1930	1,712		−15.0%
1940	1,738		1.5%
1950	2,085		20.0%
1960	2,137		2.5%
1970	2,579		20.7%
1980	3,387		31.3%
1990	3,240		−4.3%
2000	3,477		7.3%
2010	3,567		2.6%
2020	3,962		11.1%
2024 (est.)	4,116		3.9%
U.S. Decennial Census

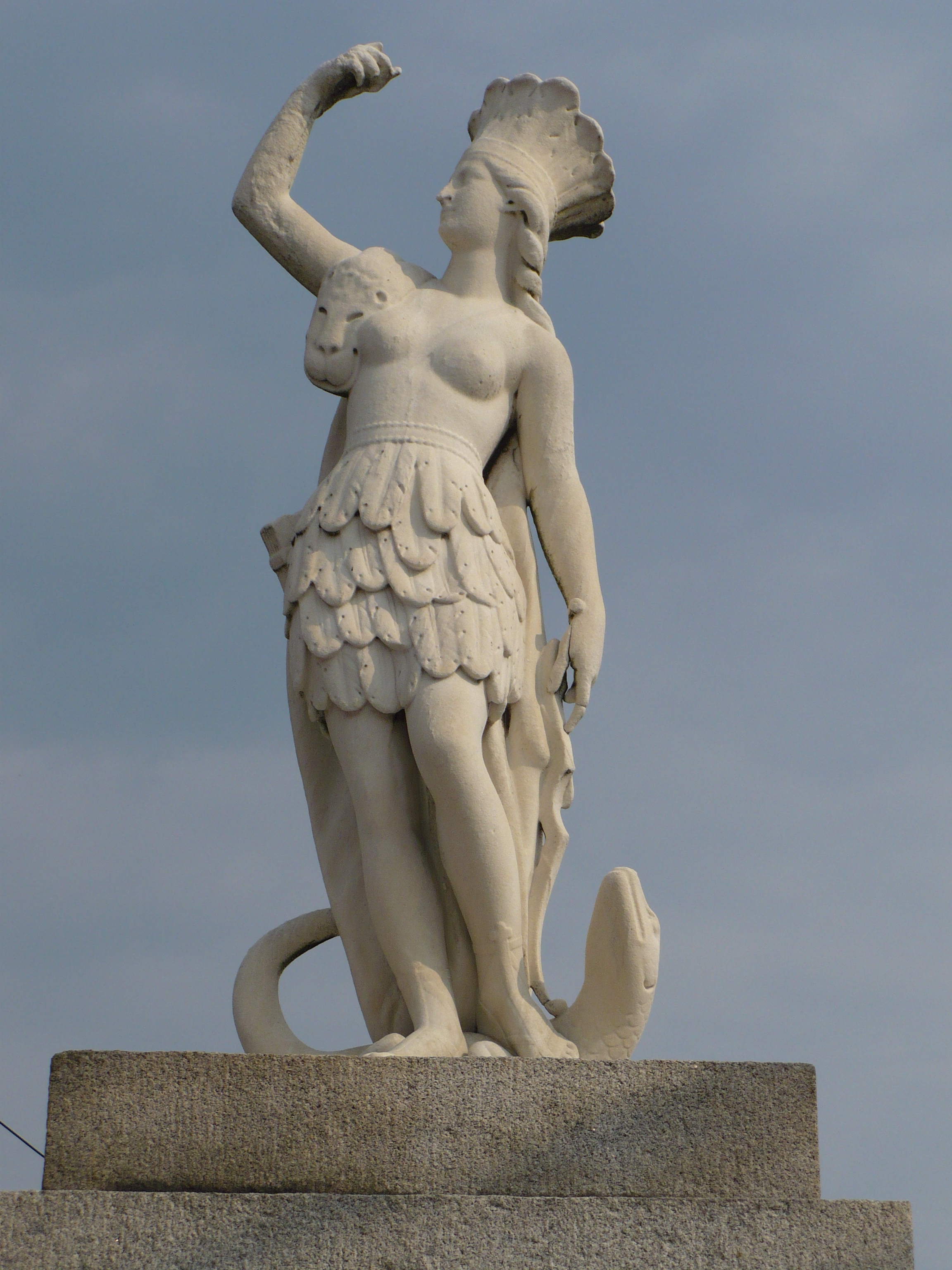
Marble statue of Indian queen, representing the Americas, donated by Charles E. Tilton

As of the 2010 census, there were 3,567 people, 1,462 households, and 888 families residing in the town. There were 1,845 housing units, of which 383, or 20.8%, were vacant. 212 of the vacant units were for seasonal or recreational use. The racial makeup of the town was 96.2% White, 0.4% African American, 0.2% Native American, 1.4% Asian, 0.0% Native Hawaiian or Pacific Islander, 0.2% some other race, and 1.7% from two or more races. 1.1% of the population were Hispanic or Latino of any race.

Of the 1,462 households, 25.2% had children under the age of 18 living with them, 46.4% were headed by married couples living together, 9.5% had a female householder with no husband present, and 39.3% were non-families. 30.2% of all households were made up of individuals, and 11.6% were someone living alone who was 65 years of age or older. The average household size was 2.28, and the average family size was 2.83.

In the town, 17.9% of the population were under the age of 18, 7.4% were from 18 to 24, 24.5% from 25 to 44, 30.4% from 45 to 64, and 20.0% were 65 years of age or older. The median age was 45.2 years. For every 100 females, there were 106.2 males. For every 100 females age 18 and over, there were 106.2 males.

For the period 2011–2015, the estimated median annual income for a household was $54,276, and the median income for a family was $59,754. Male full-time workers had a median income of $40,132 versus $36,715 for females. The per capita income for the town was $28,510. 8.3% of the population and 4.6% of families were below the poverty line. 16.6% of the population under the age of 18 and 6.4% of those 65 or older were living in poverty.

== Government ==
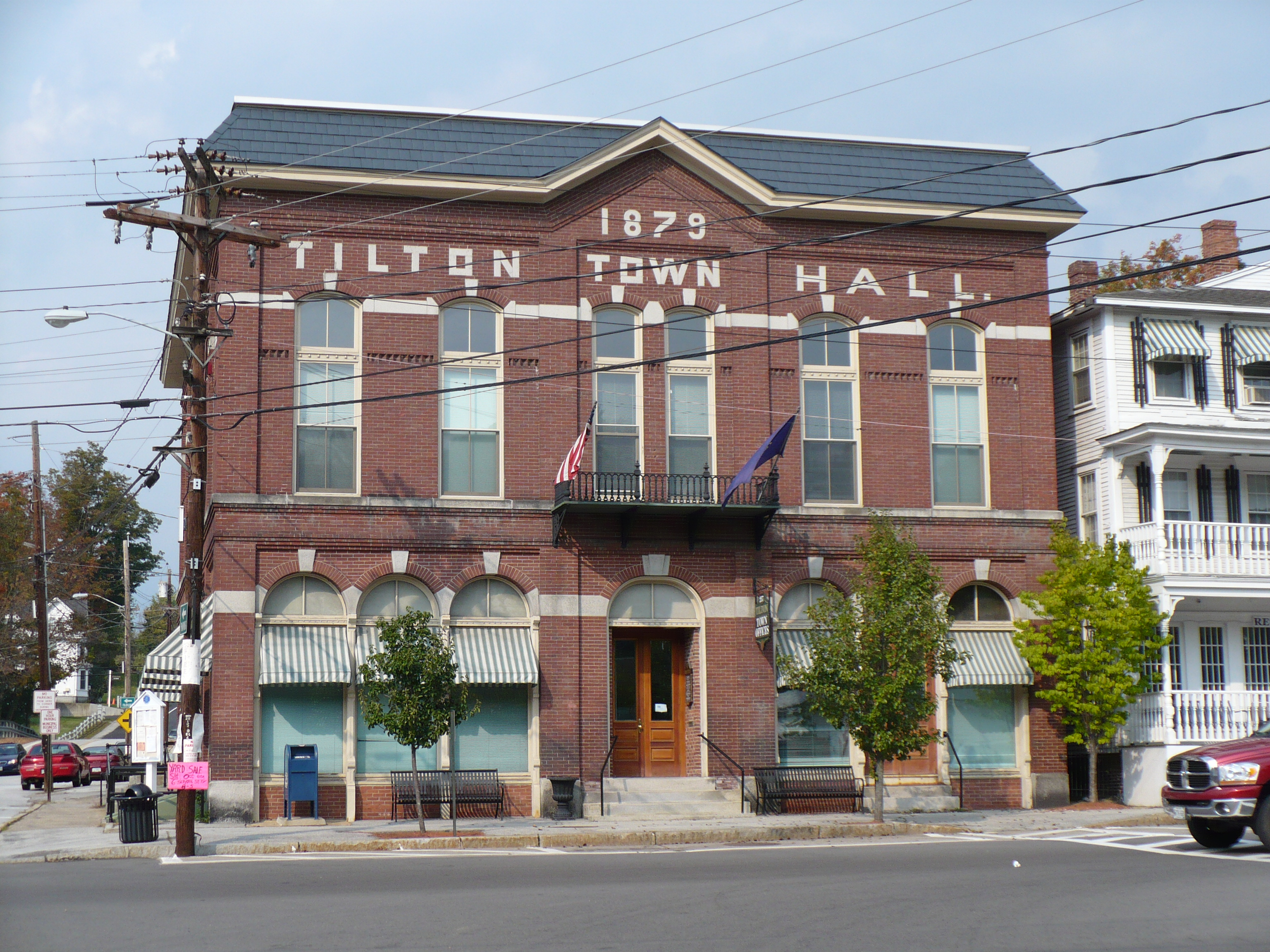
Tilton Town Hall

In the New Hampshire Senate, Tilton is in the 2nd district, represented by Republican Bob Giuda. On the New Hampshire Executive Council, Tilton is in the 1st district, represented by Republican Joseph Kenney. In the United States House of Representatives, Tilton is in New Hampshire's 1st congressional district, represented by Democrat Chris Pappas.

== Notable people ==
- John Charles Daly (1914–1991), television personality, network executive
- Mary Baker Eddy (1821–1910), founder of Christian Science
- John W. Gowdy (1869–1963), bishop of the Methodist Episcopal Church and Methodist Church
- William W. Joscelyn (1926–2015), member of the New Hampshire House of Representatives
- Paul I. LaMott (1917–2011), member of the New Hampshire House of Representatives
- Winston H. McCarty (1928–2025), member of the New Hampshire House of Representatives
- Jonathan Page (born 1976), American champion cyclocross racer
- Harry Taylor (1862–1930), US Army major general and USACE Chief of Engineer

== Sites of interest ==
- New Hampshire Historical Marker No. 149: Lochmere Archeological District
- New Hampshire Historical Marker No. 262: Charles E. Tilton's Legacy
