= Northfield, New Hampshire =

- Town
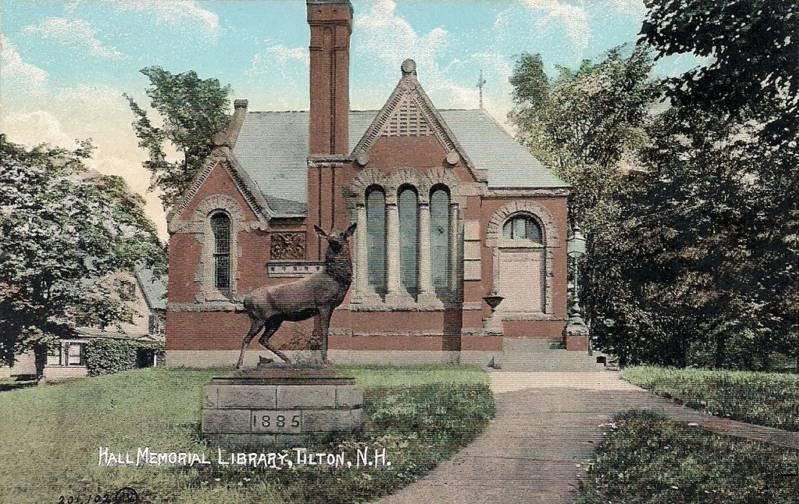
- Hall Memorial Library c. 1905

- Seal
- Motto: "A Great Place to Live!"
- Location in Merrimack County and the state of New Hampshire
- Coordinates: 43°24′41″N 71°34′27″W
- Country: United States
- State: New Hampshire
- County: Merrimack
- Incorporated: 1780

Area
  - Total: 28.9 sq mi (74.8 km^{2})
  - Land: 28.5 sq mi (73.8 km^{2})
  - Water: 0.39 sq mi (1.0 km^{2}) 1.27%
- Elevation: 623 ft (190 m)

Population (2020)
  - Total: 4,872
  - Density: 170/sq mi (66/km^{2})
- Time zone: UTC-5 (Eastern)
  - Summer (DST): UTC-4 (Eastern)
- ZIP code: 03276
- Area code: 603
- FIPS code: 33-54260
- GNIS feature ID: 873686
- Website: www.northfieldnh.org

Northfield is a town in Merrimack County, New Hampshire, United States. The population was 4,872 at the 2020 census.

== History ==
European settlers first arrived in Northfield in the early 1700s. Initially, Northfield was incorporated as part of Canterbury when that town was established in 1741. At the time it was a frontier town protected by a garrison fort erected on a hill close to Canterbury Center and commanded by Capt. Jeremiah Clough. Tradition has it that the first settlers of the "north fields" of Canterbury came from the scouts from this fort who patrolled the area in the 1740s.

The north fields of Canterbury prospered. Farming was the principal industry. Additionally, dams along the Winnipesaukee and Merrimack rivers and several brooks powered early sawmills and gristmills. By the 1770s there was a substantial population in the north fields of Canterbury.

By 1780 the residents of the north fields found it increasingly difficult to travel to the center of Canterbury to attend to town business. On March 30, 1780, they filed the following petition with the state of New Hampshire (spelling left as printed in 1780):

Canterbury, March 30, 1780
"The humble petition of ye Subscribers Inhabitants of ye North part of sd Canterbury to ye Honorable ye President and members of Council and house of Representatives of said State. We your Humble Petitioners Living at a great Distance from ye Center of the Towne Some of us nine or ten Miles and Consequently at a very great disadvantage in joining with them all Publick Town affairs, being encouraged Partly by our Living in that Part of ye Town that was Laid out for what was called ye upper Parish and Partly by ye Kind Reception our Request met with which we made to ye Town for a dismission but more particularly by our Confidence in your Honors desire to Promote ye Happiness of every Part of ye State Humbly Pray that Honors would take our Case into your Serious Consideration and grant that we together with all those Live in sd Upper Part may be Erected and Incorporated into a body Politick and Corporate to have Continuance in ye Name of Northfield with all such Powers and Authorities Privileges Immunities and Franchises with other Parishes or Towns in this State in General hold Enjoy with your Petitions as in duty bound Shall forever pray."

The petition, signed by 43 residents, was approved by the state legislature, and the Town of Northfield was born.

There was a border adjustment to Merrimack and Strafford Counties on December 24, 1828, that affected Northfield and Tilton.

In 1848, the Boston, Concord and Montreal Railroad opened to Northfield, helping it develop symbiotically with Tilton across the river as a mill town. The Winnipesaukee River provided water power for mills, and by 1859, when the population was 1,332, Northfield had a woolen factory and a wrapping paper mill.

Northfield continued to combine a strong industrial base with a healthy agricultural community throughout the 19th and most of the 20th centuries. Early sawmills and gristmills gave way to large textile and paper mills. As these industries died out in the area, many old mill buildings were torn down. Others were used for the manufacture of other items, including optical lenses and lead batteries.

== Geography ==
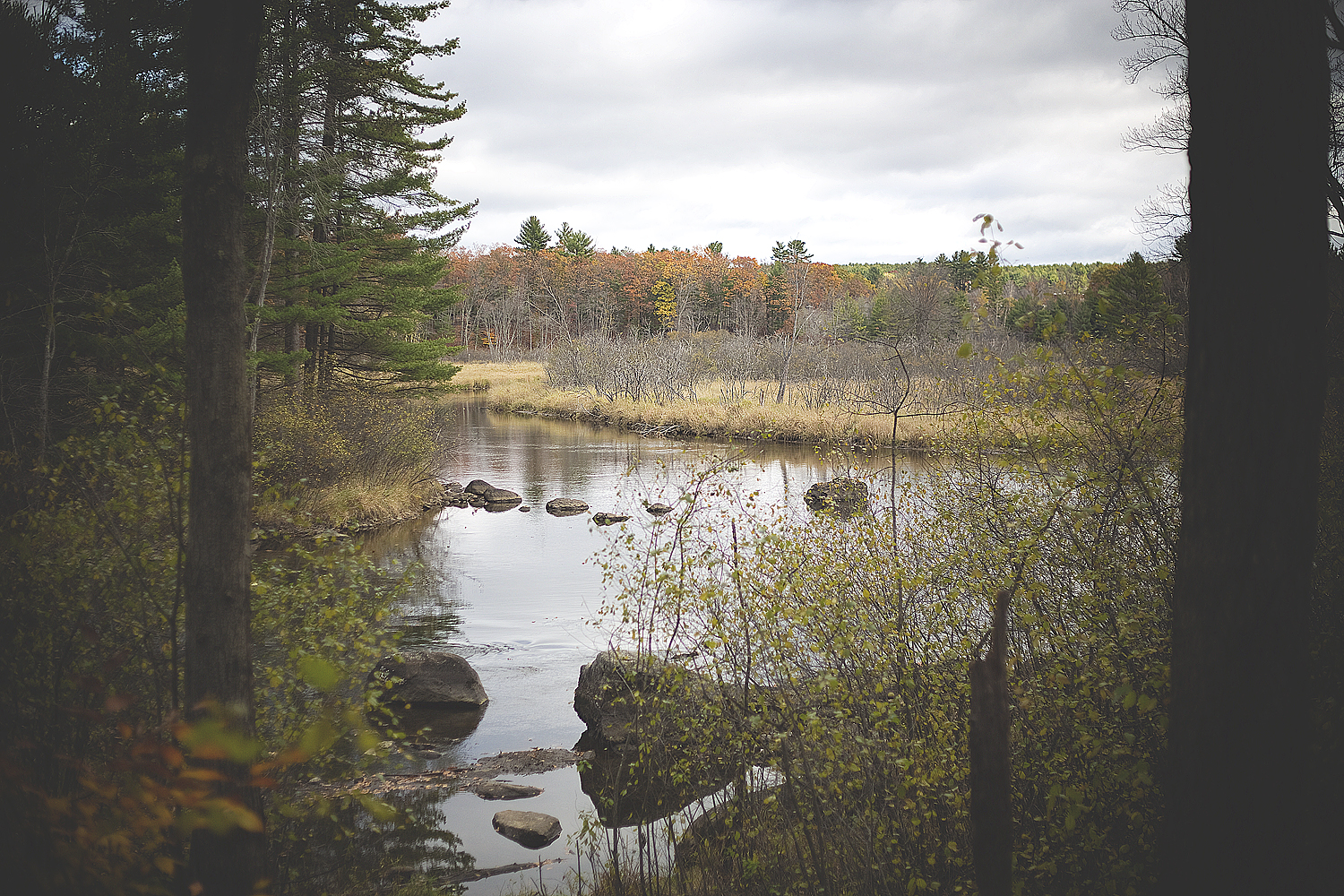
View from the Winnipesaukee River Trail

According to the United States Census Bureau, the town has a total area of 28.9 square miles (74.8 km^{2}), of which 28.5 square miles (73.8 km^{2}) are land and 0.39 square miles (1.0 km^{2}) is water, comprising 1.27% of the town. It is drained by the Merrimack River, primarily by way of the Winnipesaukee River and its tributary Williams Brook. The Winnipesaukee River forms the northern boundary of the town, separating it from Tilton to the north. The town is characterized by gently rolling hills, the highest point in town being the summit of Bean Hill at 1,500 feet (460 m) above sea level, near the southern border. Two significant water bodies in Northfield are Sandogardy Pond in the southwest corner of town and Knowles Pond on the east side of town.

The village of Northfield is located in the northern part of the town on the south bank of the Winnipesaukee River. Directly across the river is the village of Tilton in Belknap County. The two villages together comprise the Tilton Northfield census-designated place.

=== Adjacent municipalities ===
- Tilton (north)
- Belmont (northeast)
- Gilmanton (east)
- Canterbury (south)
- Boscawen (southwest)
- Franklin (west)

== Economy ==
Today Northfield is the home of more than 70 large and small businesses. Its proximity to the robust commercial development in nearby Tilton has precluded the development of a strong commercial base in Northfield, but development in other sectors have provided Northfield with a strong and diverse economy. Manufacturers including Eptam Plastics, Blouin Steel Fabricators, Freudenberg NOK, and PCC Structurals form the backbone of the town's manufacturing/industrial base. The service sector employs more than 400 people and constitutes 40% of the overall workforce.

Although many of the town's residents travel to nearby commercial and business centers in Tilton, Concord or Manchester for employment, nearly a thousand people work in Northfield, according to the NH Economic and Labor Market Information Bureau.

Highland Mountain Bike Park is in the southern part of the town.

== Transportation ==
Northfield is located in central New Hampshire and is served by several state and federal transportation routes. Interstate 93 runs through Northfield and serves the town with one partial exit and one nearby exit. Exit 19, closest to the center of town, allows for entry onto the southbound lanes of I-93 and exit from the northbound lanes. A full I-93 interchange, exit 20, is located less than a mile north of Northfield, in the neighboring town of Tilton.

Northfield is also crossed by New Hampshire Route 132, which provides north–south local access parallel to Interstate 93. New Hampshire Route 140 runs east–west and crosses the northern tip of town, connecting Tilton with Belmont, Gilmanton, and Alton. The combined U.S. Route 3/NH Route 11 run east–west through Tilton, just north of the town line with Northfield.

Manchester-Boston Regional Airport is the nearest major airport, located 40 miles (64 km) to the south.

Distances to area cities:

- Concord – 17 miles (27 km)
- Manchester – 34 miles (55 km)
- Boston, Massachusetts – 85 miles (137 km)
- New York, New York – 290 miles (470 km)
- Montreal, Quebec – 236 miles (380 km)

== Education ==
Northfield is a member of the Winnisquam Regional School District. Elementary education is provided at Southwick School, located in Northfield. Winnisquam Regional Middle School and Winnisquam Regional High School are located in the adjacent town of Tilton. Along with Tilton, Northfield is home to the facilities of the Tilton School, an independent college-preparatory school serving grades 9–12. Northfield is also home to Spaulding Youth Center, a provider of educational, residential, therapeutic and foster care programs and services for children and youth with neurological, emotional, behavioral, learning or developmental challenges, including Autism Spectrum Disorder and those who have experienced significant trauma, abuse or neglect.

== Demographics ==
Historical population
| Census | Pop. | Note | %± |
|---|---|---|---|
| 1790 | 606 | | — |
| 1800 | 925 | | 52.6% |
| 1810 | 1,057 | | 14.3% |
| 1820 | 1,304 | | 23.4% |
| 1830 | 1,169 | | −10.4% |
| 1840 | 1,413 | | 20.9% |
| 1850 | 1,332 | | −5.7% |
| 1860 | 1,051 | | −21.1% |
| 1870 | 833 | | −20.7% |
| 1880 | 918 | | 10.2% |
| 1890 | 1,115 | | 21.5% |
| 1900 | 1,227 | | 10.0% |
| 1910 | 1,474 | | 20.1% |
| 1920 | 1,522 | | 3.3% |
| 1930 | 1,336 | | −12.2% |
| 1940 | 1,543 | | 15.5% |
| 1950 | 1,561 | | 1.2% |
| 1960 | 1,784 | | 14.3% |
| 1970 | 2,193 | | 22.9% |
| 1980 | 3,051 | | 39.1% |
| 1990 | 4,263 | | 39.7% |
| 2000 | 4,548 | | 6.7% |
| 2010 | 4,829 | | 6.2% |
| 2020 | 4,872 | | 0.9% |
U.S. Decennial Census

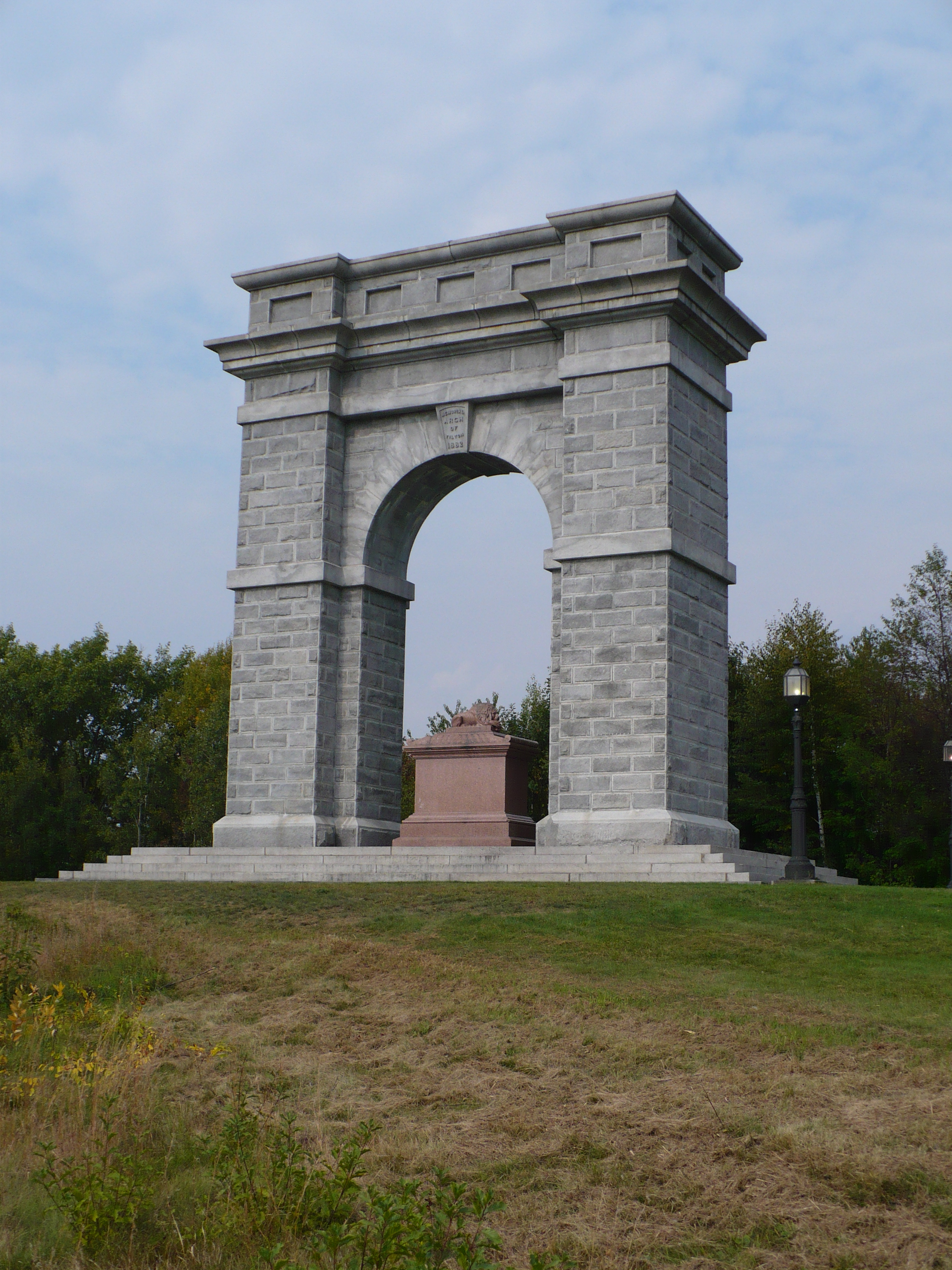
Tilton Memorial Arch (1882) in Arch Hill Park in Northfield

As of the census of 2010, there were 4,829 people, 1,843 households, and 1,309 families residing in the town. There were 1,969 housing units, of which 126, or 6.4%, were vacant. The racial makeup of the town was 96.6% white, 0.8% African American, 0.3% Native American, 0.8% Asian, 0.0% Native Hawaiian or Pacific Islander, 0.2% some other race, and 1.3% from two or more races. 1.4% of the population were Hispanic or Latino of any race.

Of the 1,843 households, 36.2% had children under the age of 18 living with them, 52.9% were headed by married couples living together, 12.7% had a female householder with no husband present, and 29.0% were non-families. 20.7% of all households were made up of individuals, and 5.7% were someone living alone who was 65 years of age or older. The average household size was 2.60, and the average family size was 2.98.

In the town, 24.6% of the population were under the age of 18, 8.1% were from 18 to 24, 26.3% from 25 to 44, 31.9% from 45 to 64, and 9.1% were 65 years of age or older. The median age was 39.2 years. For every 100 females, there were 97.7 males. For every 100 females age 18 and over, there were 95.0 males.

For the period 2011–2015, the estimated median annual income for a household was $65,536, and the median income for a family was $72,138. Male full-time workers had a median income of $51,056 versus $40,184 for females. The per capita income for the town was $28,007. 6.7% of the population and 5.4% of families were below the poverty line. 12.9% of the population under the age of 18 and 1.3% of those 65 or older were living in poverty.

== Notable people ==
- Joseph Libbey Folsom (1817–1855), US Army officer; founder of what is now Folsom, California
- Shiloh Hill (1999–), WWE wrestler
- Richard S. Molony (1811–1891), US congressman
- Robert Smith (1802–1867), US congressman
