= Belmont, New Hampshire =

- Town
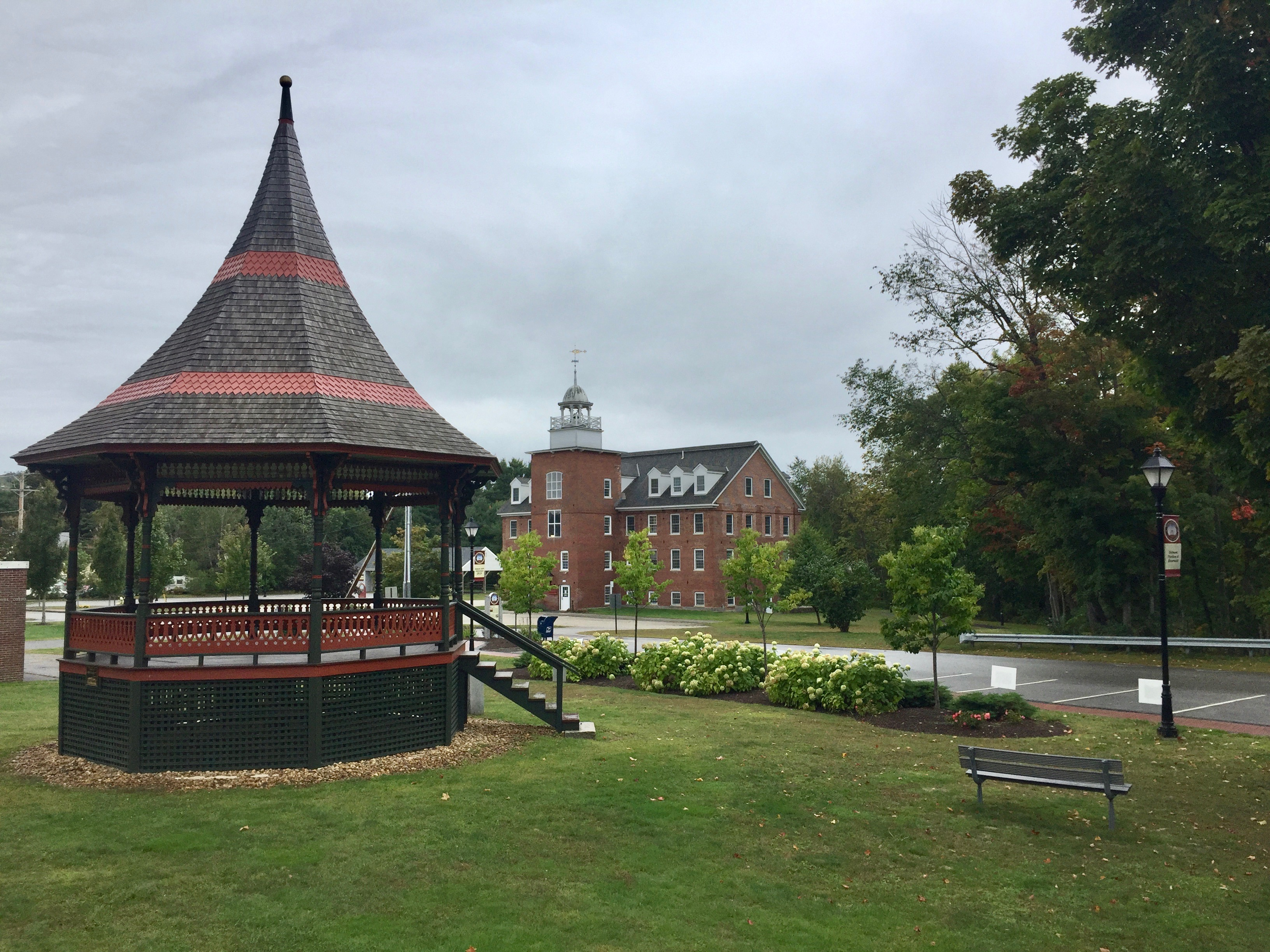
- Village Bandstand and Belmont Mill in 2019

- Seal

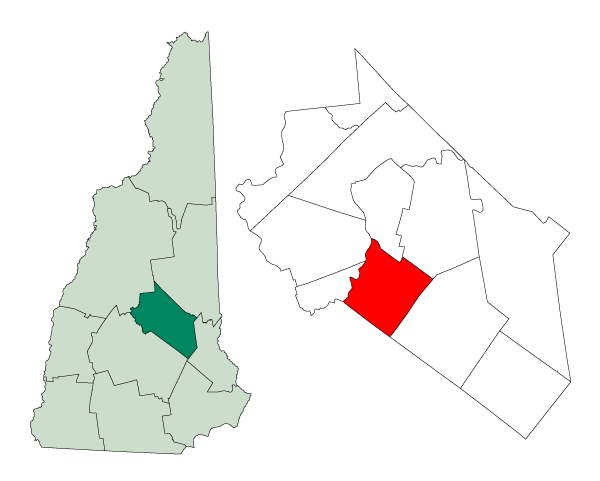
- Location in Belknap County, New Hampshire
- Coordinates: 43°26′43″N 71°28′40″W
- Country: United States
- State: New Hampshire
- County: Belknap
- Incorporated: 1859
- Villages: Belmont; Lochmere; Winnisquam

Area
  - Total: 31.9 sq mi (82.6 km^{2})
  - Land: 30.0 sq mi (77.6 km^{2})
  - Water: 1.9 sq mi (5.0 km^{2}) 6.08%
- Elevation: 761 ft (232 m)

Population (2020)
  - Total: 7,314
  - Density: 244/sq mi (94.3/km^{2})
- Time zone: UTC-5 (Eastern)
  - Summer (DST): UTC-4 (Eastern)
- ZIP code: 03220
- Area code: 603
- FIPS code: 33-04740
- GNIS feature ID: 873542
- Website: belmontnh.gov

Belmont is a town in Belknap County, New Hampshire, United States. The population was 7,314 at the 2020 census, and an estimated 7,408 in 2025, slightly up from the 2020 census.

The primary settlement in town, where 1,285 people resided at the 2020 census, is defined by the U.S. Census Bureau as the Belmont census-designated place (CDP) and includes the densely populated portion of the town near the intersection of New Hampshire routes 106 and 140.

== History ==
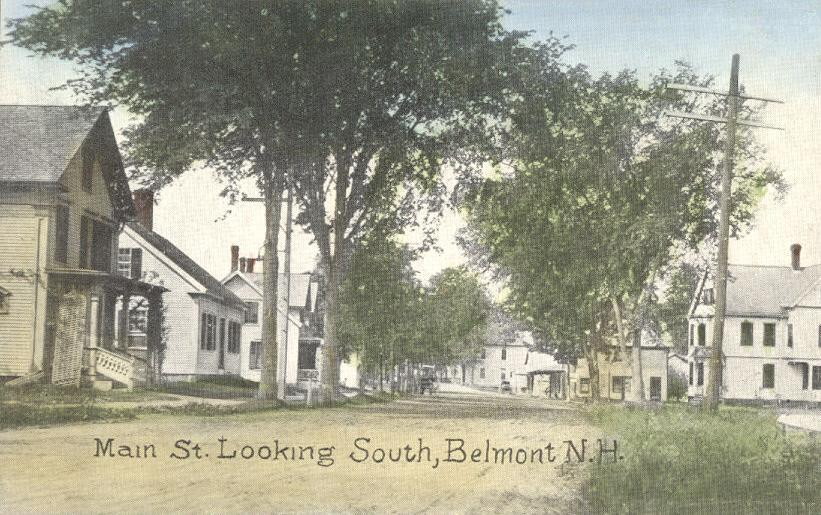
Main Street in 1908

Originally known as "Upper Gilmanton", Belmont was chartered in 1727 as a parish of Gilmanton. With water power from the Tioga River, it developed as a mill town. Built in 1833, the Gilmanton Village Manufacturing Co. made cotton and woolen textiles. Over the years it would change owners, names and products. In 1921, it was the Belmont Hosiery Co., a maker of silk, lisle and woolen stockings. It went out of business in 1955, and the renovated mill building is now a community center.

Separated from Gilmanton by an act of legislature, the town was incorporated on June 28, 1859, as Upper Gilmanton. The name Belmont was adopted in 1869 to honor August Belmont, a wealthy financier who (it was hoped) would contribute to the nascent town, but he never acknowledged the act.

In 1874, the Boston, Concord and Montreal Railroad passed through the northwestern section of Belmont, and service by the Franklin and Rochester Railroad was being planned.

The 1996–1998 adaptive reuse Belmont Mill project, federally funded through Community Development Block Grants, a major private donation, and taxpayer support, has been distinguished by regional, statewide and national awards for architectural and preservation excellence. The Belmont Mill story is featured on a New Hampshire historical marker (number 235) on nearby New Hampshire Route 140, and was cited in 2012 by the New Hampshire Preservation Alliance as one of the 25 milestone efforts of a quarter-century. The mill was added to the New Hampshire Register of Historic Places in 2014, joining the 1792 Province Road Meeting House on New Hampshire Route 107, listed since 2003. Other significant historic structures in the town include the Belmont Public Library, included on the National Register of Historic Places in 1985, and the Bandstand, cited for outstanding restoration and rehabilitation in 2015 with the Elizabeth Durfee Hengen Award from the New Hampshire Preservation Alliance.

== Geography ==
According to the United States Census Bureau, the town has a total area of 31.9 square miles (82.6 km^{2}), of which 30.0 square miles (77.6 km^{2}) are land and 1.9 square miles (5.0 km^{2}) are water, comprising 6.08% of the town. The highest point in Belmont is Cotton Hill, a 1,360-foot (410 m) summit near the town's northern border. Drained by the Tioga River, Belmont lies fully within the Merrimack River watershed.

New Hampshire Route 106 passes through the town center, connecting Laconia to the north with Loudon and Concord to the south. New Hampshire Route 140 crosses NH 106 at the town center, leading to Gilmanton and Alton to the east and Tilton to the west. U.S. Route 3 and New Hampshire Route 11, forming a concurrency, pass through the northwest corner of the town along the shore of Lake Winnisquam, leading north to Laconia and southwest to Tilton and Franklin. New Hampshire Route 107 crosses the northeastern corner of the town, connecting Gilmanton to the south with Laconia to the north.

=== Adjacent municipalities ===
- Laconia (north)
- Gilford (northeast)
- Gilmanton (east)
- Northfield (south)
- Tilton (west)
- Sanbornton (northwest)

== Demographics ==
Historical population
Census	Pop.	Note	%±
1860	1,189		—
1870	1,165		−2.0%
1880	1,226		5.2%
1890	1,142		−6.9%
1900	1,294		13.3%
1910	1,390		7.4%
1920	1,194		−14.1%
1930	1,299		8.8%
1940	1,374		5.8%
1950	1,611		17.2%
1960	1,953		21.2%
1970	2,493		27.6%
1980	4,026		61.5%
1990	5,796		44.0%
2000	6,716		15.9%
2010	7,356		9.5%
2020	7,314		−0.6%
2024 (est.)	7,428	▲	1.6%
U.S. Decennial Census

As of the 2010 census, there were 7,356 people, 2,941 households, and 2,069 families residing in the town. There were 3,615 housing units, of which 674, or 18.6%, were vacant. 495 of the vacant units were for seasonal use. The racial makeup of the town was 97.0% White, 0.4% African American, 0.1% Native American, 0.7% Asian, 0.04% Native Hawaiian or Pacific Islander, 0.3% some other race, and 1.4% from two or more races. 1.3% of the population were Hispanic or Latino of any race.

Of the 2,941 households, 31.6% had children under the age of 18 living with them, 53.0% were headed by married couples living together, 11.1% had a female householder with no husband present, and 29.6% were non-families. 21.9% of all households were made up of individuals, and 8.6% were someone living alone who was 65 years of age or older. The average household size was 2.50, and the average family size was 2.87.

In the town, 21.8% of the population were under the age of 18, 7.6% were from 18 to 24, 24.9% from 25 to 44, 32.4% from 45 to 64, and 13.5% were 65 years of age or older. The median age was 42.1 years. For every 100 females, there were 97.8 males. For every 100 females age 18 and over, there were 94.8 males.

For the period 2011–2015, the estimated median annual income for a household was $65,150, and the median income for a family was $72,539. Male full-time workers had a median income of $45,625 versus $38,147 for females. The per capita income for the town was $27,113. 7.9% of the population and 4.7% of families were below the poverty line. 10.5% of the population under the age of 18 and 5.4% of those 65 or older were living in poverty.

== Government ==
In the New Hampshire Senate, Belmont is in the 7th district, represented by Republican Harold French. In the New Hampshire House of Representatives, district 6, Belmont is represented by Republicans Michael J. Sylvia and John R. Plumer. On the New Hampshire Executive Council, Belmont is in the 2nd district, represented by Democrat Andru Volinsky. In the United States House of Representatives, Belmont is in New Hampshire's 1st congressional district, represented by Democrat Chris Pappas.

== Notable people ==
- William Badger (1779–1852), 15th governor of New Hampshire
- Richard Paul Pavlick (1887–1975), would-be assassin of president-elect John F. Kennedy in December 1960
