= Winnisquam, New Hampshire =

Unincorporated community in New Hampshire, United States

- Unincorporated community
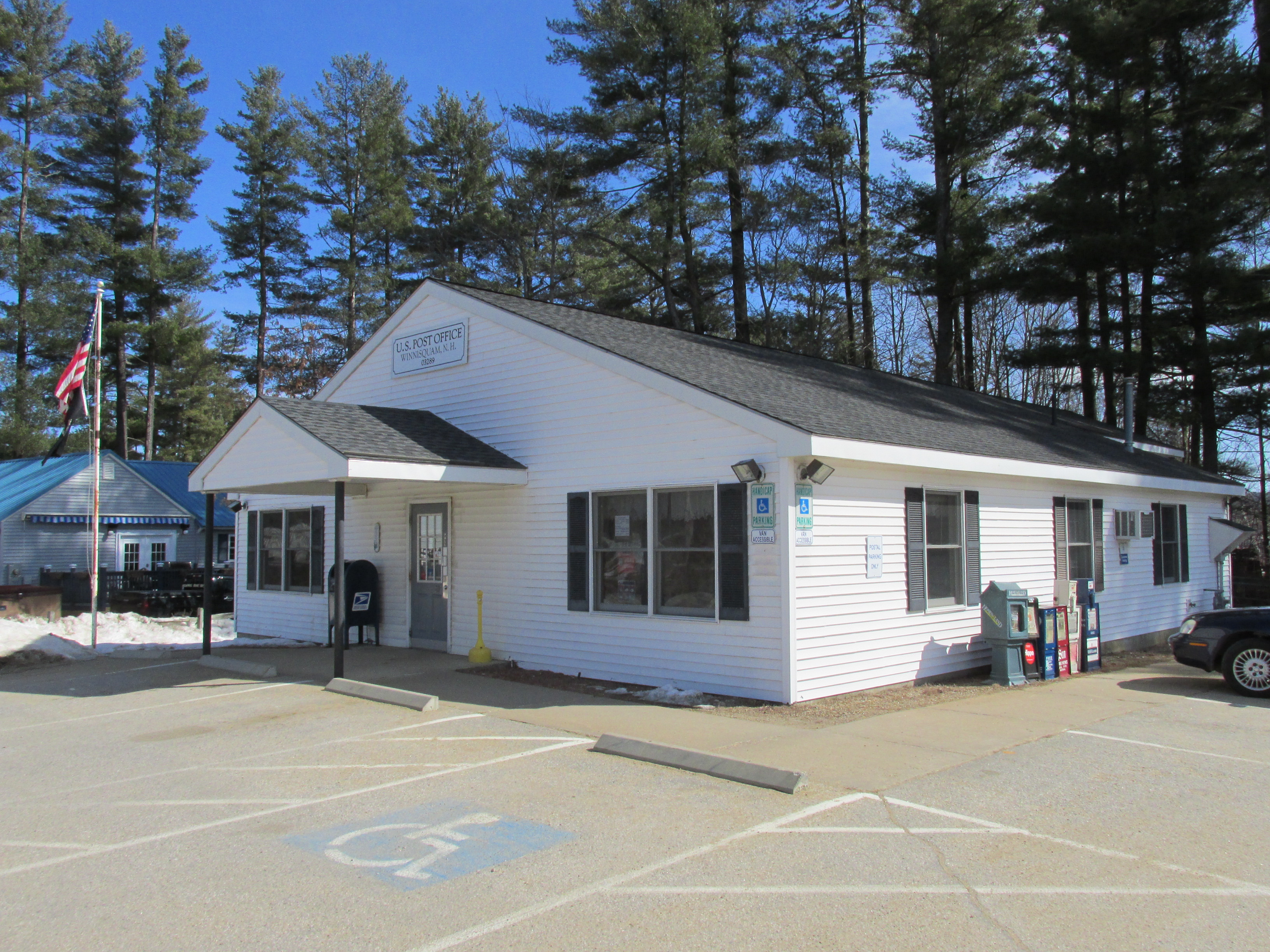
- Winnisquam Post Office

- Location within New Hampshire Location within the United States
- Coordinates: 43°30′05″N 71°30′43″W
- Country: United States
- State: New Hampshire
- County: Belknap
- Towns: Belmont, Sanbornton, Tilton
- Elevation: 482 ft (147 m)
- Time zone: UTC-5 (Eastern (EST))
  - Summer (DST): UTC-4 (EDT)
- ZIP code: 03289
- Area code: 603
- GNIS feature ID: 870959

Winnisquam is an unincorporated community in the Lakes Region in Belknap County, New Hampshire, United States. The village is located at 43°30′07″N 71°30′46″W, around the U.S. Route 3 bridge over the narrows of Lake Winnisquam, and covers portions of three towns: Belmont, Sanbornton, and Tilton.

Winnisquam has a ZIP code of 03289, different from the ZIP codes in each of its component towns.

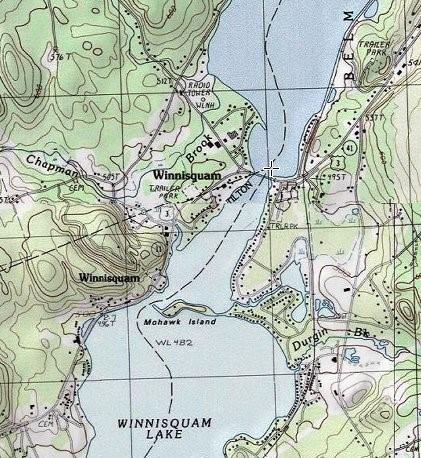
USGS detail map of village of Winnisquam
