= Belknap County, New Hampshire =

County in New Hampshire, United States

- County
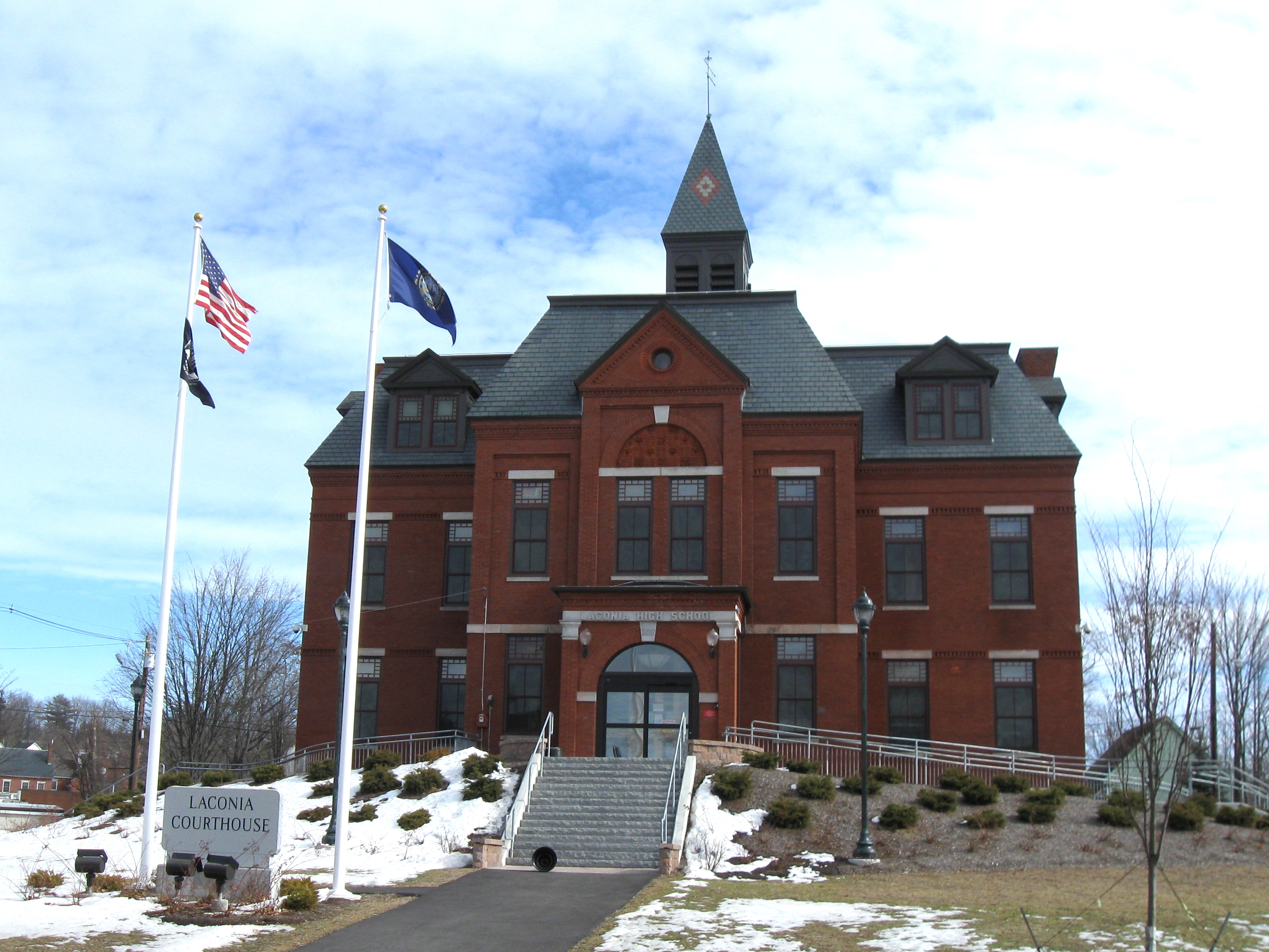
- Laconia District Court on Academy Square in Laconia

- Seal

- Location within the U.S. state of New Hampshire
- Coordinates: 43°30′55″N 71°26′10″W
- Country: United States
- State: New Hampshire
- Founded: 1840
- Named for: Jeremy Belknap
- Seat: Laconia
- Largest city: Laconia

Area
  - Total: 470.0 sq mi (1,217 km^{2})
  - Land: 401.8 sq mi (1,041 km^{2})
  - Water: 68.2 sq mi (177 km^{2}) 14.5%

Population (2020)
  - Total: 63,705
  - Estimate (2025): 65,147 ▲
  - Density: 158.5/sq mi (61.2/km^{2})
- Time zone: UTC−5 (Eastern)
  - Summer (DST): UTC−4 (EDT)
- Congressional districts: 1st, 2nd
- Website: www.belknapcounty.gov

Belknap County (/ˈbɛlnæp/) is a county in the U.S. state of New Hampshire. As of the 2020 census, the population was 63,705. The county seat is Laconia. It is located in New Hampshire's Lakes Region, slightly southeast of the state's geographic center. Belknap County comprises the Laconia, NH Micropolitan Statistical Area, which in turn constitutes a portion of the Boston-Worcester-Providence, MA-RI-NH-CT Combined Statistical Area.

The southwestern half of Lake Winnipesaukee lies in Belknap County, while several other major lakes such as Squam Lake and Lake Winnisquam lie partially or wholly within the county. The Belknap Mountains lie along the shore of Winnipesaukee east of Laconia and feature Mount Major, known for its numerous hiking trails and Gunstock Mountain, home of a popular ski resort. Bank of New Hampshire Pavilion is a concert venue in Gilford which features major national touring music acts, while the Laconia Motorcycle Week attracts hundreds of thousands of visitors every June. Funspot Family Fun Center, located in Weirs Beach, is the largest video game arcade in the world.

== History ==
Belknap County was organized in 1840 by removing parts of northeastern Merrimack County and northwestern Strafford County. It is named for Dr. Jeremy Belknap, a renowned preacher, historian, and author of The History of New Hampshire. The first County Court was held within the town of Meredith, at a village known as Meredith Bridge on the Winnipesaukee River. In 1855, the town of Laconia was separated from Meredith.

== Geography ==
According to the U.S. Census Bureau, the county has a total area of 469 square miles (1,210 km^{2}), of which 400 square miles (1,000 km^{2}) are land and 68 square miles (180 km^{2}) (15%) are water. It is the second-smallest county in New Hampshire by area. Most of the county's water area is part of Lake Winnipesaukee.

=== Adjacent counties ===
- Carroll County (north)
- Strafford County (east)
- Merrimack County (southwest)
- Grafton County (northwest)

== Demographics ==
Historical population
Census	Pop.	Note	%±
1850	17,721		—
1860	18,549		4.7%
1870	17,681		−4.7%
1880	17,948		1.5%
1890	20,321		13.2%
1900	19,526		−3.9%
1910	21,309		9.1%
1920	21,178		−0.6%
1930	22,623		6.8%
1940	24,328		7.5%
1950	26,632		9.5%
1960	28,912		8.6%
1970	32,367		12.0%
1980	42,884		32.5%
1990	49,216		14.8%
2000	56,325		14.4%
2010	60,088		6.7%
2020	63,705		6.0%
2025 (est.)	65,147	▲	2.3%
U.S. Decennial Census; 1790-1960 1900-1990; 1990-2000

=== 2020 census ===
As of the 2020 census, the county had a population of 63,705. The median age was 49.3 years. 17.7% of residents were under the age of 18 and 24.3% of residents were 65 years of age or older. For every 100 females there were 98.0 males, and for every 100 females age 18 and over there were 96.3 males age 18 and over.

The racial makeup of the county was 92.8% White, 0.6% Black or African American, 0.2% American Indian and Alaska Native, 0.9% Asian, 0.0% Native Hawaiian and Pacific Islander, 0.6% from some other race, and 4.9% from two or more races. Hispanic or Latino residents of any race comprised 2.0% of the population.

45.5% of residents lived in urban areas, while 54.5% lived in rural areas.

There were 27,027 households in the county, of which 23.7% had children under the age of 18 living with them and 23.4% had a female householder with no spouse or partner present. About 27.4% of all households were made up of individuals and 13.4% had someone living alone who was 65 years of age or older.

There were 38,252 housing units, of which 29.3% were vacant. Among occupied housing units, 75.3% were owner-occupied and 24.7% were renter-occupied. The homeowner vacancy rate was 1.1% and the rental vacancy rate was 6.0%.

Belknap County, New Hampshire – Racial and ethnic composition Note: the US Census treats Hispanic/Latino as an ethnic category. This table excludes Latinos from the racial categories and assigns them to a separate category. Hispanics/Latinos may be of any race.
Race / Ethnicity (NH = Non-Hispanic)	Pop 2000	Pop 2010	Pop 2020	% 2000	% 2010	% 2020
White alone (NH)	54,685	57,553	58,714	97.08%	95.78%	92.16%
Black or African American alone (NH)	151	261	324	0.26%	0.43%	0.50%
Native American or Alaska Native alone (NH)	164	119	122	0.29%	0.19%	0.19%
Asian alone (NH)	306	695	582	0.54%	1.15%	0.91%
Pacific Islander alone (NH)	8	9	11	0.01%	0.01%	0.01%
Other race alone (NH)	30	30	188	0.05%	0.04%	0.29%
Mixed race or Multiracial (NH)	563	697	2,503	0.99%	1.15%	3.92%
Hispanic or Latino (any race)	418	724	1,261	0.74%	1.20%	1.97%
Total	56,325	60,088	63,705	100.00%	100.00%	100.00%

=== 2010 census ===
As of the 2010 United States census, there were 60,088 people, 24,766 households, and 16,609 families living in the county. The population density was 150.1 inhabitants per square mile (58.0/km^{2}). There were 37,386 housing units at an average density of 93.4 per square mile (36.1/km^{2}). The racial makeup of the county was 96.6% white, 1.2% Asian, 0.5% black or African American, 0.2% American Indian, 0.2% from other races, and 1.3% from two or more races. Those of Hispanic or Latino origin made up 1.2% of the population. In terms of ancestry, 20.8% were English, 20.7% were Irish, 8.5% were Italian, 8.0% were German, 7.1% were French Canadian, and 6.6% were American.

Of the 24,766 households, 28.5% had children under the age of 18 living with them, 52.5% were married couples living together, 9.8% had a female householder with no husband present, 32.9% were non-families, and 25.7% of all households were made up of individuals. The average household size was 2.39 and the average family size was 2.84. The median age was 44.7 years.

The median income for a household in the county was $54,929 and the median income for a family was $64,875. Males had a median income of $46,378 versus $34,690 for females. The per capita income for the county was $28,517. About 5.2% of families and 8.6% of the population were below the poverty line, including 8.7% of those under age 18 and 10.0% of those age 65 or over.

=== 2000 census ===
As of the census of 2000, there were 56,325 people, 22,459 households, and 15,496 families living in the county. The population density was 140 inhabitants per square mile (54/km^{2}). There were 32,121 housing units at an average density of 80 units per square mile (31/km^{2}). The racial makeup of the county was 97.61% White, 0.29% Black or African American, 0.30% Native American, 0.55% Asian, 0.02% Pacific Islander, 0.16% from other races, and 1.06% from two or more races. 0.74% of the population were Hispanic or Latino of any race. 17.2% were of English, 13.6% Irish, 13.3% French, 12.2% French Canadian, 8.5% American, 6.9% Italian and 5.7% German ancestry. 95.0% spoke English, 2.7% French and 1.2% Spanish as their first language.

There were 22,459 households, out of which 30.4% had children under the age of 18 living with them, 55.7% were married couples living together, 9.20% had a female householder with no husband present, and 3% were non-families. 24.40% of all households were made up of individuals, and 9.70% had someone living alone who was 65 years of age or older. The average household size was 2.45 and the average family size was 2.91.

In the county, the population was spread out, with 23.60% under the age of 18, 6.70% from 18 to 24, 28.10% from 25 to 44, 26.40% from 45 to 64, and 15.10% who were 65 years of age or older. The median age was 40 years. For every 100 females, there were 97.10 males. For every 100 females age 18 and over, there were 95.10 males.

The median income for a household in the county was $43,605, and the median income for a family was $50,510. Males had a median income of $34,741 versus $25,445 for females. The per capita income for the county was $22,758. About 4.50% of families and 6.10% of the population were below the poverty line, including 7.60% of those under age 18 and 4.90% of those age 65 or over.

== Politics and government ==
Belknap County has become the most Republican county in New Hampshire: the Republican Party is the majority political party in the county, holding 17 of 18 seats in the General Court as of December 2024. Since 1888, only three Democrats have won Belknap County: Woodrow Wilson in 1912 when the Republican Party was mortally divided between William Howard Taft and Theodore Roosevelt; 1964, when Lyndon B. Johnson swept the Northeast due to Republican Barry Goldwater's conservative views regarding the Civil Rights Movement; and 2008, when Barack Obama swept every county in New England bar one. In 2020, Senator Jeanne Shaheen became the first Democrat to win Belknap County in a Senate race in over 50 years.

United States presidential election results for Belknap County, New Hampshire
Year	Republican		Democratic		Third party(ies)	
Year	No.	%	No.	%	No.	%
1876	2,028	46.71%	2,308	53.16%	6	0.14%
1880	2,350	47.81%	2,483	50.52%	82	1.67%
1884	2,368	48.57%	2,381	48.84%	126	2.58%
1888	2,687	50.35%	2,537	47.54%	113	2.12%
1892	2,663	50.56%	2,472	46.93%	132	2.51%
1896	3,465	72.67%	978	20.51%	325	6.82%
1900	3,099	61.32%	1,819	35.99%	136	2.69%
1904	2,867	60.31%	1,761	37.04%	126	2.65%
1908	2,916	61.07%	1,692	35.43%	167	3.50%
1912	1,741	36.82%	1,862	39.38%	1,125	23.79%
1916	2,579	51.57%	2,310	46.19%	112	2.24%
1920	5,628	61.74%	3,464	38.00%	23	0.25%
1924	5,996	63.79%	3,217	34.23%	186	1.98%
1928	6,762	64.63%	3,689	35.26%	11	0.11%
1932	6,048	55.04%	4,911	44.69%	29	0.26%
1936	6,219	53.98%	5,150	44.70%	153	1.33%
1940	6,115	51.96%	5,653	48.04%	0	0.00%
1944	6,188	53.74%	5,325	46.24%	2	0.02%
1948	7,152	64.79%	3,822	34.62%	65	0.59%
1952	9,567	71.81%	3,755	28.19%	0	0.00%
1956	9,902	75.95%	3,131	24.01%	5	0.04%
1960	9,156	61.92%	5,630	38.08%	0	0.00%
1964	5,908	42.41%	8,024	57.59%	0	0.00%
1968	8,642	61.42%	4,942	35.12%	487	3.46%
1972	11,536	70.72%	4,610	28.26%	166	1.02%
1976	9,876	60.78%	6,143	37.81%	230	1.42%
1980	12,077	65.12%	4,365	23.54%	2,104	11.34%
1984	14,200	74.63%	4,743	24.93%	84	0.44%
1988	14,454	67.92%	6,603	31.03%	223	1.05%
1992	10,578	42.16%	8,405	33.50%	6,107	24.34%
1996	10,685	45.24%	10,345	43.81%	2,586	10.95%
2000	14,799	55.23%	10,719	40.00%	1,277	4.77%
2004	17,920	55.48%	14,080	43.59%	298	0.92%
2008	16,402	48.80%	16,796	49.97%	416	1.24%
2012	17,571	51.85%	15,890	46.89%	426	1.26%
2016	19,315	55.11%	13,517	38.57%	2,213	6.31%
2020	20,899	54.31%	16,894	43.90%	686	1.78%
2024	22,765	55.92%	17,469	42.91%	474	1.16%

=== County Commission ===
The executive power of Belknap County's government is held by three county commissioners, each representing one of the three commissioner districts within the county.

District	Commissioner	Hometown	Party
1	Peter Spanos (chair)	Winnisquam	Republican
2	Glen Waring (Vice Chair)	Gilmanton	Republican
3	Stephen Hodges (Clerk)	Gilford	Republican

In addition to the County Commission, there are five directly elected officials: they include County Attorney, Register of Deeds, County Sheriff, Register of Probate, and County Treasurer.

Office	Name
County Attorney	Keith Cormier (D)
Register of Deeds	Judith McGrath (R)
County Sheriff	William Wright (R)
Register of Probate	Alan Glassman (R)
County Treasurer	Michael Muzzey (R)

=== General court ===
The legislative branch of Belknap County is made up of all of the members of the New Hampshire House of Representatives from the county. In total, there are 18 members from nine different districts. After the 2022 elections, the party distribution and representatives were as follows.

Affiliation	Members	Voting share
Democratic Party	3	16.7%
Republican Party	15	83.3%
Total	18	100%

== Communities ==
There are ten towns and one city in Belknap County.

=== City ===
- Laconia (county seat)

=== Towns ===
- Alton
- Barnstead
- Belmont
- Center Harbor
- Gilford
- Gilmanton
- Meredith
- New Hampton
- Sanbornton
- Tilton

=== Census-designated places ===
- Alton
- Belmont
- Meredith
- New Hampton
- Tilton Northfield

=== Villages ===
- Alton Bay
- Center Barnstead
- East Tilton
- Gilmanton Ironworks
- Glendale
- Lakeport
- Lochmere
- Weirs Beach
- Winnisquam

== See also ==
- National Register of Historic Places listings in Belknap County, New Hampshire
- Rosenblatt v. Baer, a 1966 United States Supreme Court case involving an employee of Belknap County
