= Lake Winnisquam =

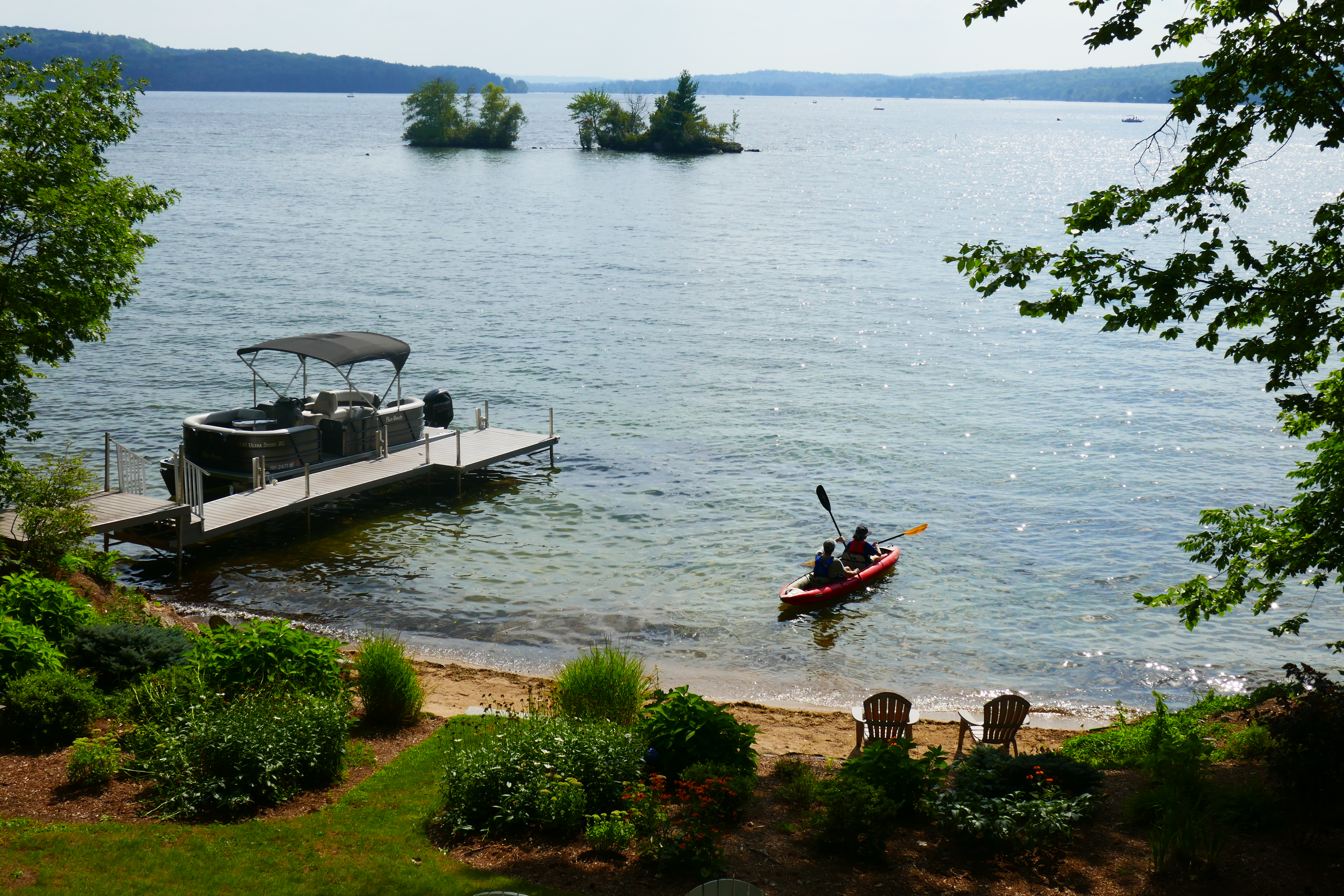
- Kayaking on the lake

- Location in the state of New Hampshire
- Location: Belknap County, New Hampshire
- Coordinates: 43°32′42″N 71°30′32″W
- Type: lake
- Primary inflows: Winnipesaukee River
- Primary outflows: Winnipesaukee River
- Basin countries: United States
- Max. length: 10.5 miles (16.9 km)
- Max. width: 1.5 miles (2.4 km)
- Surface area: 4,214 acres (17.05 km^{2})
- Max. depth: 155 feet (47 m)
- Shore length^{1}: 30 miles (48 km)
- Surface elevation: 482 feet (147 m)
- Islands: Loon Island; Three Islands; Pot Island; Hog Island; Mohawk Island
- Settlements: Meredith; Laconia; Sanbornton; Belmont; Tilton (villages of Winnisquam and Lochmere)
- ^{1} Shore length is not a well-defined measure.

Lake Winnisquam is in Belknap County in the Lakes Region of central New Hampshire, United States, in the communities of Meredith, Laconia, Sanbornton, Belmont, and Tilton. At 4,214 acres (1,705 ha), it is the fourth-largest lake entirely in New Hampshire. The lake is roughly triangular in shape, with the vertexes pointing north, east, and south. The lake lies along the path of the Winnipesaukee River, which enters the lake from its eastern corner and carries water from Lake Winnipesaukee via Paugus Bay and Opechee Bay. The river also flows south out of Winnisquam's southern corner, eventually joining the Merrimack River. The lake extends several miles north from the course of the Winnipesaukee River, which forms the lake's southeastern side, with the northern point being formed by the confluence of several smaller creeks near the village of Meredith Center. The lake has a maximum depth of 155 feet (47 m).

The lake is only a few miles from Interstate 93 via Exit 20 for U.S. Route 3 and New Hampshire Route 11. Winnisquam has two basins, a larger northern basin and a smaller southern one, with a bridge carrying Routes 3 and 11 separating them. The village of Winnisquam is at the bridge.

The Abenaki people occupied the Winnisquam and Winnipesaukee area until colonists arrived in the mid-18th century. Winnisquam's surrounding county, Belknap, was founded in 1840 and named after Jeremy Belknap, a Congregational clergyman and prominent historian.

Lake Winnisquam is home to many species of fish. Cold water species include rainbow trout, lake trout, landlocked salmon, and whitefish. The warm water species include small- and largemouth bass, pickerel, horned pout, white perch, northern pike, walleye, black crappie, bluegill, and yellow perch. Remote lake and brook trout stocking is common when authorities find it necessary.

Ahern State Park is on the eastern shore of the lake.

== Gallery ==
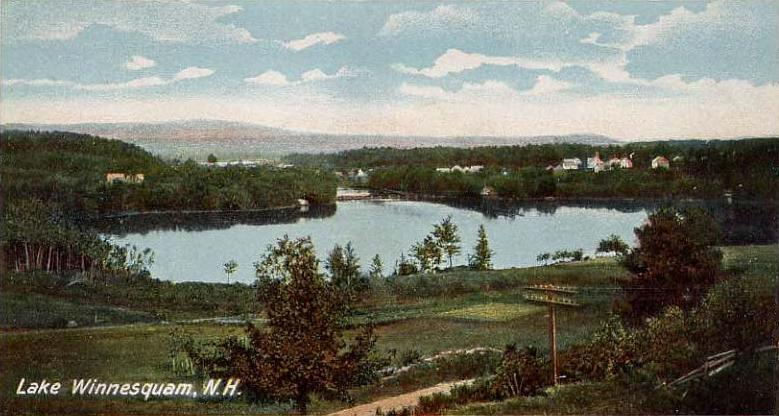
View of Lake Winnisquam c. 1905

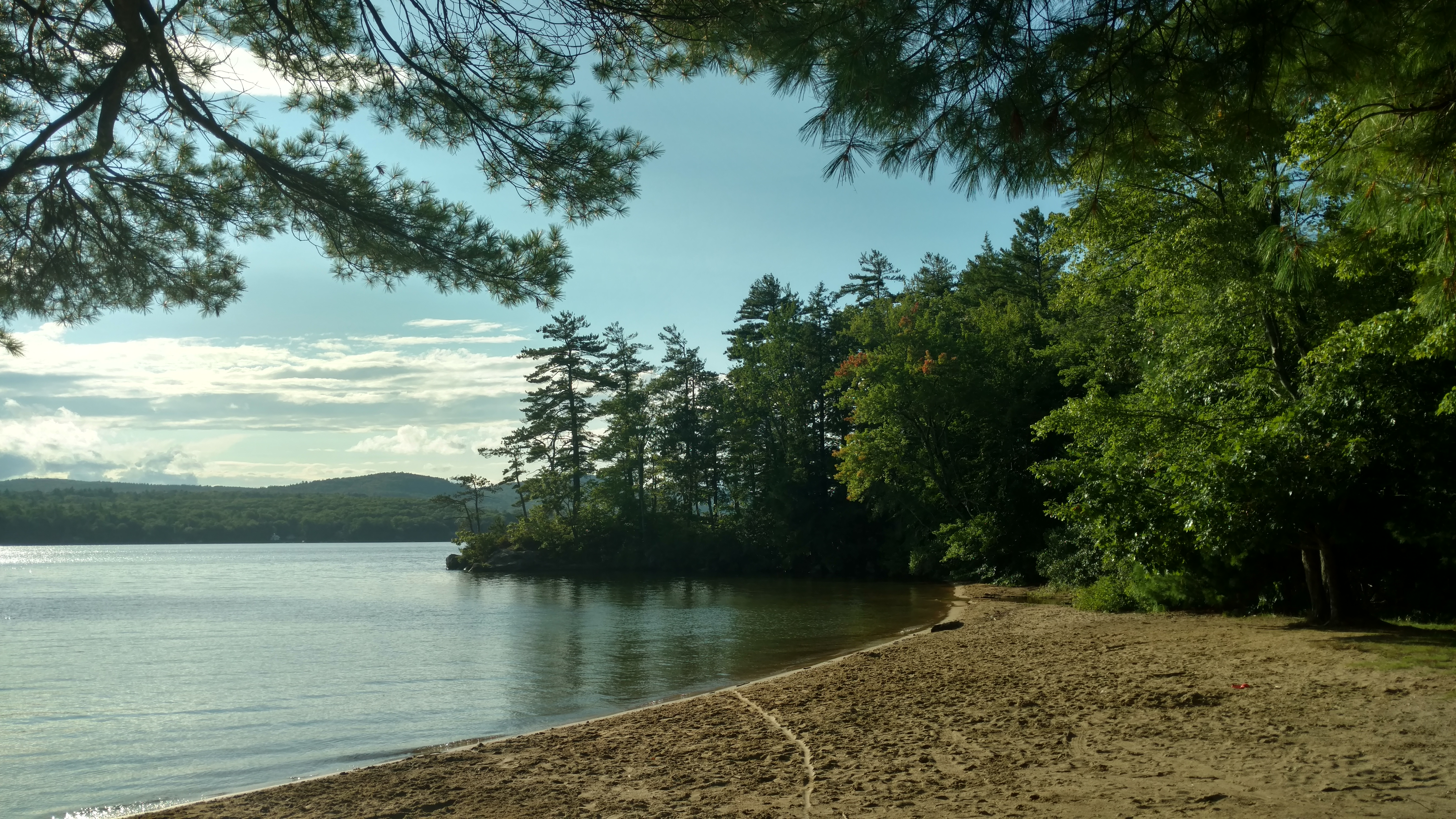
Lake Winnisquam in Ahern State Park, 2018

== See also ==
- List of lakes in New Hampshire
