= Winnipesaukee River =

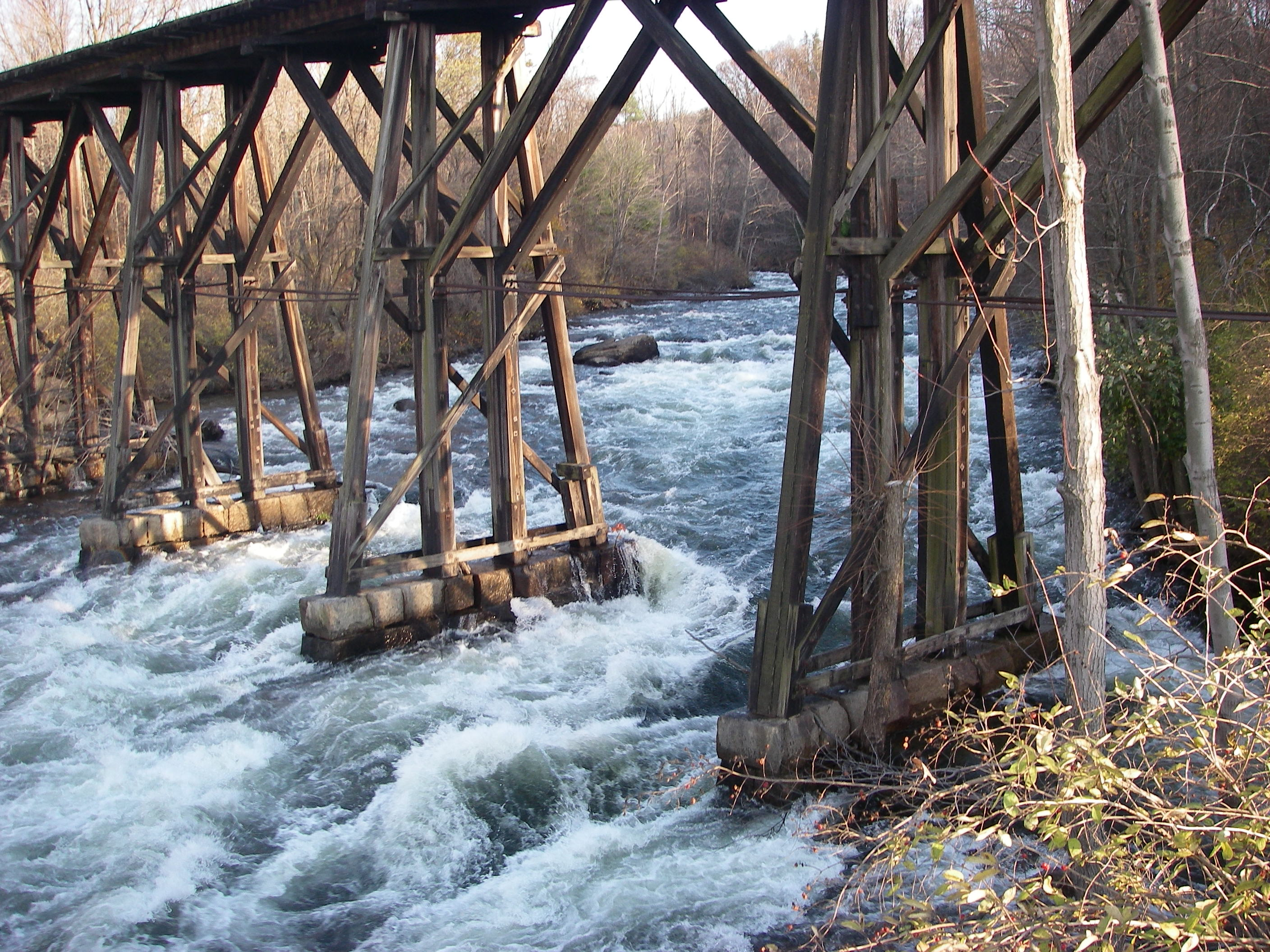
- Winnipesaukee River entering Franklin

- Location within New Hampshire Location within the United States

Location
- Country: United States
- State: New Hampshire
- Counties: Belknap, Merrimack
- Cities and towns: Laconia, Belmont, Tilton, Northfield, Franklin

Physical characteristics
- Source: Lake Winnipesaukee (Paugus Bay)
  - location: Lakeport
  - coordinates: 43°32′54″N 71°27′54″W
  - elevation: 504 ft (154 m)
- Mouth: Merrimack River
  - location: Franklin
  - coordinates: 43°26′14″N 71°38′53″W
  - elevation: 261 ft (80 m)
- Length: 10.5 miles (16.9 km)

Basin features
- Tributaries
  - left: Jewett Brook, Tioga River, Williams Brook
  - right: Winding Hill Brook, Gulf Brook, Packer Brook

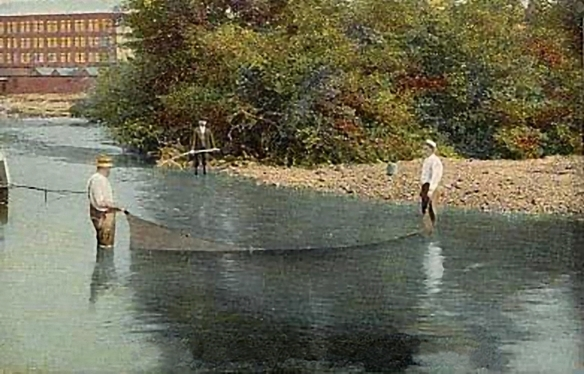
The Winnipesaukee River in 1907, Franklin, NH

The Winnipesaukee River is a 10.5-mile-long (16.9 km) river that connects Lake Winnipesaukee with the Pemigewasset and Merrimack rivers in Franklin, New Hampshire. The river is in the Lakes Region of central New Hampshire. The river's drainage area is approximately 488 square miles (1,264 km^{2}).

The river has two distinct sections. The upstream section consists of a series of river courses connecting a chain of lakes, beginning with Lake Winnipesaukee. From the dam at the outlet of Lake Winnipesaukee in the Lakeport section of Laconia, the river almost immediately enters Opechee Bay. 1 mile (1.6 km) down the lake, the river exits over a dam and drops through the center of Laconia, its banks lined by industrial buildings from the 19th century that were constructed to take advantage of the river's power. The 1-mile (1.6 km) section through Laconia ends at Lake Winnisquam, the fourth-largest lake in New Hampshire. A 5-mile (8 km) stretch across Winnisquam leads to the dam at the lake's outlet and a short descent to Silver Lake.

The river's lower section begins at the natural outlet of Silver Lake, on the boundary between Belmont and Tilton, New Hampshire. The river passes through the center of the twin towns of Tilton and Northfield, then descends through a narrow valley to Franklin where additional small dams use the river's power. From Tilton to Franklin, the river has a drop of up to 90 feet per mile (17 m/km), with challenging rapids for sport boaters who put in at Cross Mill Bridge and take out at the U.S. Route 3 Sanborn Bridge in downtown Franklin. A USGS water gage is in Tilton.

The Winnipesaukee River joins the Pemigewasset River just downstream from the center of Franklin, forming the Merrimack River.

== See also ==
- List of New Hampshire rivers
