= Jacob Noyes Block =

- U.S. National Register of Historic Places
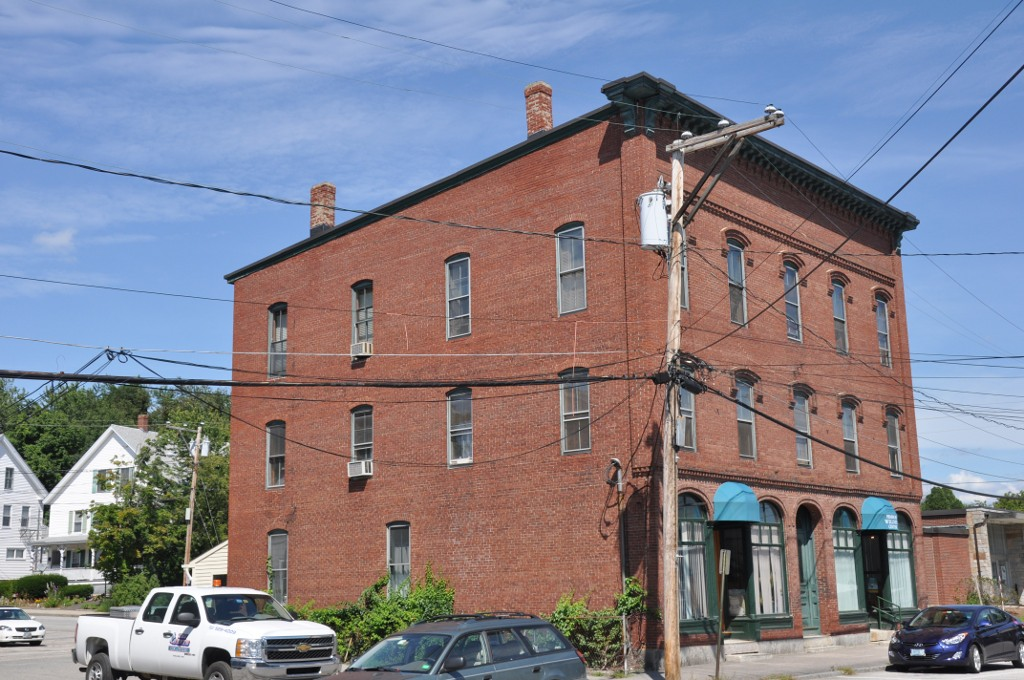

- Location within New Hampshire Location within the United States
- Location: 48 Glass St., Suncook, New Hampshire
- Coordinates: 43°7′50″N 71°27′6″W
- Area: less than one acre
- Built: 1865
- Architectural style: Italianate
- NRHP reference No.: 86000278
- Added to NRHP: February 27, 1986

The Jacob Noyes Block is a historic commercial building at 48 Glass Street in the Pembroke side of Suncook, New Hampshire. Built about 1865, it is a distinctive local example of Italianate commercial architecture, and is the largest 19th-century commercial building in the village. It was listed on the National Register of Historic Places in 1986.

== Description and history ==
The Jacob Noyes Block is located about one block east of the modest 19th-century commercial heart of Suncook, on the north side of Glass Street at its junction with Church Street. It is a handsome vernacular brick building with Italianate styling, three stories in height, with a flat roof. The ground floor has two storefronts, each with a recessed entry flanked by display windows, each of these elements set in a round-arch opening. The storefronts flank the main building entrance, also recessed in a round-arch opening. Upper-story windows are set in segmented-arch openings, headed by corbelled brick hoods. The windows are set in what appears as a recessed panel, defined by corner pilasters and brick beltcourses above the first floor and below the roof eaves.

The block was built by Jacob Noyes, a trader, as a speculative venture, in c. 1865. Noyes apparently believed that commercial development would proceed from the main village center of Suncook up Glass Street, but it never did, and the building (then as now), stands isolated from other period commercial buildings. The meeting space on the building's upper floor is also notable as the site of meetings of the secret Société Sainte Jean Baptiste, a social and political organization of French-Canadians who had come in large numbers to work in the Suncook mills.

== See also ==
- National Register of Historic Places listings in Merrimack County, New Hampshire
