= Suncook =

The name Suncook may refer to a location in the United States:

- The Suncook River in New Hampshire
- The Suncook Lakes, at the head of the river
- Suncook, New Hampshire, a village on the Suncook River
- The USS Suncook (1865), a United States naval vessel
