= Pembroke Mill =

- U.S. National Register of Historic Places
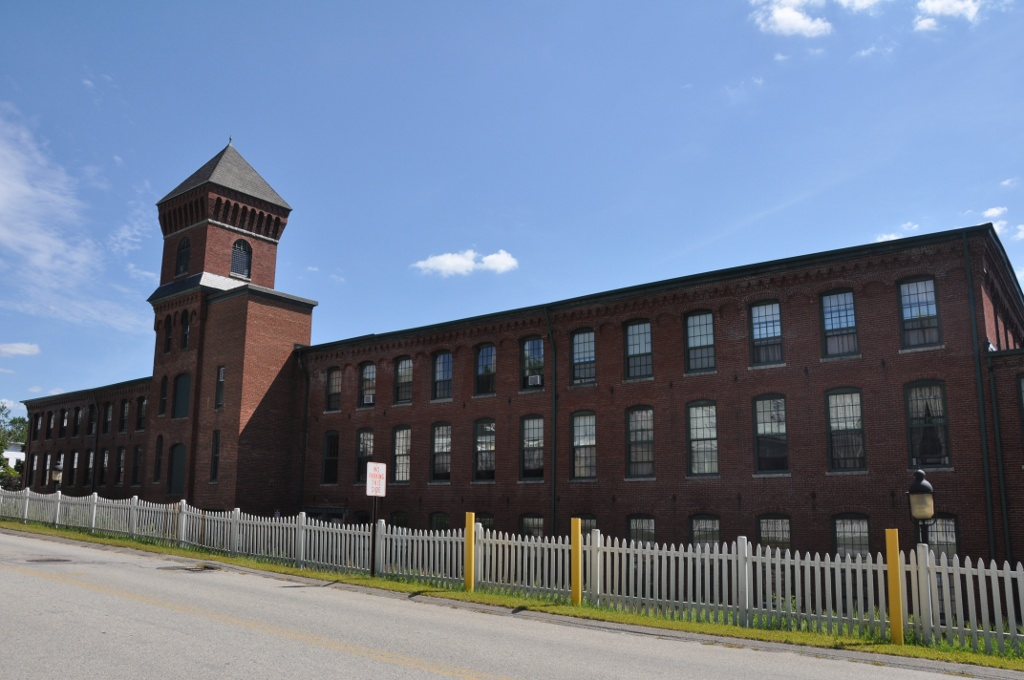

- Location within New Hampshire Location within the United States
- Location: 100 Main St., Pembroke, New Hampshire
- Coordinates: 43°7′49″N 71°27′18″W
- Area: 2.2 acres (0.89 ha)
- Built: 1860
- Architectural style: Renaissance Revival
- NRHP reference No.: 85002188
- Added to NRHP: September 12, 1985

The Pembroke Mill, now the Emerson Mills Condominiums, is a historic mill building at 100 Main Street in the village of Suncook in the town of Pembroke, New Hampshire, on the north bank of the Suncook River. Built in 1860, it is an early example of Renaissance Revival mill architecture, and was a major force in the growth of Suncook as an economic center. The mill building, now converted to residences, was listed on the National Register of Historic Places in 1985.

== Description and history ==
The Pembroke Mill is located near the center of the village of Suncook, on a parcel bounded by Main Street, Front Street, and the Suncook River. It is a large rectangular brick building, four stories in height. The most prominent feature of the building is its tower, a five-story campanile with narrow arched windows and wider arched doors on the lower levels, above which is an elaborate corbel table and a slate skirt. These are topped by the fifth level, which has single arched windows on each face, above which are a series of recessed arches in a flared corbelling that support the pyramidal slate roof. The building's many windows are set in segmented-arch openings with soldier brick headers.

The site where the mill was built has an industrial history beginning in the 18th century, when saw- and gristmills were established on the falls of the Suncook River. The Suncook Manufacturing Company was organized in 1860, buying up land and water rights on both sides of the river. The Pembroke Mill was its first building, completed the same year. The company also built mills upstream (the Webster Mill, since demolished), and downstream (the China Mill on the other side of the river, still standing). The population of Suncook tripled in the decade following construction of the mill, and the architecture of the village's downtown is reflective of the mill's.

== See also ==
- National Register of Historic Places listings in Merrimack County, New Hampshire
