= Suncook Village Commercial–Civic Historic District =

Historic district in New Hampshire, United States

- U.S. National Register of Historic Places
- U.S. Historic district
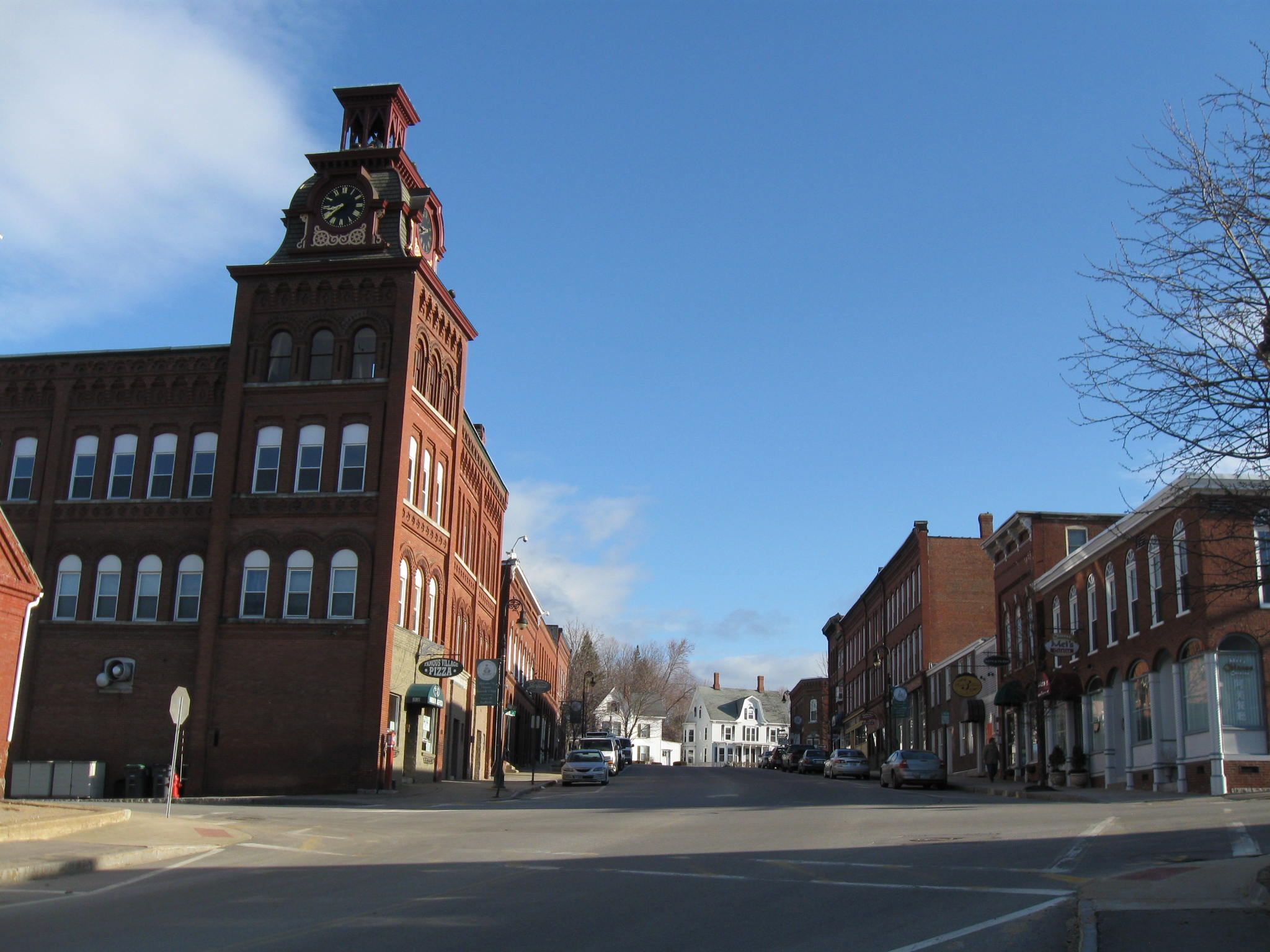
- Main Street, with Clock Tower on left

- Location within New Hampshire Location within the United States
- Location: 1,9-15 Glass St., 116-161 Main St., 19 Mill Falls, 4 Union St., Pembroke, New Hampshire
- Coordinates: 43°7′52″N 71°27′12″W
- Area: 3 acres (1.2 ha)
- Built: 1878
- Architects: Ordway, Samuel S.; Chapin, Edwin T., et al.
- Architectural style: Italianate, Renaissance, et al.
- NRHP reference No.: 05000174
- Added to NRHP: March 15, 2005

The Suncook Village Commercial–Civic Historic District encompasses the civic and commercial heart of Suncook, New Hampshire, a village on the Suncook River in Pembroke and Allenstown. The civic district is a 3-acre (1.2 ha) area on the Pembroke side of the river, adjacent to the Pembroke Mill, a site that had seen industrial use since the 18th century. The district includes 21 commercial buildings, 19 of which are historically significant. The district was listed on the National Register of Historic Places in 2005.

The Suncook area was settled in the late 1730s, and small-scale industrial works along the river were an early feature, with a sawmill and gristmill being followed by a fulling mill in the 1700s. The area did not begin to grow substantially until the 1830s, when the first textile mills began to be built there in 1814, although it did benefit from the presence first of ferry services and then bridges, placing the nascent village on major travel routes. Declining agricultural income and rising factory income led to the growth of the commercial center adjacent to the mill complexes that lined the river. In the 1850s the arrival of railroads spurred further growth. By the 1860s Main Street and Glass Street were lined with wood frame commercial buildings.

Fires in this area in the 1870s resulted in significant changes to the village. One fire in 1876 destroyed much of Main Street's west side, while a second destroyed much of the east side two years later. The town of Pembroke widened the street, and a significant number of brick buildings were built along Main Street. Many of the buildings in the district were built in the wake of these fires, and exhibit some Italian and Renaissance Revival styling that was popular at that time. The most architecturally interesting is the Clock Tower building at 116 Main Street, which occupies a prominent place overlooking the river, and whose four-story clock tower is the tallest structure in the village.

== See also ==
- National Register of Historic Places listings in Merrimack County, New Hampshire
