= Jonathan Pearson =

American author (1813–1887)

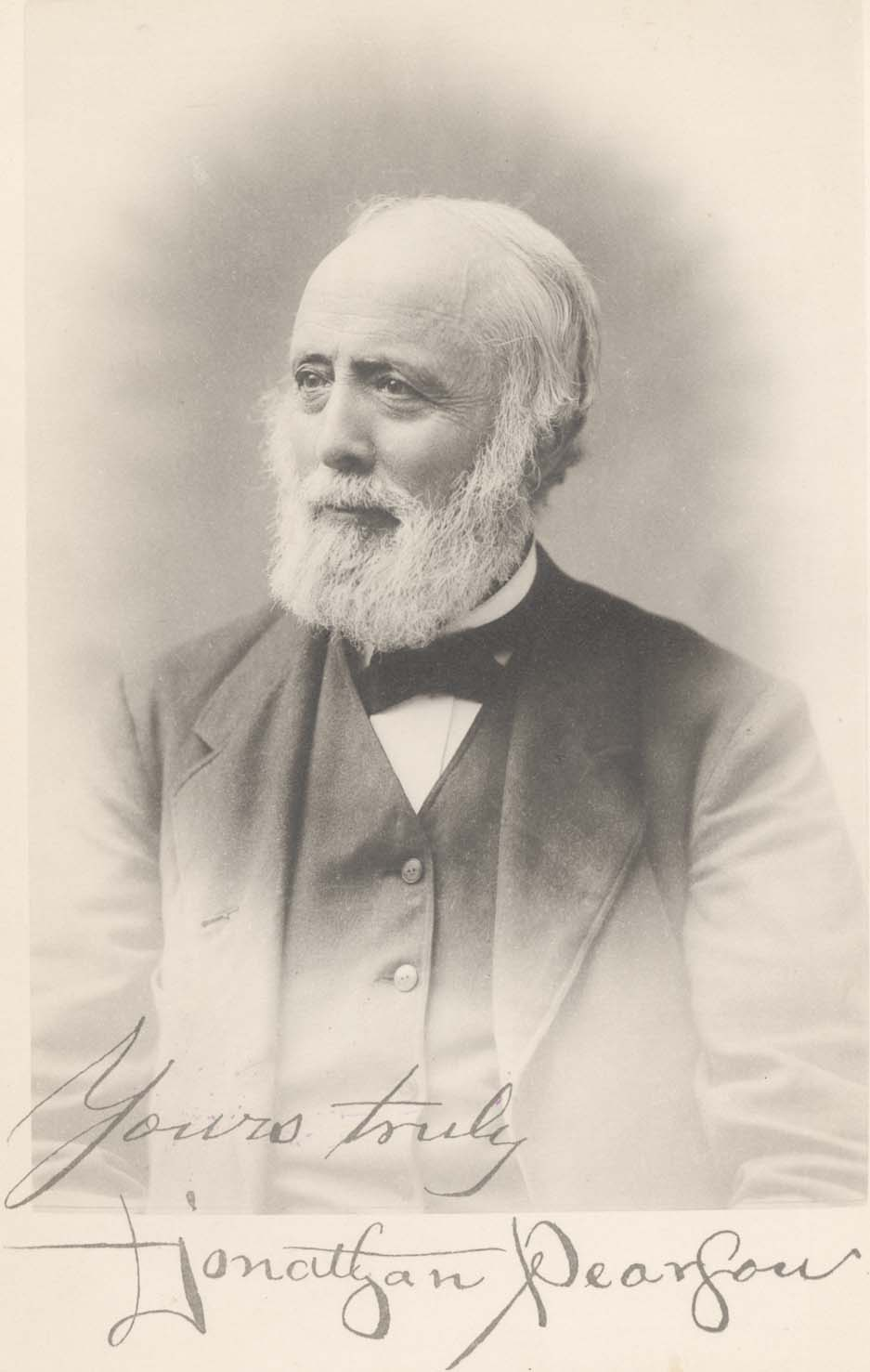
- Born: February 23, 1813; Chichester, New Hampshire, United States
- Died: June 20, 1887 (aged 74); Schenectady, New York, United States
- Scientific career
- Fields: Natural philosophy, chemistry, botany, agriculture, history.
- Workplaces: Union College

Jonathan Pearson (February 23, 1813 - June 20, 1887) was an American botanist and historian.

== Life ==
Pearson was born in Chichester, New Hampshire, where his father worked as a miller. From 1832 to 1835 he attended Union College in Schenectady, New York, as a student before taking a position as a tutor in 1836, eventually becoming a professor. Along with professorial positions, Pearson was the college's librarian from 1839 to 1886, and treasurer.

In April 1841 he married Mary Lord Hosford, and they had three children.

He died in Schenectady on June 20, 1887.

== Legacy ==
Pearson appears to be best known as a local historian who was particularly focused upon the history of Schenectady. He was also a plant collector and accomplished botanist, and was particularly interested in the local flora of his town.

== Botanical collections ==
A small number of specimens collected by Pearson are held by the National Herbarium of Victoria Royal Botanic Gardens Victoria, and the National Museum of Natural History, France. His collecting labels are identifiable through their Latinisation; Pearson is identified as Iona. Pearson and his collections are from Schenectadiae, Nov. Ebor.

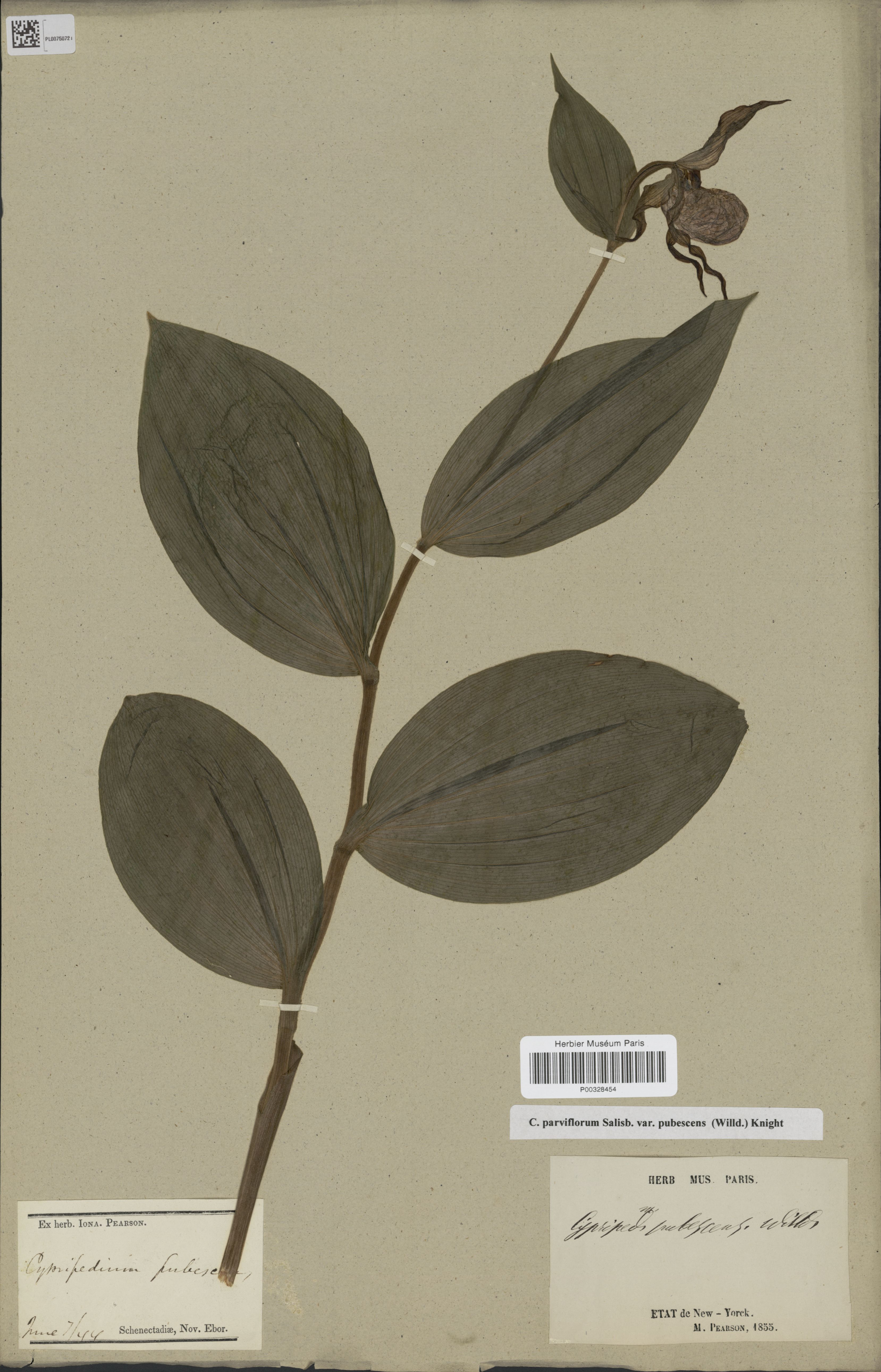
Example of a specimen collected by Pearson. Muséum national d’Histoire naturelle, Paris (France) Collection: Vascular plants (P) Specimen P00328454

== Published major works ==
- Pearson, Jonathan, A general catalogue of the officers, graduates and students of Union College from 1795 to 1854. (Schenectady : printed by S. S. Riggs, 1854)
- Pearson, Jonathan, Early records of the city and county of Albany, and colony of Rensselaerswyck (1656-1675) (Albany, N.Y. : J. Munsell, 1869) (Four volumes)
- Pearson, Jonathan, Contributions for the genealogies of the first settlers of the ancient county of Albany, from 1630 to 1800. (Albany, J. Munsell, 1872)
- Pearson, Jonathan, Two hundredth anniversary of the First Reformed Protestant Dutch church, of Schenectady, N. Y., June 20th and 21st ... 1880. (Schenectady : Daily and Weekly Union Steam Printing House, 1880)
- Jonathan Pearson, A. M. and others, edited by J. W. MacMurray. A History of the Schenectady Patent in the Dutch and English Times; being contributions toward a history of the lower Mohawk Valley (Albany, NY: J. Munsell's Sons, Printers, 1883)
- Jonathan Pearson, and Harold C. Martin (editor) The diary of Jonathan Pearson. (Schenectady: Union College Press, 2004)

== Unpublished sources ==
His diaries are held by the Union College library.
