= Graylag Nature Preserve =

Natural preserve in New Hampshire

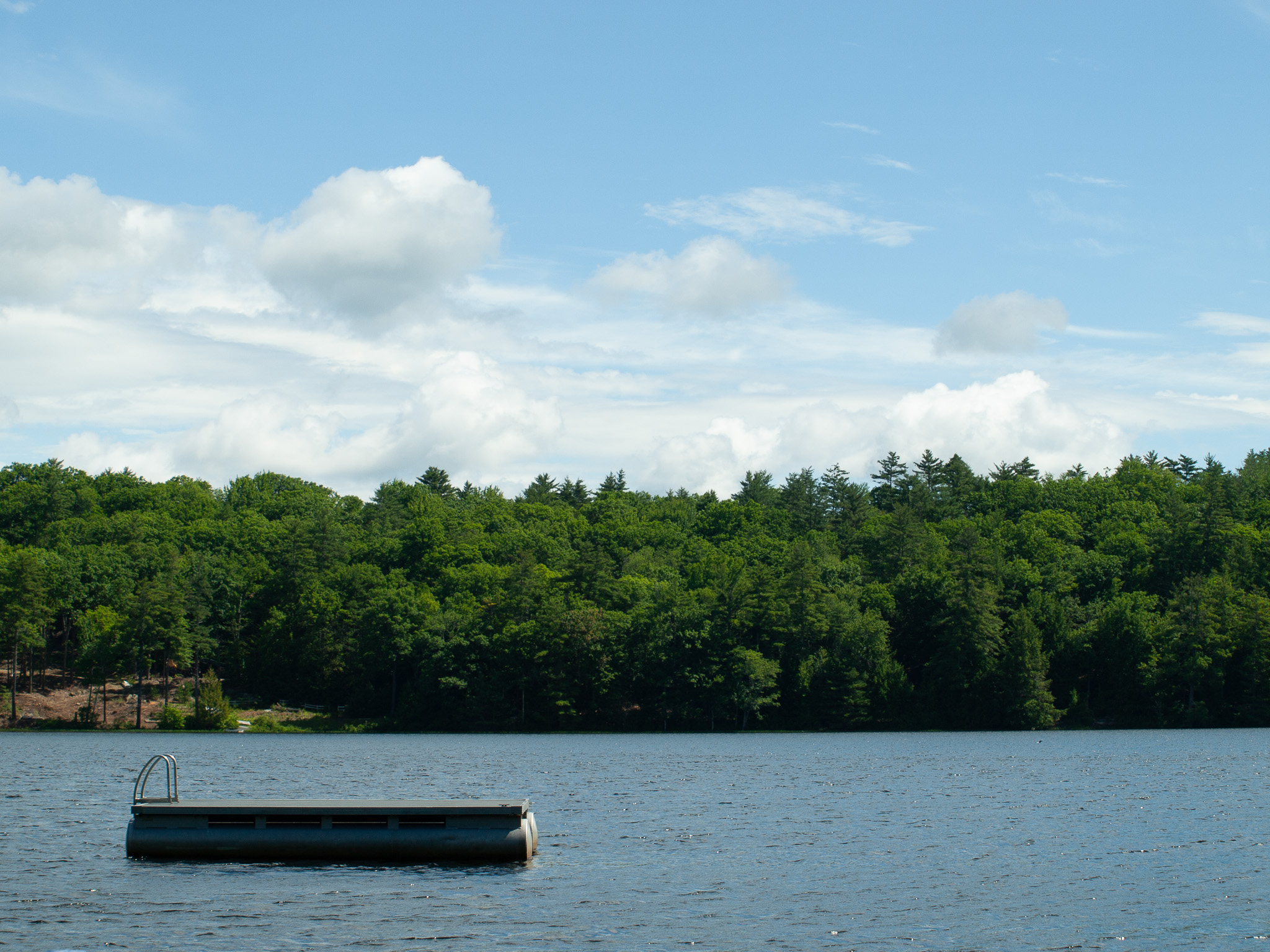
- Wild Goose Pond in June 2026

- Location within New Hampshire Graylag Nature Preserve (the United States)
- Established: 1946
- Location: 320 Clough Road, Pittsfield, New Hampshire
- Coordinates: 43°16′50″N 71°14′51″W
- Website: graylag.org

Graylag Nature Preserve is a 300-acre (120 ha) nonprofit nature preserve located in Pittsfield, New Hampshire, in the United States. It is listed on the New Hampshire State Register of Historic Places.

== History ==
Graylag was opened as a camp for boys in 1946 by the Geib family, and in 1952, basketball player Bob Cousy became a partner in what was then called Camp Graylag, and established its basketball program. Paved, collegiate regulation courts were built alongside the shores of the Wild Goose Pond. For more than 20 years, Cousy coached boys in summer.

Later, the property was purchased by environmentalist Carl Wallman who established Graylag as a 501(c)(3) nonprofit to preserve and protect the property.

== Land stewardship ==
Under Wallman, Graylag entered into a conservation easement with Bear Paw Regional Greenways in 2017 that protected 175.77 acres (71.13 ha) of land. The specific purposes of this conservation were to protect habitats, ecosystems, biodiversity, and watershed quality on the property while maintaining the scenery to be enjoyed by the public. The conservation easement also served to enlarge the protected area of thousands of acres of adjacent unfragmented lands.

== Programs ==
Graylag hosts artistic and scientific programs that focus on the local environment. Programs, led by specialists, include vernal pool ecology walks, loon educational programs, and woodland management workshops.

== Ecology ==
Graylag and the Wild Goose Pond watershed include ecological features such as vernal pools, headwater streams, scrub-shrub wetlands, wet meadows, and freshwater wetlands that rely on beaver dams. The property and surrounding watershed mostly consists of Appalachian hemlock–northern hardwood forest, a forest type commonly overlooked by conservation efforts. This forest type covers over 50% of New Hampshire, and hosts species such as the bald eagle, black bear, moose, beaver, and wood frog.
