= David L. Jewell House =

Historic house in Massachusetts, United States

- U.S. National Register of Historic Places
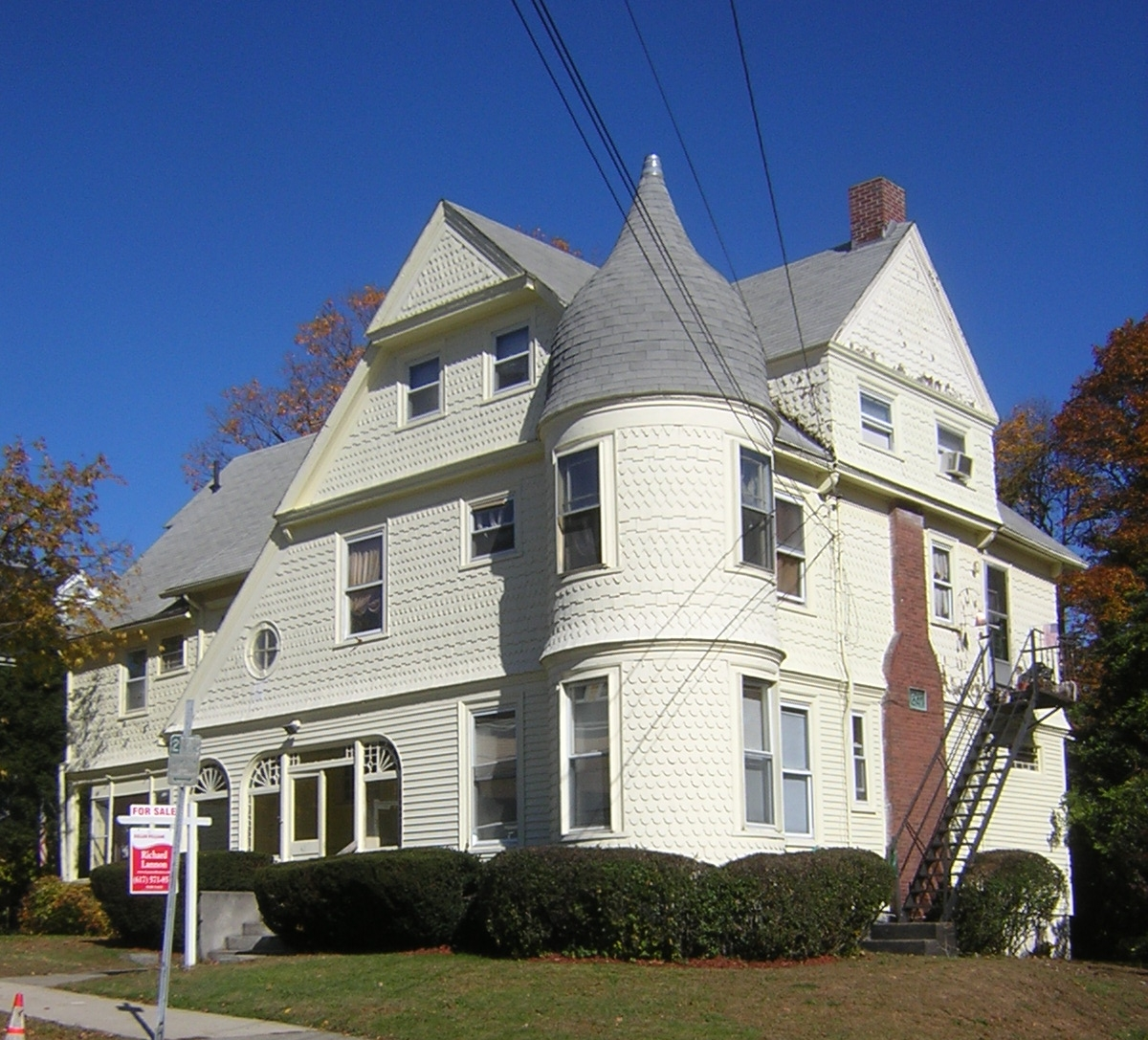

- Location within Massachusetts Location within the United States
- Location: 48 Grandview Ave., Quincy, Massachusetts
- Coordinates: 42°15′50″N 71°1′10″W
- Built: 1887
- Architectural style: Shingle Style
- MPS: Quincy MRA
- NRHP reference No.: 89001338
- Added to NRHP: September 20, 1989

The David L. Jewell House is a historic house at 48 Grandview Avenue in Quincy, Massachusetts.

== History ==
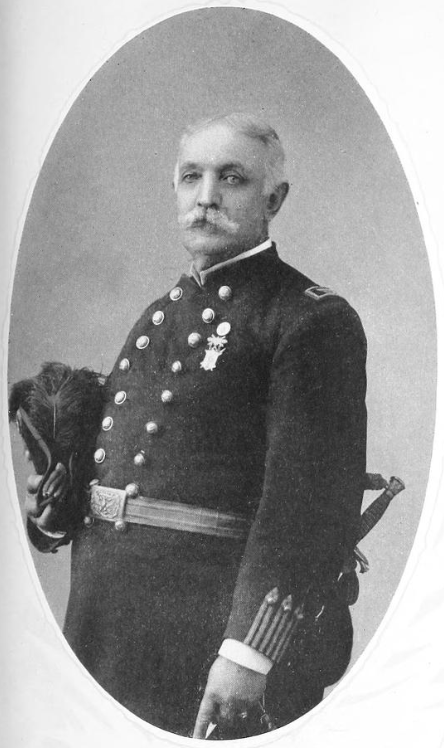
David L. Jewell

The 2 1/2-story wood-frame house was built in 1887 for David Lyman Jewell, a mill agent from Suncook, New Hampshire. The house is one of the most elaborate Queen Anne Victorians on Wollaston Hill, exhibiting a wide variety of decorative shingles, a domed tower, and varied roof and dormer gables. It has a large sloping front gable, which extends all the way down to the first floor, partially sheltering the elaborately decorated porch. Its carriage barn, now a garage, is one a small number of such surviving outbuildings in Quincy.

The house was listed on the National Register of Historic Places in 1989.

== See also ==
- National Register of Historic Places listings in Quincy, Massachusetts
