= Crystal Lake (Gilmanton, New Hampshire) =

Lake in Belknap County, New Hampshire

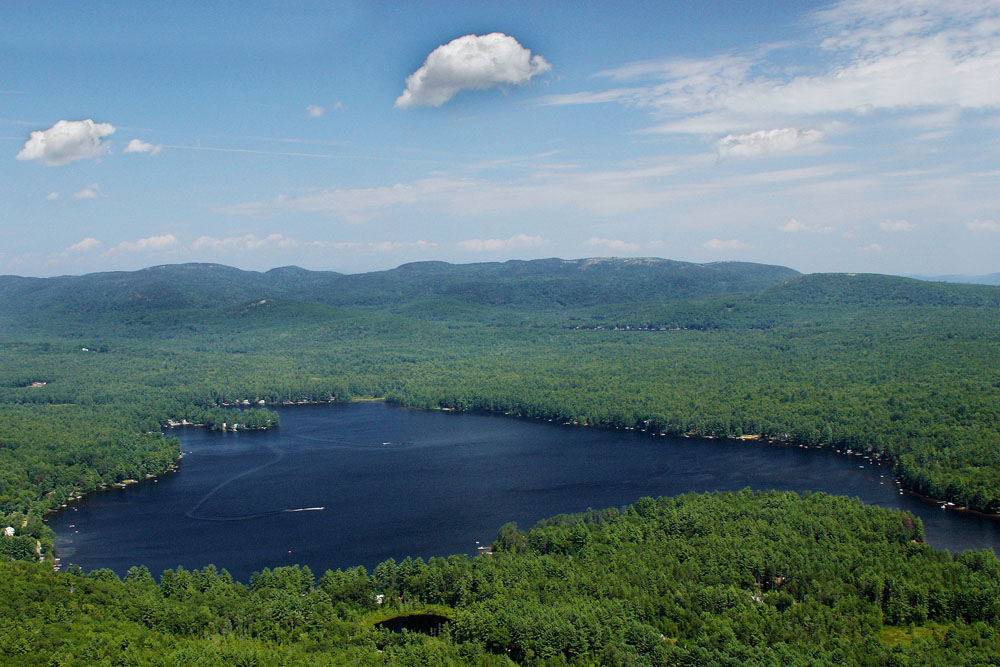

- Location within New Hampshire Location within the United States
- Location: Gilmanton, Belknap County, New Hampshire
- Coordinates: 43°26′36″N 71°18′41″W
- Primary inflows: Nelson Brook
- Primary outflows: Suncook River
- Basin countries: United States
- Max. length: 2.8 mi (4.5 km)
- Max. width: 0.8 mi (1.3 km)
- Surface area: 455 acres (1.8 km^{2})
- Average depth: 16 ft (4.9 m)
- Max. depth: 53 ft (16 m)
- Surface elevation: 623 ft (190 m)
- Settlements: Gilmanton Ironworks (town of Gilmanton)

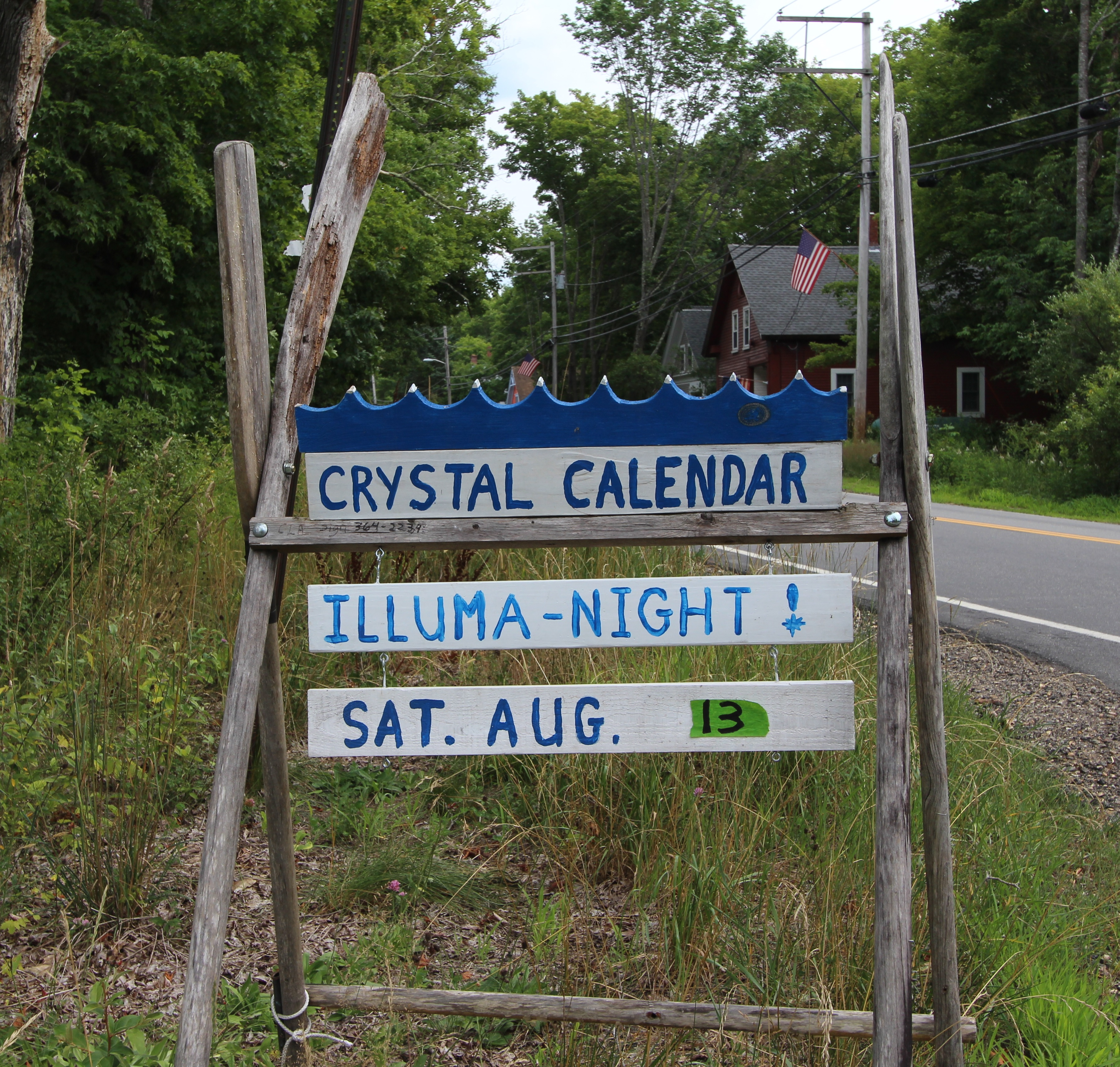
The Crystal Calendar lists public activities on the lake. It can be found at the intersection of Crystal Lake Road and Route 140.

Crystal Lake is a 455-acre (1.8 km^{2}) water body located in Belknap County in the Lakes Region of central New Hampshire, United States, in the town of Gilmanton. Crystal Lake is at the head of the Suncook River watershed. Water flows into Crystal Lake from the Belknap Range through Manning and Sunset lakes to the north. Water from Manning Lake enters Crystal Lake via Nelson Brook. Other waterways flowing into Crystal Lake include Wasson Brook and Mill Brook. Water flows out of a dam from the southern end of Crystal Lake via the Suncook Lakes and Suncook River to the Merrimack River. Shoreline development along Crystal Lake consists primarily of summer cottages, with a few year-round residents. Belknap Mountain and Mount Major can be seen from the shoreline.

== Weather and climate ==
Average summertime daytime high temperatures are approximately 80 °F (27 °C), with overnight lows around 65 °F (18 °C). A typical winter day brings a maximum of 28 °F (−2 °C), with overnight minimums around 15 °F (−9 °C). Typical wintertime extremes are 50 °F (10 °C) and −20 °F (−29 °C), but greater extremes have been recorded nearby. Surface water temperatures range from a high near 80 °F (27 °C) in late July and early August to a hard freeze by year end.

== Activities ==
There is a public boat launch, park and beach towards the southern end of the lake. Yearly festivals and fireworks occur during the Fourth of July and Labor Day holidays in the park on the lake. Other annual events include a boat parade, a sailboat race, and illuma-night. Motorized water vessels are permitted. Fishing is common year round. Water skiing, kayaking, sailing and Jet Skiing are common in the summer. Ice fishing is common during the winter.

The lake is classified as a warm- and coldwater fishery, with observed species including rainbow trout, rainbow smelt, smallmouth bass, largemouth bass, chain pickerel, brown bullhead, yellow perch, and sunfish.

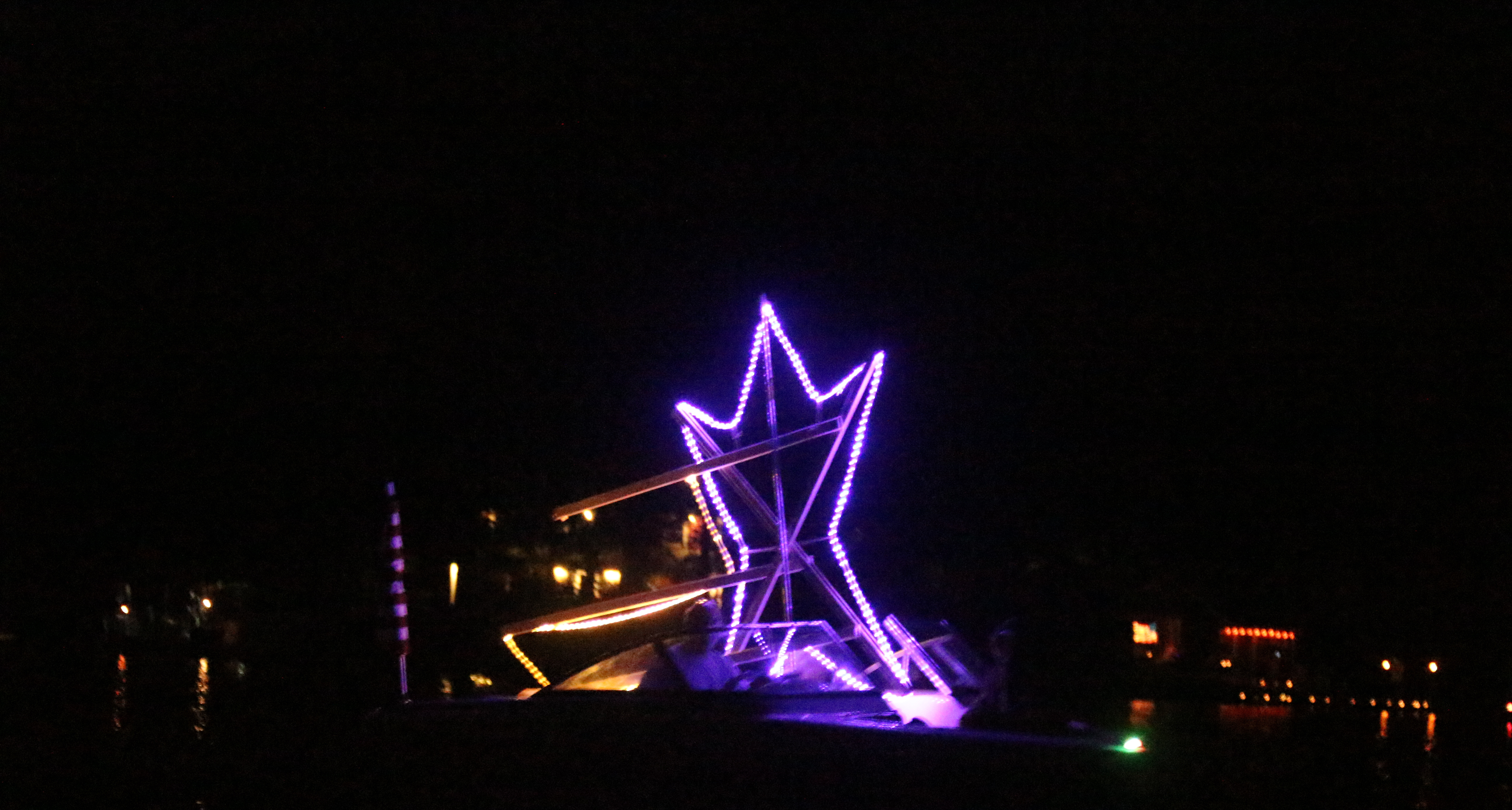
Boat participating in annual Illuma-Night festivities (mid-August)

== History ==
Native Indians referred to Crystal Lake as "Suncook" in reference not only to the lake, but also to the Suncook River that originates there. Early settlers referred to Crystal Lake as Lougee's Pond, in reference to the Lougee family that resided on the western side of the lake.

Iron content in and around Crystal Lake was enough to attract interest in iron mining; references to mining date back to 1778. The settlement that grew up at the outlet of Crystal Lake is accordingly called Gilmanton Ironworks.

In the early 1900s a resort known as "The Pines" was established on the southern peninsula of Crystal Lake. The resort subsequently burned down and was abandoned.

== Wildlife ==
Crystal Lake is a nesting site for common loons and is a good place to see them in breeding plumage during the summer months. Bald eagles and great blue herons are also known to visit the lake. Moose, black bear, otters, and beavers have been sighted near the shoreline.

== Photo gallery ==
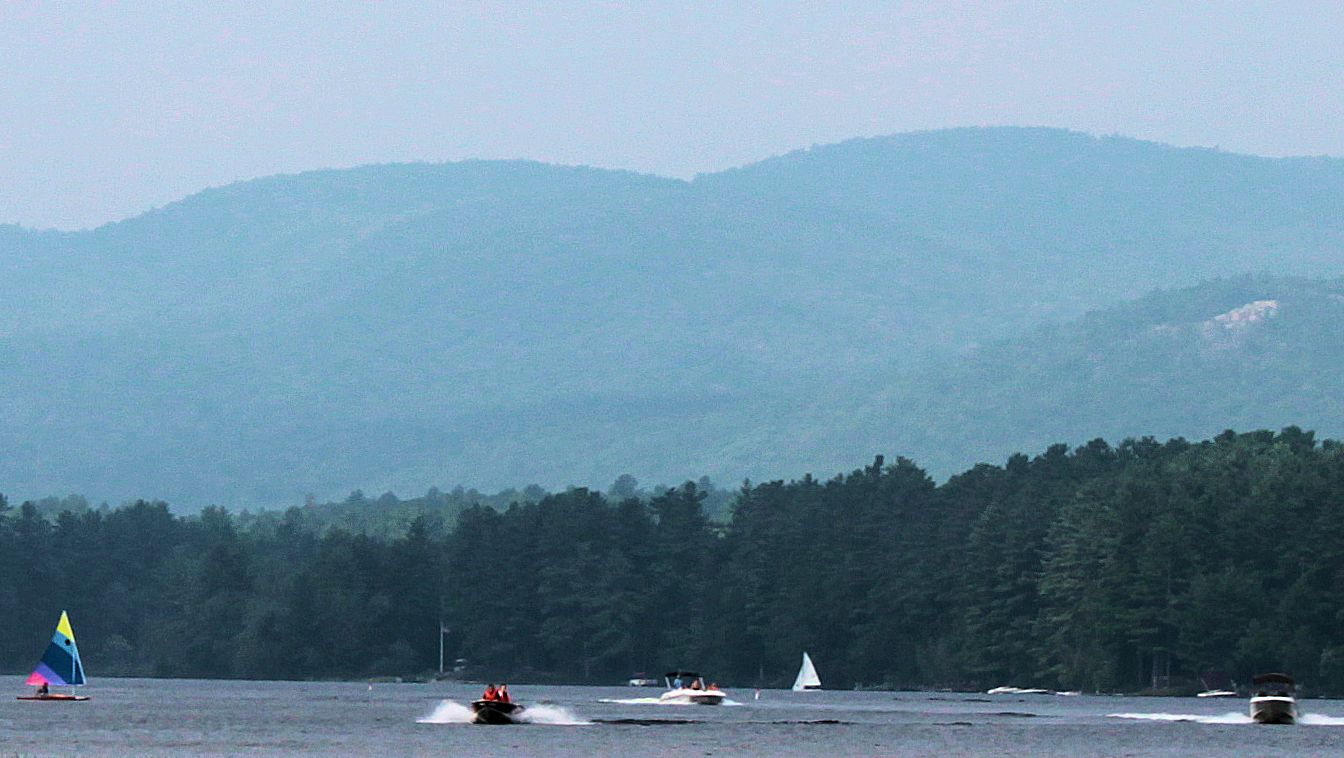
Crystal Lake in summer, with Belknap Mountain in distance

Crystal Lake as seen from summit of Mt. Mack in Winter 2013

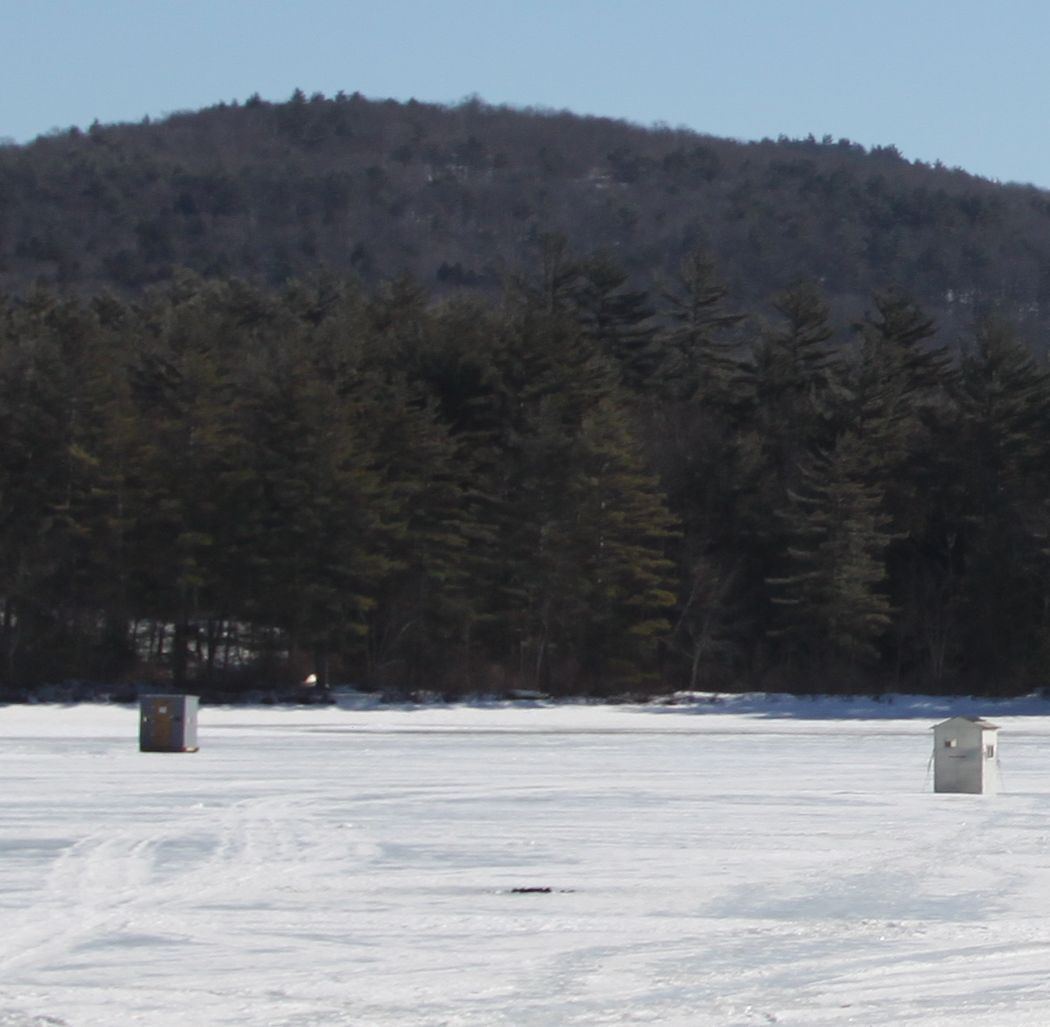
Winter

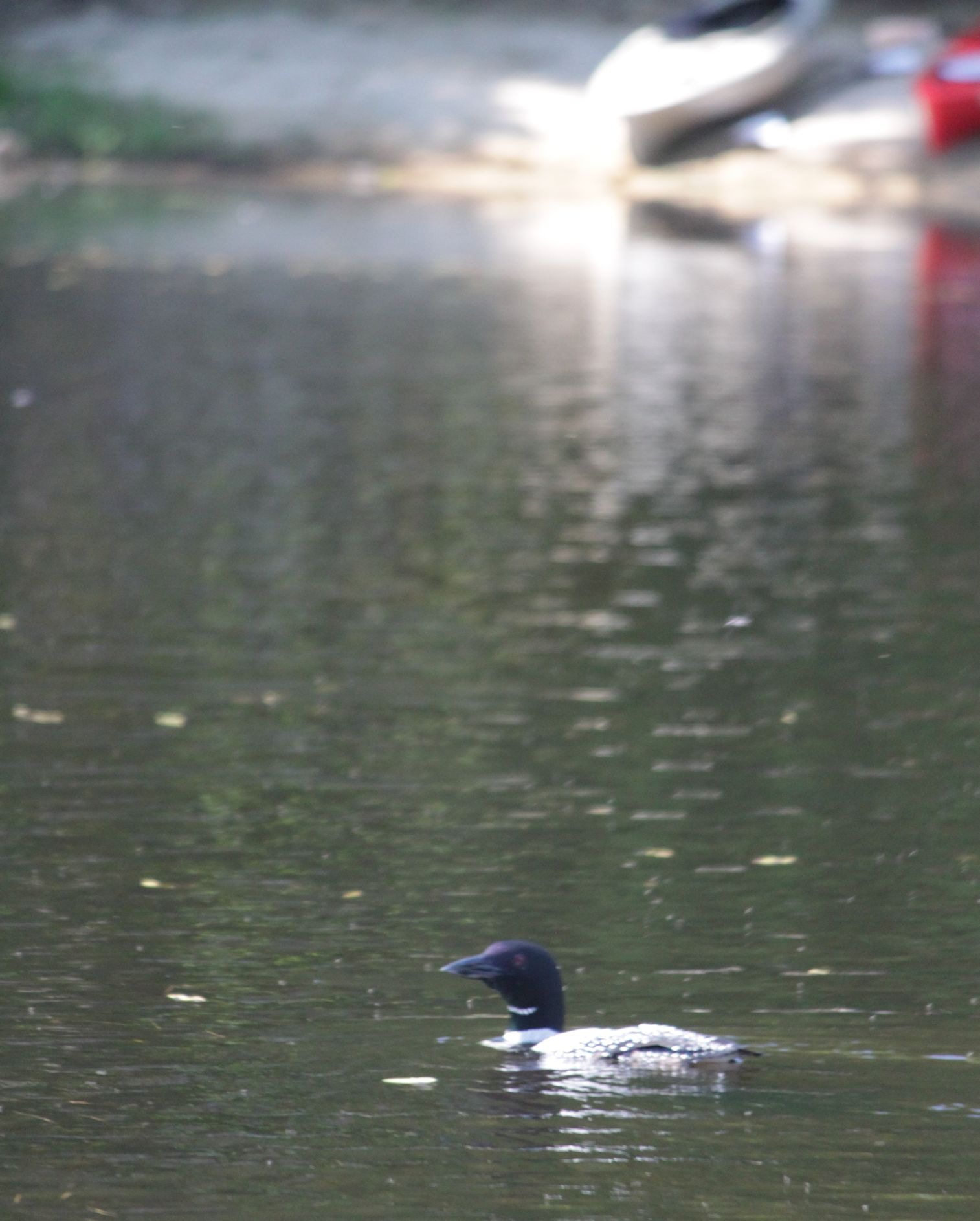
Loon near shoreline

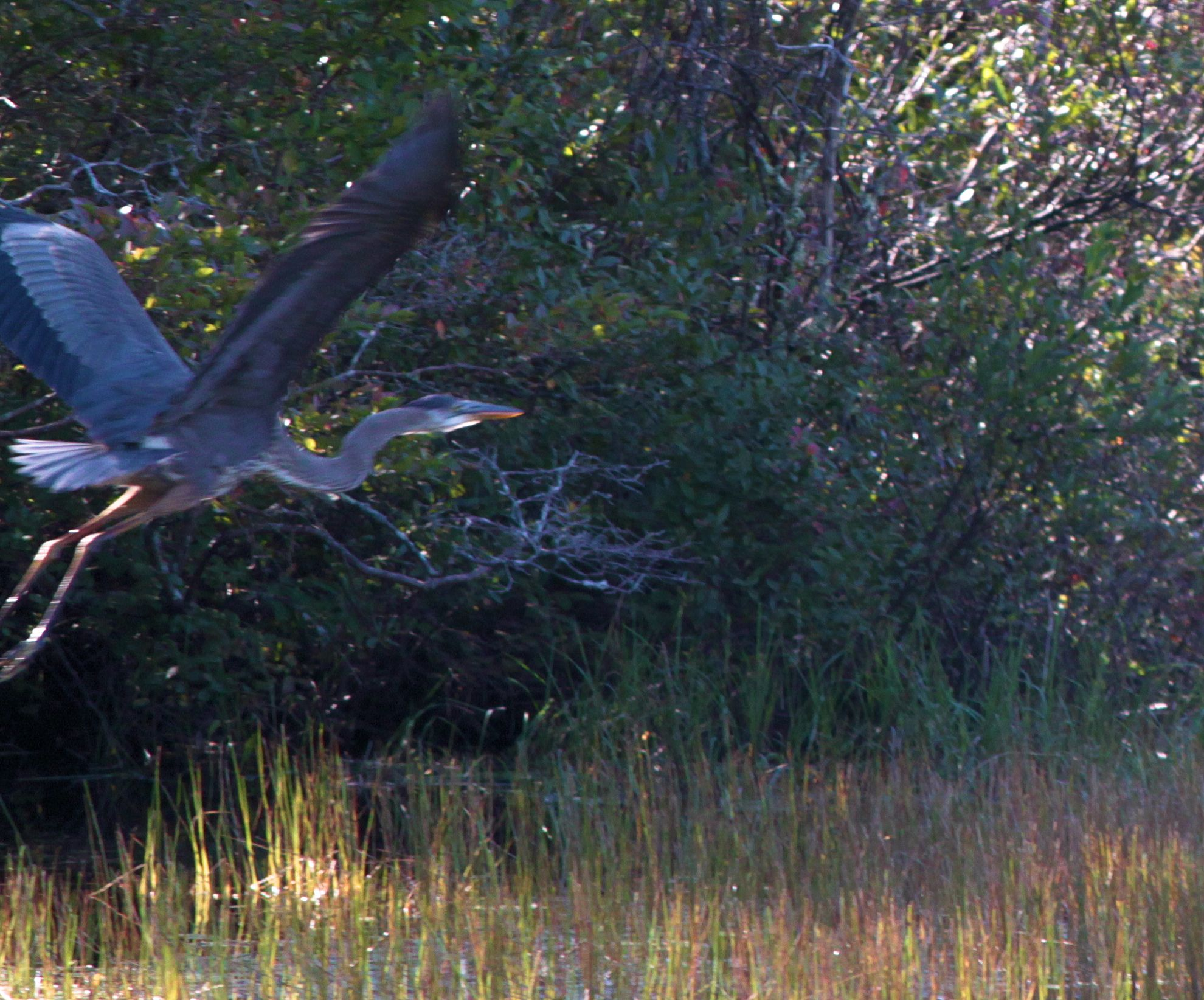
Blue heron on northeast shore

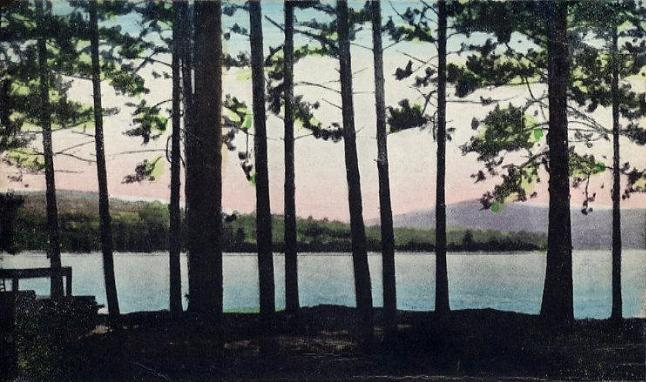
Crystal Lake in 1909

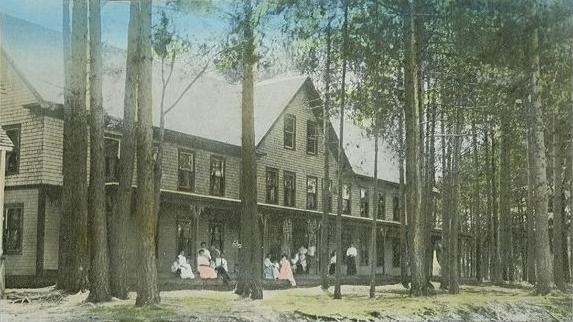
The Pines Resort 1910

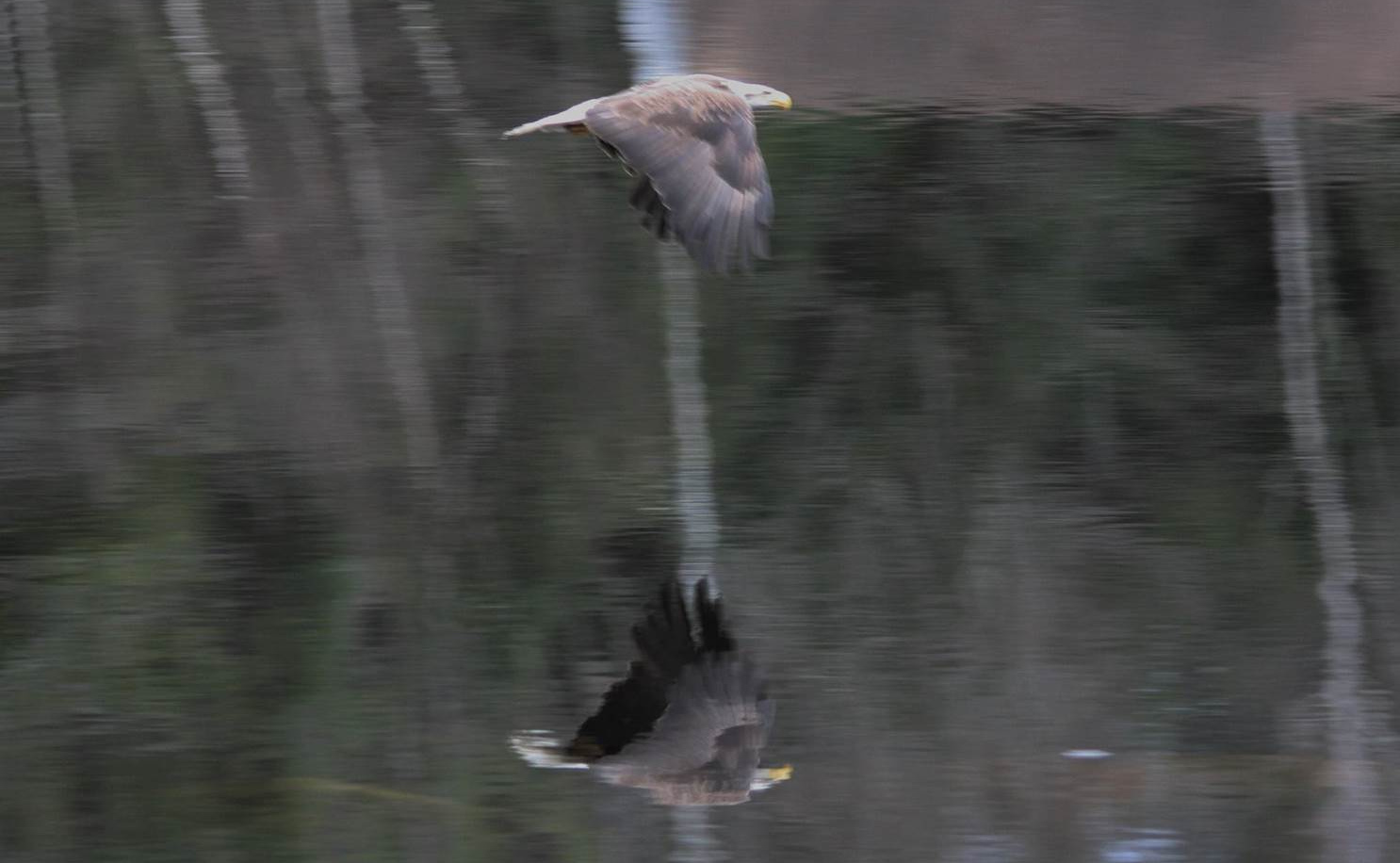
Eagle with reflection on Crystal Lake

== See also ==
- List of lakes in New Hampshire
