= Camp Fatima (New Hampshire) =

Summer camp with a waterfront

- Location within New Hampshire
- Coordinates: 43°23′51.9720″N 71°17′48.4080″W
- Campsites: Camp Fatima
- Facilities: Arts & Crafts Shed; Catholic Church; Horse Stable; Tennis Court; Riflery Range; Archery Range; Crossbow Range; Axe-Throwing Range; Boating Swimming Facilities; High and Low Ropes Courses; Tetherball Courts; Field House; Basketball Courts; Baseball Fields; BB Gun Range
- Fee: $1950 (Regular)
- Owner: Darren Van Dzura (Resident Director)
- Established: 1949
- Website: bfcamp.com

Camp Fatima is a Catholic overnight summer camp located in Gilmanton Iron Works, NH. The camp has a waterfront on the northern shore of Upper Suncook Lake.

== History ==
The camp was founded in 1949 by Richard O Boner, after the previous establishment, a Jewish camp named Camp Wingo, closed and relocated to Maine. The camp is named after Our Lady of Fátima, a Marian apparition observed in 1917 by three shepherd children at the Cova da Iria, in Fátima, Portugal.

New Hampshire Governor Chris Sununu attended Camp Fatima from 1984 to 1989.

== Program ==
Camp Fatima has four normal sessions during the summer. Each session is two weeks long. Along with the normal sessions, the camp also offers a special needs week. The camp programs are as follows:

- Juniors: Ages 6–10
- Intermediates: Ages 11–12
- Seniors: Ages 13–14
- Club 15: Age 15

For those who wish to attend the camp over the age of 15, they can apply for the CIT (Counselor in Training) program. For the campers, the camp has cabins, with each cabin having approximately eight bunk beds.

Fatima previously held "Exceptional Citizens Week" where people ages 9 and older with intellectual or physical challenges participate in a week of traditional camp activities such as horseback riding, swimming, boating, arts and crafts, and more at no cost to the camper. In 2024 Camp Fatima decided to cancel their "Exceptional Citizens Week" citing "catholic values" not being upheld in an October 19 email from Bishop Peter Libasci.

== Controversy ==
Multiple accusations of sexual abuse of minors have been levied on Camp Fatima's leaders.

"Dowd was the camp director until 1990. Dowd's notorious abuse wasn't known to the public until after he died in 2002 when several former campers came forward. But the victim alleges the diocese knew that Dowd sexually assaulted children.

Several former campers filed a class action lawsuit against the diocese in 2002, months after Dowd died while on vacation in Florida. That lawsuit was later settled out of court."

Some of these cases have gone as far as the New Hampshire supreme court.
