= Thomas W. Knox =

American writer and world traveler

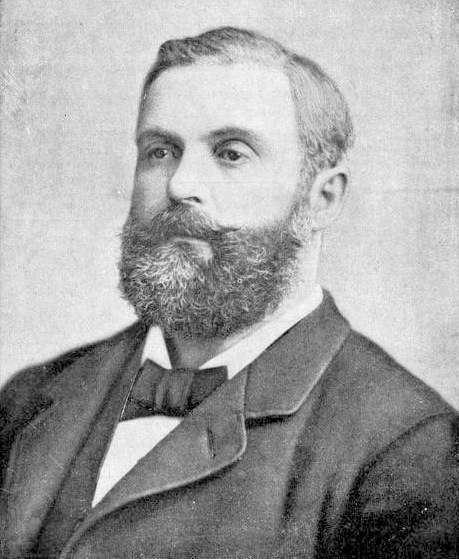
- Portrait of Knox, published in the New York Times on January 7, 1896, on his death
- Born: Thomas Wallace Knox; June 26, 1835; Pembroke, New Hampshire, U.S.
- Died: January 6, 1896 (aged 60); New York City, New York
- Occupations: Journalist, author
- Notable credit(s): New York Herald Civil War reporting The Boy Travelers series

Thomas Wallace Knox (June 26, 1835 – January 6, 1896) was an American journalist, author, and world traveler, known primarily for his work as a New York Herald correspondent during the American Civil War. As an author, Knox wrote over 45 books, including a popular series of travel adventure books for boys.

Knox was well known for his written attacks on William Tecumseh Sherman and his Union soldiers, which reintroduced into the public debate the issue of Sherman's sanity. His work was controversial as he published important information pertaining to the Vicksburg Campaign. Knox was acquitted on spy charges but found guilty of disobeying orders.

== Biography ==
Thomas Wallace Knox was born in Pembroke, New Hampshire, in 1835, where he attended local schools. He became a teacher, moving west into New York State and founding an academy in Kingston. In 1860, at the age of 25, Knox headed west to take part in the gold rush in Colorado. He soon started working for the Denver Daily News. In June 1860 he joined the staff of the Western Mountaineer as Military Editor, a role he continued through the close of the year.

Upon the outbreak of the Civil War, Knox enlisted in the California Volunteers, where he was commissioned as a lieutenant colonel. He was wounded in a Missouri skirmish, and subsequently discharged. At that point, Knox returned to journalism, as a correspondent for the New York Herald. He soon ran afoul of General Sherman.

After the war, Knox traveled the world widely, at first with the Russo-American Telegraph Company. He used these experiences as the basis for more travel, and wrote numerous books on foreign places for adults and children.

Knox never married. From the 1880s onward, when not traveling abroad, he lived at the Lotos Club in Manhattan. He spent his summers at the Olympic Club in Bay Shore, Long Island. Knox died at the Lotos Club in January 1896, shortly after returning from the Sahara.

== Memberships ==
- Lotos Club — Knox was Club secretary from 1880 to 1889
- Union League Club of New York
- Authors' Club
- Olympic Club

== Works ==
- Camp-Fire and Cotton-Field: Southern Adventure in Time of War (1865)
- Overland through Asia; Pictures of Siberian, Chinese, and Tartar Life (1871)
- The Boy Travellers in the Far East (1880)
- How to Travel (1881)
- The Story Teller of the Desert—"Backsheesh!" (1885)
- Horse Stories, and Stories of Other Animals (1890)
- The Land of the Kangaroo (1896)
- The Lost Army (1899)
- The Life of Robert Fulton and a History of Steam Navigation (1900)

== Selected bibliography ==
- Camp-Fire and Cotton-Field: Southern Adventure in Time of War, Life with the Union Armies, and Residence on a Louisiana Plantation (1865)
- Overland Through Asia: Pictures of Siberian, Chinese, and Tatar Life (1870)
- Backsheesh! or Life and Adventures in the Orient (1875)
- Decisive Battles Since Waterloo. The Most Important Military Events from 1815 to 1887 (1887)
- The Boy Travelers series (20 books)
  - The Boy Travelers in the Far East, Part First: Adventures of Two Youths in a Journey to Japan & China (New York: Harper, 1879)
  - The Boy Travelers in the Far East, Part Fourth: Adventures of Two Youths in a Journey to Egypt and the Holy Land (Harper & Bros., 1882)
  - The Boy Travelers in the Congo: Adventures of Two Youths in a Journey with Henry M. Stanley "Through the Dark Continent" (1887)
