= Pittsfield (CDP), New Hampshire =

Census-designated place in New Hampshire, United States

Pittsfield, New Hampshire
- Census-designated place
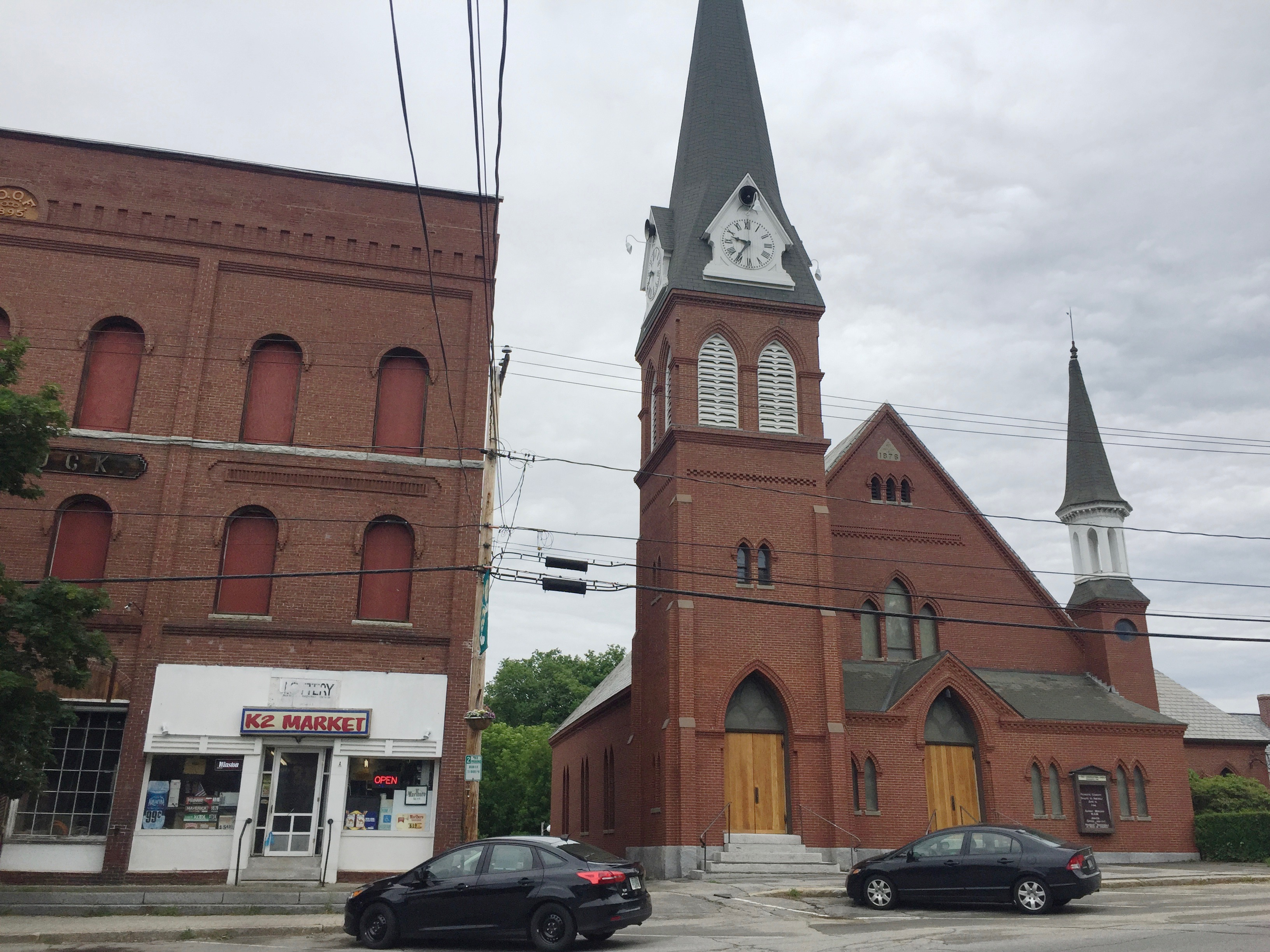
- Union Block and First Congregational Church, Bridge Street

- Location within New Hampshire Location within the United States
- Coordinates: 43°18′21″N 71°19′27″W
- Country: United States
- State: New Hampshire
- County: Merrimack
- Town: Pittsfield

Area
  - Total: 1.68 sq mi (4.36 km^{2})
  - Land: 1.68 sq mi (4.36 km^{2})
  - Water: 0 sq mi (0.00 km^{2})
- Elevation: 561 ft (171 m)

Population (2020)
  - Total: 1,570
  - Density: 933.5/sq mi (360.42/km^{2})
- Time zone: UTC-5 (Eastern (EST))
  - Summer (DST): UTC-4 (EDT)
- ZIP code: 03263
- Area code: 603
- FIPS code: 33-61860
- GNIS feature ID: 2378088

Pittsfield is a census-designated place (CDP) and the main village in the town of Pittsfield, New Hampshire, United States. The population of the CDP was 1,570 at the 2020 census, out of 4,075 in the entire town.

== Geography ==
The CDP occupies the central-western part of the town of Pittsfield, on both sides of the Suncook River. It is bordered to the southwest by the town of Chichester; to the northwest by New Hampshire Route 28; to the northeast by River Road, the Suncook River, and part of Bow Street; and to the southeast by Winant Road, the outlet of Whites Pond, and the Suncook River.

Route 28 bypasses the center of the village to its northwest, leading southwest 6 miles (10 km) to the Epsom traffic circle and northeast 13 miles (21 km) to Alton. New Hampshire Route 107 passes through the center of Pittsfield as Catamount Road and Carroll Street, leading southeast 8 miles (13 km) to Northwood Narrows and northwest 11 miles (18 km) to Gilmanton.

According to the U.S. Census Bureau, the Pittsfield CDP has a total area of 1.7 square miles (4.4 km^{2}), all of it recorded as land. The Suncook River, which flows through the center of the community, is part of the Merrimack River watershed.

== Demographics ==
Historical population
Census	Pop.	Note	%±
1950	1,342		—
1960	1,407		4.8%
1970	1,662		18.1%
1980	1,584		−4.7%
1990	1,717		8.4%
2000	1,669		−2.8%
2010	1,576		−5.6%
2020	1,570		−0.4%
U.S. Decennial Census

As of the census of 2010, there were 1,576 people, 639 households, and 383 families residing in the CDP. There were 750 housing units, of which 111, or 14.8%, were vacant. The racial makeup of the CDP was 96.6% white, 0.3% African American, 0.3% Native American, 0.6% Asian, 0.0% Pacific Islander, 0.1% some other race, and 2.2% from two or more races. 3.2% of the population were Hispanic or Latino of any race.

Of the 639 households in the CDP, 33.3% had children under the age of 18 living with them, 39.4% were headed by married couples living together, 15.0% had a female householder with no husband present, and 40.1% were non-families. 31.3% of all households were made up of individuals, and 9.4% were someone living alone who was 65 years of age or older. The average household size was 2.47, and the average family size was 3.07.

26.0% of residents in the CDP were under the age of 18, 9.9% were from age 18 to 24, 27.1% were from 25 to 44, 25.4% were from 45 to 64, and 11.6% were 65 years of age or older. The median age was 34.9 years. For every 100 females, there were 95.3 males. For every 100 females age 18 and over, there were 93.5 males.

For the period 2011–15, the estimated median annual income for a household was $27,798, and the median income for a family was $29,063. The per capita income for the CDP was $18,094. 23.1% of the population and 25.0% of families were below the poverty line, along with 22.7% of people under the age of 18 and 6.3% of people 65 or older.
