= Gilmanton Ironworks, New Hampshire =

Unincorporated community in New Hampshire, United States

- Unincorporated community
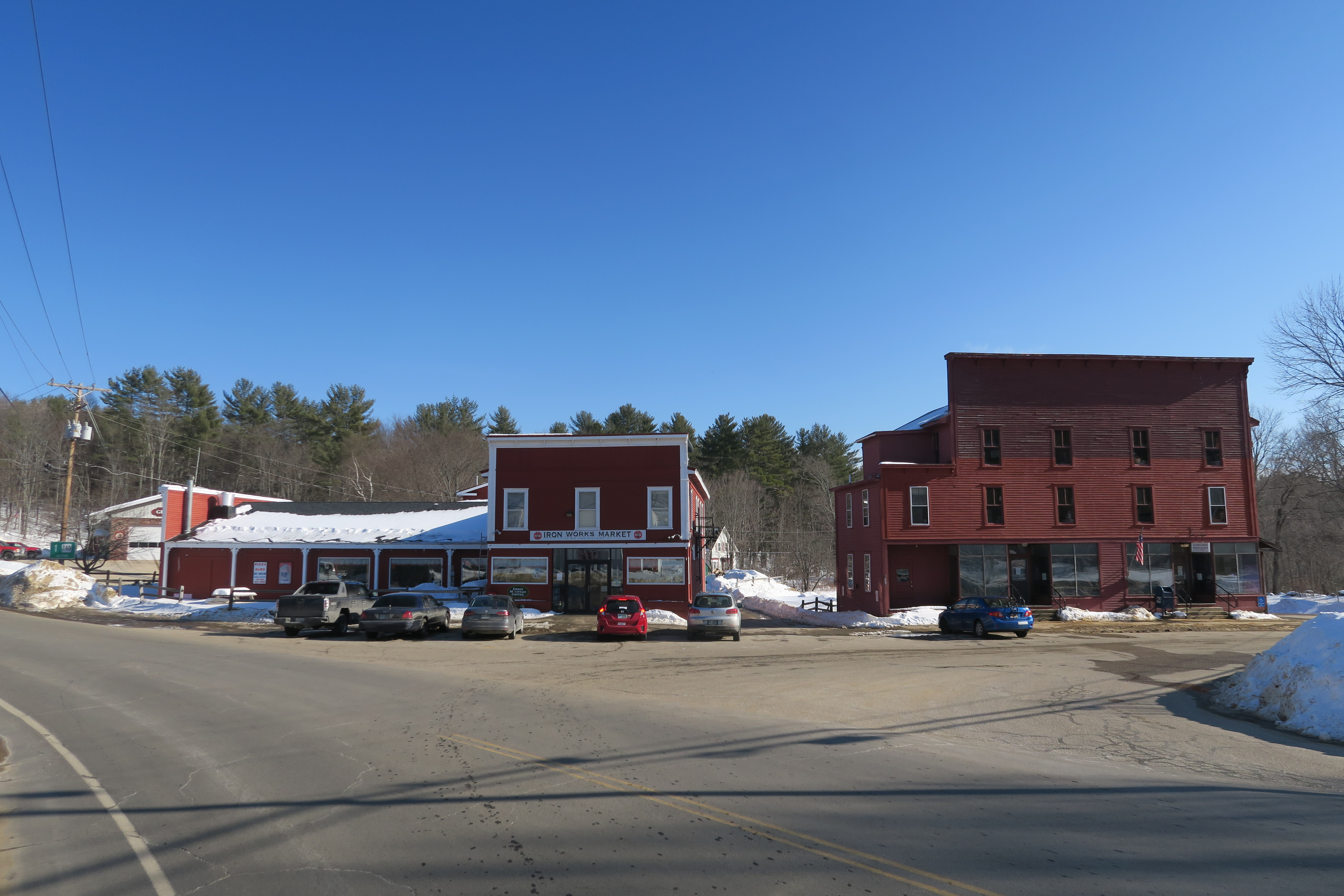
- Iron Works Market

- Location within New Hampshire Location within the United States
- Coordinates: 43°25′04″N 71°17′45″W
- Country: United States
- State: New Hampshire
- County: Belknap
- Town: Gilmanton
- Elevation: 614 ft (187 m)
- Time zone: UTC-5 (Eastern (EST))
  - Summer (DST): UTC-4 (EDT)
- ZIP code: 03837
- Area code: 603
- GNIS feature ID: 867073

Gilmanton Ironworks (alternately Gilmanton Iron Works) is an unincorporated community in the town of Gilmanton in Belknap County, New Hampshire, United States. It is located near the eastern boundary of the town, along a stretch of the Suncook River south of the outlet of Crystal Lake. New Hampshire Route 140 runs through the village, leading east to Alton and west to the center of Gilmanton and then Belmont.

The Gilmanton Ironworks ZIP code (03837) serves the eastern portion of the town of Gilmanton.

== Sites of interest ==
- Crystal Lake
- Camp Bell
- Camp Fatima
