= Pittsfield, New Hampshire =

- Town
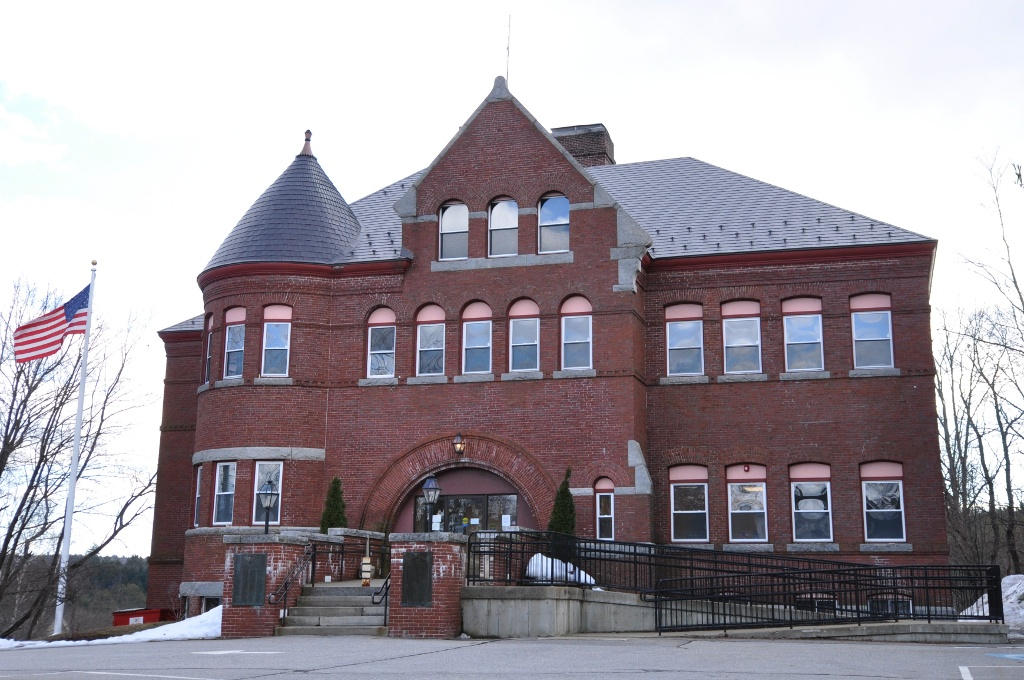
- Town hall

- Seal
- Motto: "The Gem of the Suncook Valley"
- Location in Merrimack County and the state of New Hampshire
- Coordinates: 43°18′17″N 71°19′42″W
- Country: United States
- State: New Hampshire
- County: Merrimack
- Incorporated: 1782

Area
  - Total: 24.31 sq mi (62.97 km^{2})
  - Land: 24.02 sq mi (62.22 km^{2})
  - Water: 0.29 sq mi (0.75 km^{2}) 1.19%
- Elevation: 525 ft (160 m)

Population (2020)
  - Total: 4,075
  - Density: 170/sq mi (65.5/km^{2})
- Time zone: UTC-5 (Eastern)
  - Summer (DST): UTC-4 (Eastern)
- ZIP code: 03263
- Area code: 603
- FIPS code: 33-61940
- GNIS feature ID: 873699
- Website: www.pittsfieldnh.gov

Pittsfield is a town in Merrimack County, New Hampshire, United States. The population was 4,075 at the 2020 census.

The main village in town, where 1,570 people resided at the 2020 census, is defined as the Pittsfield census-designated place (CDP), and is located on the Suncook River in the west-central portion of town. It consists of the built-up village centered on the intersections of Barnstead Road, Catamount Road, Carroll Street, and Depot Street. Since 1981, Pittsfield has hosted the annual Suncook Valley Rotary Hot Air Balloon Rally, the "Balloon Rally," in the first weekend of August.

== History ==
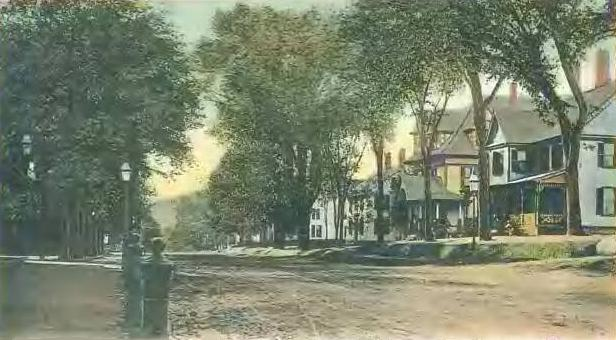
Main Street, looking east, in 1906

For many years prior to its 1782 incorporation, the area was an unnamed parish of Chichester. Like Pittsburg in the north, Pittsfield was named for William Pitt, Prime Minister of the United Kingdom, and a great friend of the colonies prior to the American Revolution. The town was settled in 1768 by several families originally from Hampton, New Hampshire. Founder John Cram built grist and sawmills here in the late 18th century. Since 1901, Globe Manufacturing has made protective clothing for firefighters here.

The town claimed the Guinness World Record in July 2001 as the place where the most people wore Groucho Marx glasses at the same time (522). Before Pittsfield's attempt, no other town had tried to set the record.

== Geography ==
According to the United States Census Bureau, the town has a total area of 24.3 square miles (63.0 km^{2}), of which 24.0 square miles (62.2 km^{2}) are land and 0.3 square miles (0.7 km^{2}) are water, comprising 1.19% of the town. Pittsfield is drained by the Suncook River, part of the Merrimack River watershed. The highest point in town is the summit of Catamount Mountain, at 1,331 feet (406 m) above sea level, southeast of the town center.

=== Adjacent municipalities ===
- Barnstead (north)
- Strafford (east)
- Northwood (southeast)
- Epsom (south)
- Chichester (southwest)
- Loudon (west)

== Demographics ==
Historical population
| Census | Pop. | Note | %± |
|---|---|---|---|
| 1790 | 888 | | — |
| 1800 | 987 | | 11.1% |
| 1810 | 1,050 | | 6.4% |
| 1820 | 1,178 | | 12.2% |
| 1830 | 1,271 | | 7.9% |
| 1840 | 1,719 | | 35.2% |
| 1850 | 1,828 | | 6.3% |
| 1860 | 1,838 | | 0.5% |
| 1870 | 1,600 | | −12.9% |
| 1880 | 1,974 | | 23.4% |
| 1890 | 2,605 | | 32.0% |
| 1900 | 2,129 | | −18.3% |
| 1910 | 2,222 | | 4.4% |
| 1920 | 1,914 | | −13.9% |
| 1930 | 2,018 | | 5.4% |
| 1940 | 2,183 | | 8.2% |
| 1950 | 2,321 | | 6.3% |
| 1960 | 2,419 | | 4.2% |
| 1970 | 2,517 | | 4.1% |
| 1980 | 2,889 | | 14.8% |
| 1990 | 3,701 | | 28.1% |
| 2000 | 3,931 | | 6.2% |
| 2010 | 4,106 | | 4.5% |
| 2020 | 4,075 | | −0.8% |
U.S. Decennial Census

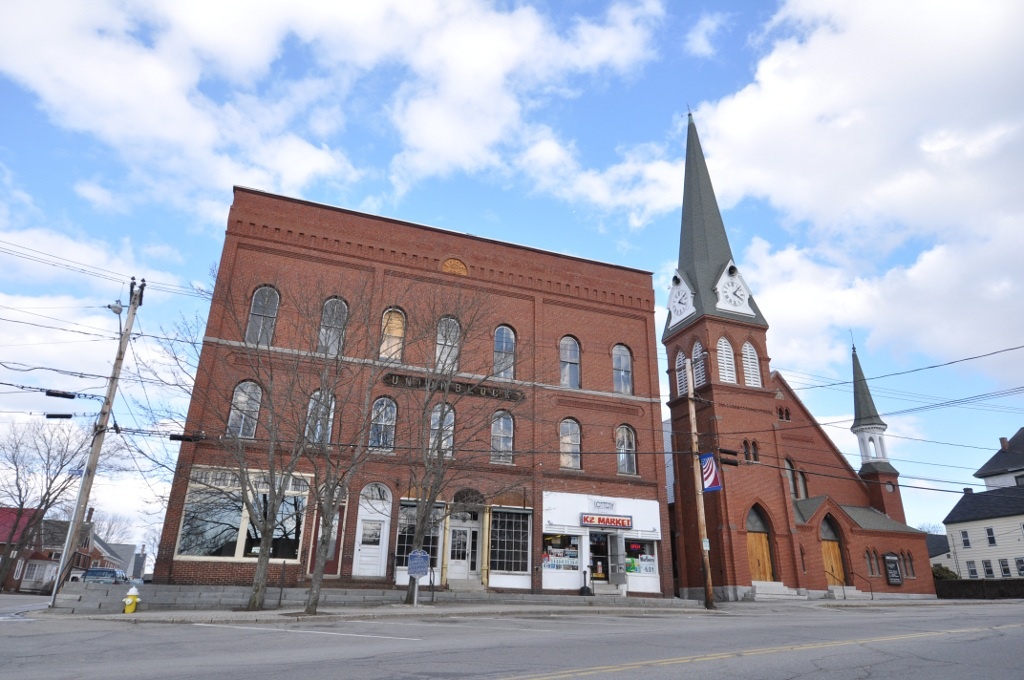
Union Block and Congregational church

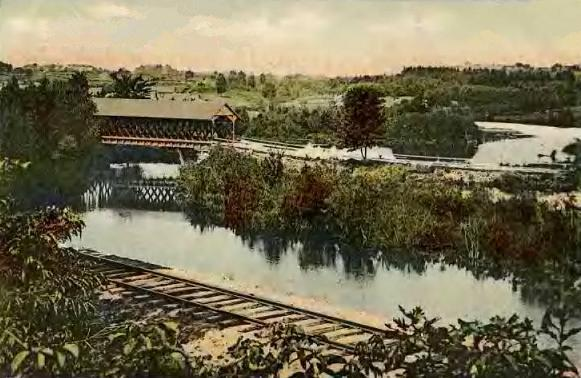
Suncook River in 1908

As of the census of 2010, there were 4,106 people, 1,579 households, and 1,076 families residing in the town. There were 1,769 housing units, of which 190, or 10.7%, were vacant. The racial makeup of the town was 96.9% white, 0.6% African American, 0.3% Native American, 0.6% Asian, 0.0% Native Hawaiian or Pacific Islander, 0.2% some other race, and 1.4% from two or more races. 1.9% of the population were Hispanic or Latino of any race.

Of the 1,579 households, 32.8% had children under the age of 18 living with them, 50.9% were headed by married couples living together, 12.1% had a female householder with no husband present, and 31.9% were non-families. 23.4% of all households were made up of individuals, and 7.0% were someone living alone who was 65 years of age or older. The average household size was 2.57, and the average family size was 3.00.

In the town, 23.1% of the population was under the age of 18, 8.7% were from 18 to 24, 27.1% from 25 to 44, 29.6% from 45 to 64, and 11.5% were 65 years of age or older. The median age was 39.4 years. For every 100 females, there were 98.6 males. For every 100 females age 18 and over, there were 95.1 males.

For the period 2011–2015, the estimated median annual income for a household was $47,959, and the median income for a family was $63,631. The per capita income for the town was $23,910. 16.3% of the population and 14.8% of families were below the poverty line. 17.2% of the population under the age of 18 and 5.4% of those 65 or older were living in poverty. Pittsfield ranks 212 of New Hampshire's 235 communities in household income.

== Artistic tributes ==
In 1934, the American composer Alan Hovhaness (1911–2000), who spent time with his maternal family members (specifically the family of the Reverend Walter Scott, his grandfather) in Pittsfield during his youth, wrote a fantasy for cello and piano entitled Legend of the Sunkook [sic] Valley (Op. 1, no. 4).

== Education ==
There are two public schools in the town. Pittsfield Elementary School serves students in pre-school to 5th grade, and Pittsfield Middle High School serves grades 6–12.

As of the 2016-2017 school year, Pittsfield Middle High School had a four-year graduation rate of 71%, which is lower than the New Hampshire average of 89%.

Current members of the Pittsfield School Board, which governs the district, include Sandra Adams as Chairperson, Molly Goggin as Vice Chairperson, and Adam Gauthier, Timothy Robinson, and Eric Nillson as members.

== Notable people ==
- John M. Berry (1827–1887), Minnesota Supreme Court justice, legislator born in Pittsfield
- Frank Ellsworth Blaisdell (1862–1946), professor of surgery, noted entomologist
- Warren Chase (1813–1891), pioneer, reformer, politician; co-founder of Ripon College
- Ebenezer Knowlton (1815–1874), congressman from Maine
- Ed Siudut (c. 1947–2012), Holy Cross and professional basketball player
- John Swett (1830–1913), founder of the California public school system
- Harrison R. Thyng (1918–1983), US Air Force general, World War II flying ace

== See also ==
- New Hampshire Historical Marker No. 197: Jonathan "Jockey" Fogg, Patriot
