= Chichester, New Hampshire =

Town in New Hampshire, United States

- Town
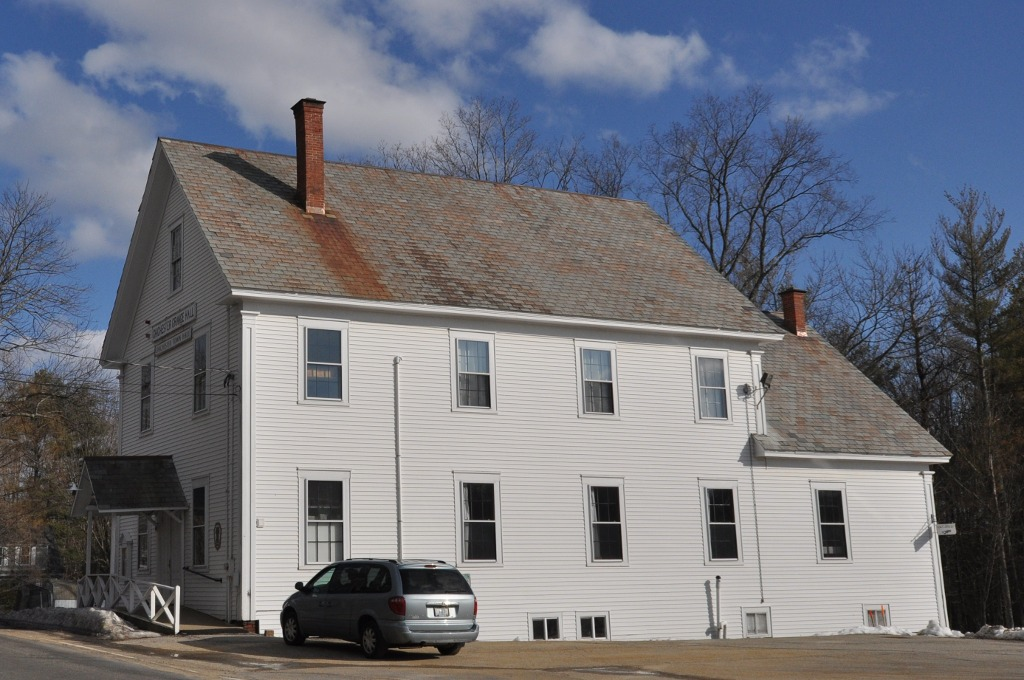
- Chichester Grange Hall, which houses town offices, is listed in the State Register of Historic Places

- Seal

- Location in Merrimack County and the state of New Hampshire
- Coordinates: 43°14′57″N 71°23′59″W
- Country: United States
- State: New Hampshire
- County: Merrimack
- Incorporated: 1727
- Villages: Chichester; North Chichester

Area
  - Total: 21.29 sq mi (55.15 km^{2})
  - Land: 21.19 sq mi (54.88 km^{2})
  - Water: 0.10 sq mi (0.27 km^{2}) 0.50%
- Elevation: 581 ft (177 m)

Population (2020)
  - Total: 2,665
  - Density: 126/sq mi (48.6/km^{2})
- Time zone: UTC-5 (Eastern)
  - Summer (DST): UTC-4 (Eastern)
- ZIP code: 03258
- Area code: 603
- FIPS code: 33-12420
- GNIS feature ID: 873566
- Website: www.chichesternh.org

Chichester is a town in Merrimack County, New Hampshire, United States. The population was 2,665 at the 2020 census.

== History ==
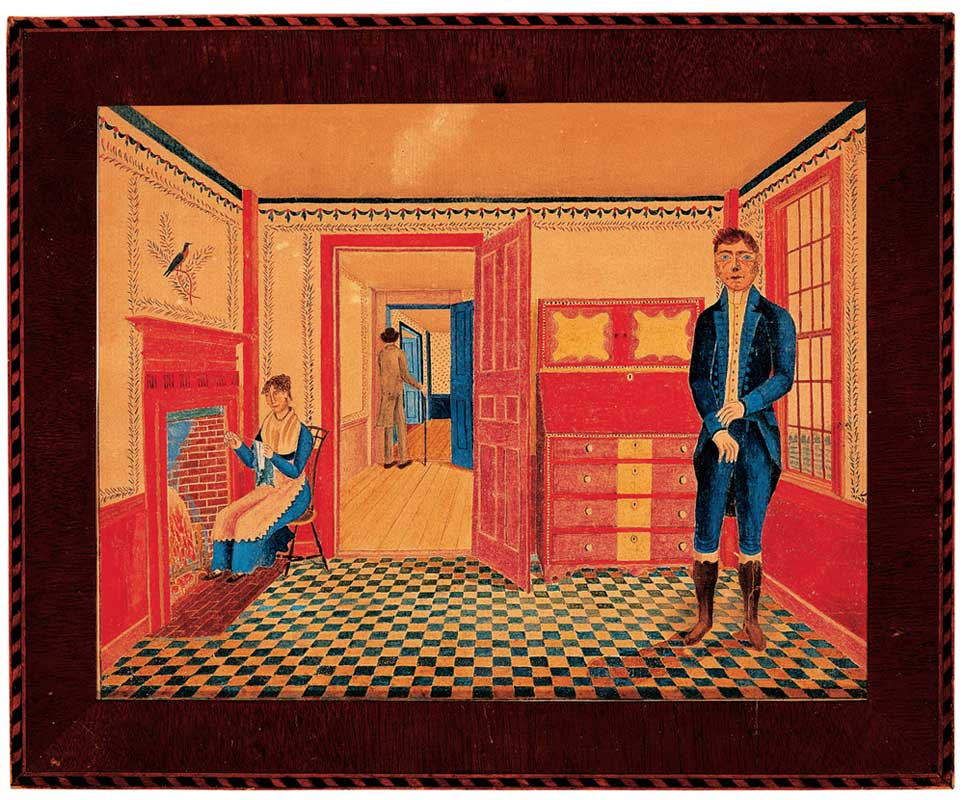
Interior of John Leavitt's Tavern, Joseph Warren Leavitt, Chichester, c. 1825, American Folk Art Museum

Chichester was granted in 1727 to Nathaniel Gookin and others, and was named for Thomas Pelham-Holles, 1st Duke of Newcastle-upon-Tyne, Earl of Chichester and England's Secretary of State for the Southern Department. The first settlement was commenced by Paul Morrill in 1758.

== Geography ==
According to the United States Census Bureau, the town has a total area of 21.3 square miles (55.1 km^{2}), of which 21.2 square miles (54.9 km^{2}) are land and 0.1 square miles (0.3 km^{2}) are water, comprising 0.50% of the town. The highest point in Chichester is an unnamed summit at 1,015 feet (309 m) above sea level, midway between Garvin Hill (985 ft or 300 m) to the east and Plausawa Hill (1,000 ft or 300 m) to the west in neighboring Pembroke. All three summits are less than one mile apart. The west side of Chichester drains to the Soucook River in Loudon, while the east side drains to the Suncook River, which forms the town's northeast border with Pittsfield. Both rivers are tributaries of the Merrimack River.

The town is sparsely populated, with most of the commercial development concentrated along US 202 (Dover Road) and NH 28 (Suncook Valley Road). The civic center of town, with the town hall, Methodist church, and town historical society, lies near the intersection of Main Street, Canterbury Road, and Center Road, about 1/2 mile (0.8 km) northeast of US 202.

=== Adjacent municipalities ===
- Loudon (northwest)
- Pittsfield (northeast)
- Epsom (east)
- Pembroke (south)

== Demographics ==
Historical population
Census	Pop.	Note	%±
1790	491		—
1800	775		57.8%
1810	951		22.7%
1820	1,010		6.2%
1830	1,084		7.3%
1840	1,028		−5.2%
1850	997		−3.0%
1860	1,041		4.4%
1870	871		−16.3%
1880	784		−10.0%
1890	661		−15.7%
1900	598		−9.5%
1910	606		1.3%
1920	507		−16.3%
1930	567		11.8%
1940	587		3.5%
1950	735		25.2%
1960	821		11.7%
1970	1,083		31.9%
1980	1,492		37.8%
1990	1,942		30.2%
2000	2,236		15.1%
2010	2,523		12.8%
2020	2,665		5.6%
U.S. Decennial Census

As of the census of 2000, there were 2,236 people, 823 households, and 637 families residing in the town. The population density was 106.1 inhabitants per square mile (41.0/km^{2}). There were 849 housing units at an average density of 40.3 per square mile (15.6/km^{2}). The racial makeup of the town was 98.17% White, 0.18% African American, 0.36% Native American, 0.13% Asian, 0.18% from other races, and 0.98% from two or more races. Hispanic or Latino of any race were 0.67% of the population.

There were 823 households, out of which 37.2% had children under the age of 18 living with them, 67.6% were married couples living together, 6.6% had a female householder with no husband present, and 22.5% were non-families. 17.1% of all households were made up of individuals, and 6.3% had someone living alone who was 65 years of age or older. The average household size was 2.71 and the average family size was 3.04.

In the town, the population was spread out, with 25.5% under the age of 18, 5.7% from 18 to 24, 33.1% from 25 to 44, 25.7% from 45 to 64, and 10.0% who were 65 years of age or older. The median age was 38 years. For every 100 females, there were 101.8 males. For every 100 females age 18 and over, there were 101.2 males.

The median income for a household in the town was $56,741, and the median income for a family was $60,333. Males had a median income of $38,403 versus $28,051 for females. The per capita income for the town was $24,115. About 2.3% of families and 3.0% of the population were below the poverty line, including 3.2% of those under age 18 and 5.3% of those age 65 or over.

== Transportation ==
Two New Hampshire state routes and two U.S. routes cross Chichester.

- NH 9, U.S. Route 4, and U.S. Route 202 run concurrently through town, connecting the northern part of Pembroke in the west to Epsom in the east. It is known locally as Dover Road.
- NH 28 crosses the eastern edge of town, roughly paralleling the Suncook River, connecting Epsom to Pittsfield along Suncook Valley Road.

== Notable people ==
- Gordon J. Humphrey (born 1940), U.S. senator from 1978 to 1990
- Sally Kelly, member of the New Hampshire House of Representatives
