= Suncook, New Hampshire =

Census-designated place in New Hampshire, United States

- Census-designated place
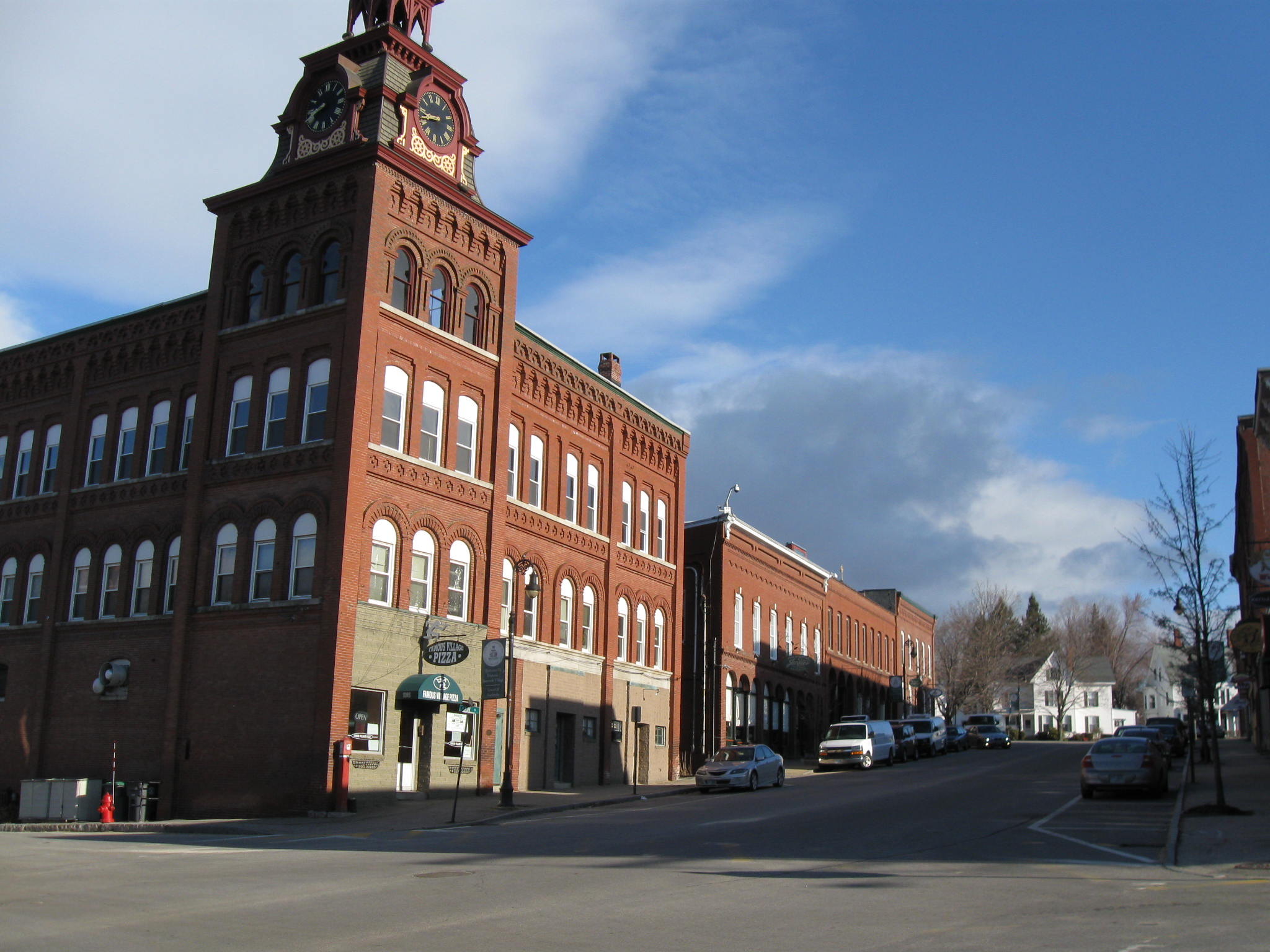
- Center of Suncook village

- Location in Merrimack County and the state of New Hampshire.
- Coordinates: 43°07′51″N 71°27′11″W
- Country: United States
- State: New Hampshire
- County: Merrimack
- Towns: Pembroke, Allenstown

Area
  - Total: 3.91 sq mi (10.12 km^{2})
  - Land: 3.72 sq mi (9.64 km^{2})
  - Water: 0.19 sq mi (0.48 km^{2})
- Elevation: 390 ft (120 m)

Population (2020)
  - Total: 5,501
  - Density: 1,478.0/sq mi (570.66/km^{2})
- Time zone: UTC-5 (Eastern (EST))
  - Summer (DST): UTC-4 (EDT)
- ZIP code: 03275
- Area code: 603
- FIPS code: 33-75140
- GNIS feature ID: 2378092

Suncook is a census-designated place (CDP) in Merrimack County, New Hampshire, United States. The population was 5,501 at the 2020 census. Approximately two-thirds of Suncook is located in the town of Pembroke, with the remainder in Allenstown.

The village of Suncook formed along the falls of the Suncook River, which drops 70 feet (21 m) in one-half mile (1 km) just before joining the Merrimack River. Much of the center of the village is occupied by 19th-century factory buildings which once used the river's energy for hydropower. The buildings have now largely been converted to other uses. Much of Suncook's late 19th-century commercial village center has been listed on the National Register of Historic Places.

Suncook was once home to the Suncook Valley Railroad, a shortline railroad company that operated northwest to Concord and northeast to Barnstead. The railroad operated on former Boston and Maine track that was sold to the company. The Suncook Valley Railroad went bankrupt in 1952 and all its track was torn up.

== Geography ==
Suncook is located in the southern corner of the town of Pembroke and the western end of the town of Allenstown. The Suncook River runs through the center of the village and forms the boundary between the two towns. The CDP is bordered to the south by the town of Hooksett and to the west by the Merrimack River, which forms the Bow town line.

U.S. Route 3 runs through the east side of the CDP, leading northwest 7 miles (11 km) to Concord, the capital of New Hampshire, and south 10 miles (16 km) to Manchester, the state's largest city. New Hampshire Route 28 leads south from Suncook with Route 3 but leads northeast up the Suncook River valley 15 miles (24 km) to Pittsfield.

According to the United States Census Bureau, the Suncook CDP has a total area of 3.9 square miles (10.1 km^{2}), of which 3.7 square miles (9.6 km^{2}) are land and 0.2 square miles (0.5 km^{2}), or 4.75%, are water.

== Demographics ==
Historical population
Census	Pop.	Note	%±
1960	3,807		—
1970	4,280		12.4%
1980	4,698		9.8%
1990	5,214		11.0%
2000	5,362		2.8%
2010	5,379		0.3%
2020	5,501		2.3%
U.S. Decennial Census

=== 2020 census ===
As of the 2020 census, Suncook had a population of 5,501. The median age was 40.9 years. 20.0% of residents were under the age of 18 and 15.5% of residents were 65 years of age or older. For every 100 females there were 93.2 males, and for every 100 females age 18 and over there were 95.6 males age 18 and over.

96.5% of residents lived in urban areas, while 3.5% lived in rural areas.

There were 2,435 households in Suncook, of which 25.5% had children under the age of 18 living in them. Of all households, 41.2% were married-couple households, 19.8% were households with a male householder and no spouse or partner present, and 29.3% were households with a female householder and no spouse or partner present. About 32.8% of all households were made up of individuals and 12.6% had someone living alone who was 65 years of age or older.

There were 2,521 housing units, of which 3.4% were vacant. The homeowner vacancy rate was 0.9% and the rental vacancy rate was 3.6%.

Racial composition as of the 2020 census
Race	Number	Percent
White	5,034	91.5%
Black or African American	56	1.0%
American Indian and Alaska Native	6	0.1%
Asian	47	0.9%
Native Hawaiian and Other Pacific Islander	3	0.1%
Some other race	44	0.8%
Two or more races	311	5.7%
Hispanic or Latino (of any race)	130	2.4%

=== 2010 census ===
As of the census of 2010, the Suncook CDP had a population of 5,379, of whom 3,585 (66.6%) lived in the town of Pembroke and 1,794 (33.4%) lived in the town of Allenstown. There were 2,236 households and 1,375 families residing in the CDP. There were 2,408 housing units, of which 172, or 7.1%, were vacant. The racial makeup of the CDP was 95.9% white, 0.9% African American, 0.4% Native American, 0.9% Asian, 0.02% Pacific Islander, 0.4% some other race, and 1.6% from two or more races. 1.8% of the population were Hispanic or Latino of any race.

Of the 2,236 households in the CDP, 30.9% had children under the age of 18 living with them, 43.8% were headed by married couples living together, 12.3% had a female householder with no husband present, and 38.5% were non-families. 29.7% of all households were made up of individuals, and 9.4% were someone living alone who was 65 years of age or older. The average household size was 2.38, and the average family size was 2.95.

22.9% of residents in the CDP were under the age of 18, 7.4% were from age 18 to 24, 28.7% were from 25 to 44, 28.2% were from 45 to 64, and 13.0% were 65 years of age or older. The median age was 39.0 years. For every 100 females, there were 90.7 males. For every 100 females age 18 and over, there were 89.0 males.

=== Income and poverty ===
For the period 2011–15, the estimated median annual income for a household was $56,181, and the median income for a family was $78,814. Male full-time workers had a median income of $45,154 versus $43,118 for females. The per capita income for the CDP was $26,148. 10.7% of the population and 5.9% of families were below the poverty line, along with 10.6% of people under the age of 18 and 7.1% of people 65 or older.

== See also ==
- 1922 New England Textile Strike
