= Suncook River =

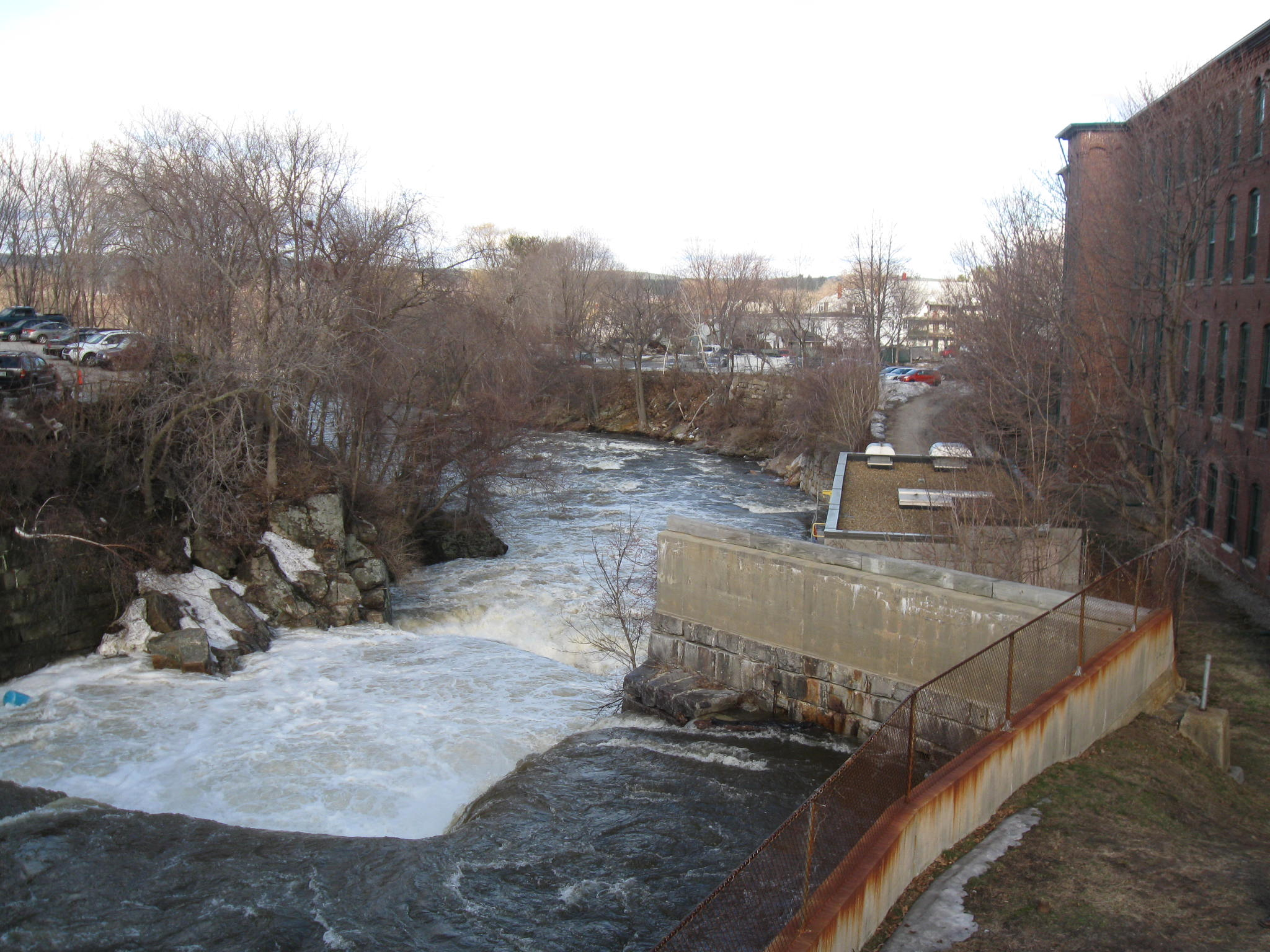
- The Suncook River in the center of Suncook, NH

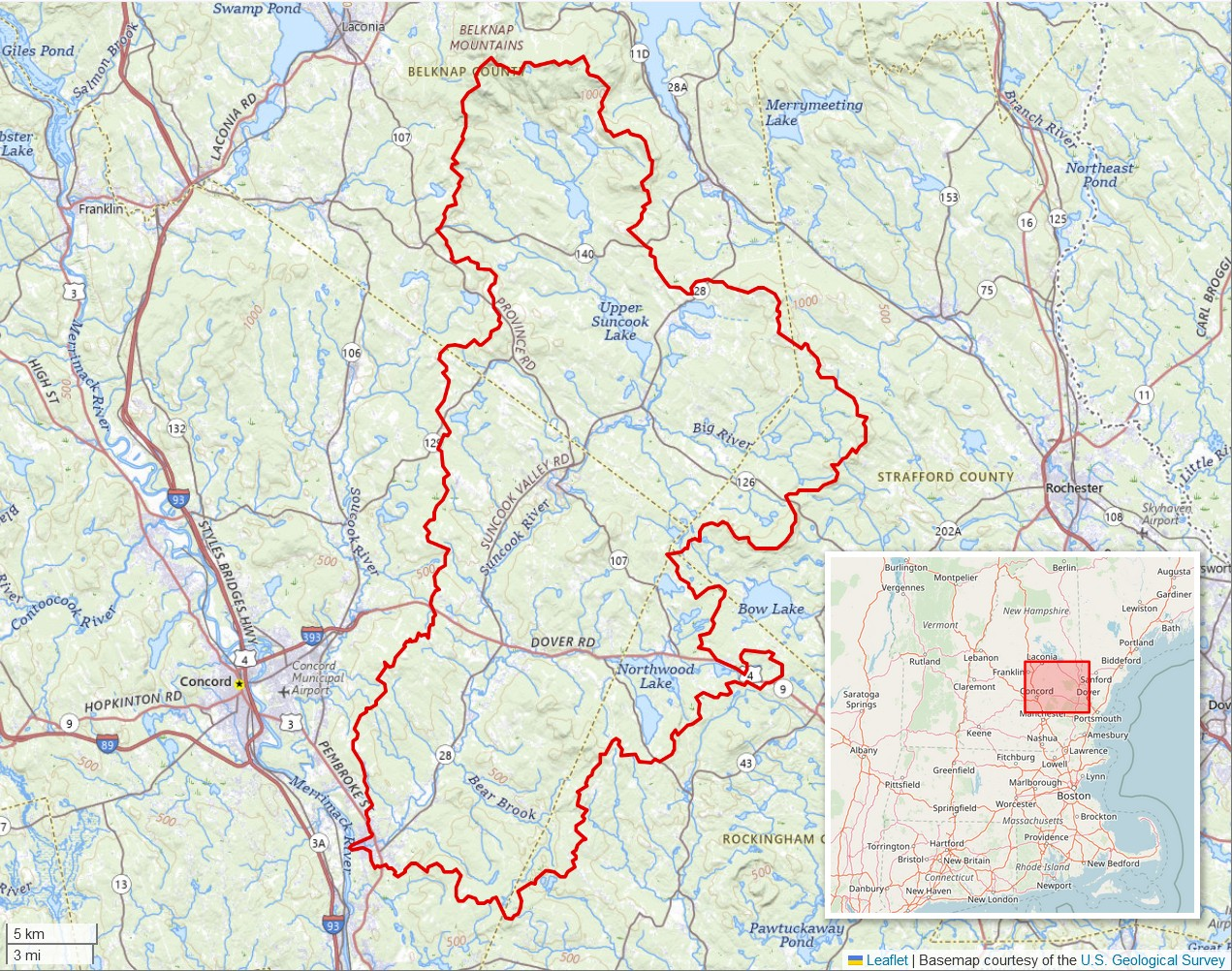
- Suncook River watershed (Interactive map)

Location
- Country: United States
- State: New Hampshire
- Counties: Belknap, Merrimack
- Towns: Gilmanton, Barnstead, Pittsfield, Chichester, Epsom, Pembroke, Allenstown

Physical characteristics
- Source: Crystal Lake
  - location: Gilmanton Ironworks
  - coordinates: 43°26′9″N 71°18′13″W
  - elevation: 623 ft (190 m)
- Mouth: Merrimack River
  - location: Suncook
  - coordinates: 43°7′39″N 71°27′50″W
  - elevation: 195 ft (59 m)
- Length: 35.7 mi (57.5 km)
- Basin size: 660 km^{2} (250 mi^{2})

Basin features
- Tributaries
  - left: Webster Stream, Big River, Crooked Run, Little Suncook River, Bear Brook, Boat Meadow Brook
  - right: Kelley Brook, Perry Brook

The Suncook River is a 35.7-mile-long (57.5 km) river located in central New Hampshire in the United States. It is a tributary of the Merrimack River, which flows to the Gulf of Maine.

== Course ==
The Suncook River begins at the outlet of Crystal Lake in the town of Gilmanton, New Hampshire. The village of Gilmanton Ironworks is located at the lake's outlet. The Suncook flows south two miles to the Suncook Lakes (Upper and Lower) in Barnstead. Below the lakes, the river passes through the village of Center Barnstead and enters the town of Pittsfield, whose village is centered on a 19th century dam on the river.

The river continues south through the towns of Chichester and Epsom, and then forms the town boundary between Pembroke and Allenstown. Shortly before reaching the Merrimack River, the Suncook drops 70 feet (21 m) in 0.5 miles (0.80 km), a natural waterpower site that led to the growth of the village of Suncook.

== 2006 flood ==
On May 16, 2006, the Suncook River, responding to the highest rainfall amounts in at least 70 years (more than 8 inches (200 mm) dropped by a low-pressure system in three days on Concord, New Hampshire), rose to flood level and backed up behind an old mill dam, which produced a shallowly sloping pool that overtopped a sand and gravel quarry, connected with a downstream section of channel, and cut a new shorter channel at 25–50 meters per hour in the town of Epsom. Two previous channels, around Bear Island, were left dry. The new river course, approximately a mile long, is the largest channel change in a river in New Hampshire since systematic topographic mapping began in the state in the early 20th century.

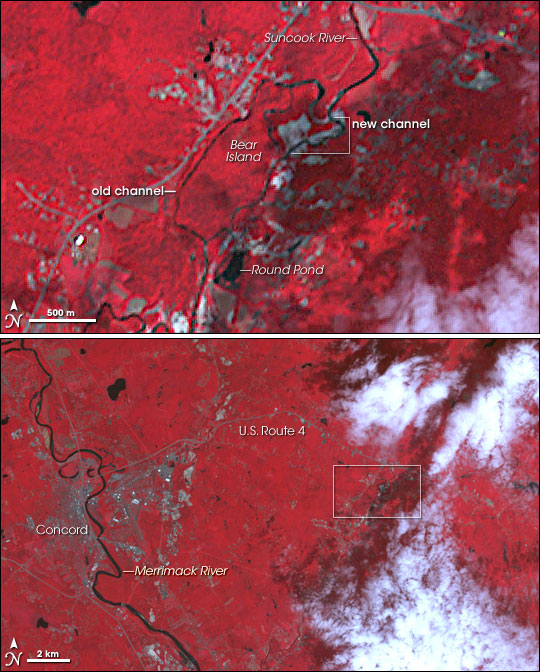
The old and new channels of the Suncook River, as seen from space

On September 3, 2018, there was news that work had begun to stabilize the Suncook River in its new course.

== Artistic tributes ==
In 1934, the American composer Alan Hovhaness (1911–2000), who spent time with his maternal family members in Pittsfield, New Hampshire, during his youth, wrote a fantasy for cello and piano entitled Legend of the Sunkook [sic] Valley (Op. 1, no. 4).

== See also ==
- List of rivers of New Hampshire
