= Suncook Lakes =

Pair of lakes located in Belknap County

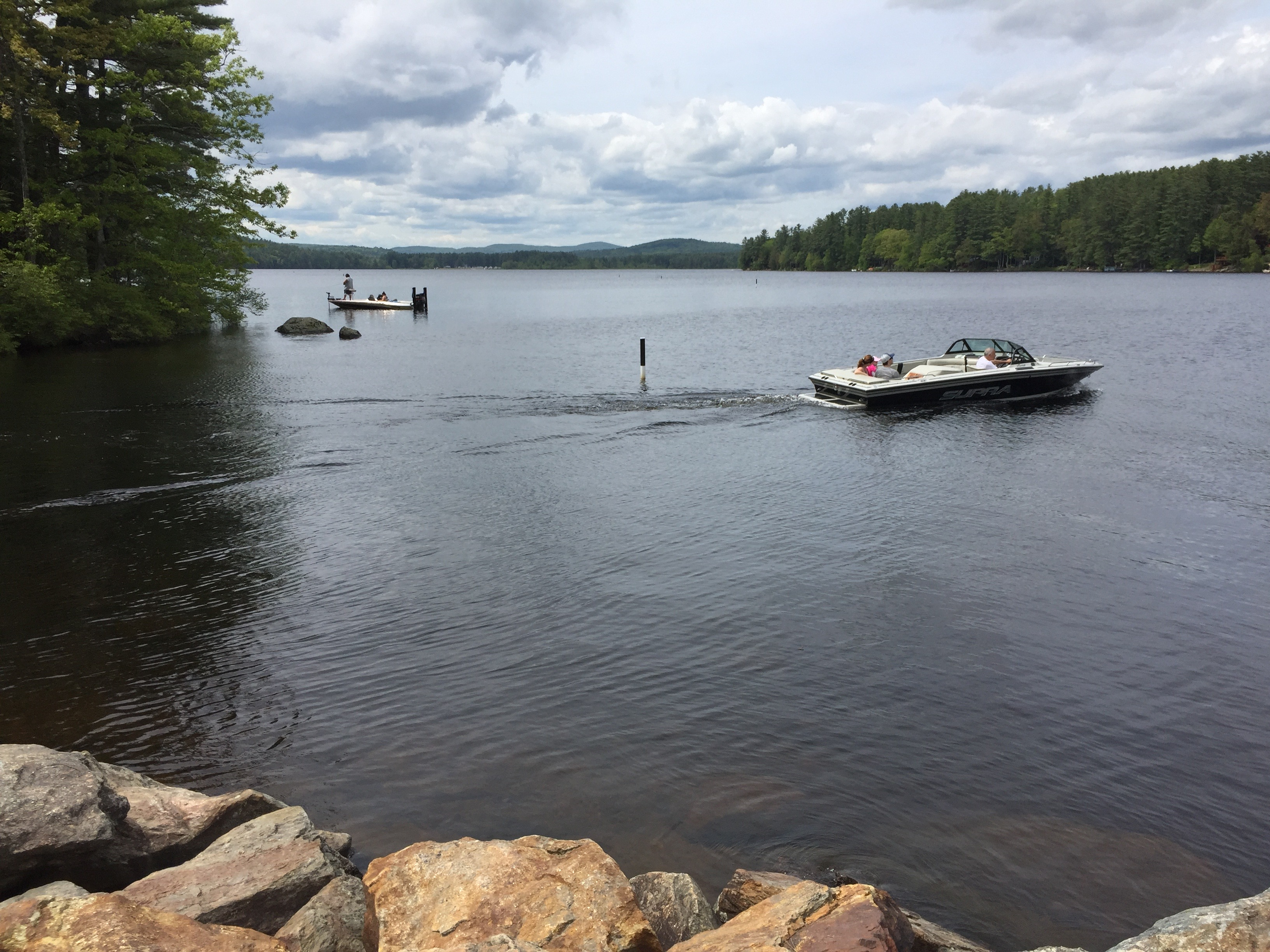
- Upper Suncook Lake from Narrows Road, May 2017

- Location within New Hampshire Location within the United States
- Location: Belknap County, New Hampshire
- Coordinates: 43°22′54″N 71°16′31″W
- Primary inflows: Suncook River
- Primary outflows: Suncook River
- Basin countries: United States
- Max. length: 3.2 mi (5.1 km)
- Max. width: 0.7 mi (1.1 km)
- Surface area: 697 acres (2.82 km^{2})
- Surface elevation: 551 ft (168 m)
- Islands: 3
- Settlements: Barnstead

The Suncook Lakes are a pair of lakes located in Belknap County in central New Hampshire, United States, in the town of Barnstead. Upper Suncook Lake encompasses 402 acres (1.63 km^{2}), while Lower Suncook Lake covers 295 acres (1.19 km^{2}). The lakes are connected by a 1,000-foot-long (300 m) channel, spanned by a road bridge. A dam at the outlet of Lower Suncook Lake controls the water level of both lakes. The lakes are located along the Suncook River, a tributary of the Merrimack River. There are three islands on Lower Lake.

Lower Suncook Lake has an average depth of 9 feet (2.7 m) and a maximum depth of 16 feet (4.9 m), while Upper Suncook Lake has a greater average depth and a maximum depth greater than 40 feet (12 m). The lakes are classified as a warmwater fishery, with observed species including smallmouth and largemouth bass, chain pickerel, horned pout, and white perch. Rainbow trout can be found in the deeper Upper Suncook Lake.

== See also ==
- List of lakes in New Hampshire
