= Pembroke, New Hampshire =

- Town
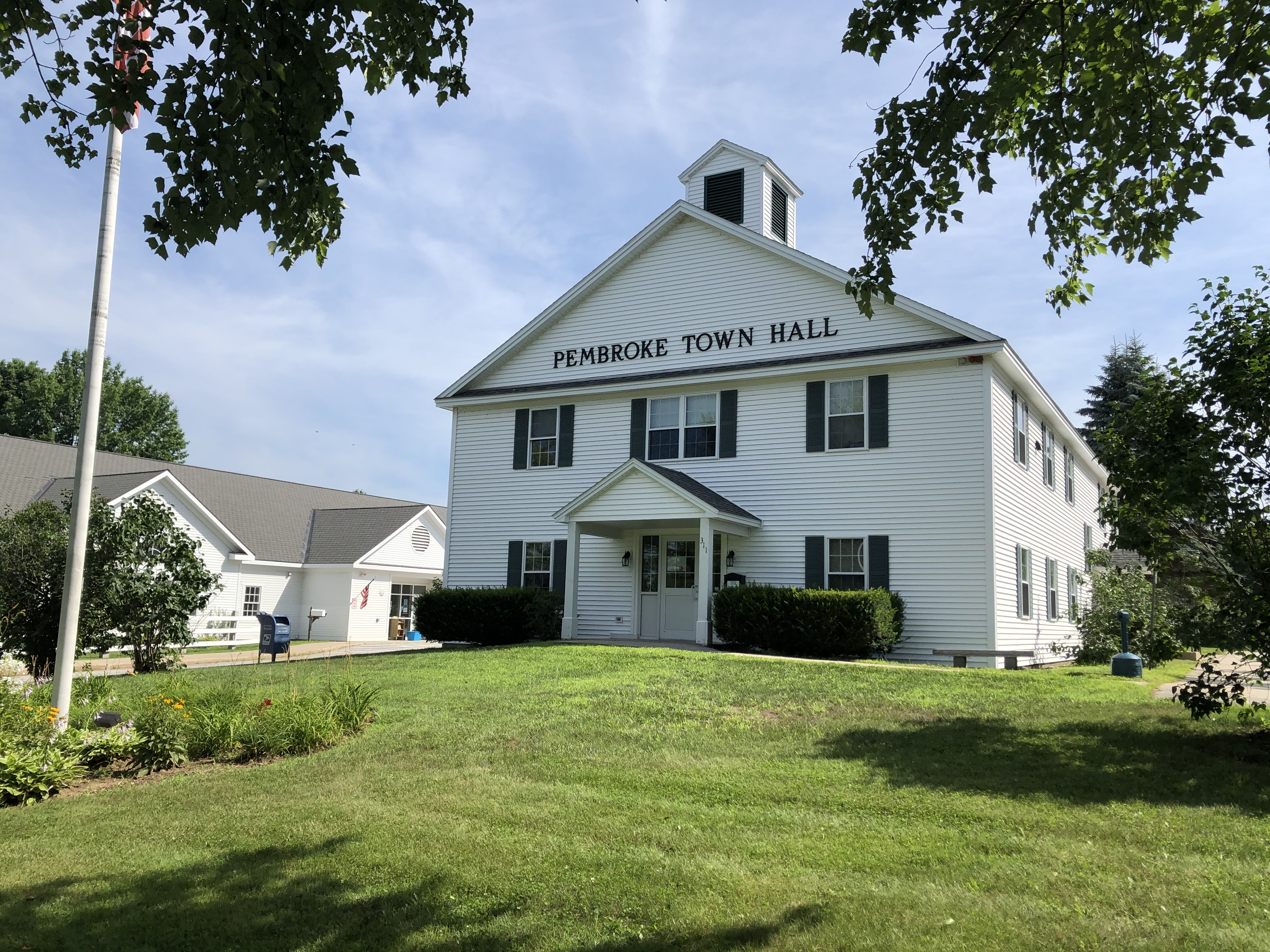
- Town Hall in 2020

- Seal
- Motto: "Prosper in Pembroke"
- Location in Merrimack County and the state of New Hampshire.
- Coordinates: 43°10′49″N 71°27′0″W
- Country: United States
- State: New Hampshire
- County: Merrimack
- Incorporated: 1759
- Villages: Pembroke; North Pembroke; Pembroke Hill; Suncook (part)

Area
  - Total: 22.8 sq mi (59.1 km^{2})
  - Land: 22.6 sq mi (58.6 km^{2})
  - Water: 0.19 sq mi (0.5 km^{2}) 0.76%
- Elevation: 554 ft (169 m)

Population (2020)
  - Total: 7,207
  - Density: 318/sq mi (122.9/km^{2})
- Time zone: UTC−5 (Eastern)
  - Summer (DST): UTC−4 (Eastern)
- ZIP Code: 03275
- Area code: 603
- FIPS code: 33-60020
- GNIS feature ID: 873696
- Website: www.pembroke-nh.com

Pembroke is a town in Merrimack County, New Hampshire, United States. The population was 7,207 at the 2020 census. Pembroke includes part of the village of Suncook. The center of population of New Hampshire is close to the Pembroke town center.

== History ==
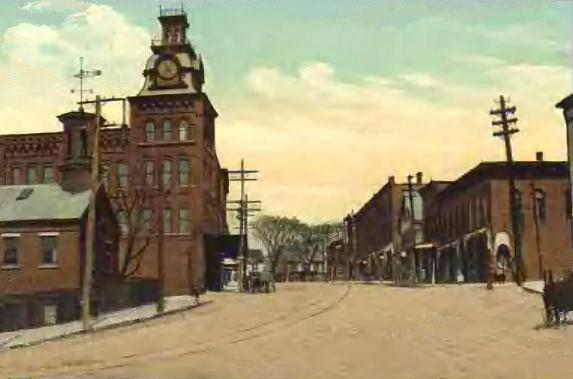
Main Street in Suncook, c. 1910

First granted in 1728, the town was known as "Lovewell's Town", in honor of Captain John Lovewell, who built the stockade at Ossipee. Shortly afterward, the town took the name of "Suncook", the Pennacook Abenaki name for the river flowing through the area. When the town was incorporated in 1759 by colonial Governor Benning Wentworth, it was given the name "Pembroke" in honor of Henry Herbert, ninth Earl of Pembroke in southern Wales.

Pembroke's early history is reflected in the various mills of the downtown area, located to use water power from the Suncook River. The better-known mills were the Pembroke Mills, Webster Manufacturing, and China Manufacturing, all producing print cloth. Pembroke industries included brickmaking, with bricks manufactured from clay along the Merrimack River. In 1852, the Concord and Portsmouth Railroad established a station in Pembroke.

== Geography ==
According to the United States Census Bureau, the town has a total area of 22.8 square miles (59.1 km^{2}), of which 22.6 square miles (58.6 km^{2}) are land and 0.2 square miles (0.5 km^{2}) are water, comprising 0.76% of the town. Pembroke is drained by the Merrimack River and its tributaries, the Suncook and the Soucook. The Merrimack River forms the southwest border of the town, the Soucook forms the northwest border, and the Suncook forms the southeast border. The highest point in town, Plausawa Hill, elevation 1,000 feet (305 m) above sea level, is in the north.

=== Adjacent municipalities ===
- Loudon (north)
- Chichester (north)
- Epsom (northeast)
- Allenstown (southeast)
- Bow (southwest)
- Concord (northwest)

== Demographics ==
Historical population
Census	Pop.	Note	%±
1790	956		—
1800	982		2.7%
1810	1,153		17.4%
1820	1,256		8.9%
1830	1,312		4.5%
1840	1,336		1.8%
1850	1,733		29.7%
1860	1,313		−24.2%
1870	2,518		91.8%
1880	2,797		11.1%
1890	3,172		13.4%
1900	3,183		0.3%
1910	3,062		−3.8%
1920	2,563		−16.3%
1930	2,792		8.9%
1940	2,769		−0.8%
1950	3,094		11.7%
1960	3,514		13.6%
1970	4,261		21.3%
1980	4,861		14.1%
1990	6,561		35.0%
2000	6,897		5.1%
2010	7,115		3.2%
2020	7,207		1.3%
U.S. Decennial Census

As of the census of 2000, there were 6,897 people, 2,661 households, and 1,876 families residing in the town. The population density was 302.1 inhabitants per square mile (116.6/km^{2}). There were 2,734 housing units at an average density of 119.8 per square mile (46.3/km^{2}). The racial makeup of the town was 97.84% White, 0.38% African American, 0.26% Native American, 0.38% Asian, 0.03% from other races, and 1.12% from two or more races. Hispanic or Latino of any race were 0.43% of the population.

There were 2,661 households, out of which 37.3% had children under the age of 18 living with them, 55.7% were married couples living together, 10.4% had a female householder with no husband present, and 29.5% were non-families. 23.0% of all households were made up of individuals, and 7.3% had someone living alone who was 65 years of age or older. The average household size was 2.59 and the average family size was 3.06.

In the town, the population was spread out, with 26.9% under the age of 18, 6.9% from 18 to 24, 33.1% from 25 to 44, 23.1% from 45 to 64, and 9.9% who were 65 years of age or older. The median age was 37 years. For every 100 females, there were 98.3 males. For every 100 females age 18 and over, there were 94.5 males.

The median income for a household in the town was $49,494, and the median income for a family was $57,106. Males had a median income of $37,786 versus $26,781 for females. The per capita income for the town was $20,800. About 3.0% of families and 5.4% of the population were below the poverty line, including 3.2% of those under age 18 and 10.9% of those age 65 or over.

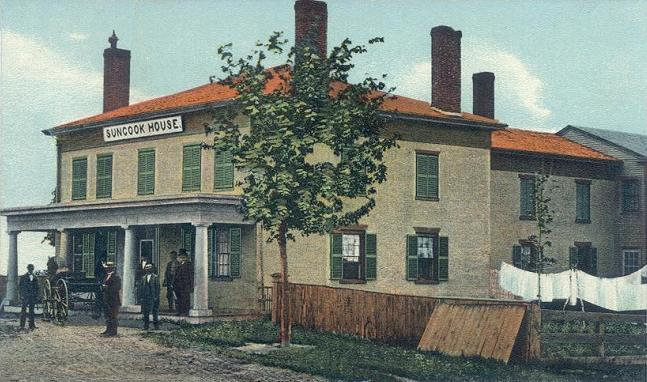
Suncook House c. 1907

== Transportation ==
Three New Hampshire state routes, one Interstate Highway, and three U.S. routes cross Pembroke.

- NH 9 crosses the narrow salient at the northern edge of town between Concord in the west and Chichester in the east. It merges with US 4/US 202 at the end of the I-393 freeway just before entering Chichester. It is known locally as Loudon Road.
- NH 28 crosses a small portion of northeastern Pembroke. It enters from Allenstown in the south, follows the Suncook River along its western bank, then crosses into Epsom in the north. It is locally known as Pinewood Road.
- NH 106 begins at an interchange with US 3 between the village of Suncook and the Concord line. It heads north and crosses the Soucook River into Concord.
- US 3 enters from the south in the village of Suncook from Allenstown after crossing the Suncook River. It follows Pembroke Street to the northwest before crossing the Soucook River into Concord.
- US 4 and US 202 enter the narrow salient at the northern edge of town from Concord along the I-393 freeway, then merge with NH 9 before the three concurrent routes enter Chichester.
- I-393 terminates shortly after entering the narrow salient at the northern edge of town from Concord. The roadway continues on as NH 9/US 4/US 202.

== Education ==
There are currently three public schools in Pembroke. The Hill School is attended by children in kindergarten through fourth grades. Three Rivers School, named after the three rivers that form most of the borders of the town, was built in the early 1990s and contains fifth through eighth grade. The town's high school is Pembroke Academy, founded in 1818 as a private school. Now a public school, Pembroke Academy takes students from Pembroke and from the neighboring towns of Allenstown, Epsom, Chichester, and historically, Deerfield. With approximately 850 students, the school is Division II in athletics, the second-highest class, and the mascot of the school is the Spartan.

== Pembroke Town Library ==
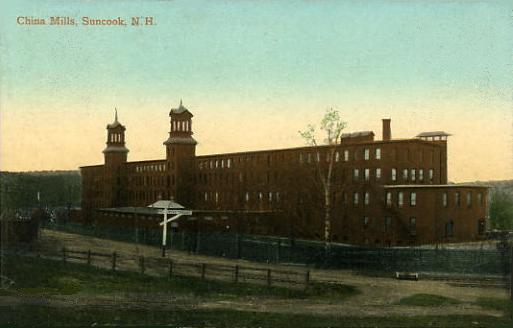
China Mills in 1909

The first lending library in Pembroke was not a tax-supported public library in the modern sense. It was a proprietary library of the type seen throughout New England in the late 1700s and early 1800s. Incorporated on December 7, 1798, as the Proprietors of the Pembroke Library, this organization purchased its books through "assessments" or taxes levied each year on its shareholders, who were the only people permitted to borrow its books.

The Pembroke Town Library, the town's first tax-supported public library, was born when the New Hampshire legislature passed some of the nation's most progressive library laws in the 1890s. An innovative law of 1891 required the state to assist towns that voted to establish a tax-supported, free public library. To get the local library established, the state gave such towns $100 worth of books and professional guidance in librarianship. In 1895, the legislature passed a law, the first of its kind in the nation, requiring each town to appropriate funds to establish a public library and to appoint a board of library trustees unless the electorate voted each year specifically not to do so.

The law of 1895 spurred the founding of the Pembroke Town Library in 1896. New town libraries of the period were often housed in any available room, and Pembroke's library was no exception. After a series of locations, the library planning for a proper library building resumed in June 1997. The building was dedicated on June 14, 2003.

Summary of library locations:

1896–1923	(27 years)	Knox Tailor Shop, Baker's Block, 11 Glass Street
1923–1937	(14 years)	Another storefront in Baker's Block, 15 Glass Street
1837–1981	(44 years)	136 Main Street
1981–2003	(22 years)	Marston House, 261 Pembroke Street
2003		New Pembroke Town Library Building

== Notable people ==
- Robert E. Cochran (1810–1836), Alamo defender, born in Pembroke
- Byron M. Cutcheon (1836–1908), American Civil War officer, U.S. congressman
- Bill Field (1926–2022), member of the New Hampshire House of Representatives
- Brian Foster (born 1987), ice hockey goaltender
- Thomas W. Knox (1835–1896), journalist, New York Herald correspondent
- Joseph LaPage, serial killer
- Megan McTavish (born 1949), soap opera writer; Daytime Emmy winner
- Caleb Scofield (1978–2018), bassist, with alternative metal band Cave In
- Caleb Stark (1759–1838), Revolutionary War-era officer; son of Gen. John Stark
