= New Hampshire Route 107 =

State highway in eastern New Hampshire, US

New Hampshire Route 107
- Map of eastern New Hampshire with NH 107 highlighted in red

Route information
- Maintained by NHDOT
- Length: 69.108 mi (111.219 km)

Major junctions
- South end: US 1 in Seabrook
- I-95 in Seabrook; NH 111 / NH 125 in Kingston; NH 101 in Raymond; US 4 / US 202 / NH 9 in Northwood; US 3 / NH 11 in Laconia
- North end: US 3 in Laconia

Location
- Country: United States
- State: New Hampshire
- Counties: Rockingham, Merrimack, Belknap

Highway system
- New Hampshire Highway System; Interstate; US; State; Turnpikes
| ← NH 106 | → NH 108 |

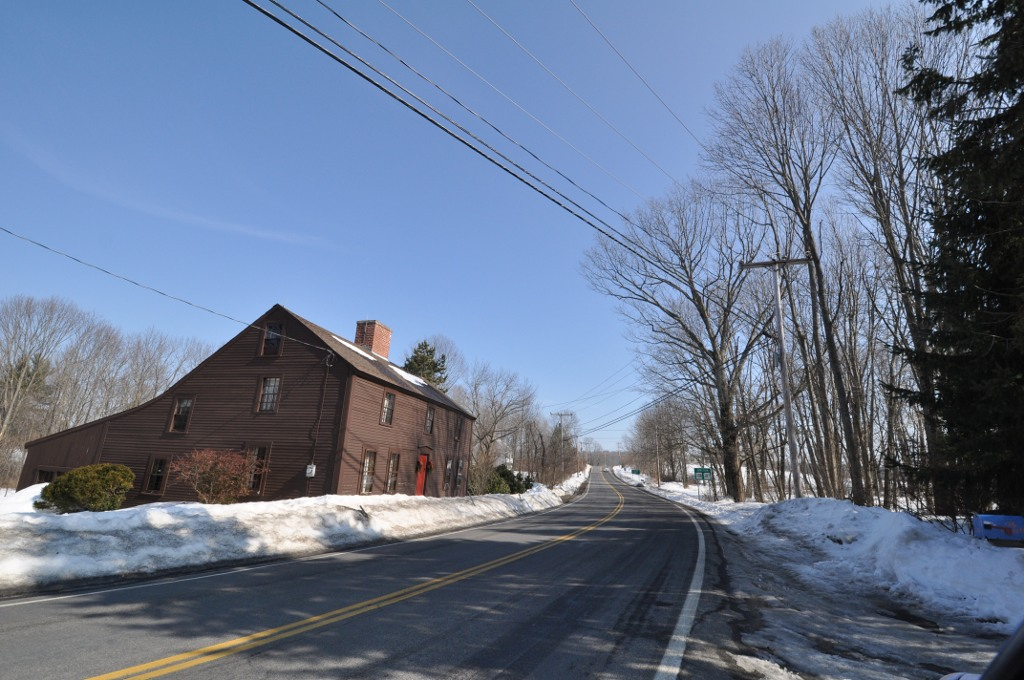
Concurrent NH 107 and 108 looking east in East Kingston

New Hampshire Route 107 is a 69.108-mile-long (111.219 km) north–south state highway in eastern New Hampshire. It connects Laconia in the Lakes Region with Seabrook on the Atlantic coast. The southern terminus of NH 107 is at U.S. Route 1 in Seabrook near the entrance to Seabrook Station Nuclear Power Plant. The northern terminus is at U.S. Route 3 on the Laconia/Gilford town line.

The highway is signed north-south, but follows a more southeast-to-northwest alignment. Although the route stretches for almost 70 miles (110 km), NH 107 essentially exists as a series of smaller segments connected by short concurrencies with other routes.

NH 107 between US 3 and Leavitt Road in Laconia is part of the Timberman 70.3 Triathlon bicycle course.

== Route description ==
=== Seabrook to Kingston ===
NH 107 begins at US 1 in Seabrook, just 1.5 miles (2.4 km) north of the Massachusetts state line, and initially travels nearly due west (signed north). The highway interchanges with Interstate 95 0.2 miles (0.3 km) to the west then continues west into the town of Kensington. NH 107 crosses NH 150 and traverses the southern part of Kensington before continuing into East Kingston where it meets NH 108. NH 108 turns onto NH 107, sharing pavement briefly before splitting off to the south. Continuing west into Kingston, NH 107 intersects the northern terminus of NH 107A (its only "child" route) before meeting NH 111 and NH 125. NH 107 turns north onto NH 111 / NH 125, and the three routes overlap for just over 1 mile (1.6 km), then NH 111 splits off to the east. NH 107 continues along NH 125 for another 0.5 miles (0.8 km) before it splits off on its own again.

=== Kingston to Northwood ===
NH 107 cuts across the southwestern corner of Brentwood, then crosses the Exeter River into Fremont and intersects with NH 111A. The two routes overlap for 1.8 miles (2.9 km) before NH 111A splits off to the south. NH 107 continues along the river until crossing into Raymond. The highway intersects the eastern terminus of NH 102 before turning due north. NH 107 crosses the Lamprey River and interchanges with NH 101 before intersecting with NH 27 east of downtown. NH 107 turns west onto NH 27, and NH 156, a short connector to Nottingham, splits off to the north. NH 27 and NH 107 continue along the Lamprey River for 3.9 miles (6.3 km) before splitting in the western end of town. NH 107 turns north to continue along the Lamprey River into the town of Deerfield, where it intersects with NH 43. NH 43 and NH 107 overlap for 3.5 miles (5.6 km) in Deerfield and split north of the town center. The highway continues northwest into Epsom where it intersects with US 4, US 202 and NH 9 in the eastern end of town. NH 107 turns east to join them, and the four routes run concurrently along the north side of Northwood Lake for 2 miles (3 km), crossing into the town of Northwood along the way. NH 107 splits off and continues northwest into Pittsfield.

=== Pittsfield to Belmont ===
NH 107 crosses the town of Pittsfield through windy, hilly terrain before reaching the downtown area. In downtown Pittsfield, the highway turns north and crosses NH 28 before continuing north and crossing into the town of Barnstead. The highway runs briefly through the western corner of the town before continuing northwest into Gilmanton, where it meets the eastern terminus of NH 129, a connector to Loudon to the southwest. NH 107 continues northwest through more hilly terrain for several miles, then crosses NH 140 in the town center. Continuing north, NH 107 traverses the eastern corner of Belmont before entering the city of Laconia.

=== Laconia ===
NH 107 has a partial interchange with the Gilford-Laconia Bypass (US 3 / NH 11); full access is available via NH 106 0.6 miles (0.97 km) to the north. NH 107 joins NH 106 northbound into downtown Laconia via South Main Street. NH 106 and NH 107 intersect with NH 11A (unsigned US 3 Business) in the city's center, near the Winnipesaukee River. NH 107 turns onto NH 11A (Union Avenue) for 0.9 miles (1.4 km), then NH 11A splits off east towards the US 3 / NH 11 bypass. NH 107 (and US 3 Business) continue north on Union Avenue, paralleling Opechee and Paugus bays before reaching its northern terminus at US 3 (Lake Street/Lake Shore Road) at the Laconia/Gilford line (US 3 Business also ends here).

== History ==
From Laconia to Barnstead, Route 107 is part of the Old Province Road, the first "farm to market" road in New Hampshire. Province Road was planned in 1763 to divert crops from being shipped down the Connecticut River from the Haverhill area, then called "Little Co-os", and instead have them brought to the Durham area. Province Road began the great era of roadbuilding in New Hampshire, a dream of Governor John Wentworth, which had to wait until the end of the French and Indian Wars.

== Major intersections ==
| County | Location | mi | km | Destinations | Notes |
|---|---|---|---|---|---|
| Rockingham | Seabrook | 0.000 | 0.000 | US 1 (Lafayette Road) – Hampton, Salisbury, MA | Southern terminus |
| Rockingham | Seabrook | 0.206– 0.616 | 0.332– 0.991 | I-95 – Hampton, Portsmouth, Salisbury, Boston | Exit 1 on I-95 |
| Rockingham | Kensington | 3.075 | 4.949 | NH 150 (Amesbury Road) – South Hampton, Exeter | |
| Rockingham | East Kingston | 7.335 | 11.805 | NH 108 north (North Road) – Exeter | Southern end of NH 108 concurrency |
| Rockingham | East Kingston | 7.724 | 12.431 | NH 108 south (Haverhill Road) – Newton | Northern end of NH 108 concurrency |
| Rockingham | Kingston | 9.563 | 15.390 | NH 107A south (Powwow River Road) – South Hampton | Northern terminus of NH 107A |
| Rockingham | Kingston | 9.620 | 15.482 | NH 111 west / NH 125 south – Plaistow | Southern end of NH 111/NH 125 concurrency |
| Rockingham | Kingston | 10.663 | 17.160 | NH 111 east (Exeter Road) – Exeter | Northern end of NH 111 concurrency |
| Rockingham | Kingston | 11.195 | 18.017 | NH 125 north – Epping | Northern end of NH 125 concurrency |
| Rockingham | Fremont | 13.475 | 21.686 | NH 111A east (Brentwood Road) – Brentwood, Exeter | Southern end of NH 111A concurrency |
| Rockingham | Fremont | 15.252 | 24.546 | NH 111A west (Danville Road) – Danville | Northern end of NH 111A concurrency |
| Rockingham | Raymond | 18.908 | 30.429 | NH 102 west (Chester Road) – Derry, Nashua | Eastern terminus of NH 102 |
| Rockingham | Raymond | 19.621– 19.997 | 31.577– 32.182 | NH 101 – Portsmouth, Manchester | Exit 5 on NH 101 |
| Rockingham | Raymond | 20.447 | 32.906 | NH 27 east – Epping | Southern end of NH 27 concurrency |
| Rockingham | Raymond | 20.551 | 33.074 | NH 156 north (Nottingham Road) – Nottingham | Southern terminus of NH 156 |
| Rockingham | Raymond | 24.367 | 39.215 | NH 27 west – Candia | Northern end of NH 27 concurrency |
| Rockingham | Deerfield | 28.173 | 45.340 | NH 43 south (Stage Road) – Candia | Southern end of NH 43 concurrency |
| Rockingham | Deerfield | 31.663 | 50.957 | NH 43 north (Mountain View Road) – Northwood | Northern end of NH 43 concurrency |
| Merrimack | Epsom | 37.409 | 60.204 | US 4 west / US 202 west / NH 9 west (Dover Road / Franklin Pierce Highway) – Concord | Southern end of US 4/US 202/NH 9 concurrency |
| Rockingham | Northwood | 39.462 | 63.508 | US 4 east / US 202 east / NH 9 east (First New Hampshire Turnpike / Franklin Pierce Highway) – Portsmouth, Dover | Northern end of US 4/US 202/NH 9 concurrency |
| Merrimack | Pittsfield | 48.166 | 77.516 | NH 28 (Suncook Valley Road) – Epsom, Alton | |
| Belknap | Gilmanton | 52.741 | 84.878 | NH 129 west – Loudon | Eastern terminus of NH 129 |
| Belknap | Gilmanton | 58.127 | 93.546 | NH 140 (Alton–Belmont Road) – Belmont, Gilmanton Ironworks, Alton | |
| Belknap | Laconia | 64.932– 65.020 | 104.498– 104.640 | US 3 north / NH 11 east (Daniel Webster Highway / Laconia–Gilford Bypass) – Gilford, Meredith, Alton | Interchange |
| Belknap | Laconia | 65.610 | 105.589 | NH 106 south (Belmont Road) – Belmont, Concord | Southern end of NH 106 concurrency |
| Belknap | Laconia | 66.155 | 106.466 | NH 106 north (Main Street) – Meredith NH 11A west / US 3 Bus. south (Court Street) | Northern end of NH 106 concurrency; southern end of NH 11A/US 3 Bus. concurrency |
| Belknap | Laconia | 66.729 | 107.390 | NH 11A east (Gilford Avenue) – Gunstock Rec. Area | Northern end of NH 11A concurrency |
| Belknap | Laconia | 69.108 | 111.219 | US 3 – Weirs Beach, Meredith, Gilford, Alton | Northern terminus |
1.000 mi = 1.609 km; 1.000 km = 0.621 mi: Concurrency terminus

== Concurrent routes ==
- New Hampshire Route 108: 0.39 miles (0.63 km), East Kingston
- New Hampshire Route 111: 1.04 miles (1.67 km), Kingston
- New Hampshire Route 125: 1.57 miles (2.53 km), Kingston
- New Hampshire Route 111A: 1.78 miles (2.86 km), Fremont
- New Hampshire Route 27: 3.92 miles (6.31 km), Raymond
- New Hampshire Route 43: 3.49 miles (5.62 km), Deerfield
- U.S. Route 4 / U.S. Route 202 / New Hampshire Route 9: 2.06 miles (3.32 km), Epsom to Northwood
- New Hampshire Route 106: 0.54 miles (0.87 km), Laconia
- New Hampshire Route 11A: 0.57 miles (0.92 km), Laconia
- U.S. Route 3 Business (unsigned): 2.95 miles (4.75 km), Laconia

== Suffixed routes ==
New Hampshire Route 107A
- Location: South Hampton–Kingston
- Length: 6.349 mi (10.218 km)

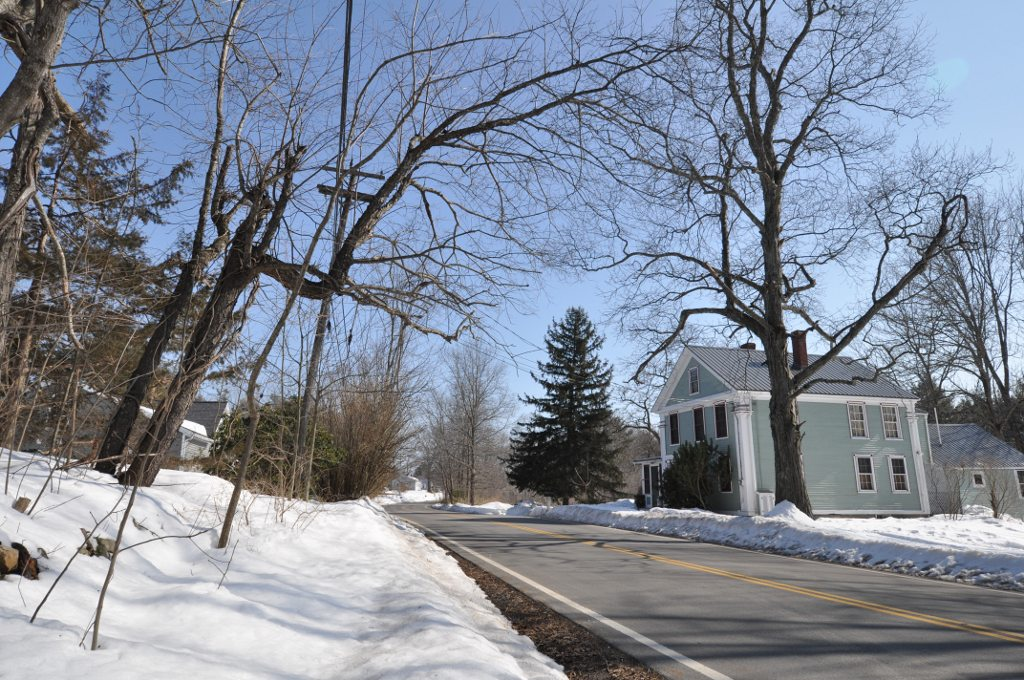
NH 107A in the Smith's Corner part of northwestern South Hampton

New Hampshire Route 107A is a 6.34-mile (10.20 km) long north–south highway in Rockingham County. The southern terminus of the route is at the Massachusetts state line in South Hampton, where South Hampton Road continues unnumbered into Amesbury, Massachusetts. The northern terminus is at NH 107 in Kingston.

NH 107A begins at the Massachusetts border in South Hampton as Main Avenue. The road progresses to the northwest, becoming Burnt Swamp Road at the town line. The name remains the same to an intersection with NH 108, where NH 107A becomes Powwow River Road. In Kingston NH 107A turns to the north a short distance ahead of its northern terminus at NH 107, a few yards east of the junction of NH 107 and NH 111 / NH 125.
