= Centre Congregational Church =

Historic church in New Hampshire, United States

- U.S. National Register of Historic Places
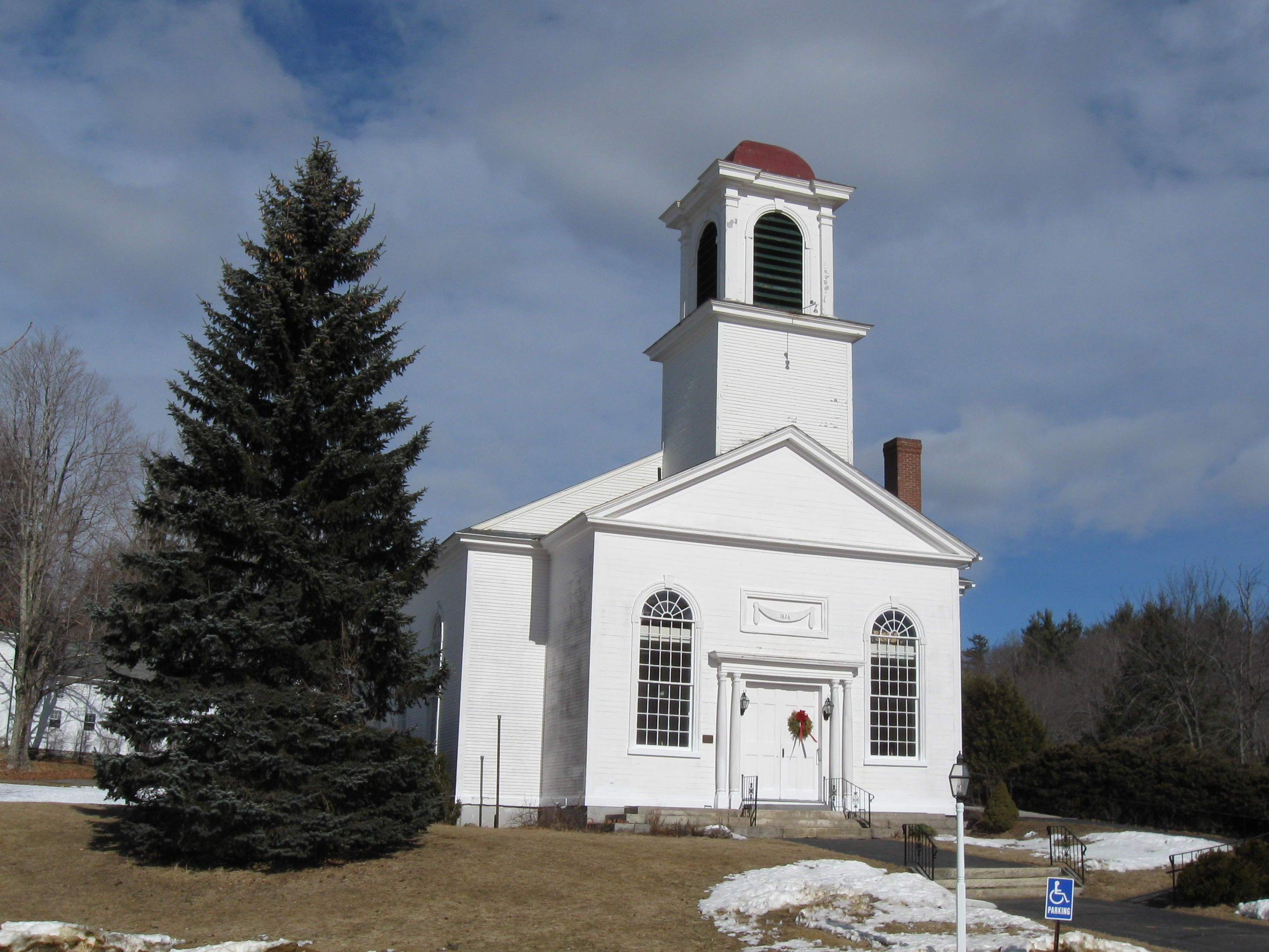

- Location within New Hampshire Location within the United States
- Location: Province Rd., Gilmanton, New Hampshire
- Coordinates: 43°25′31″N 71°24′51″W
- Area: 1 acre (0.40 ha)
- Built: 1826
- Architectural style: Federal
- NRHP reference No.: 83001125
- Added to NRHP: September 08, 1983

The Centre Congregational Church is a historic Congregational church on Province Road (New Hampshire Route 107) in Gilmanton, New Hampshire. Built in 1826–27, it is one of the region's best examples of a late Federal-period church. It was listed on the National Register of Historic Places in 1983.

== Description and history ==
The Centre Congregational Church is located in the village center of Gilmanton, on the north side of Province Road just west of its junction with New Hampshire Route 140. It is a two-story wood-frame structure with a gable roof. Its main block is rectangular, with an unusually deep entrance pavilion topped by a full pediment and two-stage square belltower. The main entrance is a large double door flanked by paired columns, supporting an entablature and projecting cornice. It is flanked by a pair of large arched windows, and there is a recessed molded panel with a decorative swag above the doorway. The belltower's first stage is a simple square clapboarded section, and the second stage uses corner pilasters and arched louvers. The interior retains original flooring and woodwork, as well as kerosene light fixtures (although these are no longer used). Alterations include the removal of some of the original pews to make way for an organ.

The church was built in 1826-27 for a local Congregationalist congregation, created by some sort of religious division with the First Congregational Church. The building avoided the fate of similar surviving period churches, the updating of its interior during the Victorian period, because the town's population declined during that time.

== See also ==
- National Register of Historic Places listings in Belknap County, New Hampshire
