= Pleasant Lake (Deerfield, New Hampshire) =

Lake in New Hampshire, United States

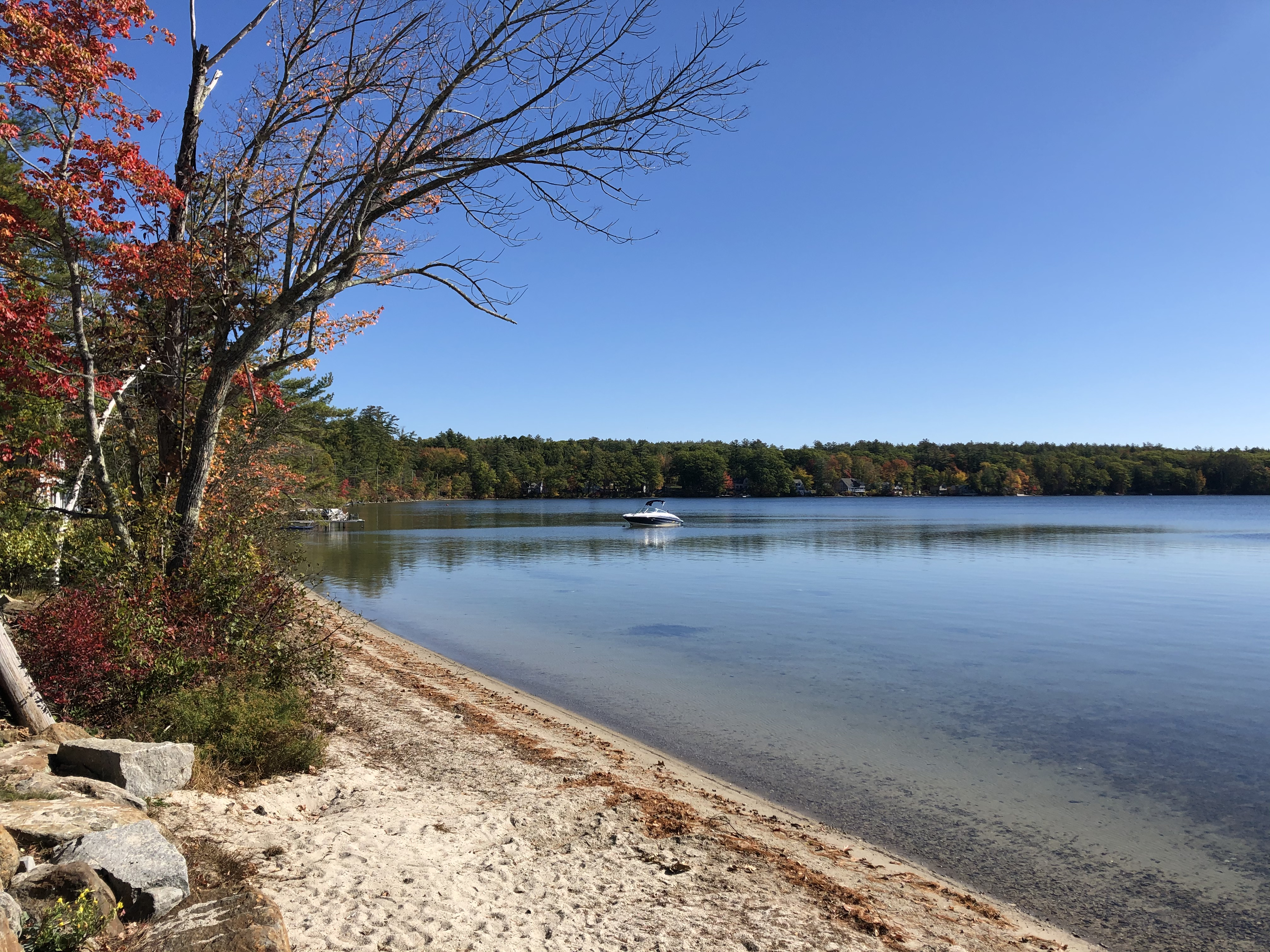
- Looking east from the lake outlet at Gulf Road

- Location within New Hampshire Location within the United States
- Location: Rockingham County, New Hampshire
- Coordinates: 43°11′25″N 71°15′45″W
- Primary outflows: tributary of Northwood Lake
- Basin countries: United States
- Max. length: 1.8 mi (2.9 km)
- Max. width: 0.7 mi (1.1 km)
- Surface area: 479 acres (1.94 km^{2})
- Average depth: 31 ft (9.4 m)
- Max. depth: 65 ft (20 m)
- Surface elevation: 578 ft (176 m)
- Settlements: Deerfield; Northwood

Pleasant Lake is a 479-acre (1.94 km^{2}) lake located in Rockingham County in central New Hampshire, United States, in the town of Deerfield. The eastern shore of the lake forms the boundary between Deerfield and the town of Northwood. Water from Pleasant Lake flows north to Northwood Lake, then west via the Little Suncook River to the Suncook River, a tributary of the Merrimack River.

The lake is classified as a cold- and warmwater fishery, with observed species including brown trout, rainbow trout, smallmouth and largemouth bass, chain pickerel, brown bullhead, and white perch.

== See also ==
- List of lakes in New Hampshire
