= New Hampshire Route 106 =

North-south state highway in New Hampshire, US

New Hampshire Route 106
- Map of central New Hampshire with NH 106 highlighted in red

Route information
- Maintained by NHDOT
- Length: 34.535 mi (55.579 km)

Major junctions
- South end: US 3 in Pembroke
- NH 9 in Concord; I-393 / US 4 / US 202 in Concord; US 3 / NH 11 in Laconia
- North end: US 3 in Meredith

Location
- Country: United States
- State: New Hampshire
- Counties: Merrimack, Belknap

Highway system
- New Hampshire Highway System; Interstate; US; State; Turnpikes
← NH 104	→ NH 107

New Hampshire Route 106 is a 34.535-mile-long (55.579 km) secondary north–south highway in Merrimack and Belknap counties in central New Hampshire. It connects the town of Pembroke with Meredith in the Lakes Region.

The first green LED traffic light in the nation was installed at the junction of NH 106 and Loudon Road on May 17, 1996.

The southern terminus of NH 106 is at U.S. Route 3 in Pembroke just south of the Concord city line. The northern terminus is also at US 3, south of Meredith.

== Route description ==
NH 106's southern terminus is at US 3 in Pembroke, from where it travels along Sheep Davis Road northeast across the Soucook River into the city of Concord. Closely following the west bank of the Soucook River through the east side of Concord, it has an intersection with NH 9 and then immediately has an interchange with I-393/US 202/US 4. Passing into the town of Loudon, it changes names to Rocky Pond Road, and has an intersection with NH 129 in the main village of Loudon. At the north end of the town, on the border with Canterbury, NH 106 passes the New Hampshire Motor Speedway, the largest sports venue in the state. In quick succession, it passes then through small parts of Canterbury, Loudon a second time, and Gilmanton, before reaching the town of Belmont.

In the town of Belmont, it is known as Laconia Road. It has an intersection with NH 140 in the main village of Belmont, then enters the city of Laconia where it changes names to Belmont Road. After an interchange with the Laconia Bypass (US 3/NH 11), it joins NH 107 in a concurrency along Main Street. In downtown Laconia, NH 107 leaves to join NH 11A, while NH 106 continues northwest along Main Street between Lake Winnisquam and Opechee Bay. The name changes to Parade Road in northern Laconia, before entering the town of Meredith. In Meredith, the route reaches its northern terminus at a traffic circle with US 3/Daniel Webster Highway about a mile south of Meredith Village.

== Speedway access ==
New Hampshire Motor Speedway is located on NH 106 in Loudon, approximately 9 miles (14 km) north of the interchange with I-393. Because the highway was not designed to handle the heavy traffic flows during the busiest NASCAR events at the speedway, traffic flow on NH 106 is shifted between I-393 and the speedway to ease congestion. Full-width breakdown lanes allow for four total lanes of travel during these events.

Leading up to the events, the road is converted so that there are three northbound travel lanes (both regular travel lanes and the northbound breakdown lane). All southbound traffic uses the southbound breakdown lane.

Immediately following the events, the road is converted to southbound-only traffic. Northbound traffic is detoured onto I-93 northbound to exit 20 and must use NH 140 from Belmont to reach NH 106.

== Major intersections ==
County	Location	mi	km	Destinations	Notes
Merrimack	Pembroke	0.000	0.000	US 3 (Pembroke Street) – Pembroke, Manchester, Concord	Southern terminus
Merrimack	Concord	4.053	6.523	NH 9 (Loudon Road) – Portsmouth, Concord Heights	
Merrimack	Concord	4.116– 4.318	6.624– 6.949	I-393 / US 4 / US 202 – Portsmouth, Concord	Exit 3 on I-393
Merrimack	Loudon	8.050	12.955	NH 129 (South Village Road) – Loudon Village, Gilmanton	
Belknap	Belmont	20.078	32.312	NH 140 (Gilmanton Road) to I-93 – Tilton, Gilmanton	
Belknap	Laconia	24.841– 25.150	39.978– 40.475	US 3 / NH 11 (Daniel Webster Highway / Laconia–Gilford Bypass) – Gilford, Meredith, Alton, Tilton, Franklin	Partial interchange; no southbound access to US 3 north/NH 11 east
Belknap	Laconia	25.474	40.996	NH 107 south (South Main Street) – Pittsfield, Gilford, Gilmanton	Southern end of concurrency with NH 107
Belknap	Laconia	26.019	41.874	NH 11A / NH 107 north (Court Street / Union Avenue) to I-93	Northern end of concurrency with NH 107; unsigned US 3 Bus.
Belknap	Meredith	34.535	55.579	US 3 (Daniel Webster Highway) – Meredith, Weirs Beach	Northern terminus
1.000 mi = 1.609 km; 1.000 km = 0.621 mi: Concurrency terminus; Incomplete access
