= Tioga River (New Hampshire) =

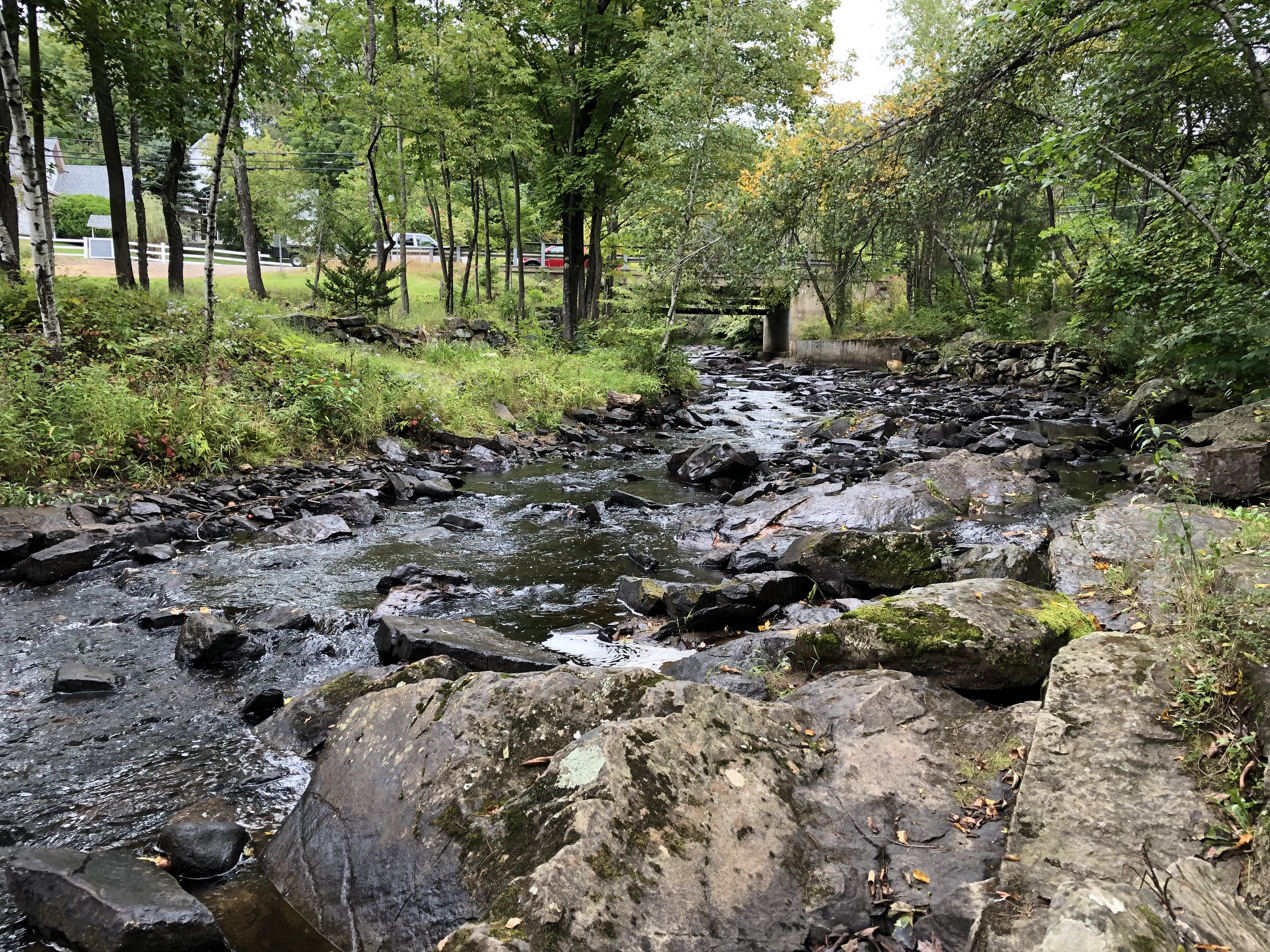
- The Tioga River in the center of Belmont, NH (2019)

- Location within New Hampshire Location within the United States

Location
- Country: United States
- State: New Hampshire
- Counties: Belknap, Merrimack
- Towns: Gilmanton, Belmont, Northfield

Physical characteristics
- Source
  - location: Gilmanton
  - coordinates: 43°28′0″N 71°24′18″W
  - elevation: 1,130 ft (340 m)
- Mouth: Winnipesaukee River
  - location: Belmont
  - coordinates: 43°27′12″N 71°32′45″W
  - elevation: 465 ft (142 m)
- Length: 12.8 mi (20.6 km)

Basin features
- Tributaries
  - left: Badger Brook, Pumping Station Branch

The Tioga River is a 12.8-mile-long (20.6 km) river located in the Lakes Region of central New Hampshire in the United States. It is a tributary of the Winnipesaukee River, part of the Merrimack River watershed.

The Tioga River rises on the western slopes of the Belknap Mountains in Gilmanton, New Hampshire. Flowing west, the river quickly enters the town of Belmont, where it spends most of its existence. The river passes through Badger Pond shortly before reaching the village proper of Belmont, which was sited along the Tioga River in the 19th century for its waterpower. The river continues west, reaching a broad wetland along the Belmont-Northfield town line, and ends at the Winnipesaukee River near the outlet of Silver Lake.

New Hampshire Route 140 follows the general course of the river from Belmont village to the Winnipesaukee.

== See also ==
- List of rivers of New Hampshire
