= Loudon (CDP), New Hampshire =

Census-designated place in New Hampshire, United States

Loudon, New Hampshire
- Census-designated place
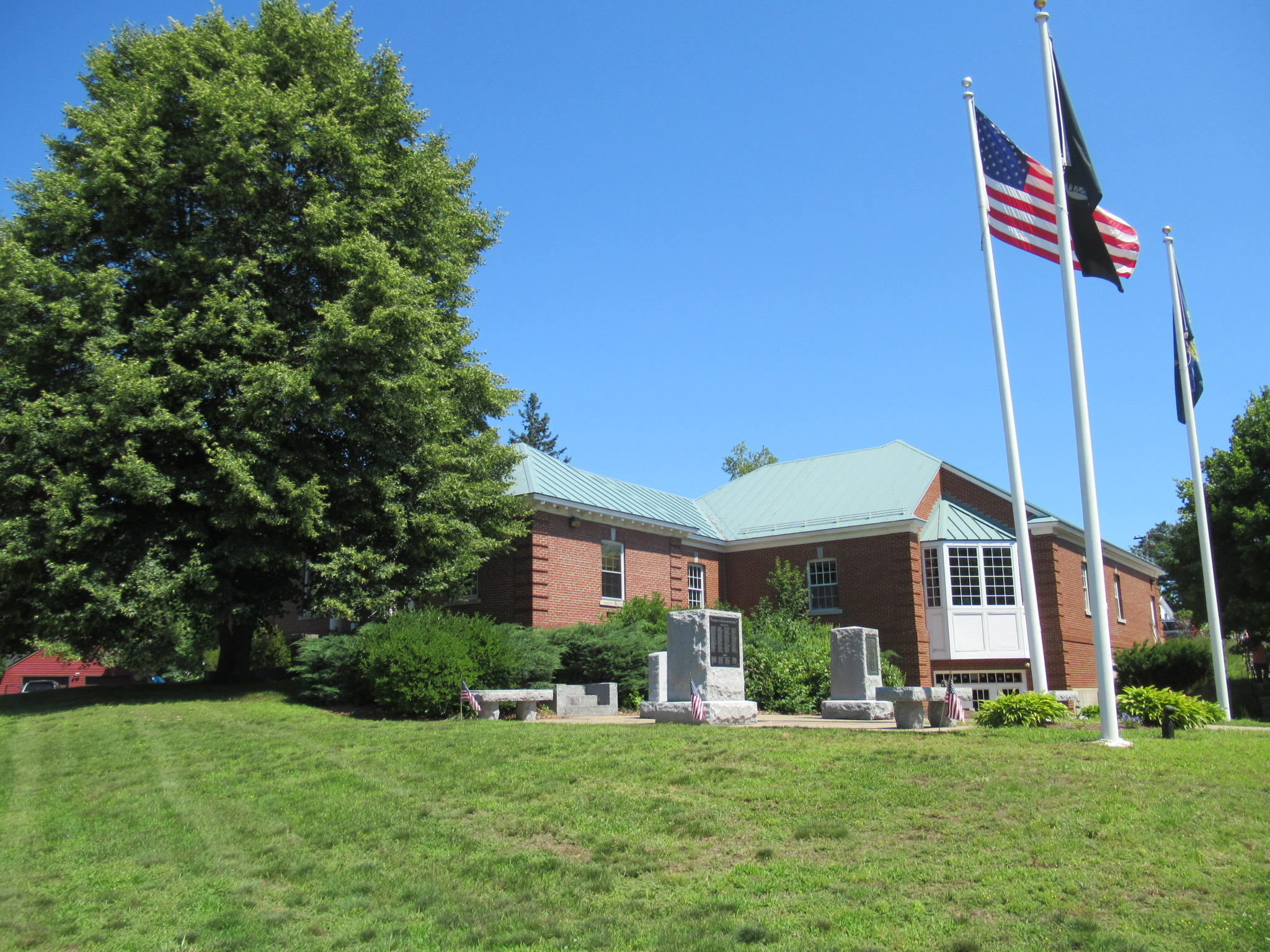
- Maxfield Public Library

- Location within New Hampshire Location within the United States
- Coordinates: 43°16′55″N 71°27′54″W
- Country: United States
- State: New Hampshire
- County: Merrimack
- Town: Loudon

Area
  - Total: 1.81 sq mi (4.68 km^{2})
  - Land: 1.81 sq mi (4.68 km^{2})
  - Water: 0 sq mi (0.00 km^{2})
- Elevation: 387 ft (118 m)

Population (2020)
  - Total: 711
  - Density: 393.3/sq mi (151.87/km^{2})
- Time zone: UTC-5 (Eastern (EST))
  - Summer (DST): UTC-4 (EDT)
- ZIP code: 03307
- Area code: 603
- FIPS code: 33-43300
- GNIS feature ID: 2629726

Loudon is a census-designated place (CDP) and the main village in the town of Loudon, New Hampshire, United States. The population of the CDP was 711 at the 2020 census, out of 5,576 in the entire town.

== Geography ==
The CDP is in the southern part of the town of Loudon, on both sides of the Soucook River. The northern boundary of the CDP is north of School Street, Church Street, and New Hampshire Route 129, and follows Wiggins Road to the northeastern corner of the CDP. To the east, all houses on East Cooper Street, Hemlock Hill Drive, Ilona Lane, and Brown Lane are within the CDP. The border extends south along New Hampshire Route 106 to Wales Bridge over the Soucook River, then turns northwest up Riverview Lane and Pine Island Brook until back to the northwest corner of the CDP.

Route 106 passes through the eastern side of the CDP, leading north 18 miles (29 km) to Laconia and south 8 miles (13 km) to U.S. Route 3 in Pembroke. Concord, the state capital, is eight miles to the southwest via Route 106 and Interstate 393. Route 129 leads northeast from Loudon 9 miles (14 km) to New Hampshire Route 107 in the southern part of Gilmanton.

According to the U.S. Census Bureau, the Loudon CDP has a total area of 1.8 square miles (4.7 km^{2}), all of it recorded as land. The Soucook River, which flows southward through the center of the community, is part of the Merrimack River watershed.

== Demographics ==
Historical population
Census	Pop.	Note	%±
2010	559		—
2020	711		27.2%
U.S. Decennial Census

As of the census of 2010, there were 559 people, 233 households, and 147 families residing in the CDP. There were 256 housing units, of which 23, or 9.0%, were vacant. The racial makeup of the CDP was 97.5% white, 0.2% African American, 0.2% Native American, 0.5% Asian, 0.0% Pacific Islander, 0.2% some other race, and 1.4% from two or more races. 0.9% of the population were Hispanic or Latino of any race.

Of the 233 households in the CDP, 27.0% had children under the age of 18 living with them, 54.9% were headed by married couples living together, 5.2% had a female householder with no husband present, and 36.9% were non-families. 31.3% of all households were made up of individuals, and 20.2% were someone living alone who was 65 years of age or older. The average household size was 2.40, and the average family size was 2.96.

20.9% of residents in the CDP were under the age of 18, 6.0% were from age 18 to 24, 21.3% were from 25 to 44, 30.9% were from 45 to 64, and 20.9% were 65 years of age or older. The median age was 46.1 years. For every 100 females, there were 91.4 males. For every 100 females age 18 and over, there were 85.7 males.

For the period 2011–15, the estimated median annual income for a household was $64,625, and the median income for a family was $65,313. The per capita income for the CDP was $33,566.
