= NH 129 =

NH 129 may refer to:

- National Highway 129 (India)
- New Hampshire Route 129, United States
