= Loudon Town Hall =

Historic church in New Hampshire, United States

- U.S. National Register of Historic Places
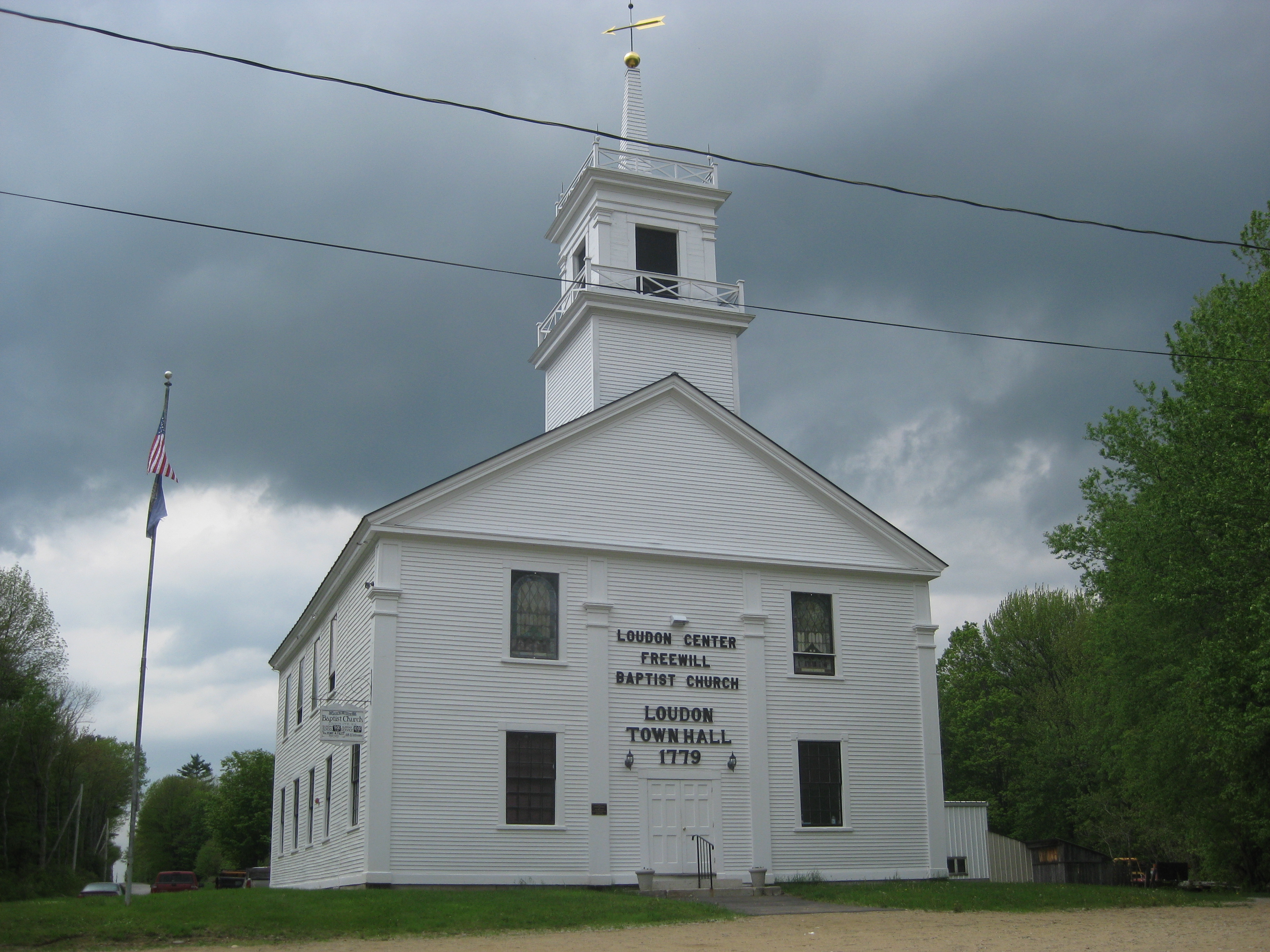

- Location within New Hampshire Location within the United States
- Location: 433 Clough Hill Rd., Loudon, New Hampshire
- Coordinates: 43°19′57″N 71°25′51″W
- Area: 1 acre (0.40 ha)
- Built: 1779
- Architectural style: Greek Revival
- NRHP reference No.: 90001351
- Added to NRHP: September 05, 1990

Loudon Town Hall is a historic New England meetinghouse at 433 Clough Hill Road in Loudon, New Hampshire. Built in 1779 and extensively restyled in 1847, this Greek Revival structure was used for many years for both religious and civic purposes; it now serves principally as a church, housing a Free Will Baptist congregation. The building was listed on the National Register of Historic Places in 1990; it is one of the oldest civic buildings in Merrimack County.

== Description and history ==
The former Loudon Town Hall is located in a rural setting near the geographic center of Loudon, at the northwest corner of Clough Hill and Youngs Hill roads. It is a 2½-story rectangular wood-frame structure, with a gabled roof and clapboarded exterior. The building corners are articulated by broad pilasters, which also separate the three bays of the front façade. The front has a fully pedimented gable, with a central tympanum void of decoration. Above it rises a two-stage tower. The first stage of the tower is a plain square, topped by a railing. The slightly smaller second stage houses the belfry, with louvered openings and corner pilasters. It is also topped by a railing, with a slender steeple capping the structure.

The town of Loudon was incorporated in 1773 out of Canterbury, its residents complaining that it was difficult or impossible to attend religious services or town affairs in Canterbury. By September 1779 the new town had finally decided on a location, appropriated funds, and built the shell of this building sufficient to hold a town meeting there. The building was not substantially completed until 1794. In 1847, the town reached an agreement with the local Free Will Baptist congregation to fund alterations and modernizations of the building, in exchange for the congregation's use of the upper hall. It is at this time that the building received its Greek Revival styling, and the basics of its present interior were laid out.

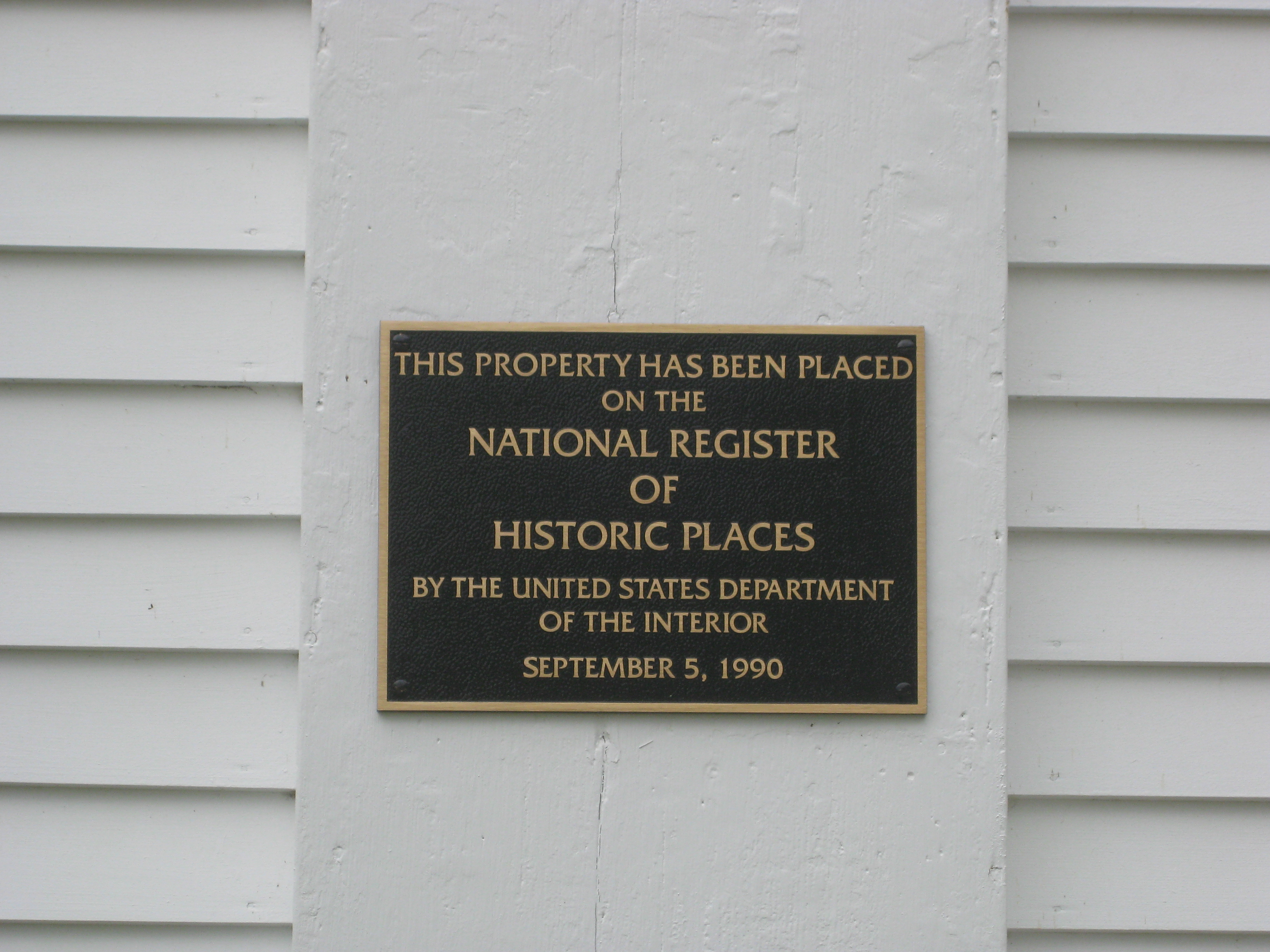
The Loudon Town Hall is listed on the National Register of Historic Places.

Town offices were moved out of the building in the 1970s, first to an adjacent public works building which no longer stands. The present-day town hall for Loudon is located at 29 South Village Road in the center of Loudon village, and this building now serves exclusively as the home of the Freewill Baptist Church congregation. It has undergone only modest modifications since about 1922.

== See also ==
- National Register of Historic Places listings in Merrimack County, New Hampshire
