= Senator Prescott =

Senator Prescott may refer to:

- Russell Prescott (fl. 2010s), New Hampshire State Senate
- Stedman Prescott (1896–1968), Maryland State Senate
- William Prescott (physician) (1788–1875), Connecticut State Senate
- William Prescott Jr. (1762–1844), Massachusetts State Senate
