= Tioga River =

Tioga River may refer to any of several rivers in the United States:

- Tioga River (Michigan), a tributary of the Sturgeon River
- Tioga River (New Hampshire), a tributary of the Winnipesaukee River
- Tioga River (Chemung River), a tributary of the Chemung River in New York and Pennsylvania
