= Belmont (CDP), New Hampshire =

Census-designated place in New Hampshire, United States

Belmont, New Hampshire
- Census-designated place
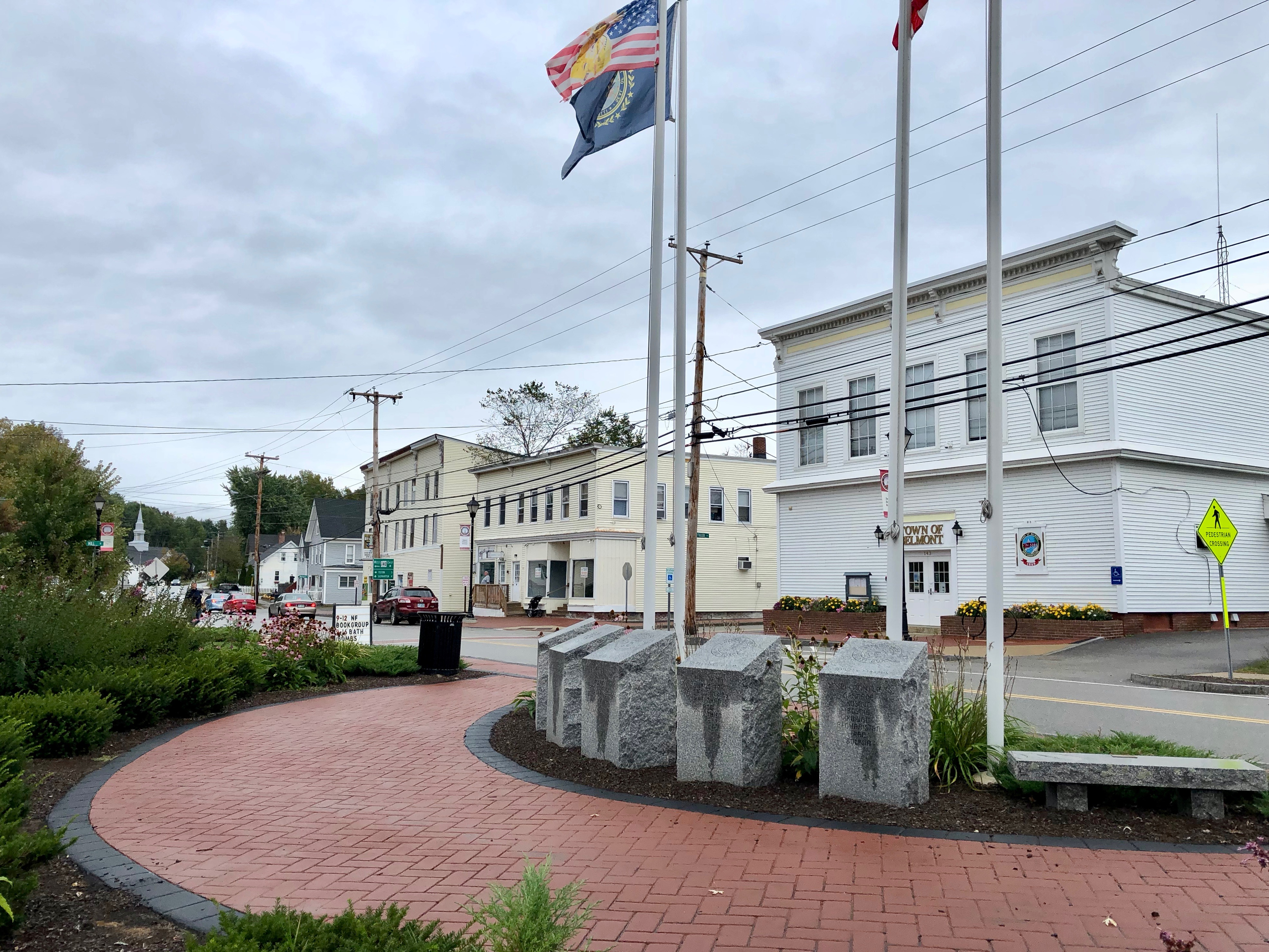
- Main Street in Belmont

- Location within New Hampshire Location within the United States
- Coordinates: 43°26′35″N 71°28′41″W
- Country: United States
- State: New Hampshire
- County: Belknap
- Town: Belmont

Area
  - Total: 1.27 sq mi (3.30 km^{2})
  - Land: 1.26 sq mi (3.26 km^{2})
  - Water: 0.015 sq mi (0.04 km^{2})
- Elevation: 568 ft (173 m)

Population (2020)
  - Total: 1,285
  - Density: 1,021.6/sq mi (394.45/km^{2})
- Time zone: UTC-5 (Eastern (EST))
  - Summer (DST): UTC-4 (EDT)
- ZIP code: 03220
- Area code: 603
- FIPS code: 33-04660
- GNIS feature ID: 2629713

Belmont is a census-designated place (CDP) and the main village in the town of Belmont, New Hampshire, United States. The population was 1,285 at the 2020 census, out of 7,314 in the entire town of Belmont.

== Geography ==
The CDP is in the southern part of the town, along a portion of the Tioga River that drops about 40 feet (12 m) in 0.4 miles (0.64 km). The CDP extends southwest to Pumping Station Brook, south as far as Wareing Road and Higgins Drive, east to include Belmont Elementary School and the housing development around Sleepy Hollow Lane, north to Perkins Road, River Street, Seavey Road, and Hurricane Road, and northwest to an unnamed brook that joins the Tioga River just west of Pumping Station Brook.

New Hampshire Routes 106 and 140 intersect in the CDP just east of the village center. Route 106 leads north 6 miles (10 km) to Laconia and south 16 miles (26 km) to Interstate 393 in the eastern part of Concord, while Route 140 leads east 16 miles (26 km) to Alton and west 5 miles (8 km) to U.S. Route 3 in Tilton.

According to the United States Census Bureau, the Belmont CDP has a total area of 1.3 square miles (3.3 km^{2}), of which 0.02 square miles (0.04 km^{2}), or 1.15%, are water.

== Demographics ==
Historical population
Census	Pop.	Note	%±
2010	1,301		—
2020	1,285		−1.2%
U.S. Decennial Census

As of the census of 2010, there were 1,301 people, 515 households, and 356 families residing in the CDP. There were 570 housing units, of which 55, or 9.6%, were vacant. The racial makeup of the CDP was 96.1% white, 0.6% African American, 0.1% Native American, 0.5% Asian, 0.0% Pacific Islander, 0.2% some other race, and 2.5% from two or more races. 1.5% of the population were Hispanic or Latino of any race.

Of the 515 households in the CDP, 39.2% had children under the age of 18 living with them, 42.9% were headed by married couples living together, 16.1% had a female householder with no husband present, and 30.9% were non-families. 26.2% of all households were made up of individuals, and 10.1% were someone living alone who was 65 years of age or older. The average household size was 2.53, and the average family size was 2.90.

26.7% of residents in the CDP were under the age of 18, 7.9% were from age 18 to 24, 25.2% were from 25 to 44, 26.6% were from 45 to 64, and 13.6% were 65 years of age or older. The median age was 36.1 years. For every 100 females, there were 94.5 males. For every 100 females age 18 and over, there were 91.0 males.

For the period 2011–15, the estimated median annual income for a household was $60,625, and the median income for a family was $66,328. The per capita income for the CDP was $21,038.
