= Smith Meeting House =

Historic church in New Hampshire, United States

- U.S. National Register of Historic Places
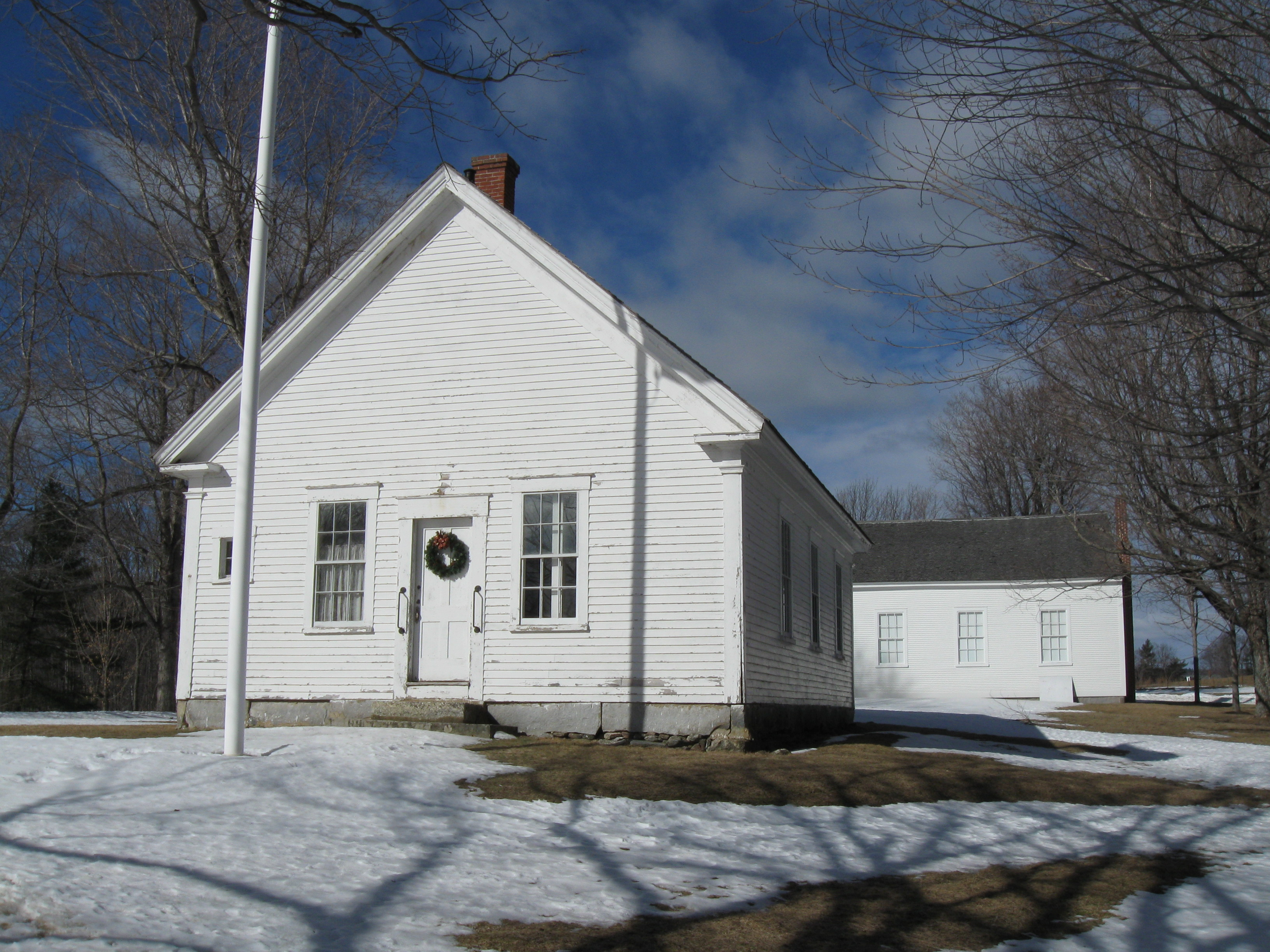

- Location within New Hampshire Location within the United States
- Location: Jct. of Meeting House and Governor Rds., Gilmanton, New Hampshire
- Coordinates: 43°24′57″N 71°21′48″W
- Area: less than one acre
- Built: c. 1840
- Architectural style: Greek Revival
- NRHP reference No.: 98000196
- Added to NRHP: March 23, 1998

The Smith Meeting House is a historic church at the junction of Meeting House and Governor Roads in Gilmanton, New Hampshire. Built about 1840, it is a well-preserved example of a vernacular 19th-century church building. The building was listed on the National Register of Historic Places in 1998.

== Description and history ==
The Smith Meeting House is located in a rural setting near the geographic center of Gilmanton, just south of the junction of Meeting House and Governor Roads. It is a 1 1/2-story wood-frame structure, with a gabled roof, clapboarded exterior, and granite foundation. Its main facade has a pair of symmetrically placed entrances, with three windows above. The central window is a stained glass window with a floral motif including a cross and crown. The interior has two small vestibules at the rear, one of which includes a narrow stair up to a choir gallery. The main chamber is relatively unadorned, with pine floors and wainscoting, and is illuminated by electric fixtures, although original kerosene sconces and chandeliers are still present.

The church was built about 1840, and was named for Gilmanton's first minister, Isaac Smith. He preached at the town's first meeting house, which was also located on this site. The present structure is said to contain structural members used in the construction of the original building. Rarely used for civic functions, its religious use declined in the late 19th century, and its maintenance was taken over in 1898 by the Old Smith Meeting House Improvement Society.

== See also ==
- National Register of Historic Places listings in Belknap County, New Hampshire
