= Epsom, New Hampshire =

- Town
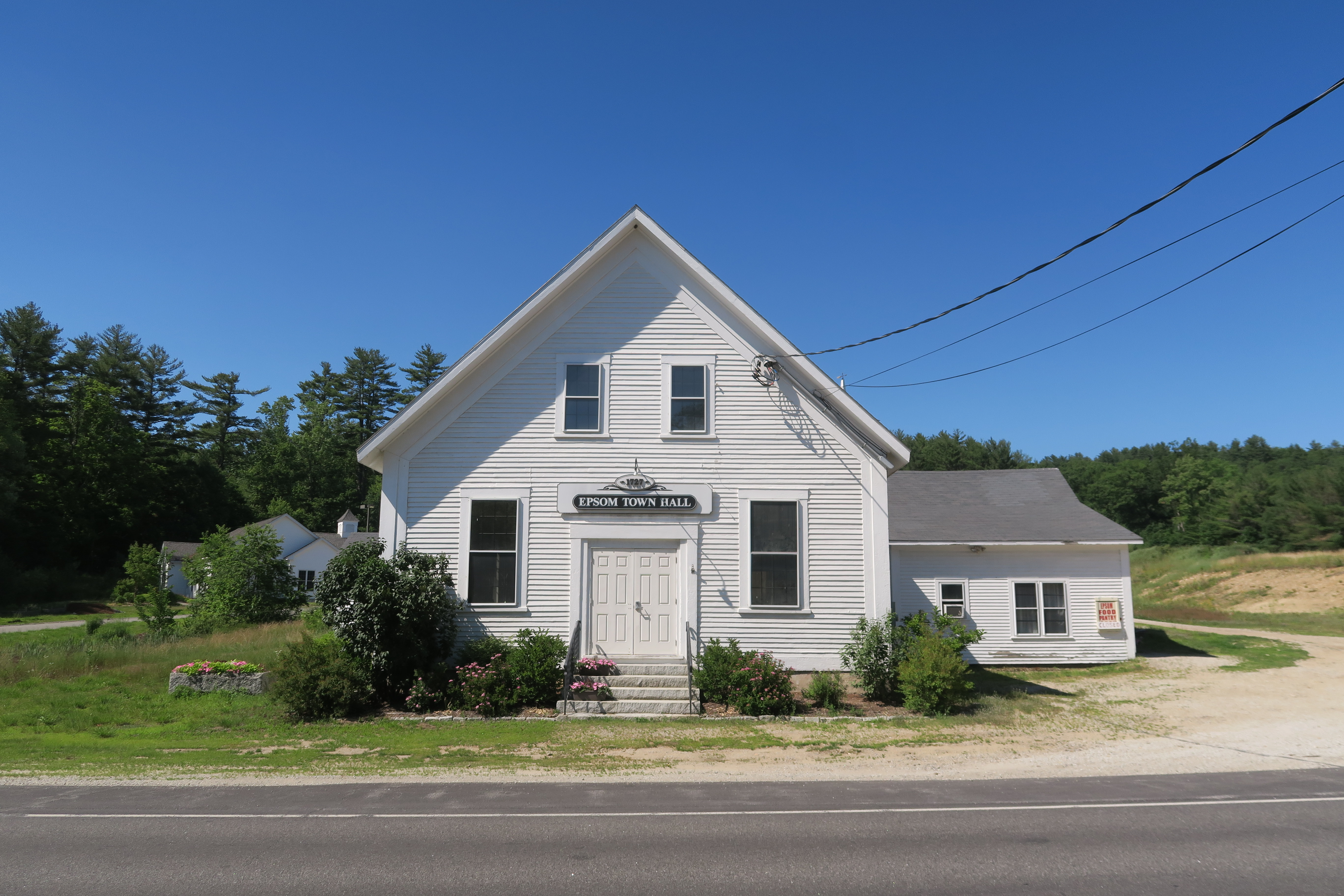
- Epsom Town Hall, listed on the New Hampshire State Register of Historic Places

- Seal

- Location in Merrimack County and the state of New Hampshire
- Coordinates: 43°13′22″N 71°19′55″W
- Country: United States
- State: New Hampshire
- County: Merrimack
- Incorporated: 1727
- Villages: Epsom; Gossville; Short Falls

Area
  - Total: 34.61 sq mi (89.65 km^{2})
  - Land: 34.42 sq mi (89.14 km^{2})
  - Water: 0.20 sq mi (0.51 km^{2}) 0.57%
- Elevation: 735 ft (224 m)

Population (2020)
  - Total: 4,834
  - Density: 140/sq mi (54.2/km^{2})
- Time zone: UTC-5 (Eastern)
  - Summer (DST): UTC-4 (Eastern)
- ZIP code: 03234
- Area code: 603
- FIPS code: 33-24900
- GNIS feature ID: 873592
- Website: www.epsomnh.gov

Epsom is a town in Merrimack County, New Hampshire, United States. The population was 4,834 at the 2020 census.

== History ==
Incorporated in 1727, Epsom takes its name from Epsom in Surrey, England. Although dotted with several small mountains, the land was suitable for grazing and growing grain. By 1859, when the town's population was 1,366, it had two gristmills and two sawmills.

On April 24, 1944, a Consolidated B-24 Liberator (s/n 42-5111) crashed into a mountain in Epsom, killing all 10 occupants.

== Geography ==
Epsom is in central New Hampshire, in the eastern part of Merrimack County. The eastern border of the town is the Rockingham County line. Concord, the state capital, is 11 miles (18 km) to the west by U.S. Route 4, while the same highway leads east 34 miles (55 km) to Portsmouth on New Hampshire's seacoast.

According to the U.S. Census Bureau, the town of Epsom has a total area of 34.6 square miles (89.7 km^{2}), of which 34.4 square miles (89.1 km^{2}) are land and 0.2 square miles (0.5 km^{2}) are water, comprising 0.57% of the town. The town is drained by the Suncook River and its tributary, the Little Suncook River. Epsom lies fully within the Merrimack River watershed. The highest point in Epsom is the summit of Fort Mountain, at 1,413 feet (431 m) above sea level, in the eastern part of town. Other small summits in town include McCoy Mountain (1,270 ft or 390 m) and Nats Mountain (1,180 ft or 360 m).

=== Adjacent municipalities ===
- Pittsfield (north)
- Northwood (northeast)
- Deerfield (east)
- Allenstown (south)
- Pembroke (southwest)
- Chichester (west)

== Demographics ==
Historical population
Census	Pop.	Note	%±
1790	799		—
1800	1,034		29.4%
1810	1,156		11.8%
1820	1,336		15.6%
1830	1,408		5.4%
1840	1,205		−14.4%
1850	1,366		13.4%
1860	1,216		−11.0%
1870	993		−18.3%
1880	909		−8.5%
1890	815		−10.3%
1900	771		−5.4%
1910	725		−6.0%
1920	655		−9.7%
1930	678		3.5%
1940	797		17.6%
1950	756		−5.1%
1960	1,002		32.5%
1970	1,469		46.6%
1980	2,743		86.7%
1990	3,591		30.9%
2000	4,021		12.0%
2010	4,566		13.6%
2020	4,834		5.9%
U.S. Decennial Census

As of the census of 2000, there were 4,021 people, 1,491 households, and 1,103 families residing in the town. The population density was 117.7 inhabitants per square mile (45.4/km^{2}). There were 1,592 housing units at an average density of 46.6 per square mile (18.0/km^{2}). The racial makeup of the town was 98.63% White, 0.10% African American, 0.10% Native American, 0.32% Asian, 0.10% from other races, and 0.75% from two or more races. Hispanic or Latino of any race were 0.45% of the population.

There were 1,491 households, out of which 34.2% had children under the age of 18 living with them, 64.0% were married couples living together, 6.9% had a female householder with no husband present, and 26.0% were non-families. 19.7% of all households were made up of individuals, and 7.4% had someone living alone who was 65 years of age or older. The average household size was 2.62 and the average family size was 3.01.

In the town, the population was spread out, with 24.5% under the age of 18, 5.3% from 18 to 24, 30.9% from 25 to 44, 25.4% from 45 to 64, and 14.0% who were 65 years of age or older. The median age was 39 years. For every 100 females, there were 92.1 males. For every 100 females age 18 and over, there were 89.8 males.

The median income for a household in the town was $50,685, and the median income for a family was $56,875. Males had a median income of $40,995 versus $27,106 for females. The per capita income for the town was $22,026. About 1.9% of families and 3.1% of the population were below the poverty line, including 3.4% of those under age 18 and 3.2% of those age 65 or over.

== Transportation ==
Three New Hampshire state routes and two U.S. routes cross Epsom.

- NH 9, U.S. Route 4, and U.S. Route 202 run concurrently through town, connecting Chichester in the west to Northwood in the east. It is known locally as Dover Road.
- NH 28 crosses the western side of town, roughly paralleling the Suncook River, connecting Pembroke to Chichester along Suncook Valley Road.
- NH 107 enters from Deerfield at the eastern edge of town in the vicinity of Northwood Lake, and joins NH 9, US 4, and US 202 to form a four-way concurrency before entering Northwood. It follows North Road before joining the other routes.

== Notable people ==
- John Dolbeer (1827–1902), inventor, entrepreneur
- Noah Martin (1801–1863), doctor; 30th governor of New Hampshire
- Andrew McClary (1730–1775), highest-ranking officer to fall in the Battle of Bunker Hill
- John B. Sanborn (1826–1904), Civil War-era brigadier general; state representative in Minnesota
- Walter Henry Sanborn (1845–1928), U.S. federal judge
