= Soucook River =

River in the United States of America

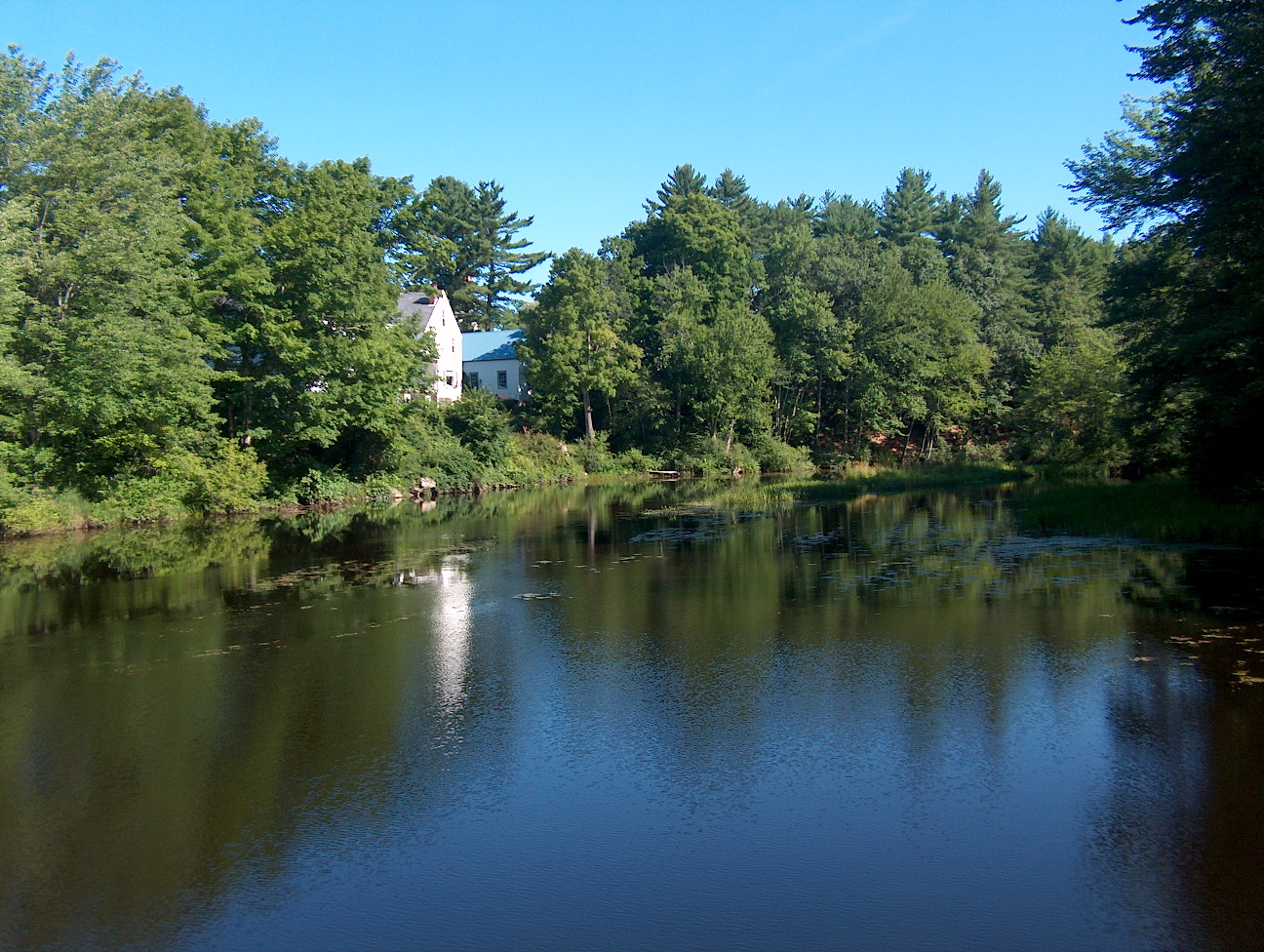
- The Soucook River in Loudon, NH

- Location within New Hampshire Location within the United States

Location
- Country: United States
- State: New Hampshire
- County: Merrimack
- Towns and city: Canterbury, Loudon, Concord, Pembroke

Physical characteristics
- Source: Rocky Pond
  - location: Canterbury, Loudon
  - coordinates: 43°23′44″N 71°27′18″W
  - elevation: 530 ft (160 m)
- Mouth: Merrimack River
  - location: Concord, Pembroke
  - coordinates: 43°9′32″N 71°29′39″W
  - elevation: 195 ft (59 m)
- Length: 29.2 mi (47.0 km)

Basin features
- Tributaries
  - left: Academy Brook, Bumfagon Brook, Clark Brook, Bee Hole Brook
  - right: Gues Meadow Brook, Shaker Brook, Pine Island Brook

The Soucook River is a 29.2-mile-long (47.0 km) river located in central New Hampshire in the United States. It is a tributary of the Merrimack River, which flows to the Gulf of Maine.

The Soucook River begins at the outlet of Rocky Pond on the border between the towns of Canterbury and Loudon, New Hampshire. The river flows south through gently rolling terrain, soon entering Loudon and passing near the New Hampshire Motor Speedway. The river passes through the village proper of Loudon, crossing a small dam, and continues south along a more suburban corridor on the outskirts of Concord. The river forms the boundary between Concord and Pembroke and ends at the Merrimack River downstream from Garvins Falls.

There are extensive sand and gravel deposits filling the Soucook River valley, which has led to the creation of several large excavation operations close to the river. New Hampshire Route 106 parallels the river throughout its course, crossing the river four times.

== See also ==
- List of rivers of New Hampshire
