= William Prescott (physician) =

American politician

William Prescot (29 December 1788 – 18 October 1875) was an American medical doctor, politician, and naturalist.

== Biography ==
William Prescot was born in Gilmanton, New Hampshire, December 29, 1788. He was indentured to a farmer at sixteen years of age, received few educational advantages, taught, studied medicine, and in 1815 graduated at Dartmouth Medical School. He practised in Gilmanton and Lynn, and served in both branches of the Connecticut State Legislature. Dr. Prescott was an enthusiastic collector of minerals and shells, and was a member of many literary and scientific societies. He died in New Haven, Connecticut, on October 18, 1875.

== Works ==
He wrote the Prescott Memorial (Boston, 1870).
