= Meredith (CDP), New Hampshire =

Census-designated place in New Hampshire, United States

Meredith, New Hampshire
- Census-designated place
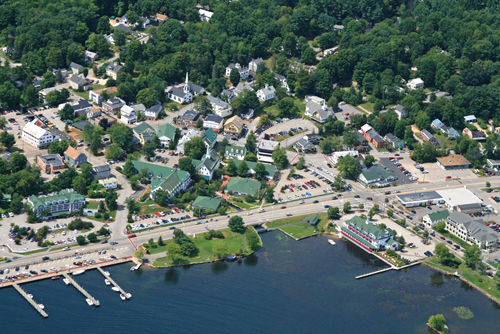
- Meredith, New Hampshire

- Location within New Hampshire Location within the United States
- Coordinates: 43°39′13″N 71°30′08″W
- Country: United States
- State: New Hampshire
- County: Belknap
- Town: Meredith

Area
  - Total: 4.22 sq mi (10.92 km^{2})
  - Land: 2.92 sq mi (7.55 km^{2})
  - Water: 1.30 sq mi (3.37 km^{2})
- Elevation: 522 ft (159 m)

Population (2020)
  - Total: 2,527
  - Density: 866.6/sq mi (334.59/km^{2})
- Time zone: UTC-5 (Eastern (EST))
  - Summer (DST): UTC-4 (EDT)
- ZIP code: 03253
- Area code: 603
- FIPS code: 33-47060
- GNIS feature ID: 2378081

Meredith is a census-designated place (CDP) and the main village in the town of Meredith, New Hampshire, United States. The population was 2,527 at the 2020 census, out of 6,662 in the entire town of Meredith.

== Geography ==
The CDP is slightly northeast of the geographic center of the town, situated between Lake Waukewan to the west and Meredith Bay on Lake Winnipesaukee to the east. The CDP extends north to Philbrook Avenue and the southern edge of the Meredith Village Cemetery, and northeast to Keyser Road. The CDP border then turns southwest down New Hampshire Route 25 to Barnard Ridge Road/Meredith Neck Road to an unnamed brook leading south into Meredith Bay. The CDP border extends further south along the bay to an unnamed brook north of Neal Shore Road, heading west to Westbury Road and then U.S. Route 3, which it then follows north to Reservoir Road. The CDP border follows Reservoir Road, Hemlock Drive, NH Route 104, Birch Hill Road, and Waukewan Street to Lake Waukewan.

U.S. Route 3 and New Hampshire Route 25 intersect on the eastern side of the CDP at the northern end of Meredith Bay. US 3 and NH 25 together lead north 8 miles (13 km) to Holderness at the outlet of Squam Lake. US 3 leads south 5 miles (8 km) to Weirs Beach and 11 miles (18 km) to the center of Laconia, while NH 25 leads northeast 5 miles (8 km) to Center Harbor and 9 miles (14 km) to Moultonborough. New Hampshire Route 104 leaves US 3 in the southern part of the CDP, leading west 8 miles (13 km) to Interstate 93 in New Hampton. New Hampshire Route 106 leaves US 3 just south of the CDP border, providing a direct route to the center of Laconia, 10 miles (16 km) south of Meredith.

According to the United States Census Bureau, the Meredith CDP has a total area of 4.2 square miles (10.9 km^{2}), of which 2.9 square miles (7.6 km^{2}) are land and 1.3 square miles (3.4 km^{2}), or 30.83%, are water.

== Demographics ==
Historical population
Census	Pop.	Note	%±
1970	1,017		—
1980	1,202		18.2%
1990	1,654		37.6%
2000	1,739		5.1%
2010	1,718		−1.2%
2020	2,527		47.1%
U.S. Decennial Census

As of the census of 2010, there were 1,718 people, 740 households, and 434 families residing in the CDP. There were 943 housing units, of which 203 were vacant. 108 of the vacant units were for seasonal use. The racial makeup of the town was 97.1% White, 0.3% African American, 0.1% Native American, 1.0% Asian, 0.1% some other race, and 1.3% from two or more races. 1.3% of the population were Hispanic or Latino of any race.

Of the 740 households, 26.2% had children under the age of 18 living with them, 39.5% were headed by married couples living together, 15.5% had a female householder with no husband present, and 41.4% were non-families. 33.5% of all households were made up of individuals, and 14.7% were someone living alone who was 65 years of age or older. The average household size was 2.19 and the average family size was 2.77.

In the CDP, 19.3% of the population were under the age of 18, 7.6% were from 18 to 24, 22.3% from 25 to 44, 27.7% from 45 to 64, and 23.0% were 65 years of age or older. The median age was 45.6 years. For every 100 females, there were 84.1 males. For every 100 females age 18 and over, there were 80.7 males.

For the period 2011–2015, the estimated median annual income for a household was $42,880, and the median income for a family was $70,278. The per capita income for the town was $22,694. 31.8% of the population and 28.7% of families were below the poverty line. 50.4% of the population under the age of 18 and 12.2% of those 65 or older were living in poverty.
