= Little Suncook River =

River in New Hampshire, United States

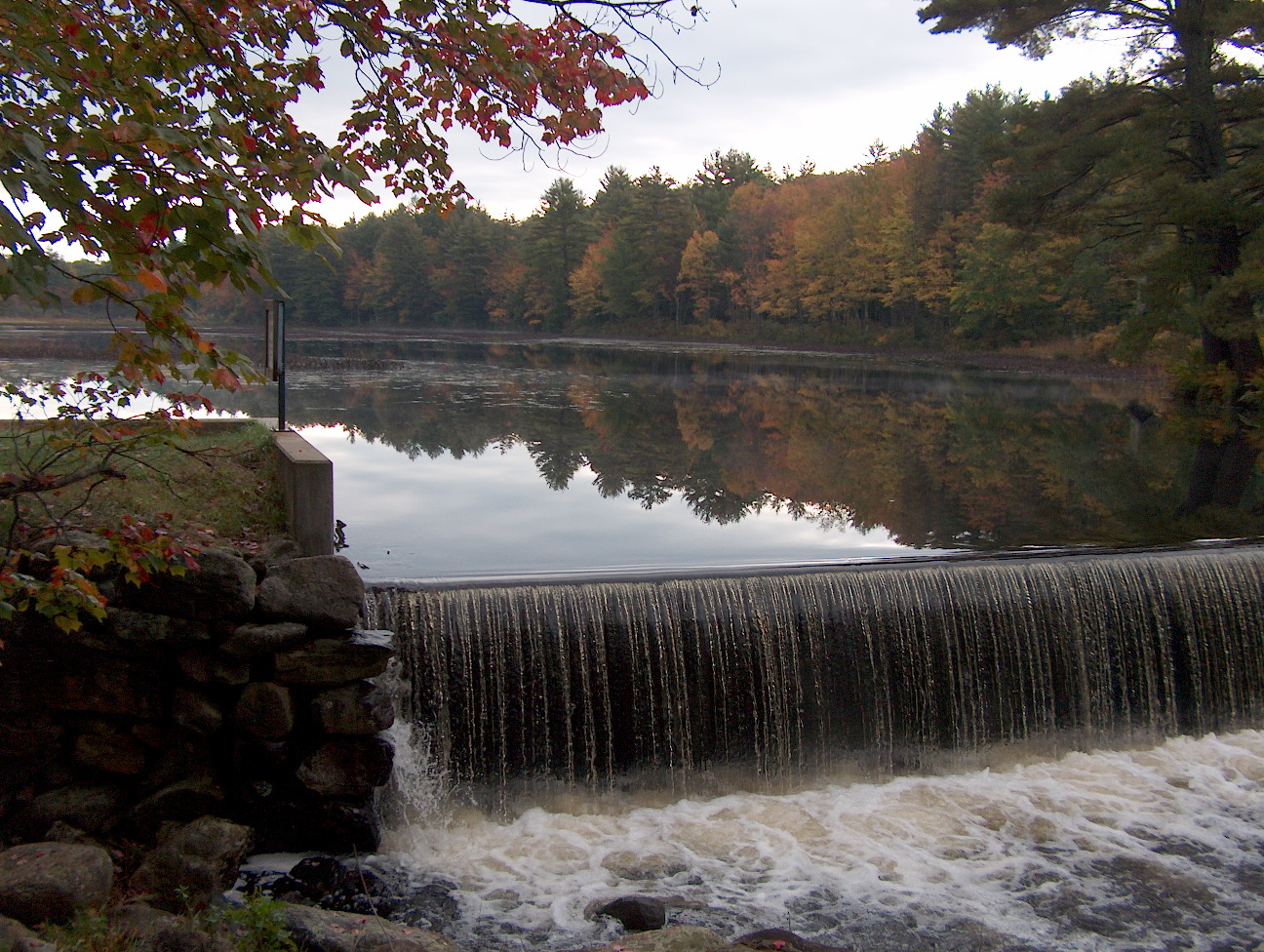
- Cass Pond on the Little Suncook in Epsom, New Hampshire

- Location within New Hampshire Location within the United States

Location
- Country: United States
- State: New Hampshire
- County: Merrimack
- Town: Epsom

Physical characteristics
- Source: Northwood Lake
  - location: Epsom
  - coordinates: 43°13′11″N 71°17′26″W
  - elevation: 517 ft (158 m)
- Mouth: Suncook River
  - location: Epsom
  - coordinates: 43°13′25″N 71°21′19″W
  - elevation: 325 ft (99 m)
- Length: 4.0 mi (6.4 km)

Basin features
- Tributaries
  - left: Little Bear Brook, Blake Brook
  - right: Gulf Brook, Lockes Brook

The Little Suncook River is a 4.0-mile-long (6.4 km) river in central New Hampshire in the United States. It is a tributary of the Suncook River, part of the Merrimack River (and therefore Gulf of Maine) watershed.

The Little Suncook begins at the outlet of Northwood Lake in the town of Epsom. Flowing west, it passes through Bixby Pond (also known as Cass Pond), passes the villages of Epsom and Gossville, and joins the Suncook River near the Epsom Traffic Circle.

U.S. Route 4 parallels the Little Suncook for the river's entire length.

== See also ==
- List of rivers of New Hampshire
