= Gilmanton, New Hampshire =

- Town
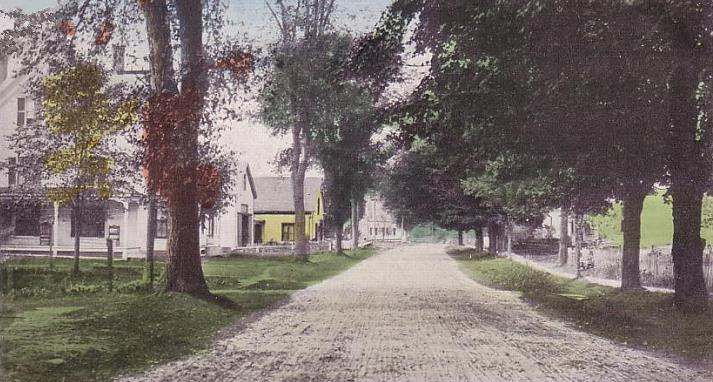
- High Street in 1910

- Seal

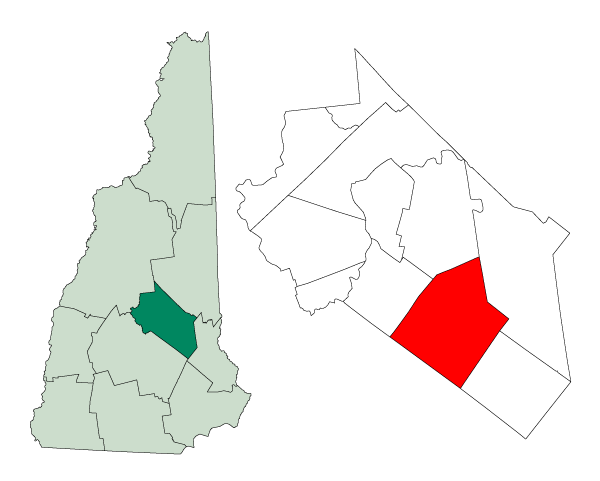
- Location in Belknap County, New Hampshire
- Coordinates: 43°25′40″N 71°22′29″W
- Country: United States
- State: New Hampshire
- County: Belknap
- Incorporated: 1727
- Villages: Gilmanton Corners; Gilmanton Ironworks; Lower Gilmanton

Area
  - Total: 59.6 sq mi (154.4 km^{2})
  - Land: 57.9 sq mi (150.0 km^{2})
  - Water: 1.7 sq mi (4.4 km^{2}) 2.87%
- Elevation: 807 ft (246 m)

Population (2020)
  - Total: 3,945
  - Density: 68/sq mi (26.3/km^{2})
- Time zone: UTC-5 (Eastern)
  - Summer (DST): UTC-4 (Eastern)
- ZIP codes: 03237 (Gilmanton); 03837 (Gilmanton Iron Works)
- Area code: 603
- FIPS code: 33-28980
- GNIS feature ID: 873604
- Website: www.gilmantonnh.gov

Gilmanton is a town in Belknap County, New Hampshire, United States. The population was 3,945 at the 2020 census, and an estimated 4,060 in 2025. Gilmanton includes the villages of Gilmanton Corners and Gilmanton Ironworks. The town became well known in the 1950s after it was rumored that the popular novel Peyton Place, written by resident Grace Metalious, was based on the town.

== History ==
Gilmanton was incorporated in 1727. First known as "Gilmantown", the town was home to the Gilman family, originally settled at Exeter. Twenty-four members of the Gilman family received land grants in the new town of Gilmanton. (Other families related to the Gilmans also received grants in the new town, including the Dudleys, the Leavitts, the Folsoms and the Coffins.) At one time it was the second-largest town in the state, following Portsmouth. The original town was larger than it is now, with villages and parishes including Belmont, Gunstock Parish (Gilford), Hurricane, Tioga, Factory Village and Lakeport. A parish first called "Averytown", the site of an unprofitable iron-mining enterprise, is still known as Gilmanton Iron Works.

Gilmanton Academy was incorporated in 1794 as "...one of the three academies first founded in the state...". In 1808 the original building burned; the second building also burned, in 1894, and was replaced with the current building, which now houses the town offices.

Gilmanton Theological Seminary was provided for by the terms of the original charter of Gilmanton Academy. Rev. Heman Rood, from New Milford, Connecticut, was the first professor in 1835. By 1841 a large, three-story brick building designed by Ammi B. Young was completed for the seminary's use.

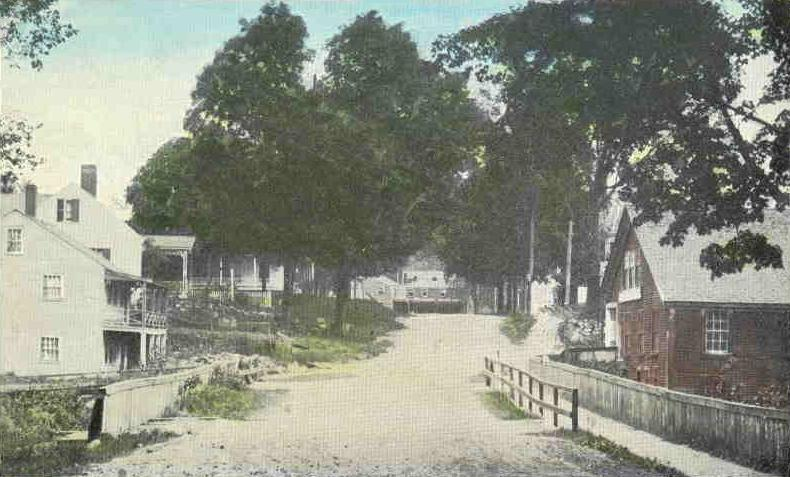
Iron Works bridge in 1910

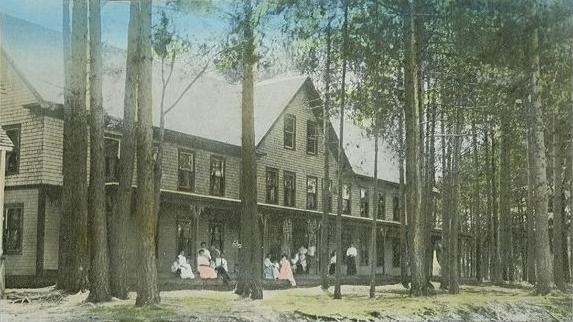
"The Pines" in 1910

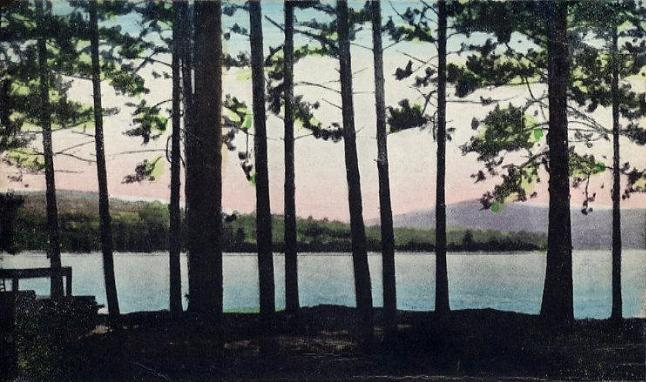
Crystal Lake in 1909

== Geography ==
According to the United States Census Bureau, the town has a total area of 59.6 square miles (154.4 km^{2}), of which 57.9 square miles (150.0 km^{2}) are land and 1.7 square miles (4.4 km^{2}) are water, comprising 2.89% of the town. A natural resources inventory published in 2004 noted the town's nine town forests and other dry and wetland protected areas as well as significant plant species. The highest point in Gilmanton is Mount Mack, at 1,945 feet (593 m) above sea level, on the town line with Gilford. Crystal Lake is in the east, and Shellcamp Pond is in the west. Gilmanton lies fully within the Merrimack River watershed.

The town is served by four state routes: 106, 129, 107 and 140. Route 107 is part of Old Province Road, an important road in New Hampshire's early history, and Route 106 is a well-traveled connection between Laconia and Concord. Route 140 is an east-west highway leading from Tilton to Alton. The intersection NH 107 and NH 140 is at Gilmanton Corners, one of the two major villages. Gilmanton Corner (or simply "Gilmanton", as shown on topographic maps) is the location of several historic buildings, including Gilmanton Academy and Centre Congregational Church. Gilmanton Ironworks is located in the eastern part of town along NH 140, near the outlet of Crystal Lake.

=== Adjacent municipalities ===
- Gilford (north)
- Alton (east)
- Barnstead (southeast)
- Loudon (south)
- Canterbury (southwest)
- Belmont (west)

== Demographics ==
Historical population
Census	Pop.	Note	%±
1790	2,613		—
1800	3,752		43.6%
1810	4,338		15.6%
1820	3,752		−13.5%
1830	3,816		1.7%
1840	3,485		−8.7%
1850	3,282		−5.8%
1860	2,373		−27.7%
1870	1,642		−30.8%
1880	1,485		−9.6%
1890	1,211		−18.5%
1900	1,100		−9.2%
1910	968		−12.0%
1920	814		−15.9%
1930	676		−17.0%
1940	708		4.7%
1950	754		6.5%
1960	736		−2.4%
1970	1,010		37.2%
1980	1,941		92.2%
1990	2,609		34.4%
2000	3,060		17.3%
2010	3,777		23.4%
2020	3,945		4.4%
2024 (est.)	4,072		3.2%
U.S. Decennial Census

Gilmanton's population was ranked #38, #31, and #37 in the country respectively in the 1790, 1800, and 1810 censuses.

As of the 2000 census, there were 3,060 people, 1,165 households, and 900 families residing in the town. The population density was 53.6 inhabitants per square mile (20.7/km^{2}). There were 1,848 housing units at an average density of 32.4 per square mile (12.5/km^{2}). The racial makeup of the town was 98.59% White, 0.10% African American, 0.20% Native American, 0.13% Asian, and 0.98% from two or more races. Hispanic or Latino of any race were 0.29% of the population.

There were 1,165 households, out of which 33.1% had children under the age of 18 living with them, 68.8% were married couples living together, 5.5% had a female householder with no husband present, and 22.7% were non-families. 17.2% of all households were made up of individuals, and 5.8% had someone living alone who was 65 years of age or older. The average household size was 2.62 and the average family size was 2.96.

In the town, the population was spread out, with 24.2% under the age of 18, 5.9% from 18 to 24, 30.5% from 25 to 44, 27.6% from 45 to 64, and 11.7% who were 65 years of age or older. The median age was 40 years. For every 100 females, there were 102.9 males. For every 100 females age 18 and over, there were 100.1 males.

The median income for a household in the town was $50,542, and the median income for a family was $51,712. Males had a median income of $37,077 versus $27,727 for females. The per capita income for the town was $23,163. About 3.3% of families and 5.9% of the population were below the poverty line, including 5.8% of those under age 18 and 9.1% of those age 65 or over.

== Government ==
In the New Hampshire Senate, Gilmanton is in the 6th district, represented by Republican James Gray. On the New Hampshire Executive Council, Gilmanton is in the 2nd district, represented by Democrat Andru Volinsky. In the United States House of Representatives, Gilmanton is in New Hampshire's 1st congressional district, represented by Democrat Chris Pappas.

== Sites of interest ==
- Carpenter Museum of Antique Outboard Motors
- Crystal Lake
- Griswold Scout Reservation which includes Hidden Valley Scout Camp and Camp Bell, Boy Scouts of America
- Village of Gilmanton Ironworks

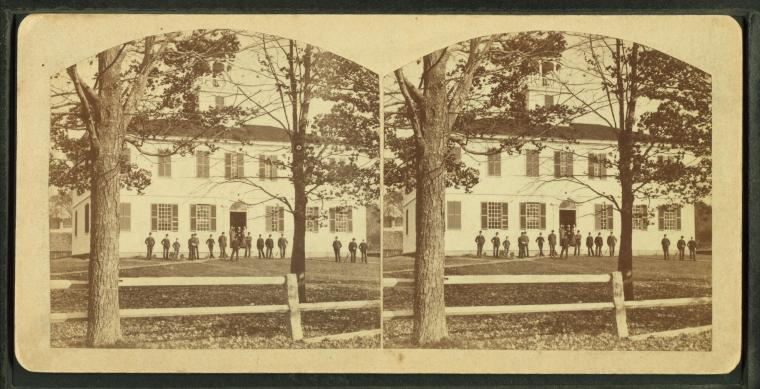
Gilmanton Academy c. 1869

== National Register of Historic Places ==
- Centre Congregational Church
- Gilmanton Academy
- Smith Meeting House

== Notable people ==
- John B. Bachelder (1825–1894), painter, photographer, historian
- William Badger (1779–1852), mill owner, 15th governor of New Hampshire
- Curtis Coe Bean (1828–1904), politician
- Rudi Blesh (1899–1985), jazz critic and enthusiast
- John C. Chase (1870–1937), shoe worker, politician
- David Cote (born 1969), author, New York theater critic raised in Gilmanton
- Ira Allen Eastman (1809–1881), U.S. congressman
- Nehemiah Eastman (1782–1856), U.S. congressman
- George G. Fogg (1813–1881), U.S. senator, diplomat; began his legal practice in Gilmanton Iron Works
- John R. French (1819–1890), U.S. congressman
- Charles A. Gilman (1833–1927), 9th lieutenant governor of Minnesota
- H. H. Holmes (1861–1896), serial killer
- Dudley Leavitt (1772–1851), author, publisher and was a selectman
- Grace Metalious (1924–1964), author of Peyton Place
- Charles H. Peaslee (1804–1866), U.S. congressman
- William Prescott (1788–1875), physician, politician, naturalist
- Edwin David Sanborn (1808–1885), educator
- John Sewell Sanborn (1819–1877), educator, judge, Canadian politician
- David Sellin (1930–2006), art historian, curator of the United States Capitol
- Thorsten Sellin (1896–1994), sociologist, criminologist; died in Gilmanton
- Ainsworth Rand Spofford (1825–1908), journalist, publisher; sixth Librarian of Congress
- Henry M. Spofford (1821–1880), judge
- Nathaniel Upham (1774–1829), politician, educator; lived in town briefly

== See also ==
- Atkinson and Gilmanton Academy Grant, New Hampshire
