= Northwood Lake =

Lake in New Hampshire, United States

- Location within New Hampshire Location within the United States
- Location: Rockingham County and Merrimack County, New Hampshire
- Coordinates: 43°13′1″N 71°15′48″W
- Primary inflows: Narrows Brook; Flat Meadow Brook; Griffin Brook
- Primary outflows: Little Suncook River
- Basin countries: United States
- Max. length: 3.1 mi (5.0 km)
- Max. width: 0.7 mi (1.1 km)
- Surface area: 653 acres (2.64 km^{2})
- Average depth: 12 ft (3.7 m)
- Max. depth: 20 ft (6.1 m)
- Surface elevation: 517 ft (158 m)
- Settlements: Northwood; Epsom

Northwood Lake is a 653-acre (2.64 km^{2}) water body located in Rockingham and Merrimack counties in central New Hampshire, United States, in the towns of Northwood and Epsom. The town of Deerfield occupies part of the southern shore. The outlet of the lake is the Little Suncook River, flowing west to the Suncook River, a tributary of the Merrimack River.

The lake is classified as a warmwater fishery, with observed species including smallmouth and largemouth bass, chain pickerel, and brown bullhead, and white perch.

Milfoil is present in the lake.

== See also ==
- List of lakes in New Hampshire
