= New Hampshire Route 129 =

State highway in New Hampshire, US

New Hampshire Route 129
- Map of central New Hampshire with NH 129 highlighted in red

Route information
- Maintained by NHDOT
- Length: 8.724 mi (14.040 km)

Major junctions
- West end: South Village Road in Loudon
- East end: NH 107 in Gilmanton

Location
- Country: United States
- State: New Hampshire
- Counties: Merrimack, Belknap

Highway system
- New Hampshire Highway System; Interstate; US; State; Turnpikes
← NH 128	→ NH 130

New Hampshire Route 129 (abbreviated NH 129) is an 8.724-mile-long (14.040 km) secondary east–west state highway in New Hampshire. The road runs between Loudon and Gilmanton.

The southwestern terminus of NH 129 is in Loudon at South Village Road, west of the intersection with New Hampshire Route 106. The northeastern terminus is at New Hampshire Route 107 in Gilmanton.

== Major intersections ==
County	Location	mi	km	Destinations	Notes
Merrimack	Loudon	0.000	0.000	NH 106 – Concord, Laconia	
Belknap	Gilmanton	8.724	14.040	NH 107 – Gilmanton, Pittsfield	
1.000 mi = 1.609 km; 1.000 km = 0.621 mi

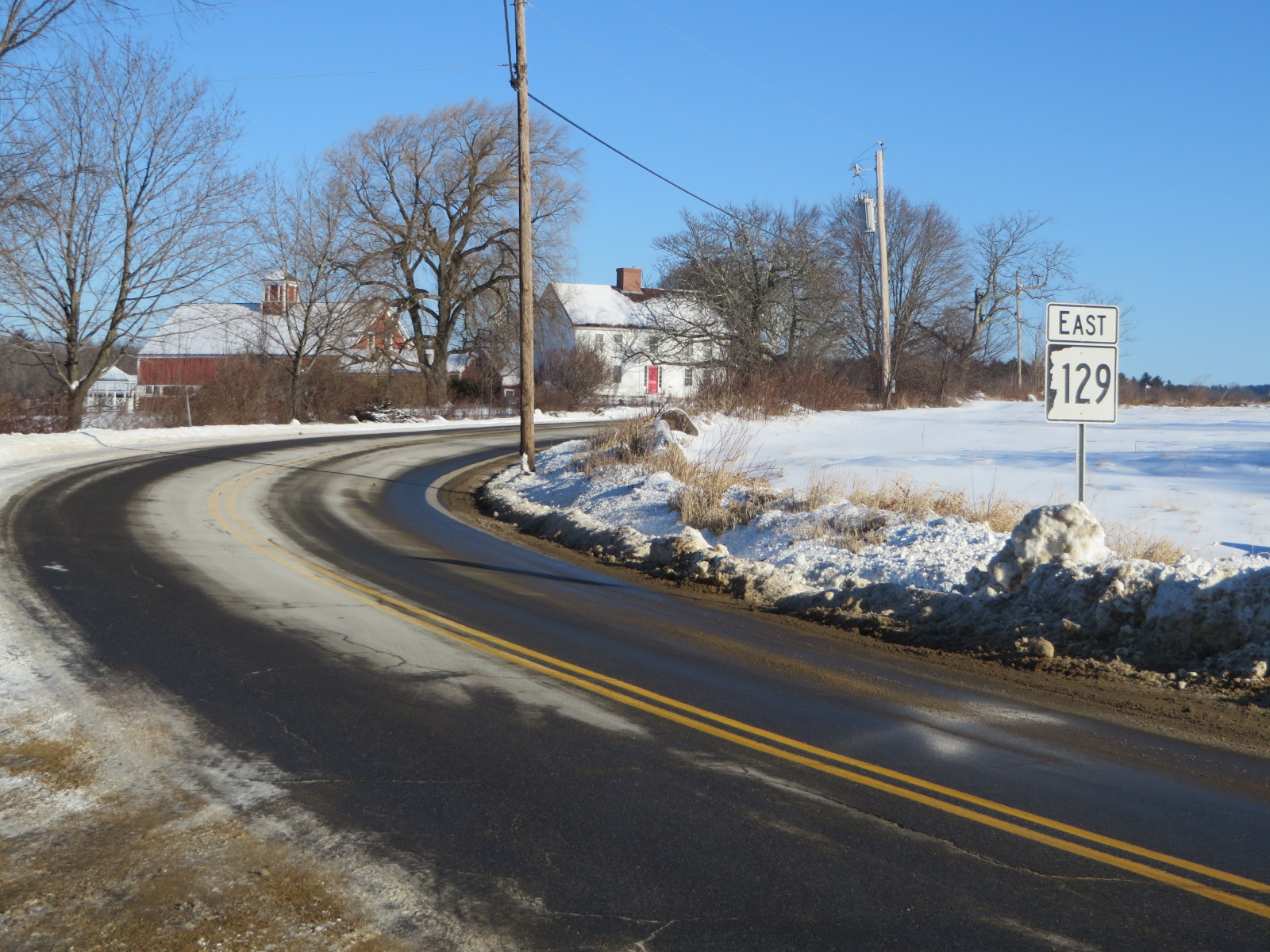
NH 129 in northeastern Loudon
