= New Hampshire Route 140 =

State highway in central New Hampshire, US

New Hampshire Route 140
- Map of central New Hampshire with NH 140 highlighted in red

Route information
- Maintained by NHDOT
- Length: 21.142 mi (34.025 km)

Major junctions
- West end: I-93 / US 3 / NH 11 / NH 132 in Tilton
- East end: NH 11 / NH 28A in Alton

Location
- Country: United States
- State: New Hampshire
- Counties: Belknap, Merrimack

Highway system
- New Hampshire Highway System; Interstate; US; State; Turnpikes
← NH 137	→ NH 141

New Hampshire Route 140 is a 21.142-mile-long (34.025 km) east–west state highway in central New Hampshire, running from Tilton to Alton. The western terminus of NH 140 is in Tilton at an intersection with U.S. Route 3, New Hampshire Route 11 and New Hampshire Route 132, located at exit 20 on Interstate 93. The eastern terminus is in Alton at NH 11 and New Hampshire Route 28A (Main Street). In Alton, the road is named the Frank C. Gilman Highway.

NH 140 (along with I-93) is commonly used as an alternative for motorists during the busiest NASCAR events at New Hampshire Motor Speedway in Loudon. The main highway to the speedway, New Hampshire Route 106, is converted to one-way traffic to accommodate the increased amount of traffic.

== Major intersections ==
County	Location	mi	km	Destinations	Notes
Belknap	Tilton	0.00	0.00	I-93; US 3 / NH 11 / NH 132 – Tilton, Franklin, Laconia	Western terminus; Exit 20 on I-93
Merrimack	No major junctions				
Belknap	Belmont	5.006	8.056	NH 106 – Laconia, Concord, Speedway	
Belknap	Gilmanton	8.940	14.388	NH 107 – Laconia, Pittsfield	
Belknap	Alton	21.142	34.025	NH 11 / NH 28A – Alton Bay, Wolfeboro, Rochester	Eastern terminus
1.000 mi = 1.609 km; 1.000 km = 0.621 mi
