= Loudon, New Hampshire =

- Town
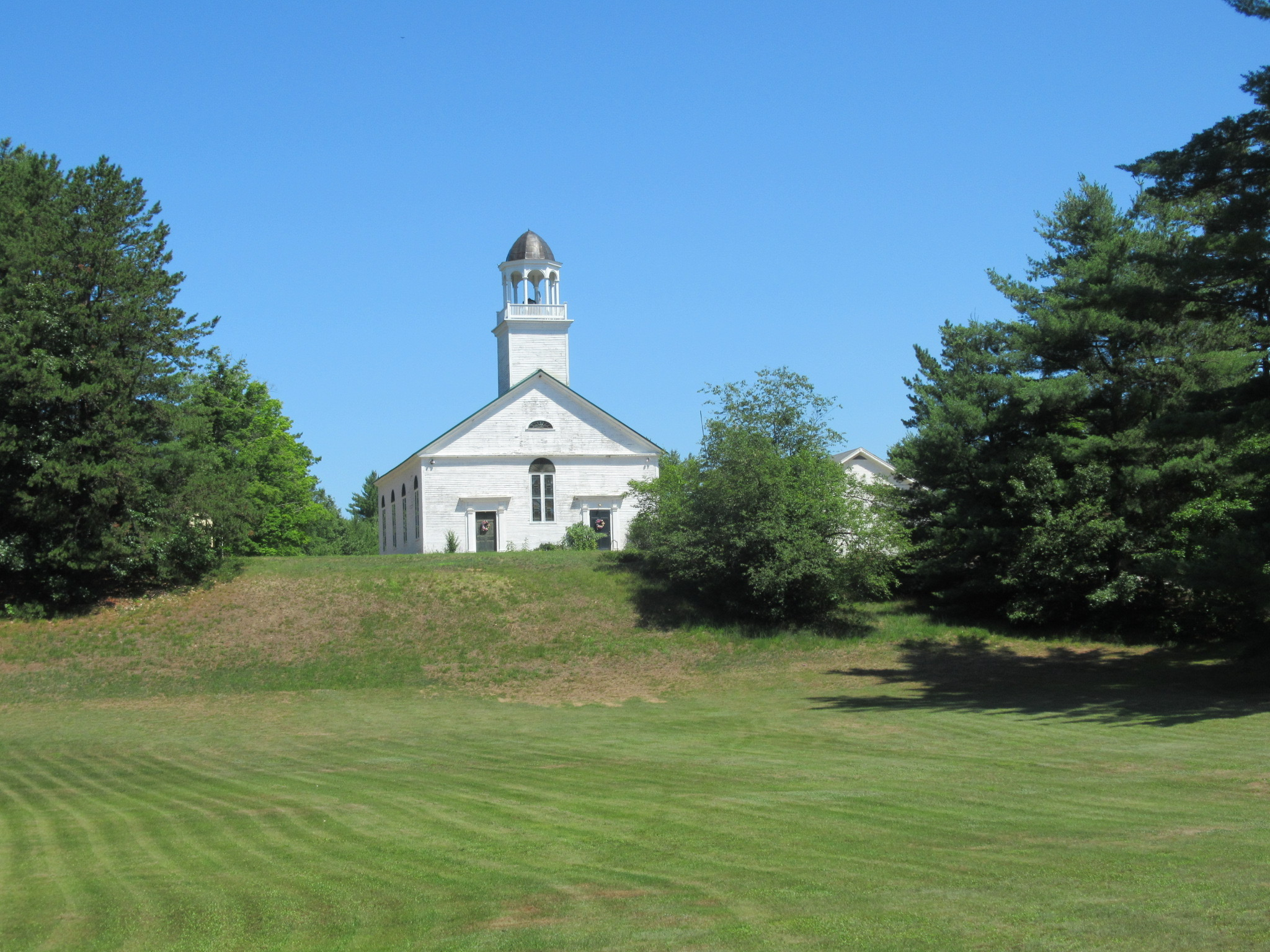
- Loudon Congregational Church north of the village center

- Seal

- Location in Merrimack County and the state of New Hampshire; the smaller shape within the town is the Loudon CDP.
- Coordinates: 43°17′08″N 71°28′04″W
- Country: United States
- State: New Hampshire
- County: Merrimack
- Incorporated: 1773
- Villages: Loudon; Loudon Center; Pearls Corner

Area
  - Total: 46.72 sq mi (121.00 km^{2})
  - Land: 46.16 sq mi (119.55 km^{2})
  - Water: 0.56 sq mi (1.45 km^{2}) 1.20%
- Elevation: 679 ft (207 m)

Population (2020)
  - Total: 5,576
  - Density: 121/sq mi (46.6/km^{2})
- Time zone: UTC-5 (Eastern)
  - Summer (DST): UTC-4 (Eastern)
- ZIP code: 03307
- Area code: 603
- FIPS code: 33-43380
- GNIS feature ID: 873652
- Website: www.loudonnh.org

Loudon is a town in Merrimack County, New Hampshire, United States. The population was 5,576 at the 2020 census. Loudon is the home of New Hampshire Motor Speedway.

The main village in town, where 711 people lived at the 2020 census, is defined as the Loudon census-designated place and is located along the Soucook River at the southern terminus of New Hampshire Route 129.

== History ==
The town of Loudon was originally incorporated by Governor John Wentworth on January 23, 1773. Loudon was originally formed of territory taken from Canterbury. The new town was named in honor of John Campbell, 4th Earl of Loudoun, a Scottish soldier and leader of British military forces in North America during the French and Indian War. Loudoun also helped to establish an independent company of colonial militia, called Rogers' Rangers, who were attached to the British Army during the French and Indian War. One of Lord Loudoun's aides, John Loudon McAdam, invented a new process called macadamizing for building roads that were more durable and less muddy than soil-based roads.

== Geography ==
According to the United States Census Bureau, the town has a total area of 46.7 square miles (121.0 km^{2}), of which 46.1 square miles (119.5 km^{2}) are land and 0.54 square miles (1.4 km^{2}) are water, comprising 1.45% of the town. The town's highest point is near its northern border, where an unnamed summit just north of the location known as Sabattus Heights reaches 1,050 feet (320 m) above sea level.

=== Adjacent municipalities ===
- Gilmanton (north)
- Barnstead (northeast)
- Pittsfield (east)
- Chichester (southeast)
- Pembroke (south)
- Concord (southwest)
- Canterbury (west)

== Demographics ==
Historical population
Census	Pop.	Note	%±
1790	1,084		—
1800	1,279		18.0%
1810	1,472		15.1%
1820	1,694		15.1%
1830	1,642		−3.1%
1840	1,640		−0.1%
1850	1,552		−5.4%
1860	1,638		5.5%
1870	1,282		−21.7%
1880	1,221		−4.8%
1890	1,000		−18.1%
1900	960		−4.0%
1910	838		−12.7%
1920	690		−17.7%
1930	801		16.1%
1940	920		14.9%
1950	1,012		10.0%
1960	1,194		18.0%
1970	1,707		43.0%
1980	2,454		43.8%
1990	4,114		67.6%
2000	4,481		8.9%
2010	5,317		18.7%
2020	5,576		4.9%
U.S. Decennial Census

As of the census of 2010, there were 5,317 people, 1,966 households, and 1,459 families living in the town. There were 2,081 housing units, of which 115, or 5.5%, were vacant. The racial makeup of the town was 98.3% white, 0.3% African American, 0.3% Native American, 0.4% Asian, 0.0% Native Hawaiian or Pacific Islander, 0.1% some other race, and 0.8% from two or more races. 0.8% of the population were Hispanic or Latino of any race.

Of the 1,966 households, 34.3% had children under the age of 18 living with them, 62.0% were headed by married couples living together, 7.8% had a female householder with no husband present, and 25.8% were non-families. 18.6% of all households were made up of individuals, and 6.5% were someone living alone who was 65 years of age or older. The average household size was 2.70, and the average family size was 3.05.

In the town, 23.2% of the population were under the age of 18, 6.8% were from 18 to 24, 24.4% from 25 to 44, 34.3% from 45 to 64, and 11.2% were 65 years of age or older. The median age was 41.9 years. For every 100 females, there were 98.3 males. For every 100 females age 18 and over, there were 94.8 males.

For the period 2011–2015, the estimated median annual income for a household was $65,417, and the median income for a family was $72,266. Male full-time workers had a median income of $57,422 versus $41,201 for females. The per capita income for the town was $30,248. 11.8% of the population and 6.9% of families were below the poverty line. 13.5% of the population under the age of 18 and 3.0% of those 65 or older were living in poverty.

== Education ==
- The town of Loudon sends children to Loudon Elementary School for kindergarten through fifth grade.
- Children in grades 6, 7, and 8 attend Merrimack Valley Middle School in Penacook.
- Children in grades 9, 10, 11, and 12 attend Merrimack Valley High School in Penacook.

== Media ==
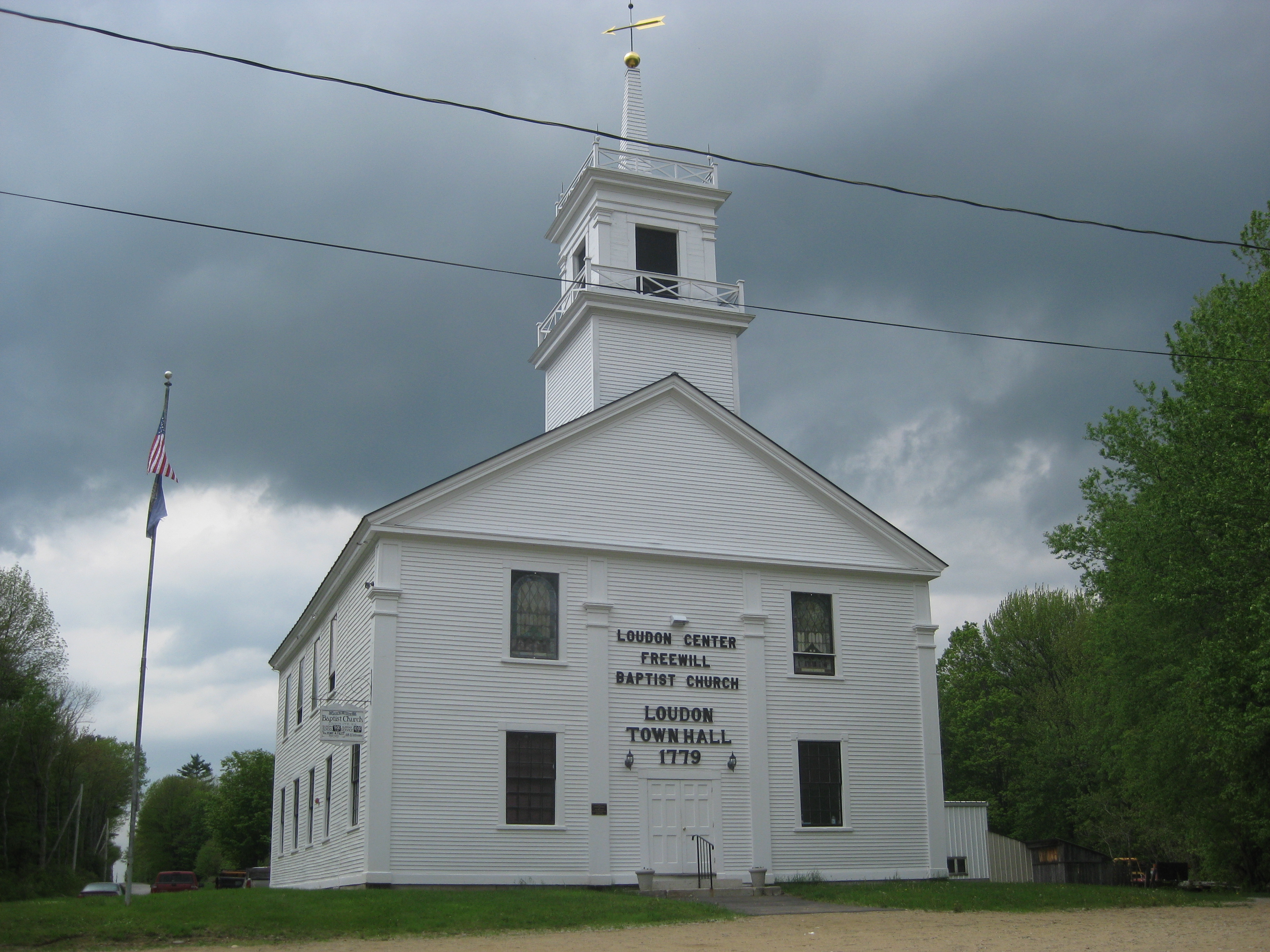
Former Loudon Town Hall

The Loudon Communications Council publishes a monthly newspaper, The Loudon Ledger, that is freely distributed by mail in town, with digital PDF versions published on the Town of Loudon website. As of April 2026, the digital archive has all issues of The Loudon Ledger published from October 2005 onward as well as the July 2005 issue.

== Sites of interest ==
Loudon is home to the New Hampshire Motor Speedway, which in the NASCAR Cup Series is home to the Mobil 1 301 and formerly the ISM Connect 300, formerly in the NASCAR Xfinity Series the SciAps 200, in the NASCAR Craftsman Truck Series the EJP 175, in the American Canadian Tour the Bond Auto Invitational, and is also home to the Loudon Classic, known as "America's Oldest Motorcycle Race".
