= Frederick Knowles =

Frederick Knowles may refer to:

- Frederick John Knowles, Scottish World War I flying ace
- Frederick Knowles (footballer), English footballer
- Frederic Lawrence Knowles, American poet
