= Jick =

Jick has been used as a nickname and a surname. Notable people with the name include:

== Nickname ==
- Zack "Jick" Johnson of Kingdom of Loathing
- Tsuyoshi Ujiki (born 1957), Japanese entertainer, actor, musician, and singer

== Surname ==
- Andy Jick (1952–2019), American public address announcer
- Hershel Jick, American medical researcher
