= Weldon Haire =

American public address announcer

M. Weldon Haire (January 5, 1917 – August 9, 1982) was an American public address announcer for the Boston Celtics and the Boston Bruins.

Haire's career as the Celtics' public-address announcer began in 1949. In 1972, he became the Bruins' public-address announcer after the death of Frank Fallon. He was succeeded as the Celtics' PA man by Andy Jick in 1980, but remained with the Bruins until his death after the 1981–82 season.

Haire also did PA for the Beanpot hockey tournament.

Haire was also a teacher, coach, sportswriter, radio host and insurance man. While serving as the basketball coach at The Tilton School, Haire coached future National Basketball Association player Worthy Patterson.

Preceded by Frank Fallon	Boston Celtics Public Address Announcer; 1949–1980	Succeeded by Andy Jick
Preceded by Frank Fallon	Boston Bruins Public Address Announcer; 1972–1982	Succeeded by Joel Perlmutter
