= Flower Lane Church =

Coordinates: 26°05′16.64″N 119°17′43.83″E

Flower Lane Church (Huaxiang Christian Church)
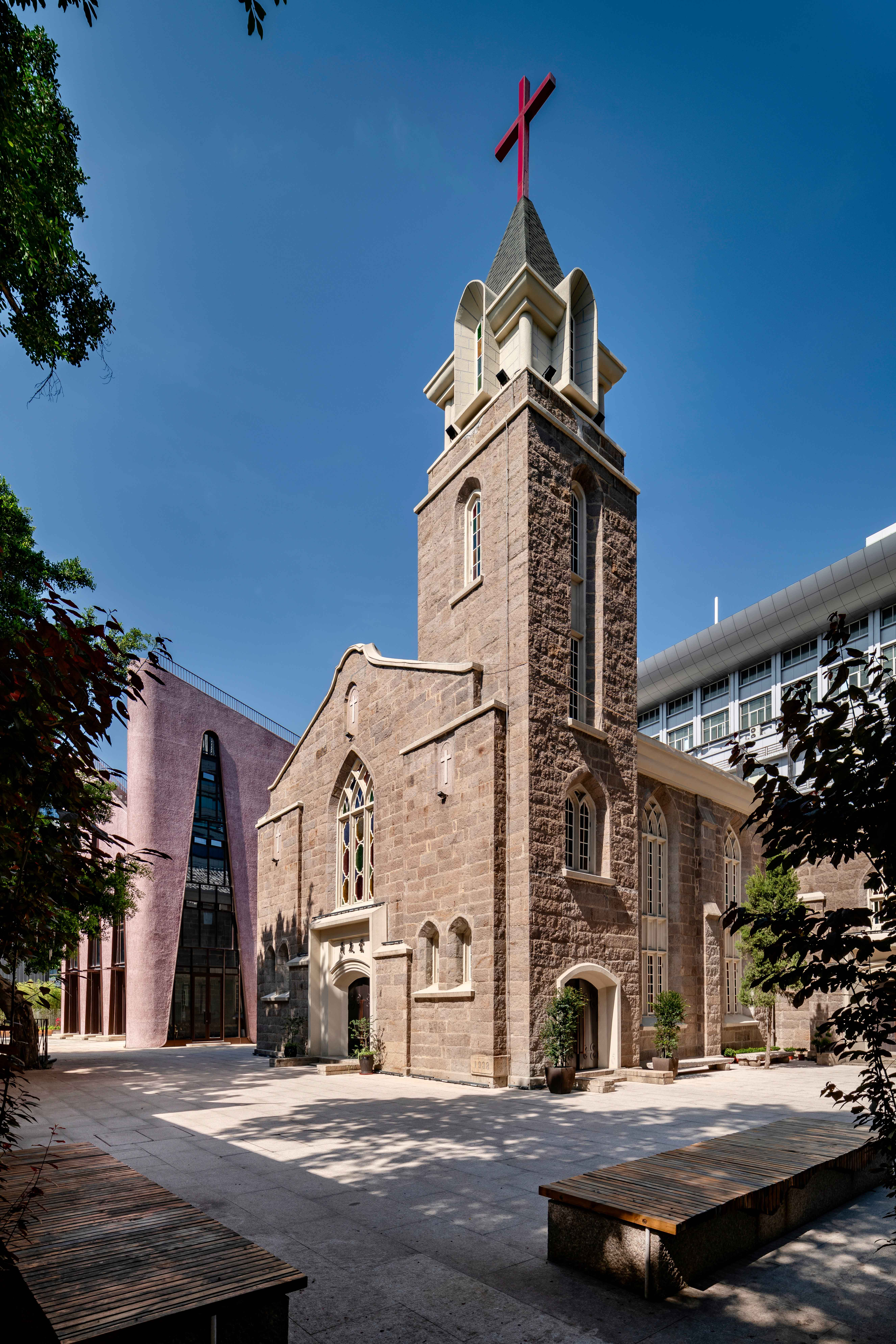
- Flower Lane Church (Huaxiang Christian Church)
- Location: Fuzhou
- Country: China
- Denomination: Methodist
- Website: fzhxjt.com.cn (in Chinese)

History
- Former name(s): Central Institutional Church, Foochow; Siông-iū-dòng (尚友堂)
- Status: Church
- Founded: 1915
- Founder(s): Rev. Yu Xingli (余兴礼); Rev. John Gowdy

Architecture
- Functional status: Active

Specifications
- Materials: Stone

Flower Lane Church, also Huaxiang Christian Church (Chinese: 花巷基督教堂; Pinyin: Huāxiàng Jīdū Jiàotáng; Foochow Romanized: Huă-háe̤ng Gĭ-dók Gáu-dòng) is a Christian church in Fuzhou, China.

== Location ==
The church is located at Flower Lane (花巷) No. 7, East Street Crossroads (东街口, Dongjiekou), the most prosperous downtown area of Gulou District, Fuzhou. It is the first Methodist church built within the walled city of Fuzhou.

== History ==
The history of Flower Lane Church can be traced back to 1863 when the American Methodist Episcopal Mission in Fuzhou secured a house and lot on East Street (东街) within the city walls. In 1864, a chapel known as East Street Church was erected there, but was demolished by a mob the next year. It was not until 50 years later that the Methodist Episcopal Mission decided to make another attempt to erect a church within downtown Fuzhou.

In 1915, Rev. John Gowdy (then superintendent of the Methodist Episcopal Mission) and Rev. Yu Xingli (余兴礼, a Chinese Methodist pastor) purchased on East Street what used to be the mansion of a Ryukyuan king in Qing Dynasty and rebuilt it into a city institutional church named Central Institutional Church or Siong Iu Dong (尚友堂, Foochow Romanized: Siông-iū-dòng, lit. "church for social intercourse"). The first baptism was held on September 5 of the same year. In 1938 the building was subsequently reconstructed under charge of Rev. Xu Rongfan (许荣藩) into a large granite chapel capable of holding a congregation of some 1000 people. The building was designed by Lin Jixi (林缉西), a local architect first trained by the Methodist mission's Union Architectural Service (协和建筑部) in Fuzhou and subsequently sent to architecture school in the USA.

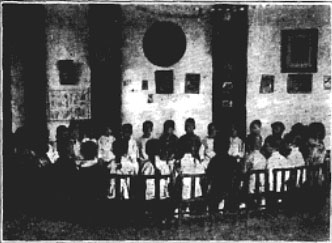
Kindergarten children at Siong Iu Dong, ca. 1923

In the Republic of China Era, Siong Iu Dong was an influential religious organization, working chiefly for the official and literary class. It established Jinde School (进德学校, later changed to Jinde Girls' Middle School / 进德女中) which was engaged in the teaching of modern culture and served as the preparatory school for Foochow Anglo-Chinese College (鹤龄英华中学), and also founded Siong Iu Dong Kindergarten. But all school activities were put to an end during the Japanese Occupation in the 1940s.

After the communists' 1949 victory in the Chinese Civil War, all foreign missions were forced to leave this country and forbidden from interacting with churches in China. In the 1950s Siong Iu Dong was affiliated to the Three-Self Patriotic Movement (TSPM), subordinate to the communist control. During the Cultural Revolution (1966–1976), however, even the TSPM was strictly banned, and all church services ceased. The Senior Pastor Rev. Liu Yangfen (刘扬芬) was severely persecuted for his outspoken Christian faith.

On October 28, 1979, Siong Iu Dong became the first church in Fuzhou to restore religious activities, with its name changed to Flower Lane Church, after the street name of its location. Rev. Liu Yangfen was assigned as pastor in charge.

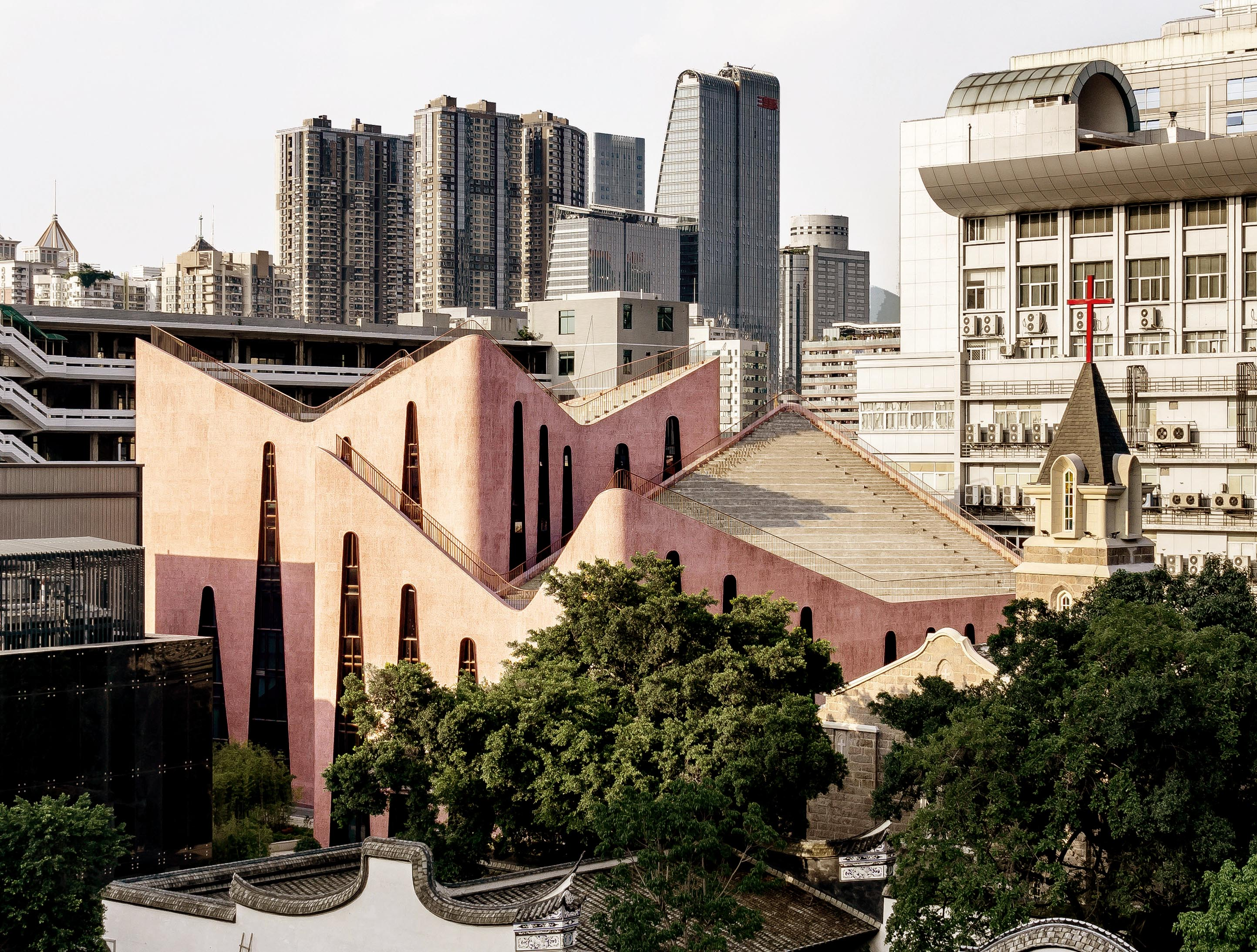
Old and new Huaxiang Church after completion, ca. 2019.

The main building of the Flower Lane Church underwent renovation in 2005. In the following decade, the number of congregants kept growing, until the 80-year-old building could no longer satisfy the community's spatial needs.

In 2014 the Huaxiang Christian Congregation under Rev. Chen Lifu (陈立福) commissioned the German architect Dirk U. Moench (德克) to design a new community center on the plot of land adjacent to the historic monument. Alongside a new service hall for over 1500 people the building comprises several prayer venues, libraries, study areas as well as a roof amphitheater for outdoor events.

Featuring the "largest pipe organ" in a Chinese church, the service hall also services prophane music concerts for the general public.

== Famous people associated with the church ==
- John Gowdy (高智; 1869–1963), Methodist missionary to China, founder of the church. He was elected a Bishop of the Methodist Episcopal Church in 1930.
- Frank Thomas Cartwright (葛惠良; 1884–1964), Methodist missionary to China. He arrived in Foochow in 1917 and was in charge of the church until his eviction in 1949.
- Chen Wenyuan (陈文渊; 1897–1968), Bishop of the Methodist Episcopal Church in China. He became a pastor of the church in the 1930s, and was persecuted in the 1950s.
- Liu Yangfen (刘扬芬; 1915–2010), son of Methodist converts in Foochow. Liu graduated from Vanderbilt University, and was pastor of the church from 1950 to 1966 and from 1979 to 1985. He was persecuted during Cultural Revolution and was sent for reeducation to the labor farms in Northern Fujian. In 1985 he left China for New York City and started the Church of Grace to Fujianese (纽约基督闽恩教会) for Fuzhou immigrants.

== Photo gallery ==
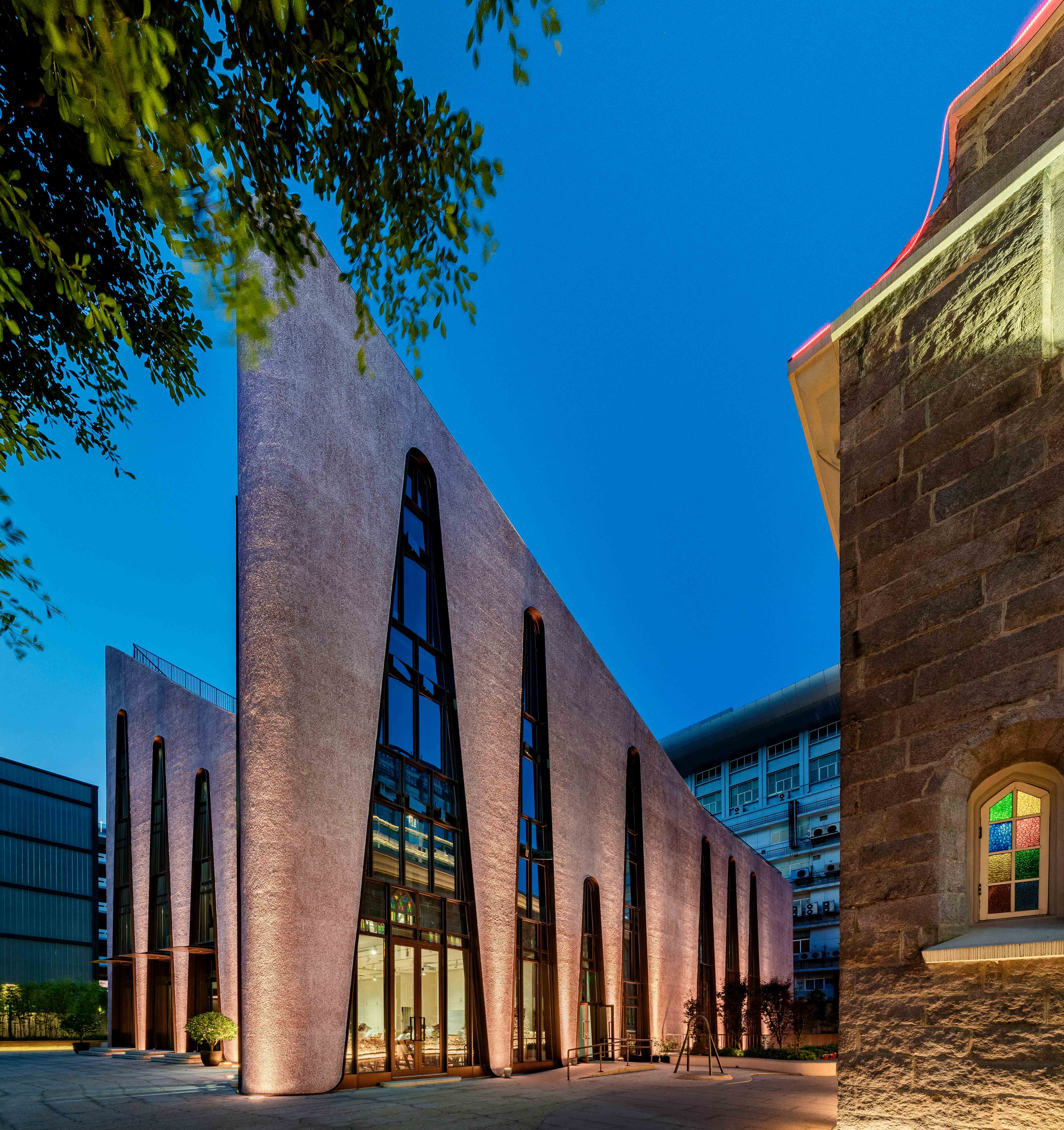
Historic Church and new community center at night, ca. 2019.

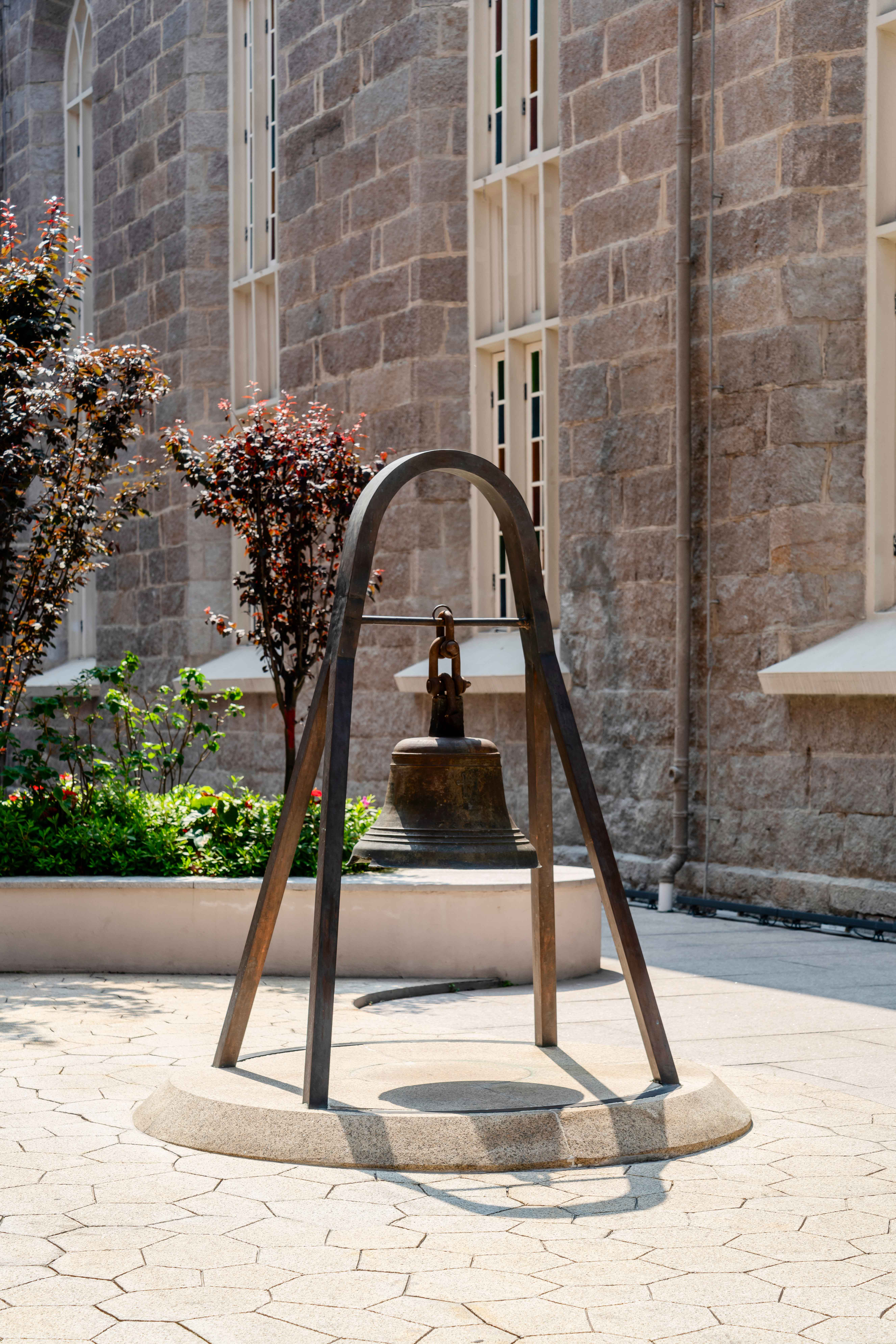
Historic Bell at its new display position between historic church and new community center, ca. 2019.

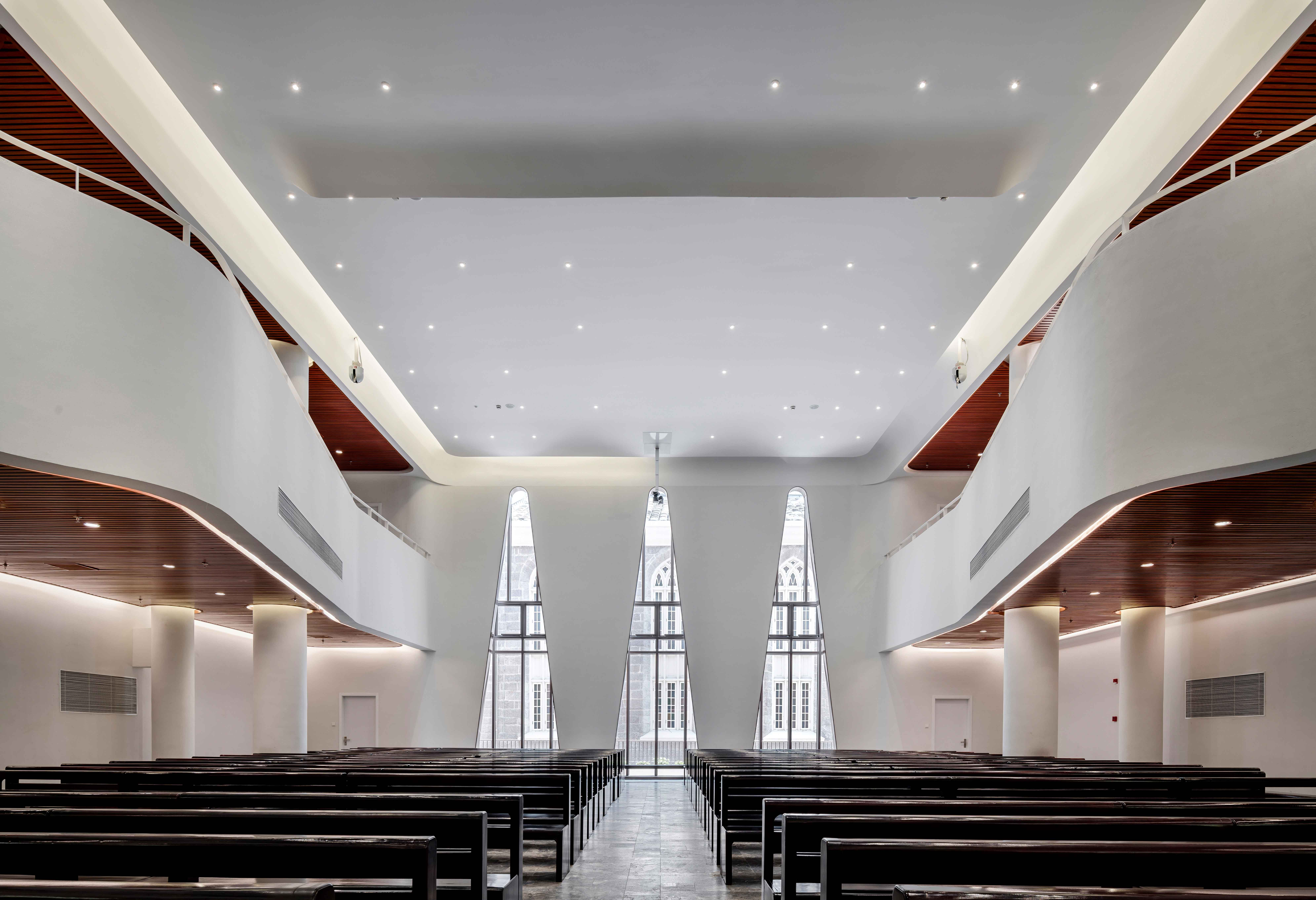
Historic church windows as seen from the interior of the new service hall, ca. 2019.

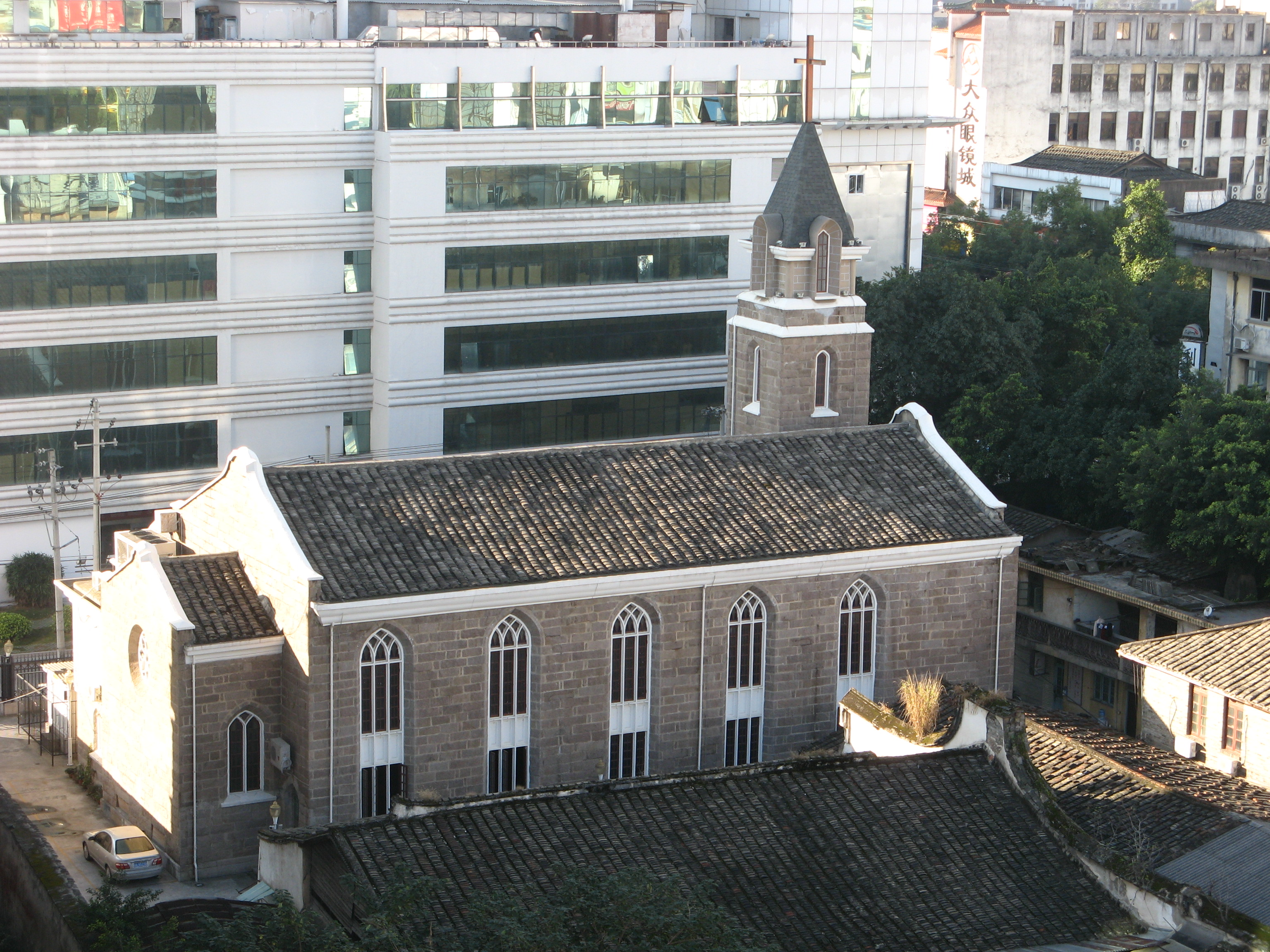
Historic church in original setting prior to expansion.

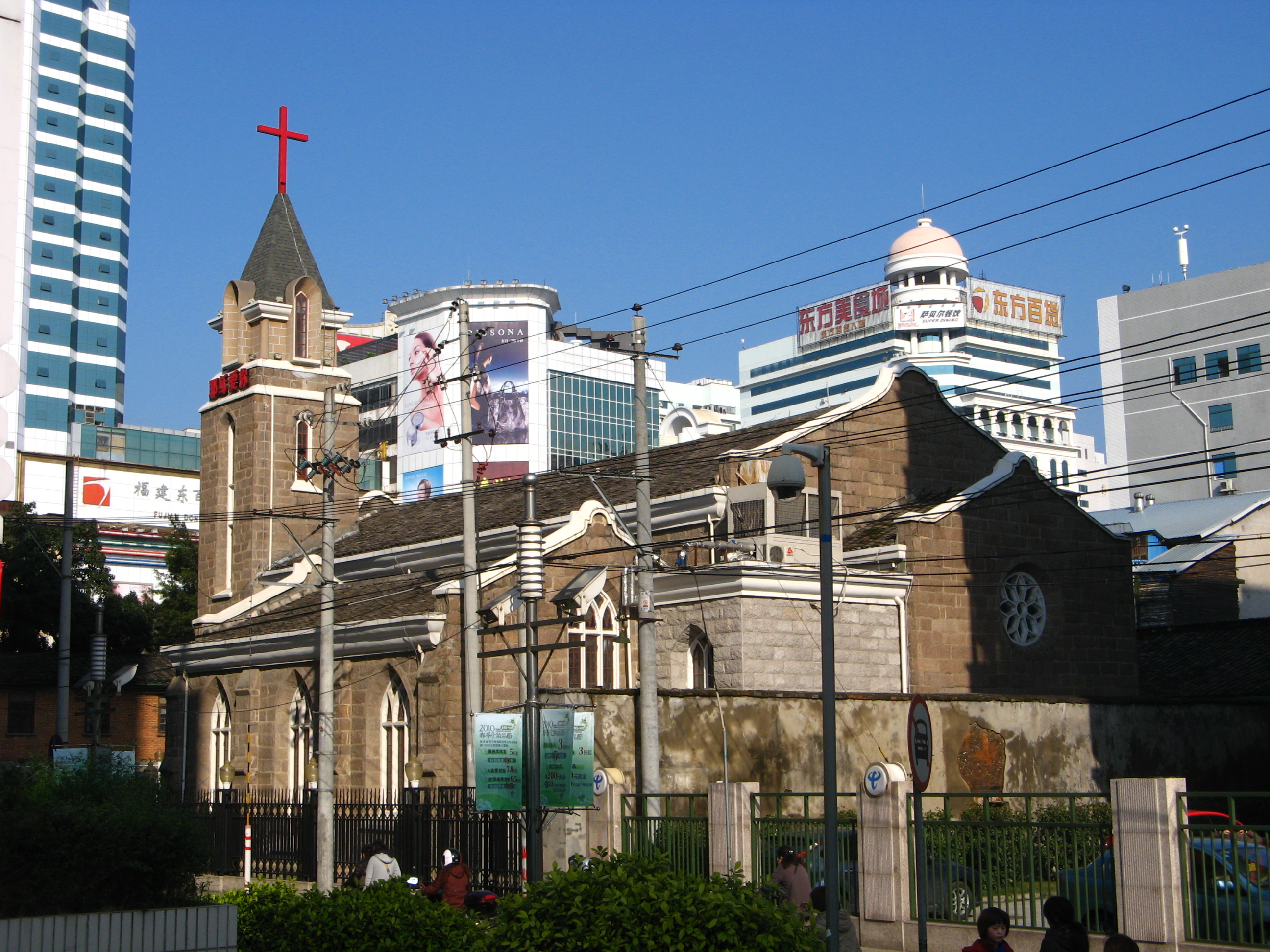
Church exterior

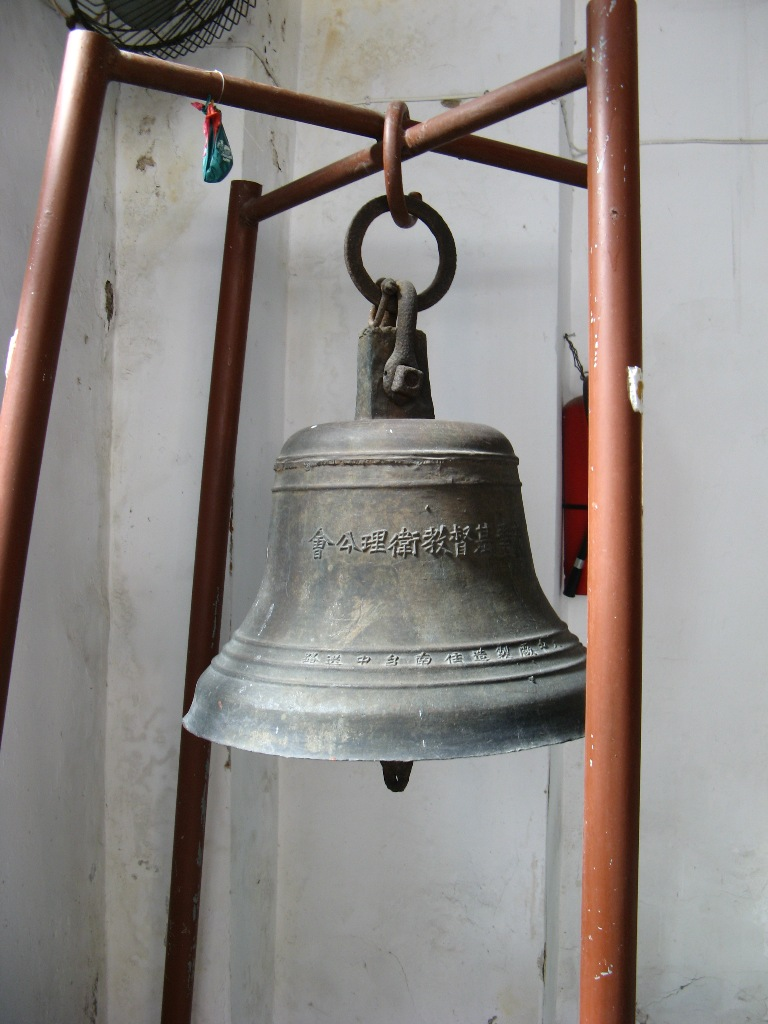
The retired church bell. The inscription reads "China Methodism" (中華基督教衛理公會).
