= Rikert Outdoor Center =

Cross Country Ski Area in Vermont

Coordinates: 43.9547°N 72.9910°W

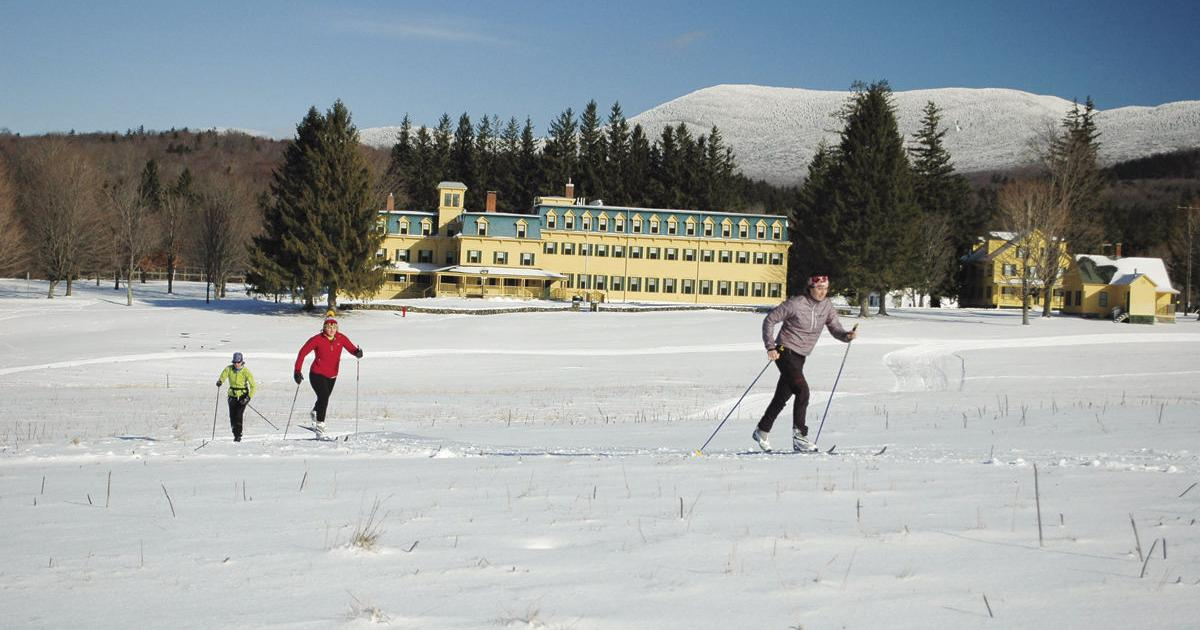
Skiers at Rikert Outdoor Center

Rikert Outdoor Center, formerly known as Rikert Nordic Center, is a cross-country skiing, snowshoeing, and FatBiking area in Ripton, Vermont. It is owned and operated by Middlebury College and located 20 minutes southeast of Middlebury, Vermont on Middlebury College's Breadloaf Campus, where it is home to the Middlebury College Nordic Ski Team.

== History ==
Ski touring at the Breadloaf Mountain Campus began in 1975 with 4 trails, with a barn serving as ski lodge.

By 2012, the number of groomed trails had grown to 25. In 2012 the Tormondsen Family Race Course, a 5 km FIS certified homologated course designed by John Morton, was built.

In 2013, 5 km of snowmaking was installed (on the Tormondsen Family Race Course).

By 2015, the trails grew to 55 km in total length.
