= Mike Walsh (ice hockey) =

American ice hockey player

- Born: April 3, 1962 (age 64) New York City, New York, U.S.
- Height: 6 ft 1 in (185 cm)
- Weight: 192 lb (87 kg; 13 st 10 lb)
- Position: Center
- Shot: Right
- Played for: New York Islanders
- NHL draft: Undrafted
- Playing career: 1984–1993

Michael Walsh (born April 3, 1962) is an American former professional ice hockey player who played in the National Hockey League (NHL).

== Early life ==
Walsh was born in New York City. He played for the Colgate Raiders men's ice hockey team for four seasons.

== Career ==
Walsh spent the first two seasons of his professional career with Malmö IF in Sweden. Towards the end of the 1985–86 season, he returned to North America, playing in two games for the Springfield Indians of the American Hockey League (AHL). Walsh signed a contract in the off-season with Springfield's parent team, the New York Islanders, and played the next four seasons with the organization. He played in 14 games over parts of two NHL seasons with the Islanders. After the 1989–90 season, during which he was a member of Springfield's Calder Cup winning team, Walsh played a season in Italy for SG Cortina. He played two more seasons in the AHL before retiring after the 1992–93 season. Following his playing career, Walsh became the head coach at the Tilton School and Proctor Academy.

== Career statistics ==
			Regular season					Playoffs
Season	Team	League	GP	G	A	Pts	PIM	GP	G	A	Pts	PIM
1980–81	Colgate Red Raiders	ECAC	35	10	15	25	62	—	—	—	—	—
1981–82	Colgate Red Raiders	ECAC	26	2	7	9	42	—	—	—	—	—
1982–83	Colgate Red Raiders	ECAC	24	9	14	23	50	—	—	—	—	—
1983–84	Colgate Red Raiders	ECAC	35	16	17	33	94	—	—	—	—	—
1984–85	Malmö IF	Sweden 3	33	41	23	64		—	—	—	—	—
1985–86	Malmö IF	Sweden 2	31	44	24	68	18	4	5	2	7	4
1985–86	Springfield Indians	AHL	2	1	0	1	0	—	—	—	—	—
1986–87	Springfield Indians	AHL	67	20	26	46	32	—	—	—	—	—
1987–88	Springfield Indians	AHL	77	27	23	50	48	—	—	—	—	—
1987–88	New York Islanders	NHL	1	0	0	0	0	—	—	—	—	—
1988–89	Springfield Indians	AHL	68	31	34	65	73	—	—	—	—	—
1988–89	New York Islanders	NHL	13	2	0	2	4	—	—	—	—	—
1989–90	Springfield Indians	AHL	69	34	20	54	43	8	2	2	4	10
1990–91	SG Cortina	Serie A	36	15	21	36	49	6	7	4	11	19
1991–92	Maine Mariners	AHL	76	27	24	51	42	—	—	—	—	—
1992–93	Providence Bruins	AHL	5	2	0	2	8	—	—	—	—	—
NHL totals			14	2	0	2	4	—	—	—	—	—
