= Lakes Region League =

- Classification: New England Preparatory School Athletic Council
- No. of teams: 8
- Region: New England

The Lakes Region League (LRL) is an interscholastic athletic league of preparatory schools in New Hampshire and Vermont. It is listed among the leagues and conferences of the New England Preparatory School Athletic Council (NEPSAC), whose directory identifies eight member schools.

== Member schools ==
NEPSAC's league directory lists the following eight schools as members of the Lakes Region League.

Lakes Region League member schools
School	Location	State
Brewster Academy	Wolfeboro	New Hampshire
Holderness School	Holderness	New Hampshire
Kimball Union Academy	Meriden	New Hampshire
New Hampton School	New Hampton	New Hampshire
Proctor Academy	Andover	New Hampshire
St. Paul's School	Concord	New Hampshire
Tilton School	Tilton	New Hampshire
Vermont Academy	Saxtons River	Vermont

=== Sport-specific participation ===
Published descriptions of Lakes Region competition include additional schools in some sports. Brewster Academy's cross-country overview lists Cardigan Mountain School, Dublin School, and Putney School among its Lakes Region opponents.

== League identity ==
In July 2025, the league introduced a new visual identity, including a shield depicting mountains and a lake to represent the geography of its schools in New Hampshire and Vermont. The branding also included alternate designs using the abbreviation "LRL", with implementation planned for the 2025–26 school year.

== Sports and competition ==
Lakes Region League competition includes regular-season schedules and postseason championship events. Championship formats vary by sport. In baseball, schools distinguish between regular-season and tournament titles; Proctor Academy won both championships in 2017.

League championships are distinct from NEPSAC championships. For example, Brewster Academy's girls' soccer program reported 18 Lakes Region titles and eight NEPSAC championships since 2000 in its September 2024 program overview.

== Baseball championships ==
The league recognizes regular-season and tournament championships. Tilton School's published records distinguish its regular-season titles in 2012, 2013, and 2014 from its tournament championships in 2014, 2015, and 2019.

=== Championship results ===
The following table lists documented championship results. A dash indicates that information is not provided. "Unspecified" indicates that the cited source does not distinguish between a regular-season and tournament championship. The table is not a complete list of titles awarded during this period.

Selected Lakes Region baseball championship results, 2012–2026
Year	Championship type	Champion	Runner-up	Final score	Notes	Reference
2026	Tournament	St. Paul's School	Vermont Academy	11–10	—	
2025	Tournament	Vermont Academy	Kimball Union Academy	10–0	—	
2024	Tournament	St. Paul's School	New Hampton School	7–1	—	
2023	Unspecified	St. Paul's School	—	—		
2022	Tournament	Vermont Academy	St. Paul's School	6–3	Eight innings	
2019	Tournament	Tilton School	New Hampton School	4–3	—	
2018	Tournament	New Hampton School	Kimball Union Academy	—	—	
2017	Regular season and tournament	Proctor Academy	Holderness School	3–2	Finished 15–0	
2016	Unspecified	New Hampton School	—	—		
2015	Unspecified	Tilton School	—	—	—	
2014	Regular season and tournament	Tilton School	—	—	—	
2013	Regular season	Tilton School	—	—	—	
2012	Unspecified	New Hampton School	—	—	Northeastern identifies New Hampton as a league champion; Tilton separately lists a regular-season title	

== Selected baseball players ==
The following table lists selected baseball players who attended Lakes Region League schools, including league award recipients and players who subsequently competed in college or professional baseball. Dates identify documented school seasons or graduating classes where available.

Season(s) or period	Player	School	Recognition or subsequent career
Before 2012	Roberto Hernández	New Hampton School	Subsequently played 17 seasons in Major League Baseball, earning two All-Star selections and recording 326 saves in 1,010 appearances.
2004–2005	Colin Lynch	New Hampton School	Helped New Hampton win consecutive Lakes Region championships and was named team Most Valuable Player as a senior in 2005. Subsequently pitched for St. John's University and was selected by the San Diego Padres in the 40th round of the 2008 Major League Baseball draft.
Before 2012	Scott Szpyrka	New Hampton School	Subsequently played Division I baseball at Central Michigan University.
2008–2009	Cole Warren	New Hampton School	A senior team captain who received New Hampton's Male Spring Athlete Award in 2008 and 2009. Subsequently played at the University of Rhode Island and Southern New Hampshire University. At SNHU, earned first-team All-Northeast-10 honors in 2015, recording a 2.11 earned run average and 84 strikeouts in 59⅔ innings. Pitched eight shutout innings in SNHU's 2014 conference championship victory.
2011–2013	John Witkowski	Tilton School	Attended Tilton from 2011 to 2013 before transferring to Avon Old Farms. Subsequently pitched for Boston College, including appearances in the 2016 NCAA regional and super regional tournaments.
2014	Trevor Massey	Tilton School	Named Lakes Region Pitcher of the Year after recording an 8–0 record, a 0.45 earned run average and 71 strikeouts during Tilton's championship season. Subsequently played for Boston College.
2015–2016	Teddy Beaudet	New Hampton School	Named Lakes Region Player of the Year in 2015 and earned three league All-Star selections. Subsequently played for Northeastern University.
2016 graduating class	Chris Hopkins	New Hampton School	Subsequently joined Stetson University's baseball program before transferring to Bentley University. Earned Northeast-10 All-Rookie recognition in 2018, batting .271 with 28 runs batted in.
2017	Matt Braley	Proctor Academy	A senior captain on Proctor's undefeated 15–0 team. Pitched in the team's 3–2 championship victory over Holderness, striking out the final two batters with the bases loaded.
2018	Noah Spaulding	Kimball Union Academy	Pitched six innings for Kimball Union in the Lakes Region championship game against New Hampton School.
2019	Jake Nardone	Tilton School	A 2019 graduate who subsequently played for Endicott College and earned ABCA/Rawlings All-Region recognition as a designated hitter in 2021.
School seasons not specified	Alex Rives	New Hampton School	Subsequently played at Plymouth State University, becoming the team's starting center fielder and receiving College Sports Communicators Academic All-District recognition in 2024.
School seasons not specified	Noah Bolduc	New Hampton School	A New Hampton baseball captain and recipient of the team's Coaches Award. Subsequently played catcher and outfield at St. Lawrence University.
2020 graduating class	Jake Procaccianti	New Hampton School	Selected to Perfect Game's 2020 preseason Northeast All-Region team.
2021	Hugh Barrett	New Hampton School	Earned first-team Lakes Region recognition and his team's Most Valuable Player award as a senior. Subsequently played for Saint Joseph's College of Maine.
2022–2023	Dylan McCarthy	Vermont Academy	Recorded a 5–1 record, a 1.10 earned run average and 73 strikeouts in 38⅓ innings during Vermont Academy's 2022 championship season. Served as a senior captain in 2023 and subsequently pitched for George Mason University.
2022	Harry Meehan	New Hampton School	Left-handed pitcher who continued his college career at Bridgewater State and Suffolk. Selected to New Hampshire Hardball's 2023 Senior American Legion All-Star list after recording a 1.68 ERA and 45 strikeouts in 33 innings for Laconia Post 1, as reported that July.
2023–2024	Kieran McNamara	New Hampton School	In 2023, batted .469 with a .526 on-base percentage, a .979 slugging percentage, six home runs, 26 runs batted in and 21 runs scored across 14 recorded games. Led the team's published statistics in batting average, on-base percentage, slugging percentage, home runs, hits, runs batted in and runs scored. Subsequently joined Trinity College's baseball program as a right-handed pitcher.
2024	Danny Sullivan	St. Paul's School	Named Lakes Region Player of the Year, team Most Valuable Player and an All-NEPSAC selection.
2025	Lucas Sinacola; Logan Sinacola	Vermont Academy	Both received All-NEPSAC recognition in 2025.
2026	Kaiden McCarthy	Vermont Academy	Named Gatorade Vermont Baseball Player of the Year and recognized as a two-time Lakes Region Pitcher of the Year. Recorded a 3–0 record, a 0.72 earned run average and 42 strikeouts during the 2026 season.
2026	Griffin Taylor	New Hampton School	Earned All-NEPSAC and Lakes Region All-Star recognition, along with the Lakes Region Champion of Character award in baseball. Posted a .455 batting average, a .661 on-base percentage and 28 runs scored in the team's published 2026 statistics. Committed to play baseball at Skidmore College.
2026	Levi Fernandez	New Hampton School	A sophomore right-handed pitcher in the class of 2028. Recorded a 5–0 record in six appearances, including five starts, with 33 strikeouts and one walk in 26⅔ innings. His earned run average was listed as 0.53 by MaxPreps.

=== Current head coaches ===
The following coaches were listed as heads of their schools' varsity baseball programs as of October 2026.

Head baseball coaches, October 2026
School	Head coach	Reference
Brewster Academy	Robert Burr	
Holderness School	Ben Drummond	
Kimball Union Academy	Chad Sturgeon	
New Hampton School	Justin Carey	
Proctor Academy	Mark Tremblay	
St. Paul's School	Parker Chase	
Tilton School	Michael Giovanditto	
Vermont Academy	Russell Williams	
