= Albert Batchellor =

American politician (1850–1913)

Albert Stillman Batchellor (April 22, 1850 – June 15, 1913) was a lawyer, politician, and historian who wrote about New Hampshire and early federal history. The Library of Congress has a file on him. He was president of the New Hampshire State Bar Association.

He was born in Bethlehem, New Hampshire, graduated from the seminary in Tilton, New Hampshire, now known as Tilton School, in 1868, and Dartmouth College in 1872. He studied law with Harry Bingham in Littleton and passed the bar in 1875. He married Harriet A. Copeland and had three children. He was a member of the Masons.

Batchellor was active in politics. A Republican, he joined the Democrats in supporting Horace Greeley's political movement before returning to the Republican mainstream. He was chosen as a state representative for Littleton in 1887, 1888, and 1889, and served as a Solicitor for Grafton County, New Hampshire. The governor appointed him to compile the state's historical papers. In 1901, he was president of the New Hampshire Bar Association.

The Boston Herald ran a news story related to him.

== Works ==
- The Government and Laws of New Hampshire Before the Establishment of the Province. 1623-1679, by Albert Stillman Batchellor
- Tenure of Office of the Judges of the Supreme Court of the State under the Constitution: An Address Prepared for Delivery Before the New Hampshire Bar Association at Concord, March 4, 1902, by Albert Stillman Batchellor
- Miscellaneous revolutionary documents of New Hampshire, including the association test, the pension rolls, and other important papers compiled by Albert Stillman Batchellor
- The Ranger Service in the Upper Valley of the Connecticut, and the Most Northerly Regiment of the New Hampshire Militia in the Period of the Revolution: An Address Delivered Before the New Hampshire Society of Sons of the American Revolution at Concord, N.H., April 26, 1900, by Albert Stillman Batchellor
