= Luther Tracy Townsend =

American theologian

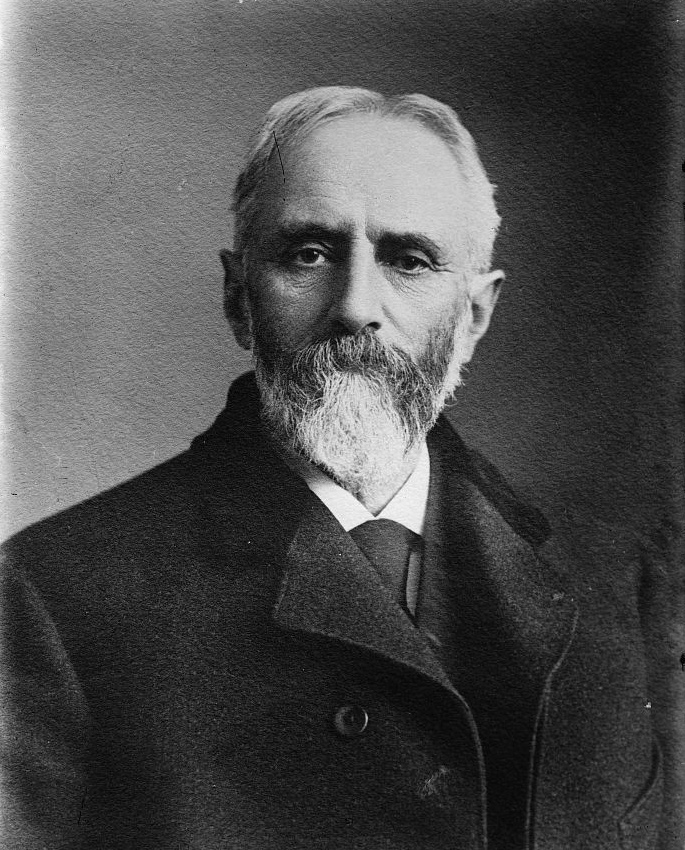
- Townsend c. 1915
- Born: September 27, 1838; Orono, Maine
- Died: 1922
- Education: Dartmouth College, Andover Theological Seminary
- Occupations: Minister, educator, and author

Reverend Luther Tracy Townsend (September 27, 1838 - 1922) was a Methodist minister and professor at Boston University, and the author of a number of theological and historical works. He was especially known for his opposition to Charles Darwin's theory of evolution.

== Biography ==
Luther Tracy Townsend was born on September 27, 1838, in Orono, Maine, to Luther K. Townsend and Mary True Call. His father died on November 16, 1839, and his mother took the family to New Hampshire. He started work at the Boston, Concord and Montreal Railroad in 1850. He infrequently attended the New Hampshire Conference Seminary, now known as the Tilton School. He graduated from Dartmouth College with an A.B. in 1859. He then attended Andover Theological Seminary and graduated in 1862. He enlisted as a private in the 16th New Hampshire Volunteer Infantry in 1862 during the American Civil War. He was ordained by the Methodist church, in 1864. On September 27, 1865, he married Laura C. Huckins, the daughter of David T. Huckins and Sarah F. White of Watertown, Massachusetts.

Townsend served as pastor of a Methodist church after the Civil War, until 1868 when he began teaching Biblical languages, church history, and theology at Boston Theological Seminary, later known as Boston University School of Theology. It was here he gained a reputation as a defender of traditional evangelical beliefs and a critic of Darwinism and evolution. Townsend resigned his position at Boston University in 1893 to focus on writing and lecturing, and was a delegate to the 1893 World's Parliament of Religions in Chicago. In addition to his writing, he served as a Methodist pastor in Baltimore and later in Washington, D. C.

As a Christian creationist, Townsend attacked evolution and defended a literalist interpretation of the first chapters of Genesis over scientific research in his books such as Evolution or Creation (1896), Adam and Eve (1904) and Collapse of Evolution (1905). In Collapse of Evolution, Townsend blamed evolutionary theory, among other things, for what he saw as the downward moral trend of society, and warned that if the theory was accepted it would lead to an increase in war, murder, and that the world would be "an asylum for an idiotic race and a mad house with padded cells without anyone to lock or unlock its doors." He was a member of the Victoria Institute, a creationist organization, and was one of the most well known clerical opponents of evolution at the time. Townsend was also a supporter of William Menzies Alexander's research on demonic possession.

== Publications ==
- Credo, and True and Pretended Christianity (1869)
- Sword and Garment (1871)
- God-Man (1872)
- Lost Forever, and Outlines of Theology (1873)
- Arena and Throne (1874)
- The Chinese Problem (1876)
- The Supernatural Factor in Revivals (1877)
- The Intermediate World (1878)
- Elements of General and Christian Theology (1879)
- Fate of Republics, and Studies in Poetry and Prose (1880)
- Art of Speech (2 volumes, 1880–1881)
- Studies in Eloquence and Logic and Mosaic Record and Modern Science (1881)
- Bible Theology and Modern Thought (1883)
- Faith-Work, Christian Science and other Cures (1885)
- Hand-Book upon Church Trials, and the Bible and other Ancient Literature (1885)
- Pulpit and Rhetoric (1886)
- New Hampshire Volunteers (1896)
- History of the Sixteenth Regiment (1897)
- Story of Jonah in the Light of Higher Criticism (1897)
- Twelve discourses of the Credo series (1898)
- Evolution or Creation (1896)
- Anastasis (1900)
- Collapse of Evolution (1905)
- The Stars Not Inhabited: Scientific and Biblical Points of View (1914)
