= Worthy Patterson =

American basketball player (1931–2022)

Personal information
- Born: June 17, 1931 New Haven, Connecticut, U.S.
- Died: December 6, 2022 (aged 91) Santa Monica, California, U.S.
- Listed height: 6 ft 2 in (1.88 m)
- Listed weight: 175 lb (79 kg)

Career information
- High school: Greenwich (Greenwich, Connecticut); Tilton School (Tilton, New Hampshire)
- College: UConn (1951–1954)
- NBA draft: 1954: undrafted
- Playing career: 1957–1960
- Position: Guard
- Number: 17

Career history
- 1957–1958: St. Louis Hawks
- 1958–1960: Scranton Miners

Career highlights
- 2× All-Yankee Conference (1953, 1954)

Career NBA statistics
- Points: 7 (1.8 ppg)
- Rebounds: 2 (0.5 rpg)
- Assists: 2 (0.5 rpg)
- Stats at NBA.com
- Stats at Basketball Reference

Worthington R. Patterson Jr. (June 17, 1931 – December 6, 2022) was an American basketball player who played college basketball for the UConn Huskies team and the St. Louis Hawks of the National Basketball Association (NBA), becoming the first UConn alumnus to play in an NBA game. After his basketball career, Patterson worked as a music executive.

== Early life ==
Worthington R. Patterson was born on June 17, 1931, in New Haven, Connecticut. He was introduced to basketball at the Boys Club in Greenwich, Connecticut. He attended Greenwich High School from 1946 to 1950 and then spent one year at The Tilton School, where he played for Coach Weldon Haire.

== College career ==
Patterson played guard for the UConn Huskies from 1951 to 1954. During that time he was named first team All-Yankee Conference twice (1952–53 and 1953–54) and helped lead the team to three consecutive Yankee Conference Championships and an appearance in the 1954 NCAA Men's Division I Basketball Tournament. He played for coach Hugh Greer. Patterson would become the first UConn alumnus to play in an NBA game.

== Professional career ==
Patterson dropped out of college a semester before graduation in order to sign with the Boston Celtics, shortly before the start of training camp in 1954. He was waived by the team two days before the start of the regular season. After he was cut, Patterson returned to UConn and earned his bachelor's degree in physical education.

After graduating, Patterson, who was a member of the Reserve Officers' Training Corps in college, enlisted in the United States Army. He served two years in the Army and was stationed at Fort Sill. While at Fort Sill, he was an officer and played on the base basketball team.

In 1957, Patterson returned to professional basketball as a member of the St. Louis Hawks. He was the only African-American player in camp that year. His first NBA game, against the Celtics, took place on October 22, 1957. He was released after three months with the team, during which time he played in 4 games, scoring 7 points in 13 minutes of play. The Hawks became the last team to win the season without an African American player on its playoff roster.

After his release, Patterson worked in the Hawks' front office for 4–6 weeks as part of the team's effort to integrate. He spent the 1958–59 and 1959–60 seasons with the Scranton Miners of the Eastern Basketball Association.

== Music executive ==
After retiring from basketball, Patterson worked as a salesman. He spent six years at Technical Tape Corporation, working as a sales trainee, assistant to the Vice President of Sales, assistant to the General Manager, and assistant to the Purchasing Agent.

Patterson left Technical Tape Corporation for RCA, where he worked at an RCA Records factory before becoming a salesman in the New England territory. He was later transferred to the company's promotions office in New York City. He then spent five years with Warner Bros. Records.

In 1969, he was appointed manager of artist relations east at Dot Records.

In 1970, he returned to RCA as head of promotions. Among the acts at RCA at this time were Hall & Oates, Waylon Jennings, and Vickie Sue Robinson.

Later that year, he moved to Chess Records, where he was named national promotions director. In 1971, Patterson was promoted to Sales Director.

In 1972, Patterson became Eastern district sales manager for Warner/Reprise Records. In 1973, he joined Warner Brothers’ subsidiary Casablanca Records, where he was charge of promotions for the new label. Casablanca's acts included Kiss, Donna Summer, The Village People, and Toni Tennille.

Patterson later moved to Motown, where he worked for eight years in sales and promotions.

Patterson worked at Bertelsmann Music Group for eight months in 1991 before retiring.

Patterson came out of retirement in the mid-1990s to serve as vice president of marketing and promotion for Monad Records.

== Personal life and death ==
Patterson and his wife Queen had two children, Worthy III and Tanya. Worthy III played basketball at Pepperdine University.

Patterson died in Santa Monica, California on December 6, 2022, at the age of 91.

== Career statistics ==
Legend
GP	Games played	GS	Games started	MPG	Minutes per game
FG%	Field goal percentage	3P%	3-point field goal percentage	FT%	Free throw percentage
RPG	Rebounds per game	APG	Assists per game	SPG	Steals per game
BPG	Blocks per game	PPG	Points per game	**Bold**	Career high

=== NBA ===
==== Regular season ====
Year	Team	GP	MPG	FG%	FT%	RPG	APG	PPG
1957–58	St. Louis	4	3.3	.375	.500	.5	.5	1.8
