= Irene Clark Durrell =

American educator

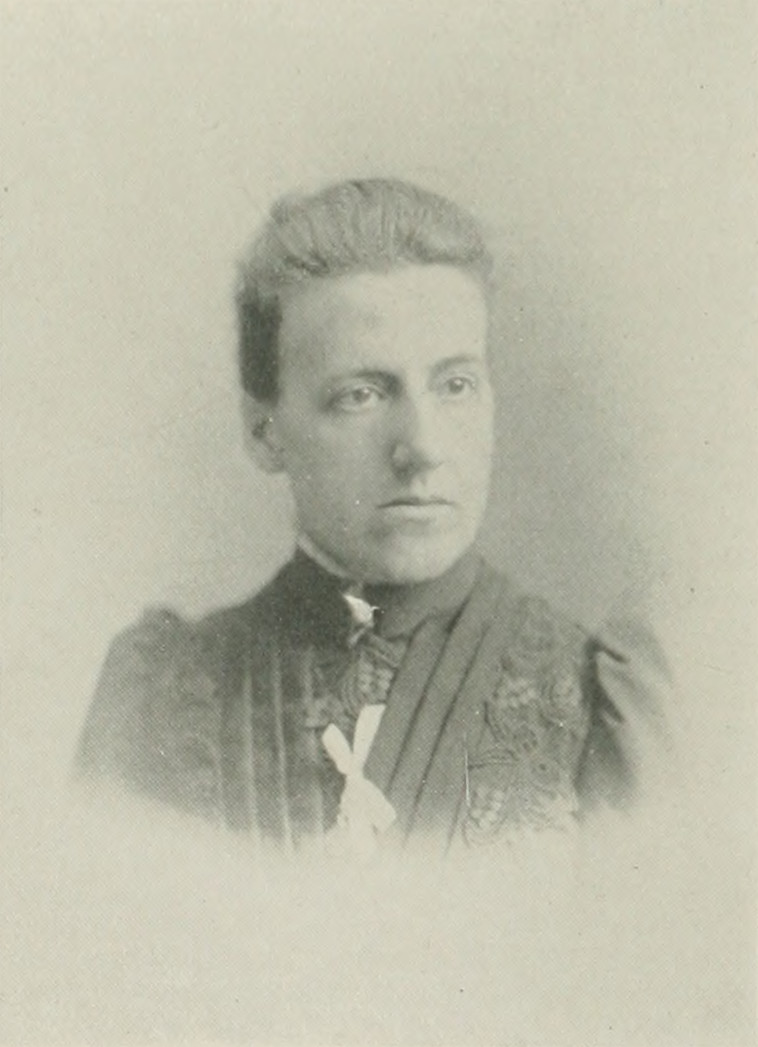
Irene Sarah Clark Durrell

Irene Sarah Clark Durrell (17 May 1852 – 9 November 1914) was an American educator from New Hampshire. She served as preceptress of the New Hampshire Conference Seminary and Female College, now known as Tilton School.

== Early years and education ==
Irene Sarah Clark was born in Plymouth, New Hampshire, 17 May 1852. Her father was Hiram Clark. Until the age of 12, her education occurred at ungraded country schools. She was a pupil for a time in the village grammar school and in the Plymouth Academy. Taking private lessons of her pastor in Latin and sciences, and studying by herself, she prepared to enter the State Normal School in Plymouth (now Plymouth State University), where she completed the first course in 1872 and the second in 1873, teaching during summer vacations.

== Career ==
In 1873 and 1874, she taught grammar school in West Lebanon, New Hampshire, In the fall of 1874, she became the teacher of the normal department in the New Hampshire Conference Seminary and Female College (now Tilton School), and a student in the junior year in the classical course. She was graduated in 1876. She then taught in the State Normal School (now Castleton University) in Castleton, Vermont.

On 23 July 1878 she married Rev. Jesse Murton Durrell, D.D. She served as an officer and organizer in the Woman's Foreign Missionary Society. For four years, she was district secretary and was a delegate from the New England branch to the Evanston general executive committee meeting. With her husband, in 1882, she took an extended tour abroad. In the spring of 1891, her husband became president of the New Hampshire Conference Seminary and Female College, Durrell became the preceptress of that institution. She died 9 November 1914.
