= Harriette Cooke =

American academic (1829–1914)

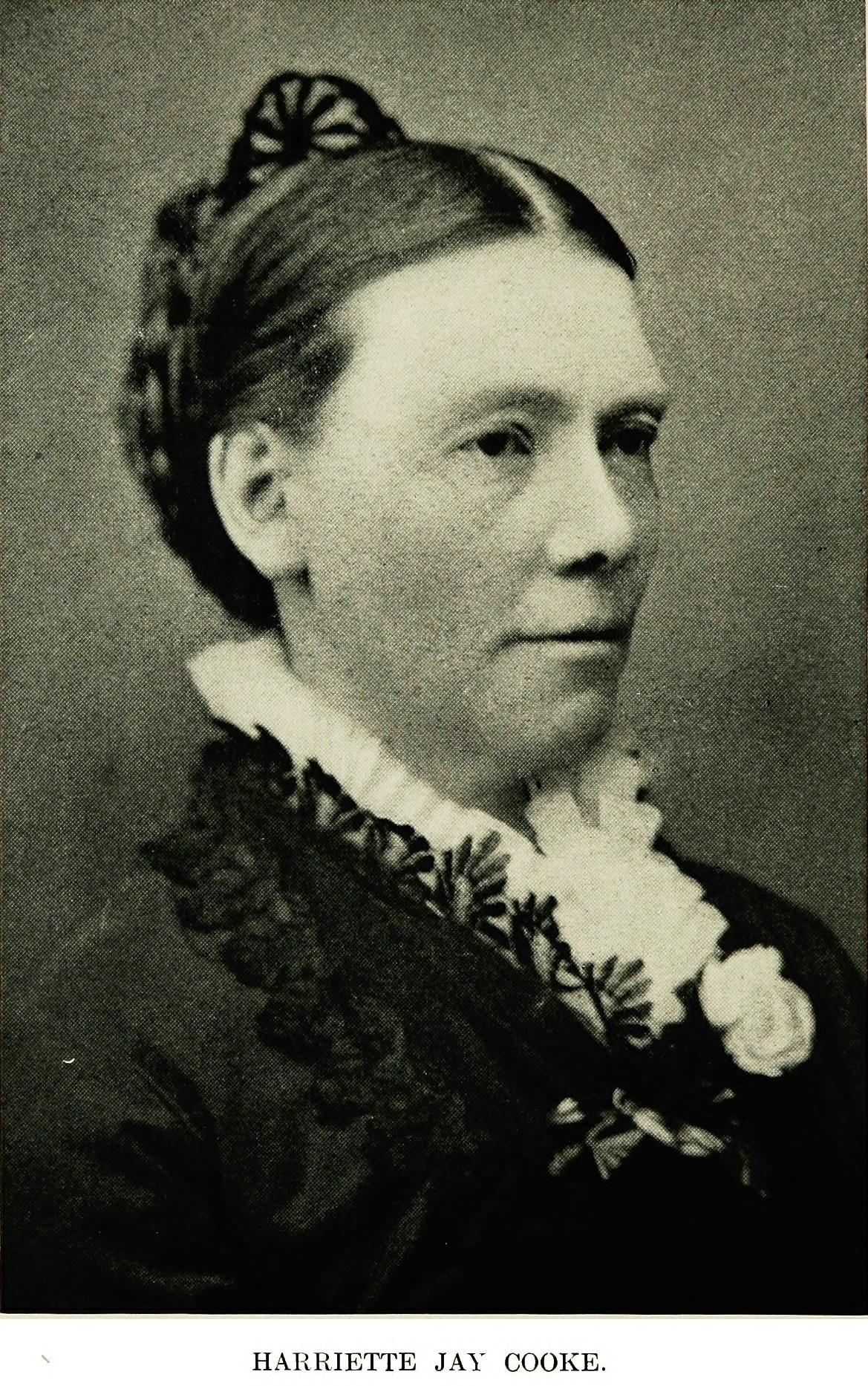
- Portrait of Cooke circa 1875
- Born: Harriette Jay Cooke; December 1, 1829; Sandwich, New Hampshire, United States
- Died: July 27, 1914 (aged 84); Stoneham, Massachusetts, United States
- Education: Tilton School
- Occupations: Educator, deaconess
- Employer: Cornell College

Harriette Jay Cooke (December 1, 1829 – July 27, 1914) was an American professor and women's rights pioneer. She was the first known female professor in the United States to have the same salary as an equally-ranked man. Harriette Cooke was promoted to full professorship in 1871. She remained a professor until her resignation from Cornell College in 1890. After resigning from Cornell, Cooke studied and worked as a deaconess. She later became superintendent of a settlement house in Boston, where she also provided medical aid to the poor. Cooke was praised by her fellow professors, and the 1904 Cornell College Record named her as the Mary Lyon of Iowa.

== Career ==
After graduating from the New Hampshire Conference Seminary, now Tilton School, in 1853, Cooke taught in Massachusetts for several years. She became a teacher at Cornell College in Mount Vernon, Iowa, in November 1857 which was the college's first year of being open. She became the dean of woman in 1860, and she was also the college preceptress. In 1871, Cooke became a full professor of German and history. As a full professor, Cooke earned the same salary as the college's male professors and was the first American woman professor to receive that wage.

Cooke advocated for a woman's gymnastic group for Cornell College in 1873. Women wanted to have the same compulsory military training that men had to undergo beginning in 1873. Cooke started the Cornell's Ladies Battalion in 1889, and the women held drills in skirted uniforms while using wooden wands in the place of rifles. To raise money for a new boarding hall, Cooke held lectures around Iowa for a decade. In 1885, the boarding hall, known as Bowman Hall, was built. She stopped teaching German in 1886 but continued to teach history along with government science.

After resigning from Cornell College in 1890, Cooke traveled to England. During this time, Cooke was researching history at University College London. After studying deaconess work in England, she wrote a book about the work and then returned to the United States as one of the deaconess leaders. After her return to the United States, Cooke was the superintendent of a settlement house in Boston. She provided medical aid to the poor as well.

== Personal life and death ==
Cooke was born in Sandwich, New Hampshire, on December 1, 1829, to Josiah and Jane (Cox) Cooke. She studied in the schools, seminaries, and private instructions that were open to women at the time. While she was studying, colleges were unavailable for women to attend.

When women's rights suffragist Elizabeth Cady Stanton visited Mount Vernon, Cooke was invited to dine with her. In 1882, Cooke and Mary Fancher Williams started the first woman's book club in Mount Vernon called the Ingleside Club. On her 80th birthday, Cooke was given hundreds of letters from her former students at Cornell College, and she responded to each letter.

Cooke died on July 27, 1914, at the age of 84.

== Recognition ==
In 1905, a portrait of Cooke was placed in an alcove of the college's library. The portrait was taken in 1875.

William Fletcher King, the Cornell College president from 1863 to 1908, wrote that Cook "had a commanding presence and excellent health. She was an energetic worker and a strong teacher. She had unusual ability in mastering subjects and in presenting them forcibly. She was resourceful, strong of will, and magnetic in character."

Cornell College Professor S. N. Fellows said of Cooke, "In regard to the employment of lady professors it has been claimed that colleges of other States were in advance of those of Iowa. This is doubtless a mistake. A careful investigation made a few years ago revealed to me that Iowa was not behind in this respect — that at least two other colleges of Iowa elected lady professors before it was done at Cornell, but did not give to them salaries equal to those paid to the gentlemen."

The 1904 record of Cornell College praised Cooke for helping those who were young, suffering, and poor. The record also named her as the Mary Lyon of Iowa.

The 1911 book History of Linn County, Iowa stated that Cooke "exerted a more potent influence on the institution than any of her colleagues for the first decade".
