= Tilton School =

Prep school in Tilton, New Hampshire, US

Location
- 30 School Street; Tilton, New Hampshire; United States; 43°26′40″N 71°35′23″W

Information
- Type: Private, coeducational, secondary boarding and day school
- Motto: Quanti Est Sapere - How Valuable is Wisdom
- Established: 1845; 181 years ago
- Head of School: Derek, Krein
- Teaching staff: 27.1 (on an FTE basis)
- Grades: 9–12 and Post Grad
- Gender: Coeducational
- Enrollment: 197 (2021–22)
- Student to teacher ratio: 7.3
- Campus: Small town
- Student Union/Association: BSU
- Colors: Black and gold
- Athletics: NEPSAC; Lakes Region League
- Team name: Rams
- Rival: New Hampton School
- Accreditation: NEASC
- Newspaper: The Tiltonian
- Yearbook: Tilton Tower
- Affiliation: NAIS, TABS, ISANNE
- Website: www.tiltonschool.org

Tilton School is an independent, coeducational, college-preparatory school in Tilton, New Hampshire, serving students from 9th to 12th grade and postgraduate students. Founded in 1845, Tilton's student body in the 2021–22 academic year consisted of 61 day students and 129 boarding students. The typical student enrollment includes representation from 15 to 20 states and 10-15 countries.

== History ==
Tilton School, a boarding school in New Hampshire, was founded in 1845 by a group of local leaders and members of the Methodist Episcopal Church. Their goal was to promote literary and scientific knowledge among the youth.

The school was originally named the New Hampshire Conference Seminary of the Methodist Episcopal Church and was located in the town of Northfield. In the first year of the school, the seminary's enrollment consisted of 130 students, (74 males, 56 females). Most students were from neighboring towns, but some traveled from as far as Vermont and Boston to attend the new Methodist school. After a number of setbacks, including a fire that destroyed the first school building, the school moved across the Winnipesaukee River to its current location in Tilton.

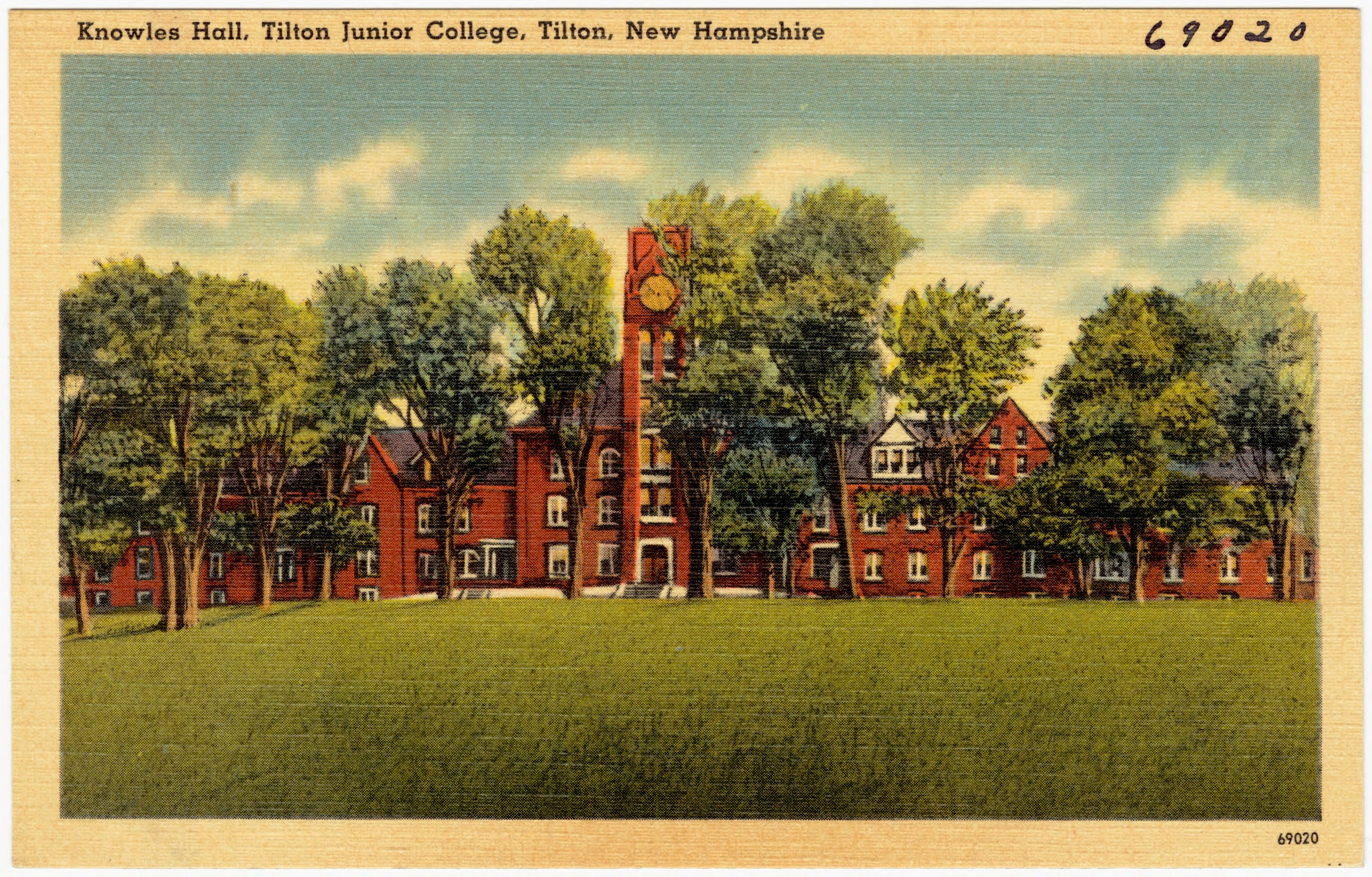
Knowles Hall, Tilton Junior College

Like many town academies in New England, Tilton School was a coeducational college preparatory boarding school with students from all over the world. It also served as the public high school for the towns of Northfield, Tilton and Sanbornton until 1939. During this time, students were able to choose a college preparatory or a general course of study. In addition to granting high school degrees, Tilton School awarded a number of other degrees, including college diplomas when the seminary included a women's college from 1852 to 1903. Tilton School also functioned as a junior college which awarded men their associate degree from 1936 until 1958. Tilton School had a lower and a middle school at different times in its early history.

The biggest change in the school's history occurred in 1939: a local school district formed, and Tilton School no longer served as the towns' high school. Tilton also stopped accepting female students at this time. Tilton School was then an all-boys preparatory boarding school until 1970. During this period, the school underwent major changes, including the addition of a new gymnasium, library, chapel, dormitory, and the purchase of 49 acres (20 ha) of land adjacent to campus.

Tilton School's return to its coeducational roots in 1970 led to more changes. In subsequent years, two girls' dorms (Moore Hall and Maloney Hall) were built, and more academic and athletic facilities were added to campus.

In 2013, Chris Burch, Class of 1972, announced at an all-school meeting that he would be donating $1.3 million for the construction of an artificial turf field on the Hill. This gift is the largest single donation in the school's history. Before the construction of Burch Field, all outdoor sports competitions were held at the Charles E. Tilton fields in Northfield. The construction of Burch Field was completed in 2014 and dedicated on October 4 of that year. It is the first playing field contiguous to campus and the first in a series of campus developments known as "The Burch Initiative".

In late 2023, the school announced that the 28th and first woman head of school - Kate Saunders - would be stepping down from the role. She is known for leading the school through COVID-19, the Charles E. Tilton Mansion restoration, and the Knowles Hall renovation. In January 2024, the school announced that Derek Krein would be succeeding her as the 29th Head of School.

== Academics ==
At Tilton classes are held Monday through Friday; the afternoons are reserved for athletics and club activities. Tilton has a student-to-teacher ratio of 5:1 and an average class size of 11 students.

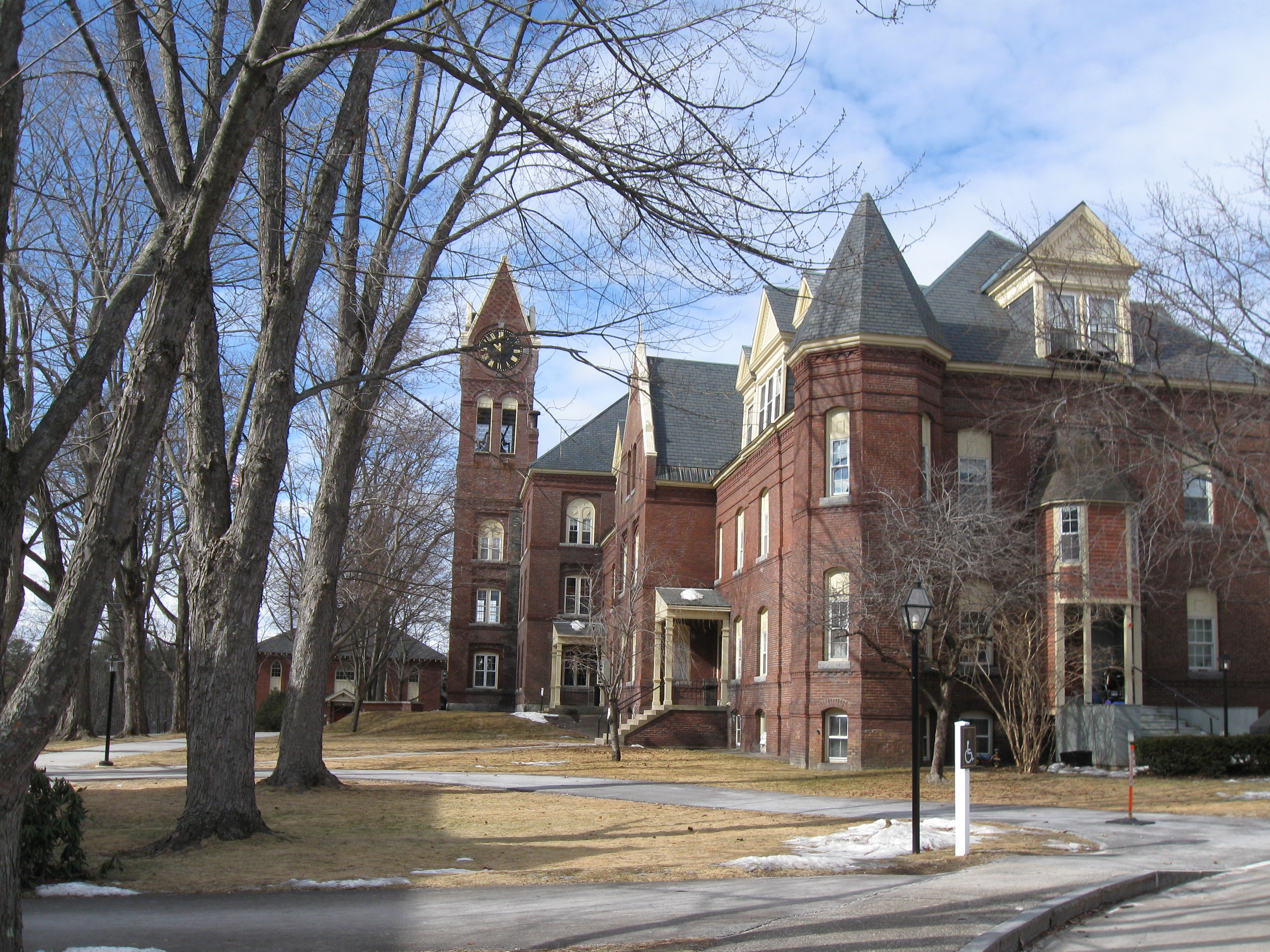
Tilton School, Knowles Hall

Tilton maintains an active chapter of the Cum Laude Society. The school also inducts a small group of highly ambitious students into the National Honor Society every year. Academic accolades, character prizes, and book awards are distributed annually at the end of the school year during Prize Night.

== Athletics ==
Tilton's athletic program requires students to participate in intramural or interscholastic athletic programs. The school offers 16 interscholastic sports with teams at the varsity and junior varsity level as well as intramural sports squads and opportunities for independent study.

=== Opponents ===
Tilton School competes in the Lakes Region League, which consists of seven boarding schools in New England that compete athletically and academically. Tilton is also a member of the New England Preparatory School Athletic Council (NEPSAC).

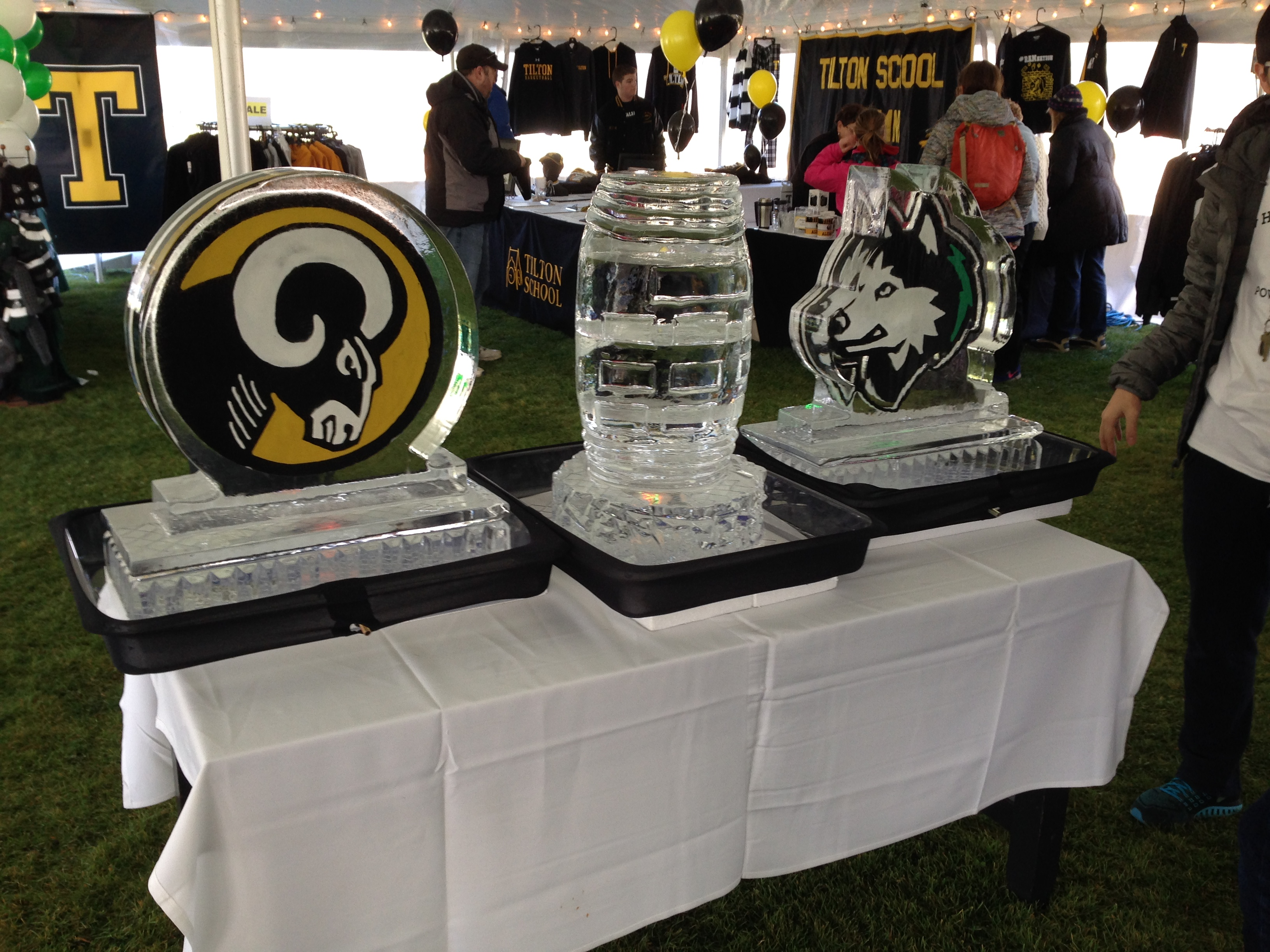
Annual Powder Keg rivalry between Tilton and New Hampton

In 2008 Tilton and New Hampton School resumed a long-standing rivalry known as the Powder Keg. The competition between the two schools dates back to 1895 and is among the oldest rivalries in prep school athletics. The Rams last win came in 2011. Other traditional athletic opponents include Phillips Exeter Academy, St. Paul's School, St. Mark's School, Kents Hill School, Cushing Academy, and other prep and boarding schools from across the northeast.

=== Championships ===
Since 2010, the girls' varsity basketball team has won four Class B NEPSAC championships, most recently in 2016 and 2017. The girls' varsity basketball team has also won the Lakes Region League Championship every year since 2010. In 2009, the boys' varsity basketball team won the National Prep Championship, and more recently, NEPSAC championships in 2015 and 2018. In 2008 and 2014, the boys' varsity soccer team won NEPSAC championships, and in 2007, the varsity football team went undefeated (9–0) and won a NEPSAC championship. The boys' varsity baseball team won back-to-back Lakes Region championships in 2014 and 2015. Girls' varsity softball most recently won the Lakes Region Championship in 2014.

== School life ==
Students may participate in intramural sports, including club hockey, basketball, squash, dodgeball, skiing, rock climbing, hiking, and dance. Clubs offered include ceramics, studio art, newspaper (The Tiltonian), photography, community service, outdoor program, yearbook (Tilton Tower), graphic design, Tilton Activity Board (TAB), student government, Parnassus (Tilton School's literary and art magazine), health and wellness, and peer counseling. The Tilton theater group performs three shows a year (fall, winter, and spring) in Hamilton Hall, and typically the winter performance is a musical.

=== Community service ===
Over 4,300 hours of community service are completed yearly at Tilton School through its community service program. Tilton students often work closely with the New Hampshire Veterans Home in Tilton, as it is near the campus. Every April, there is an All School Community Service Day in which advisory groups spend their day in the local community helping local residents and businesses complete their spring cleaning. Each year, a group of students travel to the Dominican Republic on their spring break in March to work with the Batey Foundation and help build community centers in impoverished areas.

== Campus ==
Tilton School sits on 146 acres (0.6 km^{2}) on a hill overlooking the village of Tilton. The campus comprises more than 15 buildings, including five residential dormitories, a multi-purpose athletics center, an indoor ice hockey arena, several academic buildings, a school chapel, library, and visual arts center.

Skinner Tower, constructed in 2007 and designed by Scott Simons Architects, is located just west of Plimpton Hall and connects to that building. Skinner Tower was named after Carlton Skinner, the first civilian governor of Guam and one of Tilton's most distinguished alumni. It is a 38,000-square-foot (3,500 m^{2}), wireless building that is four stories high. The atrium of the tower is used as a common space for students during free periods, as an art gallery, and sometimes as a dance floor for school socials. Skinner Tower is home to the Davis Lecture Hall, a 100-seat, SAT-certified lecture hall which is used as a classroom and venue for speakers and presentations. The first floor comprises a biology laboratory (complete with two-story greenhouse), a chemistry laboratory, and the 9th grade FIRST Program seminar room with a connecting outdoor classroom space. The second floor houses the physics laboratory, math classrooms, and integrated math/science faculty work spaces, which enhance cross-discipline collaboration, as well as the Head of School and Assistant Head of School offices. The third floor has the world languages classrooms and language laboratory and resource rooms, as well as the Center for Academic Achievement, which encompasses 10 one-on-one tutorial rooms, computer lab and common space.

Maloney Hall, also constructed in 2007, occupies 15,000 square feet (1,400 m^{2}) and houses 20 senior girls, as well as three faculty apartments. There is a recreation room and two-story common room with a fireplace and a kitchenette, as well as laundry and storage facilities. Double rooms all share a bathroom, and proctors' rooms have a private bathroom, the top-floor private bathroom with a skylight as well. The new dormitory marks a shift in housing toward smaller, family-style living.

Knowles Hall is the oldest building and the center of Tilton's campus for over 120 years. It houses over half of the student body. The East side of Knowles houses junior boys, the West side of Knowles houses freshman and sophomore girls, and the entire 1st floor of Knowles houses sophomore boys. Knowles Lobby is a popular hangout spot for students and is also occasionally the venue of student socials.

Beaumont Hall has two functions. The upper floors of Beaumont Dormitory are the main residential rooms for 9th-grade boys. The ground floor houses the school's main dining room. Beaumont is attached to Knowles Hall. It was built in 1909, when the current dining room replaced a smaller, wooden structure.

Tilton Hall was originally built by Charles E. Tilton in 1861. Tilton School purchased the building 101 years later. Tilton Hall, or "the Mansion", currently houses the Lucian Hunt Library. In 1980, the attached carriage house was renovated to house the Helene Grant Daly Art Center. It is listed on the National Register of Historic Places.

George L. Plimpton Hall, built in 1926, houses the majority of Tilton's classrooms, the Admission Office, and the administrative offices, including Tilton's College Counseling Center. Plimpton Hall is also home to Tilton's Innovation Lab, which includes a 3D printer.

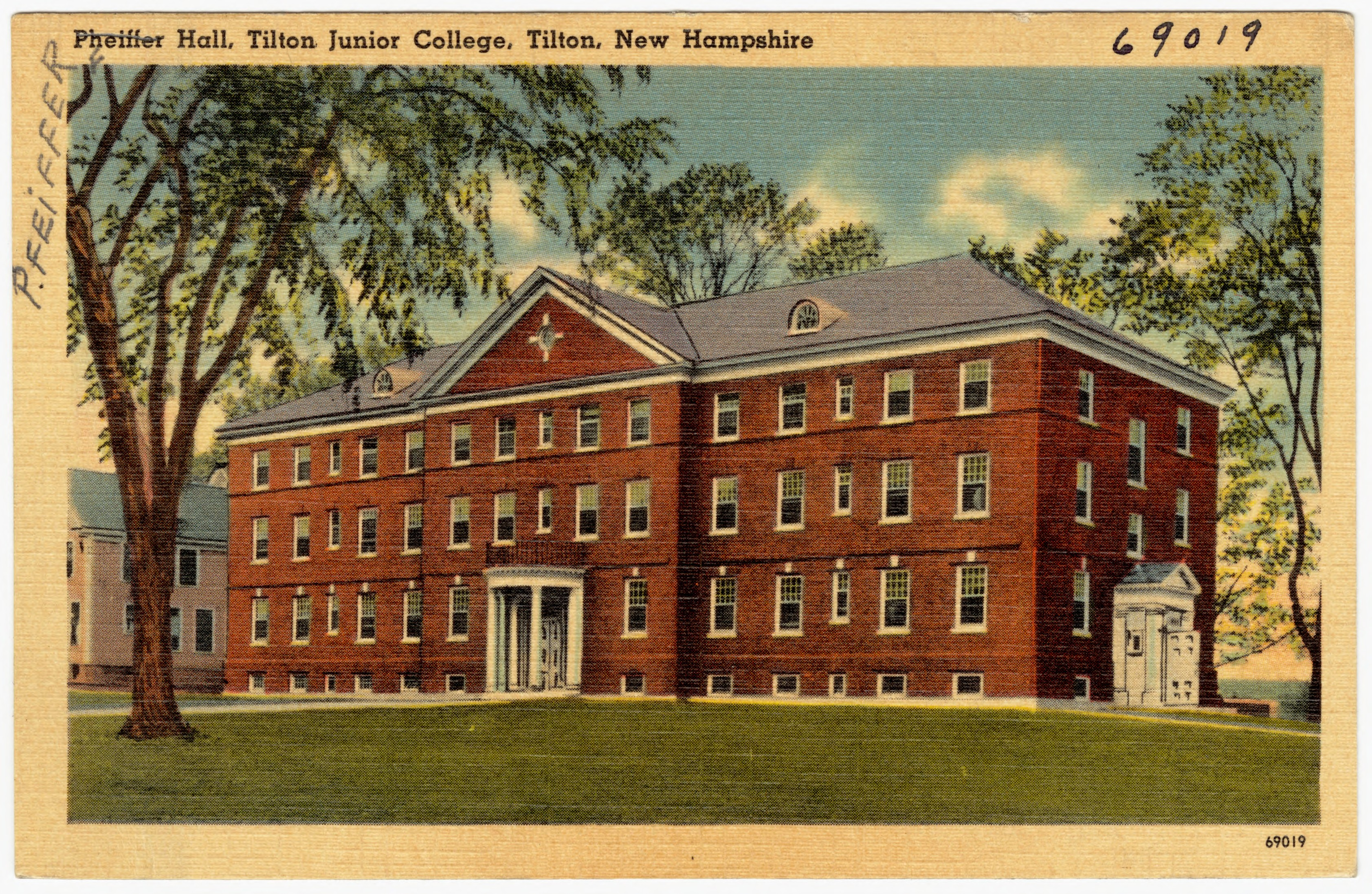
Pfeiffer Hall houses senior and post-graduate boys.

Pfeiffer Hall, constructed in 1938 and 1939, presently serves as a dormitory for 12th-grade boys.

Moore Hall, constructed in 1988, serves as a dormitory for 11th grade and post-graduate girls.

Hamilton Hall is home to Tilton's theater and music departments, and was originally the school's gymnasium and recreation center before the Memorial Athletic and Recreational Center was built.

The Fred Andrew Smart Chapel was transported in 1965 to Tilton's campus from its original home in Canterbury, New Hampshire. The building serves as a school meeting place and is often a gallery for student art.

Burch Field, completed in October 2014, serves as a multi-purpose sports facility. This artificial turf field is used by Field Hockey, Women's Soccer, Football, Women's and Men's Lacrosse, and occasionally Men's Soccer. The facility includes bleachers, a press box, and lighting for contests that take place at night. Construction began when alumnus J. Christopher Burch ('72) made the largest single donation in the school's history in the spring of 2013.

The Memorial Gymnasium was built shortly after World War II to honor Tilton students who had served and died for their country. In 1998, the building was completely renovated and rededicated as the Memorial Athletic and Recreational Center (MARC). In the building is a memorial honoring Tilton students who have died in battle, dating back to the Civil War era. The memorial also displays Stephen Holden Doane's ('66) Medal of Honor, which was given to the school by his family. The building contains two basketball courts, a climbing wall, a weight room, six locker rooms, a training room, and a student center including a snack bar called Rusty's Den. A 2008 addition has extended the social area of the MARC, adding more couches, a larger television set, a pool table, and a foosball table. The previous wrestling room moved to the second story of the MARC.

The John F. MacMorran Field House, originally built in 1978, provided Tilton with its first indoor hockey arena. In 1999, Tilton completed a $2 million renovation of the facility.

== Notable alumni ==
- Alfred Aboya, Cameroonian basketball player, UCLA
- Henry Moore Baker, congressman from New Hampshire
- Albert Batchellor, lawyer, NH politician
- J. Christopher Burch, Class of 1972, founder and CEO of Burch Creative Capital
- Harriette Cooke, first woman to be granted full professorship at a college with a salary equal to that of a man
- Richard Cramm, lawyer
- John Charles Daly, host of the game show What's My Line?, reporter and news executive
- Dustin Allard Degree, Vermont politician
- Stephen Holden Doane (1947–1969), Class of 1966, Medal of Honor recipient
- James F. Duffy, University of Detroit football coach
- E. Maude Ferguson, first woman elected to the New Hampshire Senate
- Sam Walter Foss, American poet
- John W. Gowdy, Methodist bishop
- Brett Hanson, college basketball player
- Harry Burns Hutchins, fourth president of the University of Michigan
- Frederic Lawrence Knowles, poet
- Terance Mann, basketball player for the Atlanta Hawks
- Bobby Murray, professional baseball player
- Donald M. Murray, Pulitzer Prize-winning journalist, columnist for The Boston Globe and professor emeritus of English at the University of New Hampshire
- John Morton, biathlon skier, seven-time Olympian
- Georges Niang, basketball player for the Atlanta Hawks
- Nerlens Noel, Class of 2012, basketball player for the New York Knicks
- Alex Oriakhi, basketball player, University of Connecticut
- Worthy Patterson, National Basketball Association player
- Harl Pease (1917–1942), Medal of Honor recipient and namesake of Pease Air Force Base
- John Perkins, Class of 1963, author of Confessions of an Economic Hit Man (Berrett-Koehler, 2004)
- Fanny Huntington Runnells Poole (1863–1940), writer, book reviewer
- Eben Ezra Roberts, architect
- Ross Scaife, professor of classics at the University of Kentucky
- E. O. Schwagerl, Bavarian-American landscape architect, designed Seattle's park system
- Wayne Selden Jr., professional basketball player in the Israeli Basketball Premier League
- Carlton Skinner, first civilian governor of Guam
- Milford K. Smith, Associate Justice of the Vermont Supreme Court
- Charles H. Tenney, hat dealer
- Jack Tilton (1951–2017), American art dealer
- Lydia H. Tilton, educator, activist, journalist, poet, lyricist
- Luther Tracy Townsend, theologian and professor at Boston University
- M. Emmet Walsh, character actor
- Henry Gordon Wells, politician, president of the Massachusetts Senate
- Marcus Zegarowski, professional basketball player

== Notable faculty ==
- Irene Clark Durrell, preceptress
- Mary Baker Eddy, founder of Christian Science (substitute teacher)
- John W. Gowdy, bishop of the Methodist Episcopal Church and The Methodist Church (teacher)
- Weldon Haire, public address announcer (basketball coach)
- Mary Elizabeth Perley (1863–?), educator and author
- Richard S. Rust, Methodist preacher (Head of School)
- Mike Walsh, ice hockey player (ice hockey coach)
