= Stephen Holden Doane =

United States Army Medal of Honor recipient

- Doane's grave at Arlington National Cemetery
- Born: October 13, 1947; Beverly, Massachusetts, US
- Died: March 25, 1969 (aged 21); Hậu Nghĩa Province, Republic of Vietnam
- Burial place: Arlington National Cemetery, Arlington, Virginia
- Military career
- Allegiance: United States of America
- Branch: United States Army
- Service years: 1967–1969
- Rank: First Lieutenant
- Units: Company B, 1st Battalion, 5th Infantry Regiment, 25th Infantry Division
- Conflicts: Vietnam War: Operation Toan Thang III †
- Awards: Medal of Honor; Silver Star; Bronze Star

Stephen Holden Doane (October 13, 1947 – March 25, 1969) was a United States Army officer and a recipient of the United States military's highest decoration—the Medal of Honor—for his actions in the Vietnam War.

== Biography ==
Doane attended and graduated from Walton Central High School, in Walton New York in 1965. Doane joined the Army from Albany, New York in 1967, and went through Officer Candidate School at Fort Benning. By March 25, 1969, he was serving as a first lieutenant in Company B, 1st Battalion, 5th Infantry Regiment, 25th Infantry Division. During a firefight on that day, in Hau Nghia Province, Republic of Vietnam, during Operation Toan Thang III Doane destroyed an enemy bunker by carrying an activated hand grenade

== Medal of Honor citation ==
First Lieutenant Doane's official Medal of Honor citation reads:

For conspicuous gallantry and intrepidity in action at the risk of his life above and beyond the call of duty. First Lt. Doane was serving as a platoon leader when his company, engaged in a tactical operation, abruptly contacted an enemy force concealed in protected bunkers and trenches. Three of the leading soldiers were pinned down by enemy crossfire. One was seriously wounded. After efforts of 1 platoon to rescue these men had failed, it became obvious that only a small group could successfully move close enough to destroy the enemy position and rescue or relieve the trapped soldiers, 1st Lt. Doane, although fully aware of the danger of such an action, crawled to the nearest enemy bunker and silenced it. He was wounded but continued to advance to a second enemy bunker. As he prepared to throw a grenade, he was again wounded. Undaunted, he deliberately pulled the pin on the grenade and lunged with it into the enemy bunker, destroying this final obstacle. 1st Lt. Doane's supreme act enabled his company to rescue the trapped men without further casualties. The extraordinary courage and selflessness displayed by this officer were an inspiration to his men and are in the highest traditions of the U.S. Army.

== See also ==
- List of Medal of Honor recipients for the Vietnam War
