= Frederick Knowles (footballer) =

English footballer

Personal information
- Full name: Frederick Edmund Knowles
- Date of birth: 21 July 1901
- Place of birth: Derby, England
- Date of death: 1991 (aged 89–90)
- Position: Centre forward

Senior career*
| Years | Team | Apps | (Gls) |
| 1920–1921 | Derby YMCA | | |
| 1921–1922 | Derby County | 3 | (1) |
| Total | | 3 | (1) |
- * Club domestic league appearances and goals

Frederick Edmund Knowles (21 July 1901 – 1991) was an English footballer who played in the Football League for Derby County.
