= Frederic Lawrence Knowles =

American poet

- Born: September 8, 1869; Lawrence, Massachusetts
- Died: September 20, 1905 (aged 36)
- Education: Tilton School; Wesleyan University; Harvard University
- Writing career
- Notable works: On Life's Stairway, Love Triumphant

Frederic Lawrence Knowles was an American poet whose works included On Life's Stairway and Love Triumphant.

== Life ==
Knowles was born in Lawrence, Massachusetts, the son of Reverend Daniel C. Knowles, a Methodist minister, and Lucia M. (née Barrows) Knowles. He graduated from Tilton Seminary, now Tilton School, in 1890 and went on to attend Wesleyan University. At Wesleyan, he was an editor for the Wesleyan Literary Monthly and was elected to Phi Beta Kappa. He was also a member of the Psi Upsilon fraternity. He graduated from Wesleyan in 1894. In 1896, he graduated from Harvard University with an AB. After leaving Harvard, he taught at his alma mater, Tilton Seminary, where his father was Head of School, for a few years before becoming a manuscript reader for Houghton, Mifflin, & Co.

Knowles died on September 20, 1905, in Roxbury from typhoid fever.

== Works ==
- On Life's Stairway (1900)
