= John Morton (skier) =

American biathlete (born 1946)

Personal information
- Full name: John Michael Morton
- National team: United States of America
- Born: April 3, 1946 (age 79) Keene, New Hampshire, U.S.
- Education: Tilton School; Middlebury College
- Height: 5.83 ft 0 in (178 cm)
- Weight: 146 lb (66 kg; 10 st 6 lb)

Sport
- Sport: Biathlon
- Event(s): Men's 7.5-km Relay; Men's 20-km

John Morton (born April 3, 1946) is an Olympic skier and writer from the United States. He was born in Keene, New Hampshire. Morton has participated as an athlete, coach, and team leader in seven Olympic Games for the United States in the biathlon event.

== Early life ==
John Morton grew up in Walpole, New Hampshire. Morton graduated from Tilton School in 1964. At Tilton, he competed in four ski events: downhill, slalom, cross-country, and jumping. Morton was also a recipient of The John F. Thompson Memorial Award while at Tilton. He then attended Middlebury College where he competed on their cross-country skiing team. During his athletic college career he won the Eastern Intercollegiate Athletic Conference Championship in 1966 and 1968, and placed second at the 1968 NCAA Skiing Championships. Morton completed the Reserve Officers' Training Corps (ROTC) program at Middlebury and graduated in 1968. Morton was then to complete four years in the United States Army. In his first two years with the Army, Morton was assigned to Anchorage, Alaska, where he trained for the biathlon, combining his skiing talents and his military shooting training. In 1970, Morton was given orders to work as an advisor for the Military Assistance Command Vietnam, and was sent to South Vietnam for two years, deterring his biathlon training. He was released from active duty in 1972 with the rank of Captain.

== Olympics ==
Only having three months to train after being released from the Army, Morton made the U.S. Olympic team in 1972. Morton traveled with the team to Sapporo, Japan, but was benched for the entirety of the games because of personal conflict with his coach.

Morton competed at the 1976 Winter Olympics in Innsbruck, Austria, for the United States. Falling ill the night before the 20-km race, Morton was unable to compete, which put him at a disadvantage in placement for his second event of the games: the 7.5-km relay.

Morton has participated in five more Olympics for the U.S. Biathlon team as a coach or Team Leader. At the 2002 Winter Olympics in Salt Lake City, Morton worked as the Chief of Course for Biathlon events.

== Career ==
Morton was on the U.S. Biathlon Team starting in 1968 and ending in 1976. He won first place with the relay team at the 1976 North American Championships. He also raced on the U.S. Cross-Country Ski Team from 1973 to 1975. He won U.S. National Championships in 1974 and in 1976. Representing the United States, Morton competed at six Biathlon World Championships.

Between the 1972 Winter Olympics and the 1976 Winter Olympics, Morton worked as a high school teacher in Anchorage while training for the biathlon. He was the Dartmouth College head ski coach from 1978 to 1989. Morton has been a ski commentator for Vermont Public Radio since 1994.

Currently, Morton designs cross country skiing trails in Vermont with his company Morton Trails. His design work has taken him all over the world, designing different Nordic skiing trails for large-scale competitions, such as the World University Games and Biathlon World Cups, to local skiing trails, such as the Nordic trails at Proctor Academy.

Morton resides in Thetford, Vermont, with his wife, Kay. A competitive skier, Morton races in cross-country skiing events and is one of the top Masters athletes in the world for this discipline.

== Writing ==
Morton is considered a master on the biathlon event and has written books and journal articles concerning his experiences with the sport. He has been published in journals and magazines, including the Dartmouth Medical College magazine.

His other non-fiction works include Don't Look Back: Olympic Skiing Competitor and Coach Shares His Story and Training Program (1992) and A Medal of Honor: An Insider's Unveiling of the Agony and Ecstasy Surrounding the Olympic Dream (1998).

His most recent book, Celebrate Winter, originally published December 2020, revised January 2021, is a collection of stories, sharing insights and reflections of more than fifty-five years of competition and coaching.

== Legacy ==
Morton was inducted into the U.S. Biathlon Association Hall of Fame in 2008 for his commitment and contribution to the sport. In 2008, Morton was featured as an "Olympic Entrepreneur" in Forbes magazine for founding and running his trail design company, Morton Trails. In 2018, Morton was inducted in the Athletic Hall of Fame of his alma mater, Middlebury College.

In 2012, Morton gave the formal address at his alma mater, Tilton School, for their 168th Convocation. He is also a member of the Board of Trustees of Tilton School, and has been inducted into Tilton's Athletic Hall of Fame.
