= John W. Gowdy =

Scottish-American bishop

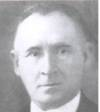
John Gowdy

John W. Gowdy (Chinese: 高智約翰; Pinyin: Gāozhì Yuēhàn; Foochow Romanized: Gŏ̤-dé Iók-hâng; 7 December 1869 – 1963) was a Scottish American bishop of the Methodist Episcopal Church and The Methodist Church, elected in 1930. He also distinguished himself as a missionary, an educator, and as a college and university president.

== Birth and family ==
John was born in Glasgow, Scotland, the son of Joseph and Margaret Jane (née Graham) Gowdy. John married Elizabeth Thompson 1 July 1902. His birth name may have been John Goudy but he changed it to Gowdy, possibly to aid pronunciation. Family members who remained in the UK look to have changed the spelling to Goudie.

== Education ==
John graduated in 1893 from the Tilton Seminary in Tilton, New Hampshire. He then earned the A.B. degree in 1897 from Wesleyan University, Middletown, Connecticut. He graduated from Drew Theological Seminary in 1902 with the B.D. degree. He then earned the M.A. degree in 1915 from Columbia University. Baker University awarded him the honorary degree D.D. in 1909. Wesleyan did as well in 1914. Rev. Gowdy was also a member of the honorary fraternity Psi Upsilon.

== Missionary and academic ministry ==
John Gowdy served as a teacher at the Tilton School in Tilton, New Hampshire, 1897–99. Following seminary graduation, he was ordained in the New Hampshire Annual Conference of the M.E. Church. He was appointed a Missionary Teacher at the Anglo-Chinese College in Fuzhou, China, serving in this position 1902–04. He also was a Class Leader in the Heavenly Rest Methodist Church in the Fuzhou Annual Conference. The Rev. Gowdy then became President of the Anglo-Chinese College in 1904, serving until 1923. He became President of the Fukien Christian University in 1923, serving there until 1927. He also served as a trustee of both the Anglo-Chinese College, of Union Normal School in Fuzhou, and of the Tilton School in New Hampshire. He also served on the Boards of Managers of both Anglo-Chinese and of Fukien.

== Episcopal ministry ==
John W. Gowdy was elected a bishop by the 1930 meeting of the China Central Conference of the Methodist Episcopal Church. He served as a bishop in this Central Conference until 1941. As a bishop, he was, of course, a participant in M.E. General Conferences in 1932 and 1936, the Uniting Conference of Methodism in 1939, and Methodist General Conferences in 1940 and 1944.

== Retirement ==
Bishop Gowdy retired in 1941. He made his retirement home at 378 Victoria Ave., Winter Park, Florida. He enjoyed history as a hobby and golf as a sport.

== See also ==
- List of bishops of the United Methodist Church
