= Andy Jick =

American sports announcer (1952–2019)

Andrew J. Jick (May 9, 1952 – May 3, 2019) was an American public address announcer for the Boston Celtics and the Boston College Eagles. He was the PA announcer for the Boston Celtics, an NBA men's basketball team, from 1980 to 1997, and the Boston College Eagles at Conte Forum from 2001 to 2019.

During tenure with the Celtics, Jick was the P.A. announcer during the NBA Finals five times (1981, 1984, 1985, 1986, and 1987). He was also the Celtics' final P.A. announcer at the Boston Garden and the first Celtics' announcer in FleetCenter. Before becoming the team's PA announcer, Jick worked for nine years for the team as a statistician and Wives' Room host.

After 2001, Jick was the public address announcer for the Boston College Eagles men's basketball team. He was the P.A. announcer during the 2003 NCAA Division I men's basketball tournament for first-round games played in the FleetCenter. He died in his sleep on May 3, 2019, at the age of 66.

Preceded by Weldon Haire	Boston Celtics Public Address Announcer; 1980–1997	Succeeded by Greg Dickerson
