= Frank Fallon =

Frank Fallon (March 20, 1896 – November 29, 1973, in Boston, Massachusetts) was a Boston sportscaster who served as a play-by-play announcer for the Boston Braves and was the public address announcer for the Boston Celtics, Boston Bruins and Boston Red Sox.

== Early life ==
A native of Boston, Fallon worked as a traveling salesman for the Brunswick-Balke-Collender Company in Rhode Island and Southeastern Massachusetts.

In 1932 he opened the Commonwealth Recreation Lanes, a bowling alley located in the Allston section of Boston. In July 1936 he moved to Kenmore Recreation when that alley opened.

== Career ==
Fallon began his career in 1938 at WMEX. He served as sports director and called Boston Braves games. In 1946, he broadcast the first major league night baseball game ever played in Boston. He later moved to WBOS.

From 1946 to 1949, Fallon was the public address announcer for the Boston Celtics. From 1957 until his death in 1973, he served as the Boston Bruins PA announcer. He also held this duty during Boston Red Sox games at Fenway Park.

From 1958 until the time of his death, Fallon was the publicity director of the Raynham Greyhound Park.
