= First Free Will Baptist Church =

First Free Will Baptist Church may refer to a building in the United States:

- First Free Will Baptist Church and Vestry, Ashland, New Hampshire
- First Freewill Baptist Church (East Alton, New Hampshire)
- First Free Will Baptist Church in Meredith, New Hampshire
- First Free Will Baptist Church (Ossipee, New Hampshire)
