= John W. Busiel House =

Historic house in New Hampshire, United States

- U.S. National Register of Historic Places
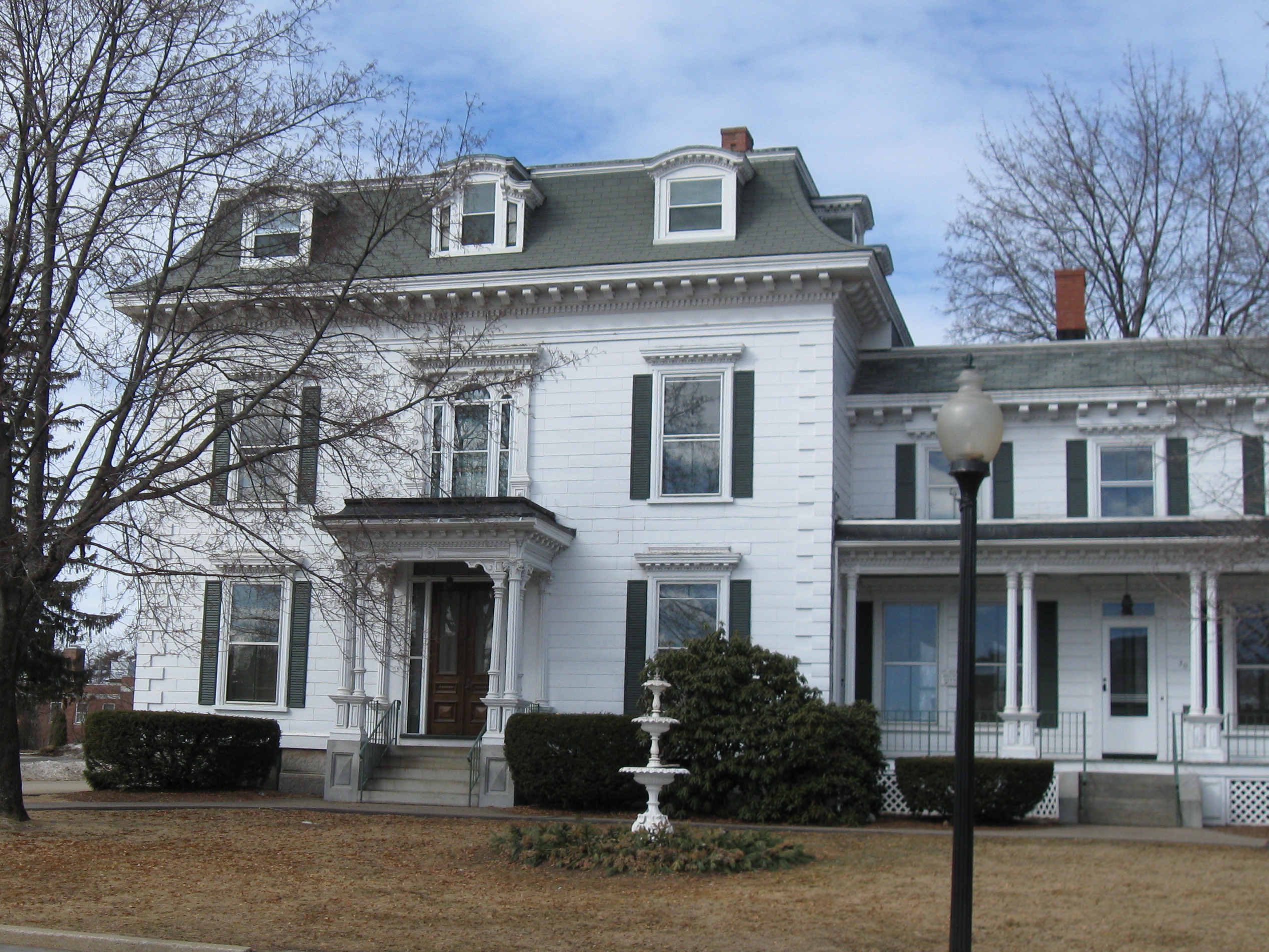

- Location within New Hampshire Location within the United States
- Location: 30 Church St., Laconia, New Hampshire
- Coordinates: 43°31′48″N 71°28′16″W
- Area: less than one acre
- Built: 1865
- Architect: Davis, Arthur L.
- Architectural style: Second Empire
- NRHP reference No.: 94001094
- Added to NRHP: September 19, 1994

The John W. Busiel House is a historic house at 30 Church Street in Laconia, New Hampshire. It was built in 1865 by John W. Busiel, owner of a local textile mill. It is now, as it was at the time of its construction, one of the finest 19th-century houses in the city, and is an excellent and little-altered example of Second Empire style. Since 1905 it has served as the rectory for the St. Joseph Roman Catholic church. The house was listed on the National Register of Historic Places in 1994.

== Description and history ==
The John W. Busiel House is located on the north side of Laconia's downtown area, on the north side of Church Street opposite Beacon Street East. It is a 2 1/2-story wood-frame structure, with a mansard roof providing a full third floor in the attic level. Its exterior is finished with rusticated horizontal wood planking, with wooden quoins articulating the corners. The main facade is three bays wide, with the main entrance at the center, sheltered by an elaborate flat-roof portico. It is supported by paired round columns, with decorative brackets at the top beneath a dentillated projecting cornice. Windows are set in rectangular openings topped by dentillated projecting caps, and the main roof has a cornice with modillions and dentil moulding. The mansard roof is pierced by three dormers, each capped by a segmented arch with more dentil moulding. The central dormer is slightly wider, with narrow sidelight windows flanking the main window. A two-story ell extends to the right.

At the time of this house's construction in 1865, John Busiel was already a prominent local figure as the owner of one of its major businesses. The house, along with a carriage house and shed, were built at the then-high cost of $15,000. It is a relatively early example in the region of the Second Empire style, which did not reach wider popularity until the 1870s, and is certainly Laconia's oldest surviving example of the style. The building originally had a cupola, which has (along with the carriage house) been lost. The house was occupied by Busiel's widow until 1901, and in 1905 it was purchased by the Roman Catholic Diocese of Manchester for use as a rectory for the neighboring St. Joseph's Church.

== See also ==
- National Register of Historic Places listings in Belknap County, New Hampshire
