= Monument Square Historic District =

Monument Square Historic District may refer to:

- Monument Square Historic District (Charlestown, Boston, Massachusetts), location of the Bunker Hill Monument
- Monument Square Historic District (Jamaica Plain, Boston, Massachusetts)
- Monument Square Historic District (Leominster, Massachusetts), listed on the NRHP in Massachusetts
- Monument Square-Eagle Street Historic District North Adams, Massachusetts, listed on the NRHP in Massachusetts
- Monument Square Historic District (Alton, New Hampshire), listed on the NRHP in Belknap County, New Hampshire

== See also ==
- Urbana Monument Square Historic District, Urbana, Ohio
