= Evangelical Baptist Church =

Evangelical Baptist Church may refer to:

- Apostolic Christian Church, historically known as the Evangelical Baptist Church
- Evangelical Baptist Church (Laconia, New Hampshire), United States
- Evangelical Baptist Church (Newton, Massachusetts), United States
- Evangelical Baptist Church of the Central African Republic
- Evangelical Baptist Church of Ethiopia
- Evangelical Baptist Church of Korea
- General Conference of the Evangelical Baptist Church
