= National Register of Historic Places listings in Belknap County, New Hampshire =

Location of Belknap County in New Hampshire

Belknap County, New Hampshire, United States, has 47 properties and districts listed on the National Register of Historic Places. Latitude and longitude coordinates are provided for many National Register properties and districts; these locations may be seen together in a map.

Contents: Counties in New Hampshire
Belknap - Carroll - Cheshire - Coös - Grafton - Hillsborough - Merrimack - Rockingham - Strafford - Sullivan

This National Park Service list is complete through NPS recent listings posted April 24, 2026.

== Current listings ==
	Name on the Register	Image	Date listed	Location	City or town	Description
1	Alton Bay Railroad Station	Alton Bay Railroad Station	September 22, 1983 (#83001124)	NH 11; 43°28′24″N 71°14′17″W	Alton	
2	Bay Meeting House and Vestry	Bay Meeting House and Vestry	June 7, 1984 (#84002508i)	Upper Bay and Steele Rds. 43°32′17″N 71°32′12″W	Sanbornton	
3	Belknap-Sulloway Mill	Belknap-Sulloway Mill	January 25, 1971 (#71000046)	25 Beacon Street East; 43°31′39″N 71°28′07″W	Laconia	Now the Belknap Mill Museum; listed as being on "Mill Street".
4	Belmont Public Library	Belmont Public Library	September 12, 1985 (#85002191)	Main St. 43°26′37″N 71°28′57″W	Belmont	
5	John W. Busiel House	John W. Busiel House	September 19, 1994 (#94001094)	30 Church St. 43°31′48″N 71°28′16″W	Laconia	
6	Busiel-Seeburg Mill	Busiel-Seeburg Mill	January 25, 1971 (#71000047)	1 Mill Plaza; 43°31′40″N 71°28′06″W	Laconia	Listed as being on "Mill Street"
7	Centre Congregational Church	Centre Congregational Church	September 8, 1983 (#83001125)	Province Rd. 43°25′31″N 71°24′51″W	Gilmanton	
8	Centre Harbor Village Historic District	Centre Harbor Village Historic District	September 8, 1983 (#83001126)	Main and Plymouth Sts. 43°42′32″N 71°27′46″W	Center Harbor	
9	Colonial Theatre Complex	Colonial Theatre Complex	November 5, 2020 (#100005742)	609–621 Main St. and 21–31 Canal St. 43°31′42″N 71°28′13″W	Laconia	
10	Dana Meeting House	Dana Meeting House	December 13, 1984 (#84000516)	Dana Hill Rd. 43°38′34″N 71°38′00″W	New Hampton	
11	District No. 9 Schoolhouse	District No. 9 Schoolhouse	March 15, 2000 (#00000198)	358 Hoyt Rd. 43°31′48″N 71°23′48″W	Gilford	
12	Endicott Rock	Endicott Rock	May 28, 1980 (#80000264)	Weirs Channel; 43°36′20″N 71°27′22″W	Laconia (Weirs Beach)	
13	Evangelical Baptist Church	Evangelical Baptist Church	September 12, 1985 (#85002189)	Veterans Sq. 43°31′45″N 71°28′20″W	Laconia	
14	Federal Building	Federal Building	October 25, 2011 (#11000766)	719 Main St. 43°31′50″N 71°28′17″W	Laconia	
15	First Baptist Church of Gilmanton	First Baptist Church of Gilmanton	December 1, 1989 (#89002059)	Province Rd./NH 107, 0.25 miles north of Stage Rd. 43°22′51″N 71°21′14″W	Gilmanton	
16	First Congregational Church	First Congregational Church	March 9, 1990 (#90000386)	Church St, west of Main St. 43°27′17″N 71°13′20″W	Alton	
17	First Free Will Baptist Church in Meredith	First Free Will Baptist Church in Meredith	December 1, 1986 (#86003368)	Winona Rd. 43°38′48″N 71°32′15″W	Meredith	
18	First Freewill Baptist Church	First Freewill Baptist Church	August 2, 1978 (#78000209)	North of Lovelock; 43°31′09″N 71°12′00″W	East Alton	
19	Oscar Foss Memorial Library	Oscar Foss Memorial Library	November 7, 1985 (#85002779)	Main St. 43°20′21″N 71°15′38″W	Barnstead	
20	Gale Memorial Library	Gale Memorial Library	September 12, 1985 (#85002185)	695 Main St. 43°31′47″N 71°28′17″W	Laconia	
21	Dudley Gilman Homestead	Dudley Gilman Homestead	April 7, 2023 (#100008793)	60 Mile Hill Rd. 43°30′23″N 71°28′13″W	Belmont	
22	Gilmanton Academy	Gilmanton Academy	September 8, 1983 (#83001127)	Province Rd. 43°25′30″N 71°24′50″W	Gilmanton	
23	Gilmanton Ironworks Library	Gilmanton Ironworks Library	March 16, 1989 (#89000188)	Elm St. 43°25′03″N 71°17′47″W	Gilmanton	
24	Gordon-Nash Library	Gordon-Nash Library	September 15, 1988 (#88001437)	Main St. 43°36′19″N 71°39′09″W	New Hampton	
25	Ossian Wilbur Goss Reading Room	Ossian Wilbur Goss Reading Room	September 4, 1986 (#86002165)	188 Elm St. 43°32′57″N 71°27′59″W	Laconia (Lakeport)	
26	House by the Side of the Road	House by the Side of the Road	November 26, 1980 (#80000265)	61 School St. 43°26′51″N 71°35′24″W	Tilton	
27	Abraham Jaquith House	Abraham Jaquith House	1991 (#90000166)	43°23′33″N 71°21′56″W	Gilmanton, New Hampshire	Built 1725 in Billerica, Massachusetts, moved to Gilmanton in 2000.
28	Kimball Castle	Kimball Castle	August 16, 1982 (#82001666)	Locke's Hill Rd. 43°35′01″N 71°22′46″W	Gilford	
29	Laconia District Court	Laconia District Court	November 9, 1982 (#82004990)	Academy Sq. 43°31′25″N 71°28′11″W	Laconia	
30	Laconia Passenger Station	Laconia Passenger Station	January 11, 1982 (#82001667)	Veterans Sq. 43°31′45″N 71°28′21″W	Laconia	
31	Lochmere Archeological District	Lochmere Archeological District	November 1, 1982 (#82000615)	West bank of the Winnipesaukee River	Tilton	A large area containing numerous Native American artifacts; sites in the district are partially compromised by construction.
32	Meredith Public Library	Meredith Public Library	December 13, 1984 (#84000514)	50 Main St. 43°39′19″N 71°30′01″W	Meredith	
33	Monument Square Historic District	Monument Square Historic District	March 15, 1984 (#84002512)	Main, Factory, Church, and Depot Sts. 43°27′19″N 71°13′11″W	Alton	
34	Washington Mooney House	Washington Mooney House	September 4, 1997 (#97001102)	Junction of NH 104 and Interstate 93; 43°36′52″N 71°38′29″W	New Hampton	
35	John J. Morrill Store	John J. Morrill Store	August 29, 1980 (#80000266)	Belknap Mountain Rd. 43°32′52″N 71°24′23″W	Gilford	
36	New Hampshire Veterans' Association Historic District	New Hampshire Veterans' Association Historic District	May 22, 1980 (#80000267)	North of Laconia on Lakeside Ave. 43°36′21″N 71°27′43″W	Laconia (Weirs Beach)	
37	New Hampton Community Church	New Hampton Community Church	March 7, 1985 (#85000474)	Main St. 43°36′23″N 71°38′55″W	New Hampton	
38	New Hampton Town House	New Hampton Town House	March 23, 1998 (#98000198)	Junction of Dana Hill and Town House Roads; 43°37′27″N 71°37′43″W	New Hampton	
39	Benjamin Rowe House	Benjamin Rowe House	April 30, 2008 (#07000552)	88 Belknap Mountain Rd. 43°32′37″N 71°24′10″W	Gilford	
40	Sanbornton Square Historic District	Sanbornton Square Historic District	December 8, 1980 (#80000417)	Sanbornton Square; 43°29′33″N 71°35′01″W	Sanbornton	
41	Second Free Baptist Church	Second Free Baptist Church	March 9, 1990 (#90000387)	Main St., south of Church St. 43°27′18″N 71°13′14″W	Alton	
42	Smith Meeting House	Smith Meeting House	March 23, 1998 (#98000196)	Junction of Smith Meetinghouse, Parsonage Hill, and Joe Jones Rds. 43°24′57″N 71°21′48″W	Gilmanton	
43	Tilton Downtown Historic District	Tilton Downtown Historic District	July 7, 1983 (#83001128)	Roughly Main St. between Central and Bridge Sts. 43°26′34″N 71°35′25″W	Tilton	
44	Tilton Island Park Bridge	Tilton Island Park Bridge	March 21, 1980 (#80000268)	Tilton Island Park; 43°26′32″N 71°35′13″W	Tilton	Over the Winnipesaukee River
45	Charles E. Tilton Mansion	Charles E. Tilton Mansion	August 10, 1982 (#82004995)	School St. 43°26′38″N 71°35′28″W	Tilton	
46	United Baptist Church of Lakeport	United Baptist Church of Lakeport	June 6, 1985 (#85001198)	23 Park St. 43°32′56″N 71°27′48″W	Laconia (Lakeport)	
47	US Post Office-Laconia Main	US Post Office-Laconia Main	July 18, 1986 (#86002252)	33 Church St. 43°31′47″N 71°28′10″W	Laconia	
48	The Weirs	The Weirs	May 12, 1975 (#75000120)	Near outlet of Lake Winnipesaukee	Laconia (Weirs Beach)	Major Native American archeological site.

== See also ==
- List of National Historic Landmarks in New Hampshire
- National Register of Historic Places listings in New Hampshire
