= New Hampshire Veterans' Association Historic District =

Historic district in New Hampshire, United States

- U.S. National Register of Historic Places
- U.S. Historic district
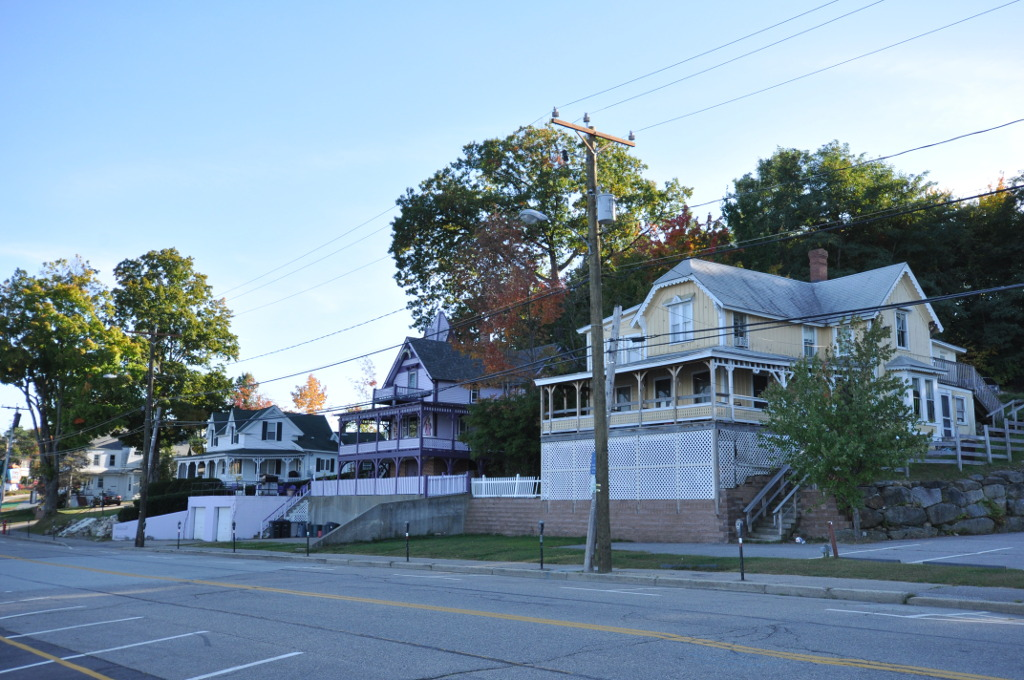
- Buildings on Lakeside Avenue

- Location within New Hampshire Location within the United States
- Location: Weirs Beach, Laconia, New Hampshire
- Coordinates: 43°36′23″N 71°27′32″W
- Area: 7.7 acres (3.1 ha)
- Built: 1875
- Architect: Multiple
- Architectural style: Queen Anne
- NRHP reference No.: 80000267
- Added to NRHP: May 22, 1980

The New Hampshire Veterans' Association Historic District encompasses a large cluster of late 19th-century summer resort properties in the Weirs Beach area of Laconia, New Hampshire, United States. The district is a nearly 8-acre (3.2 ha) area developed by the New Hampshire Veterans' Association, which was formed to support summer reunions of veterans of the American Civil War. Over the following decades the group expanded its range to encompass veterans from all of the United States' war efforts. The architecture of the resort area the association developed is distinctive, as the resort houses were built to accommodate entire regiments. The district includes 18 buildings, five of which front on Lakeside Avenue and have expansive views of Lake Winnipesaukee and the Weirs Beach area. Most of the remaining buildings are located on Veterans Avenue, which runs roughly parallel to, and behind, Lakeside Avenue. The district was listed on the National Register of Historic Places in 1980.

The New Hampshire Veterans' Association was founded in 1875, and began holding reunions at Weirs Beach the following year. These were held on land owned by the Concord and Montreal Railroad (later the Boston and Maine), which was only purchased by the association in 1924. From the mid-1880s into the 1890s regimental organizations built predominantly Queen Anne-styled buildings to quarter the reunion attendees and to facilitate their activities.

The association's land also has archaeological importance. It encompasses a portion of what was once the Native American village of Aquadoctan, one of the largest settlements in the state with a long prehistoric and historic record. Areas adjacent to this property are also listed on the National Register for their archaeological significance.

== See also ==
- National Register of Historic Places listings in Belknap County, New Hampshire
