= Alton Bay station =

- Alton Bay Railroad Station
- U.S. National Register of Historic Places
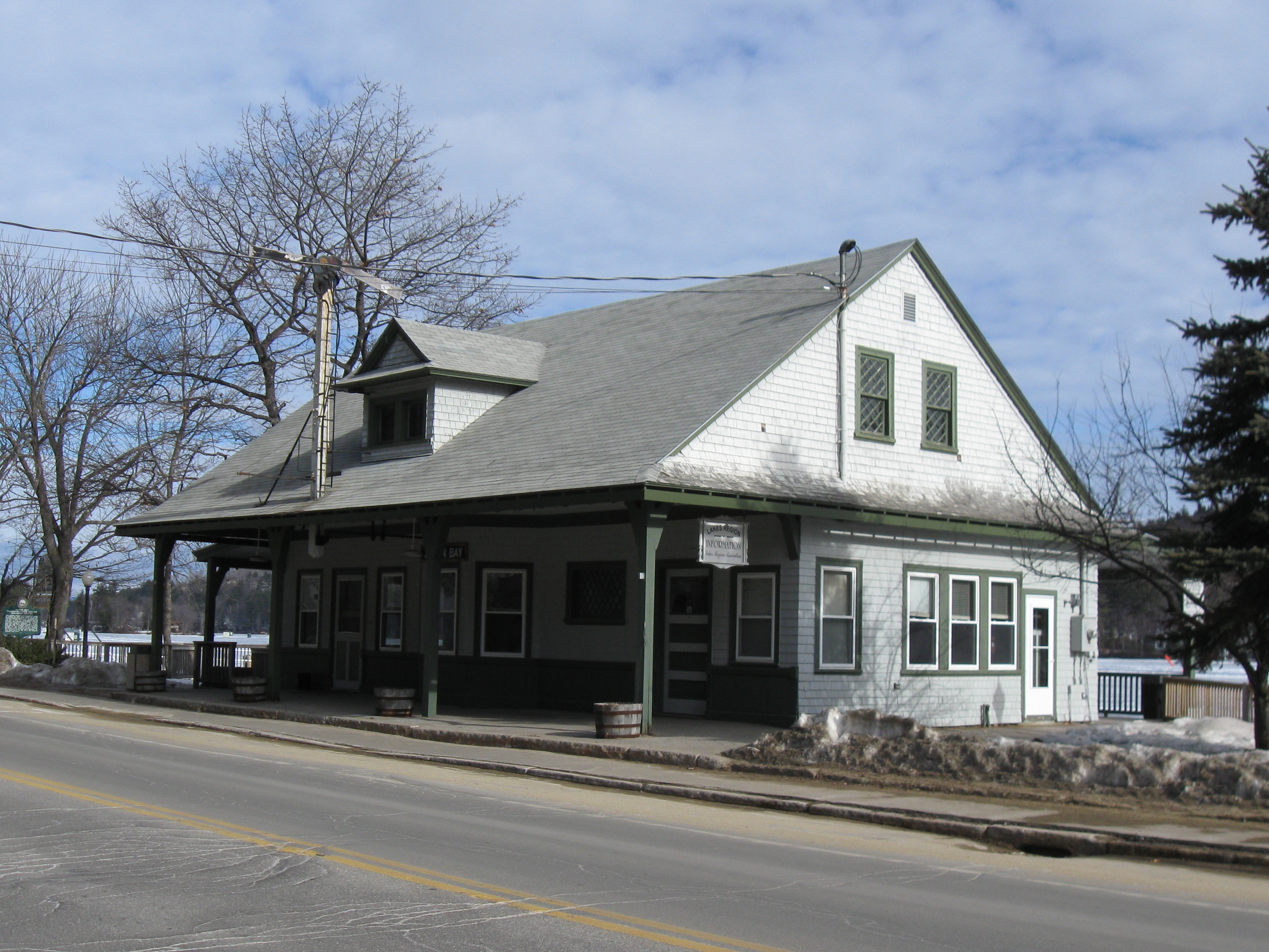

- Location within New Hampshire Location within the United States
- Location: 164 NH 11, Alton, New Hampshire
- Coordinates: 43°28′24″N 71°14′17″W
- Area: 0.2 acres (0.081 ha)
- Built: 1907
- Architect: Killam, Lewis
- Architectural style: Shingle Style
- NRHP reference No.: 83001124
- Added to NRHP: September 22, 1983

Alton Bay station is a former railroad station on New Hampshire Route 11 in Alton Bay, New Hampshire. Built in 1907 by the Boston and Maine Railroad, it is a surviving reminder of the importance of the railroad to the development of Alton Bay as a summer resort community. The building, now in use as a community center, was listed on the National Register of Historic Places in 1983 as Alton Bay Railroad Station.

== Description and history ==
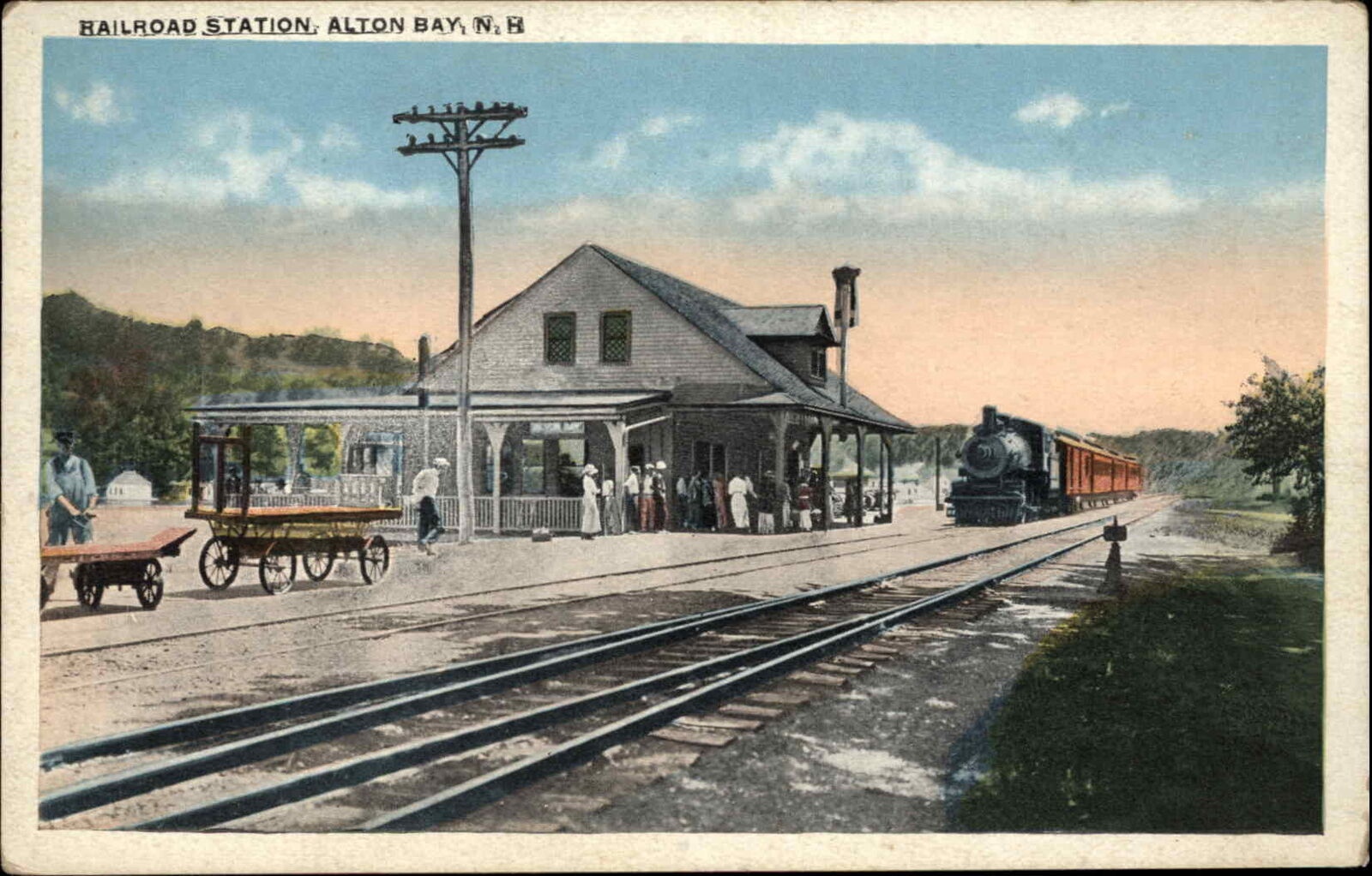
Circa-1920s postcard of the station

The former station is located near the southern end of Alton Bay, a finger extending southward from the main body of Lake Winnipesaukee that is its southernmost extent. It is located on a narrow strip of land with the bay to the east and New Hampshire Route 11 to the west. It is a 1 1/2-story wood-frame structure, with a gabled roof and shingled exterior. The western facade historically faced the tracks of the Boston and Maine Railroad. The roof on this side hangs over a recessed porch, which is supported by square columns and large wooden brackets. The lower portion of the walls on this side are finished in wainscoting, and there is a projecting bay at the center where the stationmaster's office was located. The north and east sides of the building are sheltered by a shed-roof porch that was added by the railroad during the station's period of active service. The interior, although it has been extensively altered, retains some original features, including beadboard ceilings and walls, and most of the features of the original restroom spaces.

Railroad service was introduced to Alton Bay by the Cocheco Railroad in 1851, introducing steamship service on the lake at the same time. This use of Alton Bay as a transfer point led to the community's development, both for through passengers and as a destination in its own right. The Cocheco's line was eventually taken over by the Boston and Maine, by lease in 1863 and by purchase in 1892. This station was the third built on the site, the first two having succumbed to fire. The station continued to be a major transit point, even after it ceased to be the railroad endpoint, with service extended to Lakeport in 1890. Train service to Alton Bay was ended in 1935, and the town purchased the building two years later. It was converted into a community center in 1957.

== See also ==
- National Register of Historic Places listings in Belknap County, New Hampshire
