= John J. Morrill Store =

- U.S. National Register of Historic Places
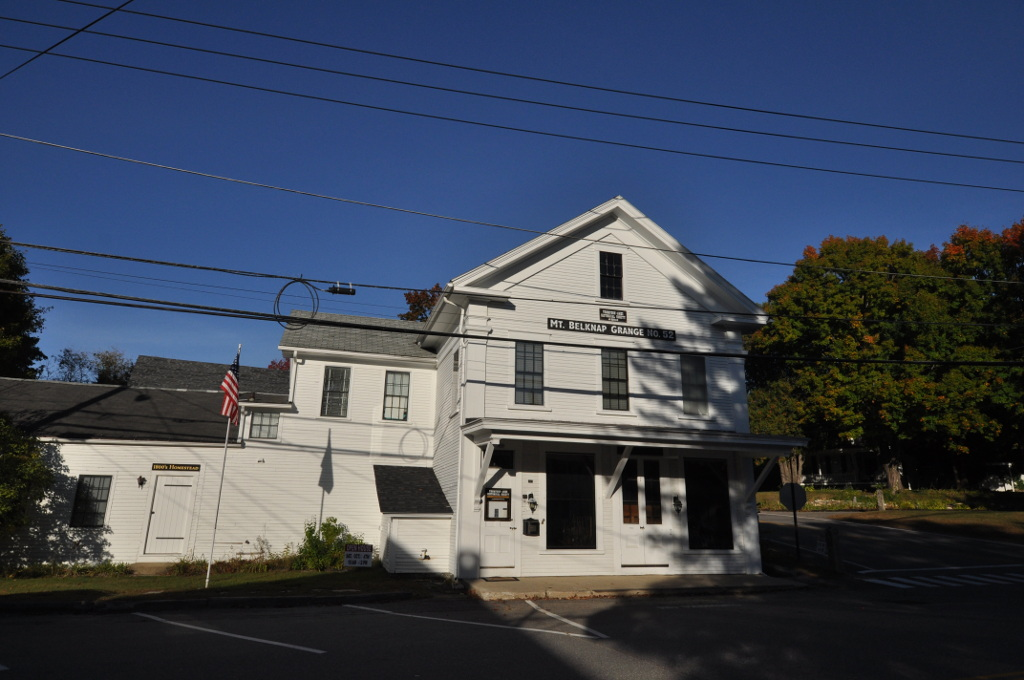

- Location within New Hampshire Location within the United States
- Location: Belknap Mountain Rd., Gilford, New Hampshire
- Coordinates: 43°32′52″N 71°24′23″W
- Area: 0.2 acres (0.081 ha)
- Built: 1857
- Architectural style: Greek Revival
- NRHP reference No.: 80000266
- Added to NRHP: August 29, 1980

The John J. Morrill Store is a historic store and Grange hall on Belknap Mountain Road in the central village of Gilford, New Hampshire. Built in the late 1850s, it is a well-preserved example of a period general store with Greek Revival features. The building has also served as the local post office and as a Grange hall. It was listed on the National Register of Historic Places in 1980.

== Description and history ==
The former Morrill Store building is located in the center of Gilford village, at the northwest corner of Belknap Mountain Road and Potter Hill Road. It is a 2 1/2-story wood frame clapboarded structure with a gable roof. It is predominantly Greek Revival in style, with pilastered corner boards, and with entablatures and friezes above. A shed-roof porch extends across the main facade, supported by simple brackets. The first floor of the facade has two entrances: a nearly central double-leaf entry flanked by display windows, and a single-leaf entry at the left side, which provides access to the upper floors. A two-story frame addition extends to the left of the main block, with a 1 1/2-story addition extending further from that.

The structure was built as a general store in the late 1850s by John Morrill, but the business only lasted a few years. For this use, the ground floor served as the shop, and the upper floor was a storeroom. It served for many years as the local post office, and was purchased by the local Grange organization in 1909. That organization made a series of interior alterations to facilitate its use, converting the retail space into a kitchen and dining hall. In later years it added modernizations, including a modern heating plant. In the 1950s the end wing was adapted for use by the Junior Grange.

== See also ==
- National Register of Historic Places listings in Belknap County, New Hampshire
