= Evangelical Baptist Church (Laconia, New Hampshire) =

Historic church building in New Hampshire, United States

- The Cake Theater
- U.S. National Register of Historic Places
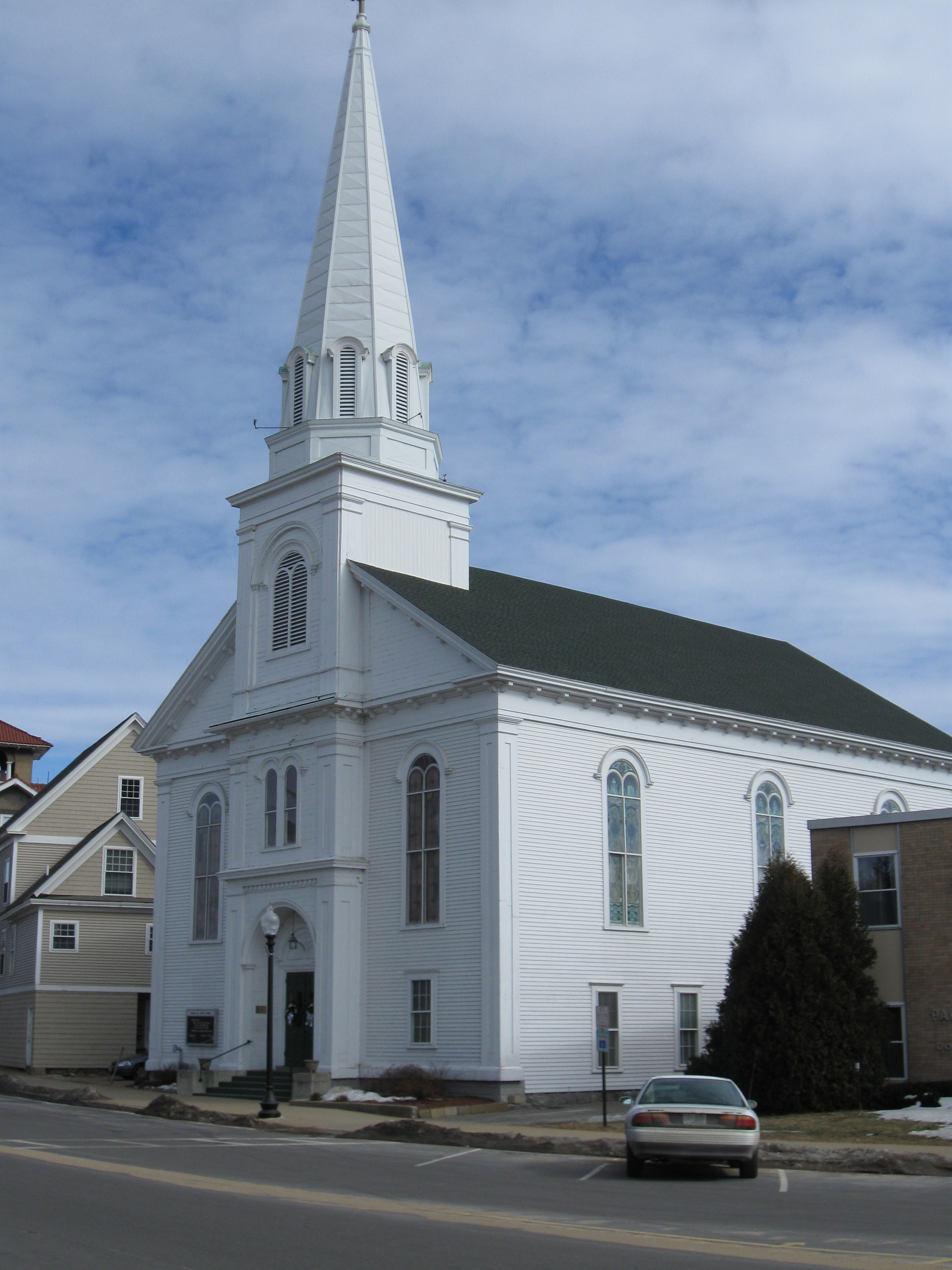

- Location within New Hampshire Location within the United States
- Location: Veterans Square, Laconia, New Hampshire
- Coordinates: 43°31′45″N 71°28′20″W
- Area: 0.1 acres (0.040 ha)
- Built: 1836
- Architect: Davis, Arthur L.
- Architectural style: Greek Revival, Gothic
- NRHP reference No.: 85002189
- Added to NRHP: September 12, 1985

The Cake Theater (formally known as Meredith Bridge Congregational Church, Laconia Congregational and, Evangelical Baptist Church) is a historic building on Veterans Square in Laconia, New Hampshire, United States. Built in 1836 and extensively restyled in 1871, it is a fine 19th-century building, illustrating adaptive alterations made over time to reflect changing uses and tastes. The building was listed on the National Register of Historic Places in 1985.[1]

== Description and history ==
The building stands on the east side of Veterans Square in central Laconia, adjacent to the current Congregational church, and across from the former train station. It is a two-story wood-frame structure, with a gabled roof and clapboarded exterior. A square tower projects slightly from the front facade, rising to an octagonal spire. The building corners have paneled pilasters, which rise to an entablature and modillioned cornice. Ground floor windows are small rectangular sash, while the upper floor windows are tall with rounded arches, and embedded pairs of round-arch windows within.

The building was built in 1836 for a Congregationalist congregation, replacing an older church which had burned. Originally built with Greek Revival features, it underwent major exterior alterations in 1871, adding a second floor (by raising the building and building a new lower level), and a taller tower. The church was extensively damaged in 1902, when a fire in the city center set off gunpowder at a nearby hardware store. The damaged building was purchased by a Baptist congregation, and moved to its present location in 1903. The upper stages of the tower were toppled in the New England Hurricane of 1938, resulting in the construction of a new steeple and the installation of a new bell.

The Evangelical Baptist Church was the last congregation to occupy the building before moving to the former Our Lady of the Lakes campus on Washington Street in Lakeport in 2013. The building was converted into The Holy Grail Restaurant and Pub, which opened on Memorial Day in May 2014 but closed its doors at the end of April 2017. On May 5, 2020, the Laconia Daily Sun reported that the building had been purchased by Justin Spencer of Recycled Percussion.

== See also ==
- National Register of Historic Places listings in Belknap County, New Hampshire
