= Washington Mooney House =

Historic house in New Hampshire, United States

- U.S. National Register of Historic Places
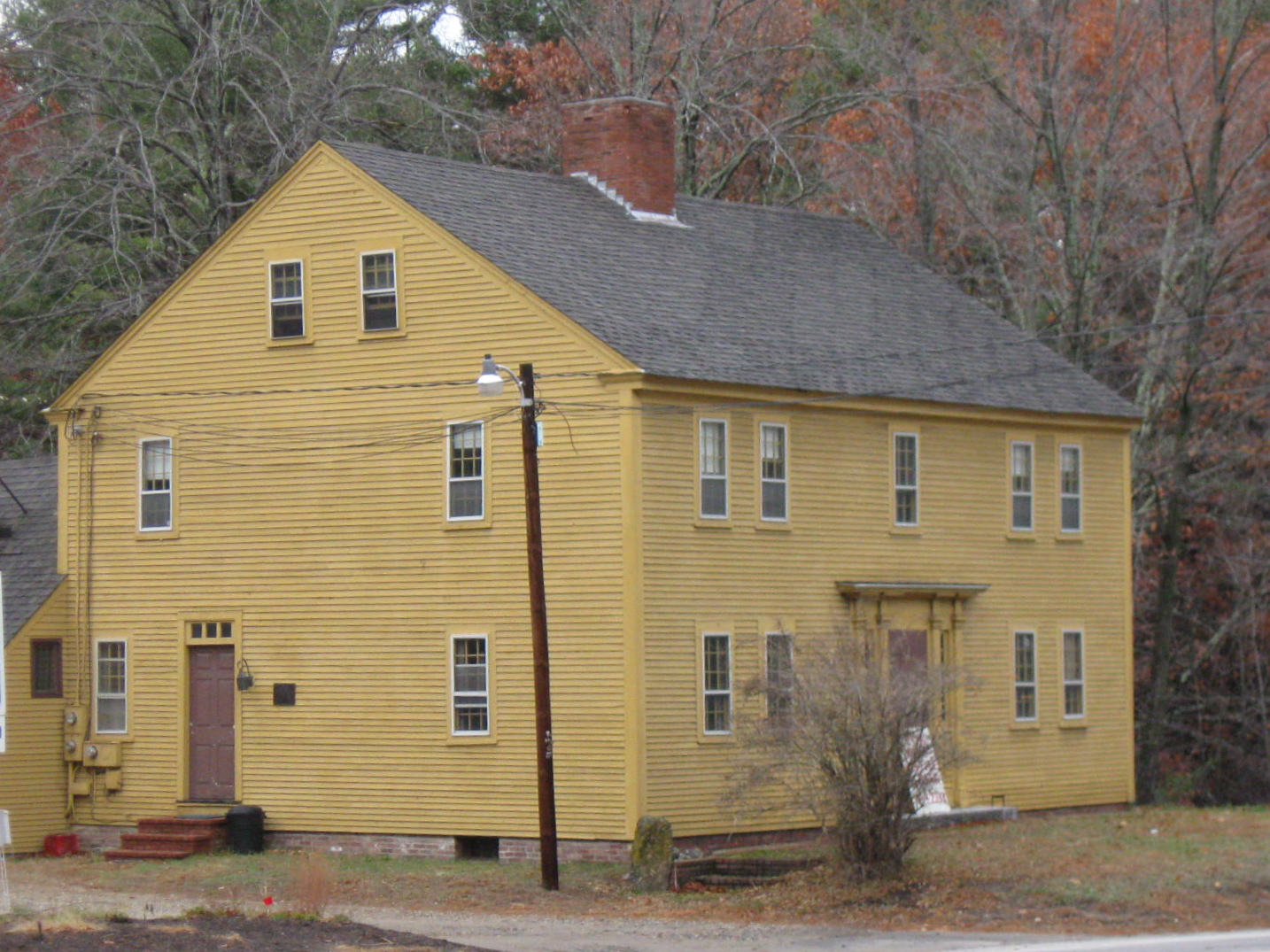

- Location within New Hampshire Location within the United States
- Location: Jct. of NH 104 and I-93, New Hampton, New Hampshire
- Coordinates: 43°36′52″N 71°38′29″W
- Area: 5.4 acres (2.2 ha)
- Built: 1800
- Architectural style: Federal
- NRHP reference No.: 97001102
- Added to NRHP: September 4, 1997

The Washington Mooney House is a historic house on New Hampshire Route 104, near its junction with New Hampshire Route 132 and Interstate 93, in New Hampton, New Hampshire. Built c. 1800, this 2 1/2-story wood-frame house is one of the finest surviving Federal period houses in the town. The house was listed on the National Register of Historic Places in 1997.

== Description and history ==
The Washington Mooney House stands in central New Hampton, on the north side of New Hampshire Route 104, just east of the northbound I-93 onramp. It is a 2 1/2-story wood-frame structure, with a side-gable roof, central chimney, and clapboarded exterior. Its main facade is five bays wide, with a symmetrical arrangement. The main entrance is at the center, with an entrance surround of sidelight windows flanked on both sides by narrow pilasters, and a projecting cornice above. The interior follows a fairly typical central chimney plan, with a narrow vestibule that has a winding staircase in front of the chimney, parlor spaces on either side, and the kitchen extending across most of the rear. The interior retains original floorboards, wainscoting, and interior window shutters, and includes paneled fireplace surrounds in the parlors.

Its builder is unknown; the house and associated farm property were probably purchased by Washington Mooney around the time of his 1831 marriage. Despite adaptive reuse of the property in the 20th century for office space, and a succession of owners, the basic fabric of the building has remained little altered. The building is locally distinctive for its particularly fine entrance surround and central hall.

== See also ==
- National Register of Historic Places listings in Belknap County, New Hampshire
