= Centre Harbor Village Historic District =

Historic district in New Hampshire, United States

- U.S. National Register of Historic Places
- U.S. Historic district
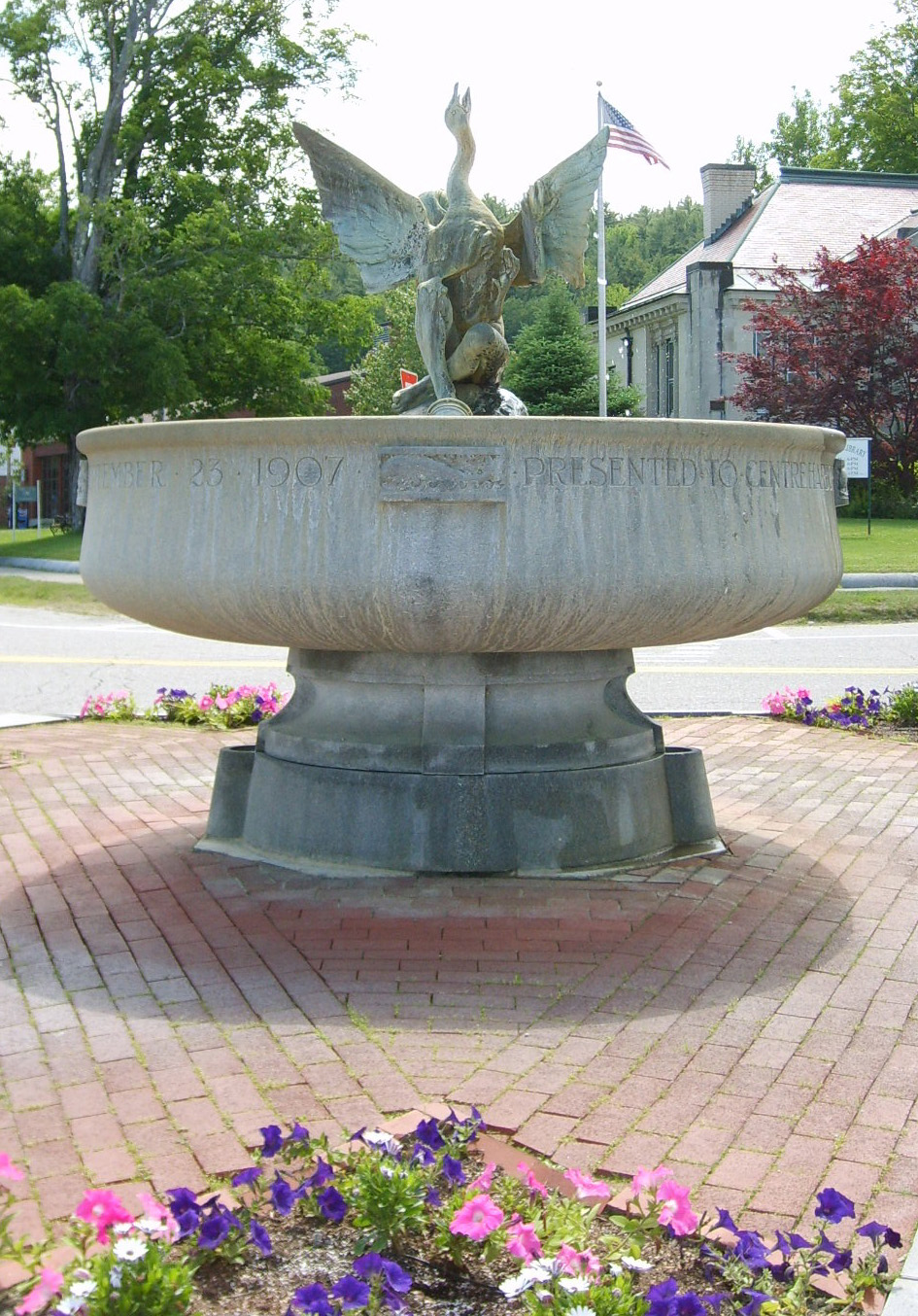
- Kona Fountain

- Location within New Hampshire Location within the United States
- Location: Main and Plymouth Sts., Center Harbor, New Hampshire
- Coordinates: 43°42′31.9″N 71°27′45.5″W
- Area: 15 acres (6.1 ha)
- Built: 1800
- Architect: Multiple
- Architectural style: Classical Revival, Greek Revival, Late Victorian
- NRHP reference No.: 83001126
- Added to NRHP: September 08, 1983

The Centre Harbor Village Historic District encompasses the historic village of Center Harbor, New Hampshire. It consists of a small cluster of properties located north of Plymouth Street and Main Street, as well as the Nichols Memorial Library (located just south of the junction of the two streets with Old Meredith Road), and the Kona Fountain, which is located in the center of that intersection. It was added to the National Register of Historic Places in 1983.

The village of Center Harbor arose in the late 18th century at a natural transit point dictated by the geography of Lake Winnipesaukee, whose northwesterly major port it is, Squam Lake, which lies a few miles to the north, and hilly terrain separating the two bodies of water. With the advent of steamboats and railroads in the mid-19th century, it became a major transit point for travelers to the White Mountains, and prospered from the tourist trade. About half the village's ten buildings predate 1850, while the rest were built between then and about 1920, reflecting this period of economic success.

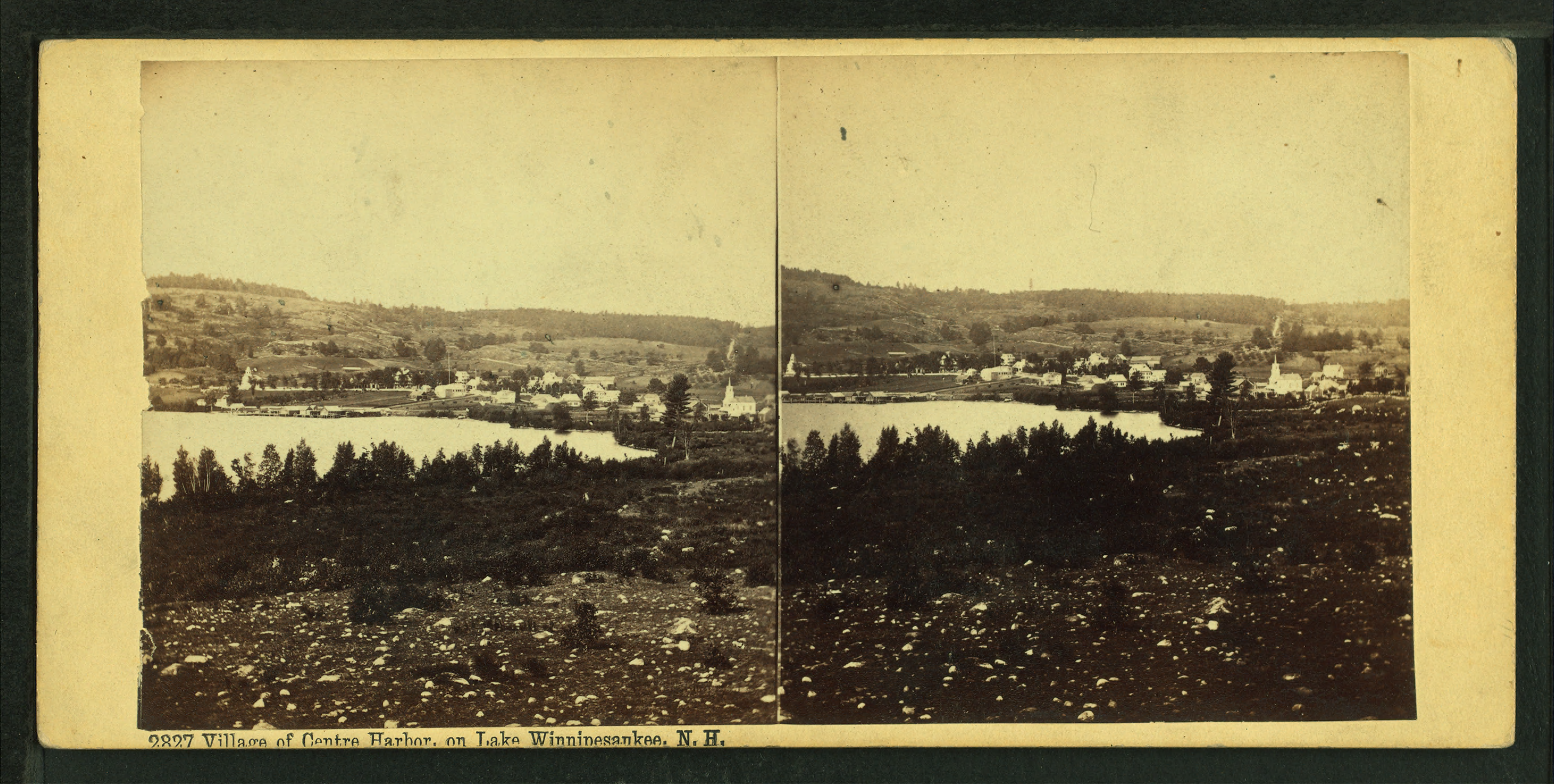
Village of Centre Harbor on Lake Winnipesaukee stereoscopic image by Bierstadt Brothers (19th century)

The oldest building in the district is probably the Locust Cottage, built c. 1800. It is a two-story wood-frame structure, distinctive for its porch with latticework balustrade. The Morse & Stanley Block is a commercial wood-frame building which was built before 1837, but was altered somewhat and now has the appearance of a late-19th-century commercial building. Three other houses predate 1837, the most notable being the Coe House and Barn, built in 1820 but significantly expanded and restyled c. 1850 with the latest Victorian architectural fashion. The Kona Drinking Fountain which adorns the main intersection was dedicated in 1907; it was a gift of businessman Herbert Dumaresq, owner of the Kona Farm estate in nearby Moultonborough. The Nichols Memorial Library was a gift of summer resident James E. Nichols of New York City; it is a Classical Revival structure built in 1909.

== See also ==
- National Register of Historic Places listings in Belknap County, New Hampshire
