= Colonial Theatre Complex =

- U.S. National Register of Historic Places
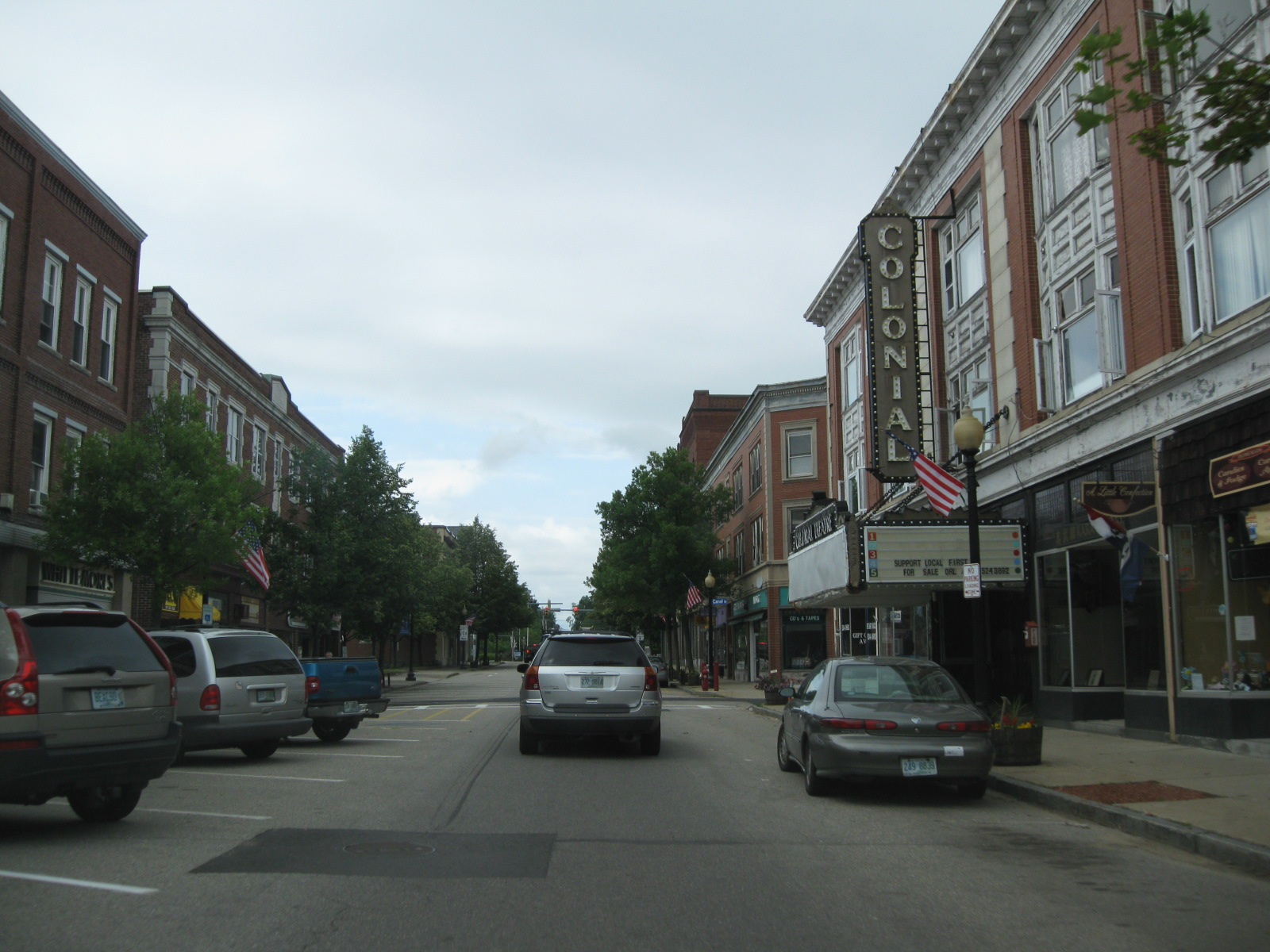
- Marquee of the theatre (center right) on Main Street

- Location within New Hampshire Location within the United States
- Location: 609–621 Main St. and 21–31 Canal St., Laconia, New Hampshire
- Coordinates: 43.5284°N 71.4702°W
- Built: 1914
- NRHP reference No.: 100005742
- Added to NRHP: November 5, 2020

The Colonial Theatre Complex is a group of historic buildings in Laconia, New Hampshire. There are three sections to the complex: the Piscopo Block, Colonial Theatre, and Canal Street Annex. The Piscopo Block, which contains the main entrance to the theatre, is distinguished by a large marquee spelling out "COLONIAL" that is located on Main Street (New Hampshire Route 106). The complex was built in 1914, and was added to the National Register of Historic Places in 2020.

== See also ==
- National Register of Historic Places listings in Belknap County, New Hampshire
