= Belknap-Sulloway Mill =

- U.S. National Register of Historic Places
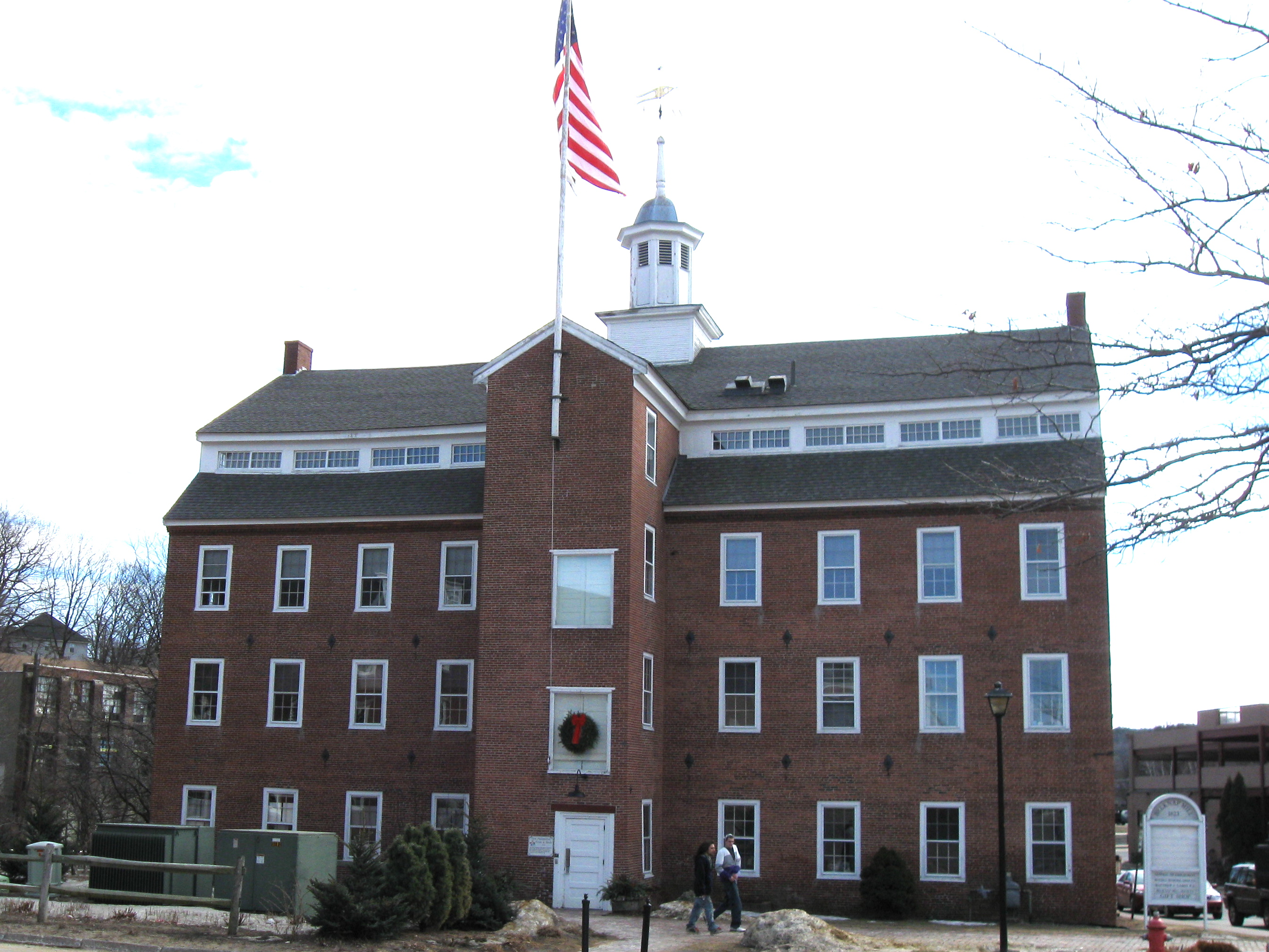

- Location within New Hampshire Location within the United States
- Location: 25 Beacon Street East, Laconia, New Hampshire
- Coordinates: 43°31′39″N 71°28′7″W
- Area: 1 acre (0.40 ha)
- Built: 1823
- NRHP reference No.: 71000046
- Added to NRHP: January 25, 1971

The Belknap-Sulloway Mill, now the Belknap Mill Museum, is a historic mill at 25 Beacon Street East in Laconia, New Hampshire, a city in Belknap County. Built sometime between 1823 and 1828, it is a rare well-preserved example of an early rural textile mill in New England, and was the business around which the city rose. The mill was in active use for the production of textiles until 1969, undergoing some modest alterations as well as the modernization of its power plant. It was opened as a museum in 1991, and was listed on the National Register of Historic Places in 1971.

== Description and history ==
The Belknap-Sulloway Mill is located on the east side of downtown Laconia, between Beacon Street East and the Winnipesaukee River, which historically provided the power for the mill. It is a 3 1/2-story brick structure, with a stepped gable roof that has a band of clerestory windows parallel to the ridge on each side. There are slender chimneys at each end, and a wooden cupola at the center which houses a bell. The north-facing main facade is nine bays wide, with a central rectangular projection housing a staircase. Windows are set in plain rectangular openings. The rear of the building has several smaller single-story brick ells.

The first mill to stand at this site was a wood-frame structure built in 1811, when the area was part of Meredith, New Hampshire. That mill burned in 1823, and this building, its replacement, was reported to be in full operation by 1828. The bell in the cupola is believed to be a recasting of the original mill's bell. Unlike later mills, which used more fire-resistant materials, its interior uses joisted floor construction. Alterations to the structure since its construction include the addition of the door to the stair tower (before 1875) and the ells, which include a c. 1900 addition housing three power turbines.

This mill, along with the nearby Busiel-Seeburg Mill, were responsible for the growth of the area (originally known as Meredith Bridge) into what is now Laconia. It remained in active use until 1969, and opened as a museum in 1991.

== See also ==
- National Register of Historic Places listings in Belknap County, New Hampshire
- New Hampshire Historical Marker No. 135: The Belknap Mill - The Busiel Mill
