= Meredith Public Library =

- U.S. National Register of Historic Places
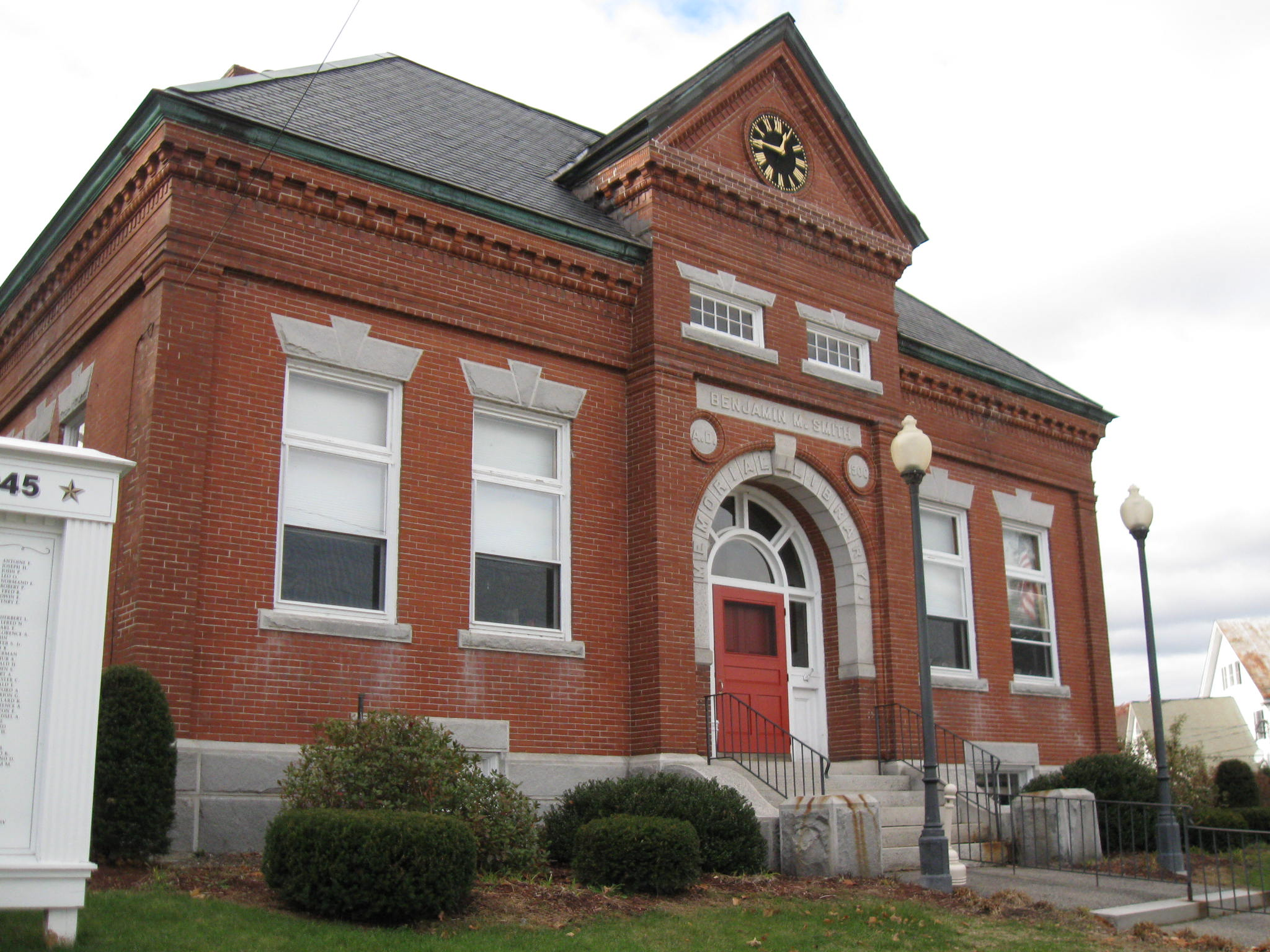

- Location within New Hampshire Location within the United States
- Location: 91 Main St., Meredith, New Hampshire
- Coordinates: 43°39′19″N 71°30′1″W
- Area: 0.5 acres (0.20 ha)
- Built: 1900
- Architect: Swan, George
- Architectural style: Classical Revival
- NRHP reference No.: 84000514
- Added to NRHP: December 13, 1984

The Meredith Public Library is located at 91 Main Street in Meredith, New Hampshire. It is housed in a handsome brick Classical Revival structure designed by George Swan and built in 1900–01, with a major expansion in 1985. It was a gift from Benjamin Smith as a memorial to his parents, and is known as the Benjamin M. Smith Memorial Library. The building, one of the town's most architecturally sophisticated buildings, was listed on the National Register of Historic Places in 1984.

== Architecture and history ==
The Meredith Public Library stands in the town center of Meredith, on the west side of Main Street opposite its junction with Lake Street. It is set on a rise, and looks over the southern end of the village commercial district. It is a single-story masonry structure with Classical Revival styling. The original main block is a T-shaped structure with a hipped roof and a slightly projecting gable above an entry recessed under a round arch. The building corners are pilastered, and there are bands of elaborate corbelling below the main roof. Windows are typically set in rectangular openings, with stone sills and keystoned lintels. The rear wing is less architecturally sophisticated, but with sympathetic styling. The building interior retains many original features, including panelled wainscoting, and Palladian carved motifs on arches separating sections of the interior.

Prior to the construction of this building, Meredith's public library was housed in rented quarters. Construction of this building in 1900-01 was funded by Benjamin Smith as a memorial to his parents, with the proviso that the town acquire the land. It was designed by George Swan, and is the second library in New Hampshire's Lakes Region that was built in the Classical Revival style.

== See also ==
- National Register of Historic Places listings in Belknap County, New Hampshire
