= District No. 9 Schoolhouse =

- U.S. National Register of Historic Places
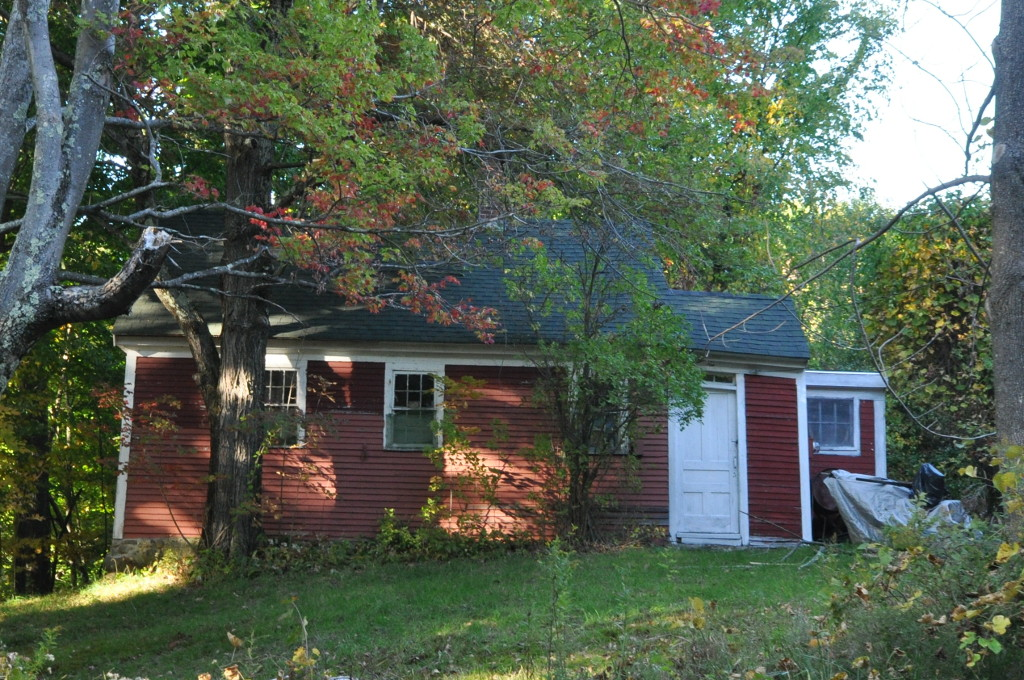

- Location within New Hampshire Location within the United States
- Location: 358 Hoyt Rd., Gilford, New Hampshire
- Coordinates: 43°31′48″N 71°23′48″W
- Area: less than one acre
- Built: 1815
- NRHP reference No.: 00000198
- Added to NRHP: March 15, 2000

The District No. 9 Schoolhouse is a historic school building at 358 Hoyt Road in Gilford, New Hampshire. Built in 1815 and repeatedly altered to accommodated changing trends in school design, it is the best-preserved of Gilford's surviving district schoolhouses. Now a private summer residence, the building was listed on the National Register of Historic Places in 2000.

== Description and history ==
Gilford's former District 9 Schoolhouse is located in a rural setting southeast of the town center, on the north side of Hoyt Road west of its junction with Belknap Mountain Road. It is a 1 1/2-story wood-frame structure, whose main block measures 24 feet (7.3 m) in length and 22 feet (6.7 m) in width. It has a shed-roof projection at one end which houses the main entrance and a vestibule area (dated to the 1830s), and a second shed-roof addition behind that, dating to the early 20th century. The interior space was historically divided into a classroom space and a wood storage area, later converted into a kitchen. The property includes a c. 1924 outhouse.

The school was built in 1815, and was originally covered by a hip roof. This was replaced by the present gable roof around 1835, at the same time the vestibule was added. Additional windows were added in the 1850s, probably in response to state-issued recommendations. Benches were replaced by individual desks and chairs in 1892, around which time blackboards were also installed. The building was used as a school until the mid-1920s, and was converted into a summer residence in 1938.

== See also ==
- National Register of Historic Places listings in Belknap County, New Hampshire
