= Gilmanton Ironworks Library =

- Gilmanton Iron Works Library
- U.S. National Register of Historic Places
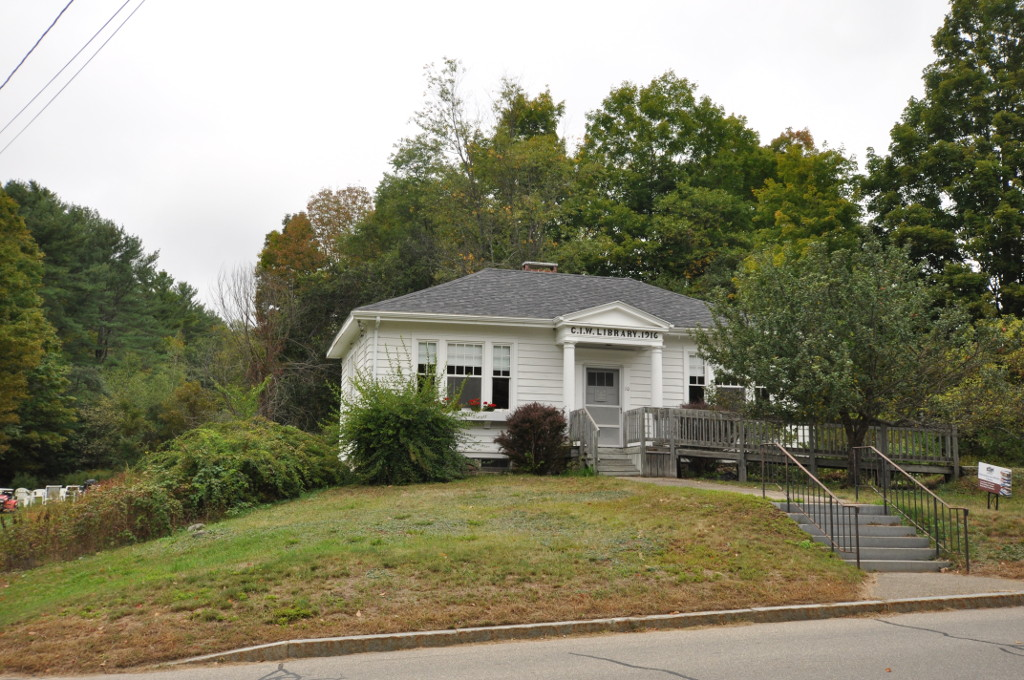

- Location within New Hampshire Location within the United States
- Location: Elm St., Gilmanton, New Hampshire
- Coordinates: 43°25′2″N 71°17′53″W
- Area: 0.3 acres (0.12 ha)
- Built: 1916
- Built by: Twombly, Herbert A.
- Architect: Bacon, Willard M.
- Architectural style: Colonial Revival
- NRHP reference No.: 89000188
- Added to NRHP: March 16, 1989

The Gilmanton Ironworks Library is a historic library building at 10 Elm Street in the Iron Works village of Gilmanton, New Hampshire. Built in 1916–17, it was the first Colonial Revival library building in Belknap County. The building, still serving as a branch of the Gilmanton public library system, was listed on the National Register of Historic Places in 1989.

== Architecture and history ==
The Gilmanton Ironworks Library is located in the center of the village of Gilmanton Ironworks in the east part of the town of Gilmanton, on the west side of Elm Street just south of its junction with New Hampshire Route 140. It is a small single-story wood-frame structure, with a hip roof and clapboarded exterior. Its street-facing facade is three bays wide, with a center entrance sheltered by a gabled portico. The portico features a pair of Doric-style round columns, which support an entablature and fully pedimented gable. The window bays each have three-part windows, with a central picture window flanked by smaller sash windows. The interior layout has a vestibule and central librarian's desk, flanked on one side by the reading room and the other by the stacks.

The first library formed in Gilmanton was a private lending library founded in 1801, and was first located in a private residence near the Smith Meeting House before being moved to Iron Works Village. A second library was founded in 1815 for the use of the Gilmanton Academy, and was located in the town center at Gilmanton Corner Village. The town's public library system was established pursuant to requirement state laws enacted in the 1890s, and by 1915 had branches serving each of the town's three villages. That in Gilmanton Ironworks was located (along with the town selectmen's offices) in one of the village's commercial buildings, which was destroyed in a 1915 fire that wiped out much of the village. Most of its books were saved, however, and it was soon operating again in temporary quarters. The library was designed by architect Willard M. Bacon and built 1916–17. Bacon was based in Boston, Massachusetts, but summered at nearby Crystal Lake. Its Colonial Revival design was the first of that style in the county; most of the libraries built in subsequent years would also be Colonial Revival, marking a shift away from the Classical Revival that had previously dominated their designs.

== See also ==
- National Register of Historic Places listings in Belknap County, New Hampshire
