= First Baptist Church of Gilmanton =

Historic church in New Hampshire, United States

- U.S. National Register of Historic Places
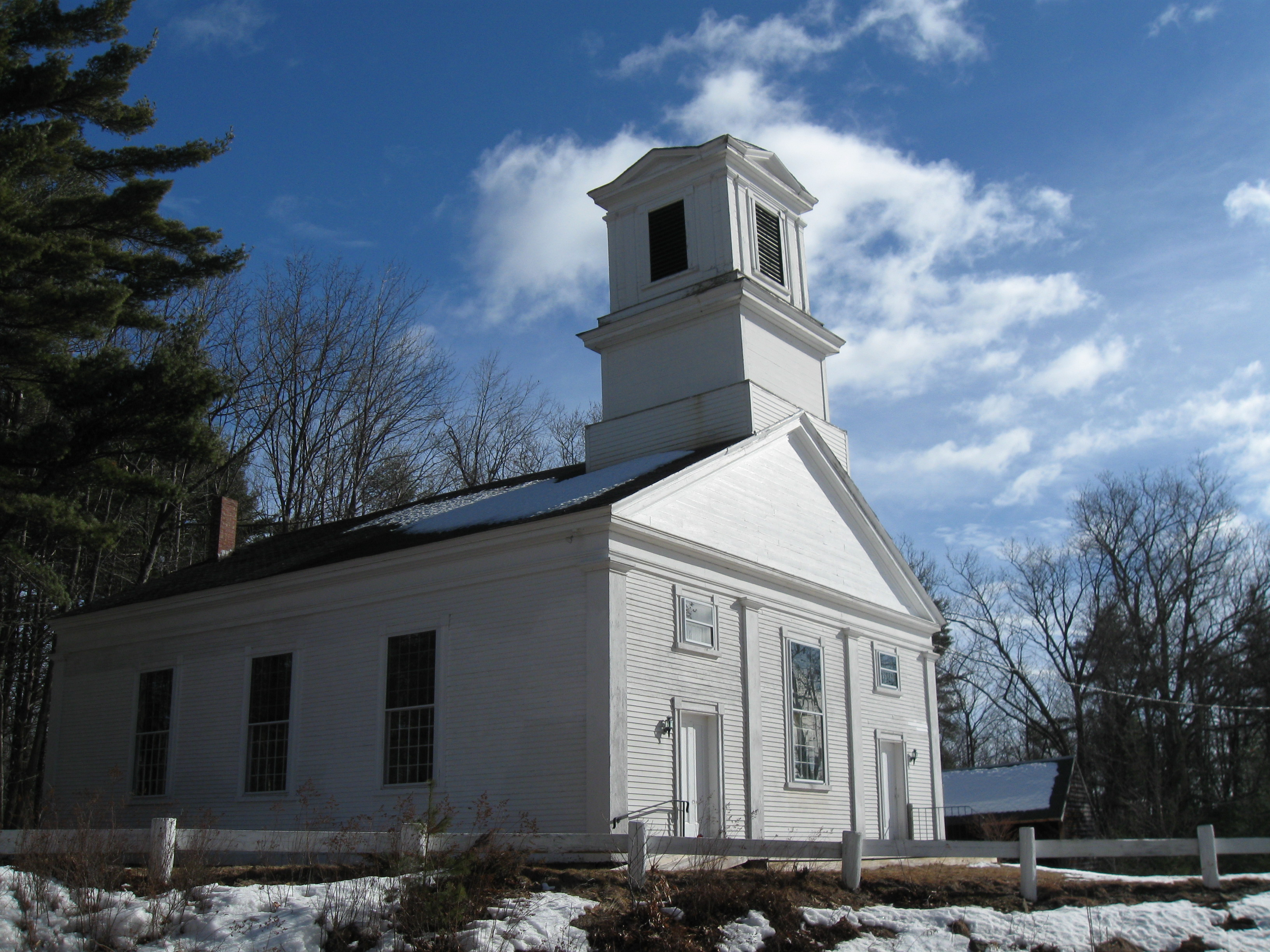

- Location within New Hampshire Location within the United States
- Location: Province Rd. (NH 107), .25 mi. N of Stage Rd., Gilmanton, New Hampshire
- Coordinates: 43°22′51″N 71°21′14″W
- Area: 0.5 acres (0.20 ha)
- Built: 1842
- Architectural style: Greek Revival
- NRHP reference No.: 89002059
- Added to NRHP: December 01, 1989

The First Baptist Church of Gilmanton, also known as the Lower Gilmanton Church, is a historic church building on Province Road (New Hampshire Route 107), slightly north of Stage Road, in Gilmanton, New Hampshire. Built in 1842, the church is one of Belknap County's finest Greek Revival churches, and is accompanied by the county's most intact 19th-century horse sheds. The property was listed on the National Register of Historic Places in 1989.

== Description and history ==
The First Baptist Church of Gilmanton is located in a rural setting on the east side of Province Road, several hundred feet north of its junction with Stage Road. The rectangular building presents a two-story main (southwestern) facade, although its main hall occupies the building's full height. Although the main body of the building is clapboarded, the gable end of the main facade is flushboarded. The building has wide corner pilasters, and an elaborate cornice with mouldings, frieze, and architrave on three sides. A two-stage bell tower rises above the main facade. On the property stand a series of horse sheds, a long single-story frame structure built partially on a stone foundation; these date to the 1880s.

Gilmanton's first Baptist congregation was organized in 1773, with its first meetinghouse built on the Lower Gilmanton militia training field the following year. It was moved (sometime before 1788) onto the parcel where this building stands. That building was replaced by the present one in 1842, due to its poor condition. It has undergone only relatively modest alterations, including the introduction of electricity in the 1940s, and the louvering of the belfry, after a bell was installed in it (some sixty years after the building's construction).

Belknap County has twelve surviving churches that were built during the Greek Revival period of the mid-19th century. Most of these have been altered, sometimes substantially. This church is one of the finest of these survivors, and is accompanied by a horse shed row of unparalleled quality in the county.

== See also ==
- National Register of Historic Places listings in Belknap County, New Hampshire
