= First Congregational Church (Alton, New Hampshire) =

Historic church in New Hampshire, United States

- U.S. National Register of Historic Places
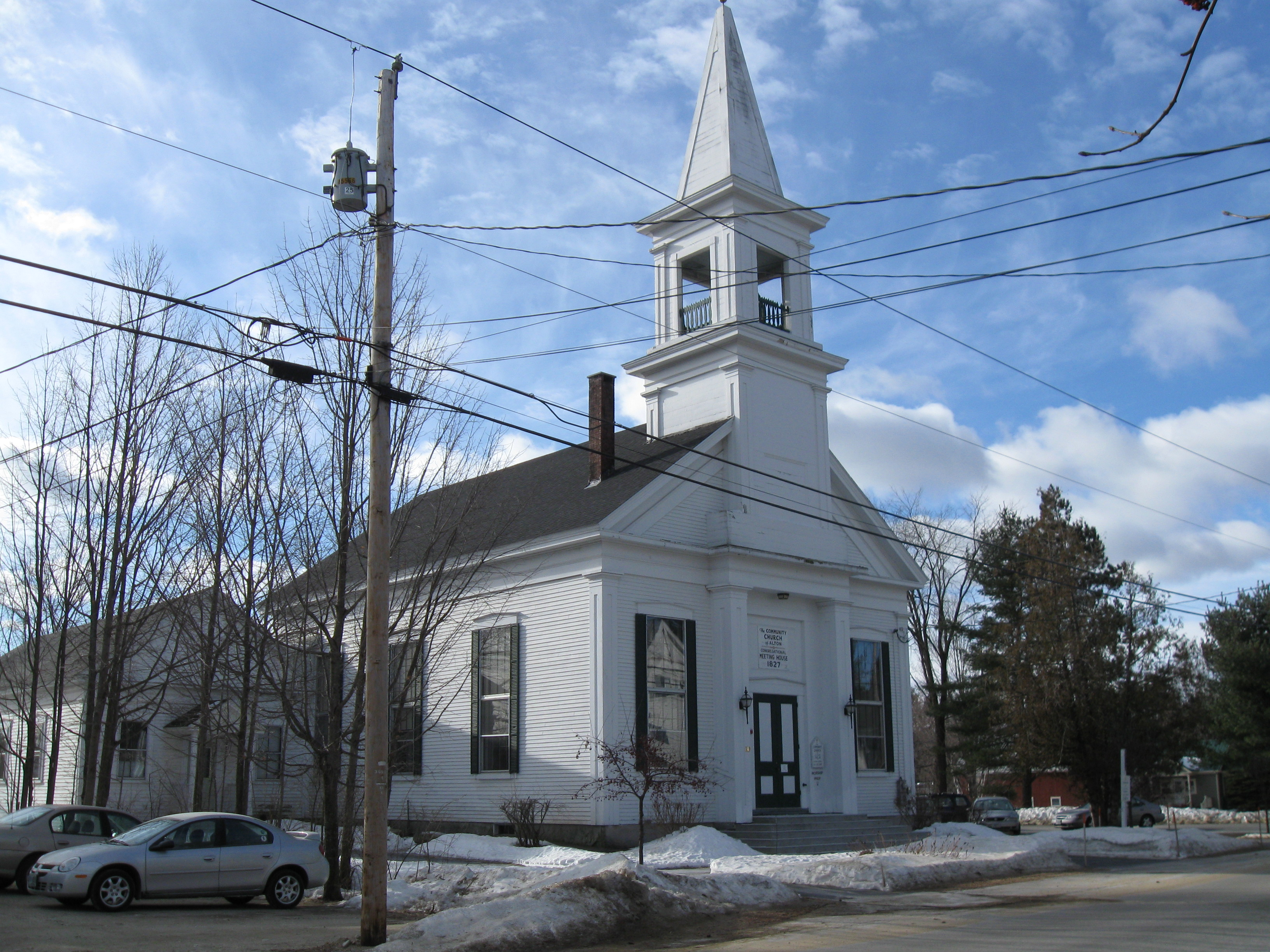

- Location within New Hampshire Location within the United States
- Location: Church St, W of Main St., Alton, New Hampshire, USA
- Coordinates: 43°27′17″N 71°13′20″W
- Area: 0.3 acres (0.12 ha)
- Built: 1853
- Architectural style: Greek Revival
- NRHP reference No.: 90000386
- Added to NRHP: March 09, 1990

The First Congregational Church (once known as the Congregational Meetinghouse and now the Community Church of Alton) is a historic church building at 20 Church Street in Alton, New Hampshire, United States. Built in 1853–54, it is one of Belknap County's finest Greek Revival churches. The building was listed on the National Register of Historic Places in 1990.

== Architecture and history ==
The Alton Community Church is located in Alton's main village, on the south side of Church Street west of Main Street. It is a 1 1/2-story wood-frame structure, with a gabled roof and clapboarded exterior. The main entry projects slightly, allowing for the presence of paneled columns, which support the church tower. These columns are matched by pilasters at the building's corners. The tower's first stage is paneled, while the second has an open belfry with square posts at the corners and balustrades in between. The belfry is topped by a cornice and four-sided spire. The interior of the main auditorium has been repeatedly altered since its original construction, with gallery spaces converted to storage. The basement level has been adapted to house classrooms, necessitating the addition of a stairwell in the vestibule area. Significant exterior alterations include the removal of a parapet around the tower spire, the addition of a stained glass window in the rear gable, and the construction of an adjoining vestry.

The church was built for a congregation established in 1827, that is now known as the Community Church of Alton. It was built in 1853–54, and is one of twelve surviving Greek Revival buildings in the county. Of those, it has one of the more high-style exteriors.

== See also ==
- National Register of Historic Places listings in Belknap County, New Hampshire
