= Second Free Baptist Church =

Historic church in New Hampshire, United States

- U.S. National Register of Historic Places
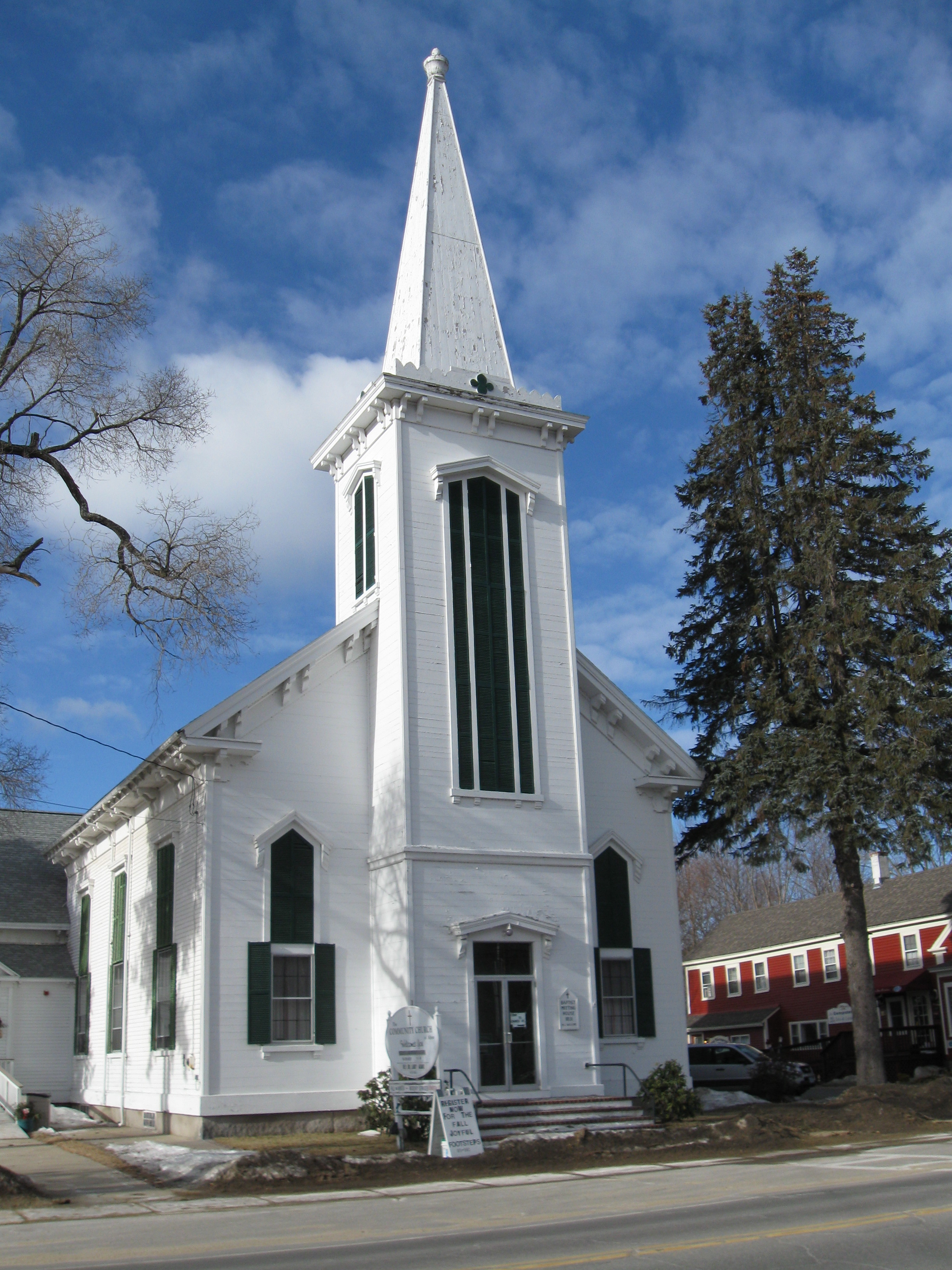

- Location within New Hampshire Location within the United States
- Location: Main St., S of Church St., Alton, New Hampshire
- Coordinates: 43°27′18″N 71°13′14″W
- Area: 0.2 acres (0.081 ha)
- Built: 1853
- Architectural style: Italianate
- NRHP reference No.: 90000387
- Added to NRHP: March 09, 1990

The Second Free Baptist Church is a historic church building on Main Street, south of Church Street in Alton, New Hampshire, United States. It is a wood-frame structure, built in 1853–54, and is the oldest extant Italianate church in Belknap County, with a little-altered exterior. The building was listed on the National Register of Historic Places in 1990.

== Architecture and history ==
Alton's Second Free Baptist Church is located in the center of its main village, on the west side of Main Street just south of Church Street. It is a wood-frame structure, with a gabled roof, flushboarded front facade, and clapboarded sides and rear. A square tower projects slightly at the center of the front facade, rising to a square pyramidal spire with a finial at the top. It has the main entrance at its base, set under a peaked and bracketed cornice. Most of the tower is taken up by a tall second stage, which has a tall three-part window topped by a similar peak, and finished with a cornice studded with paired brackets. The tower is flanked on the front facade by windows with peaked tops. The front gable and side eaves are studded with paired brackets.

The church was built in 1853-54 for a Free Will Baptist congregation organized in Alton in 1831. In 1838 this congregation joined with local Congregationalists to build a union church for use by both groups. In 1853 the Congregationalists decided to build their own church, and the Free Will Baptists soon followed suit. Although its interior has seen some alteration to later Victorian styles, the building's exterior has seen few alterations since its construction.

== See also ==
- National Register of Historic Places listings in Belknap County, New Hampshire
