= U.S. Post Office-Laconia Main =

- U.S. National Register of Historic Places
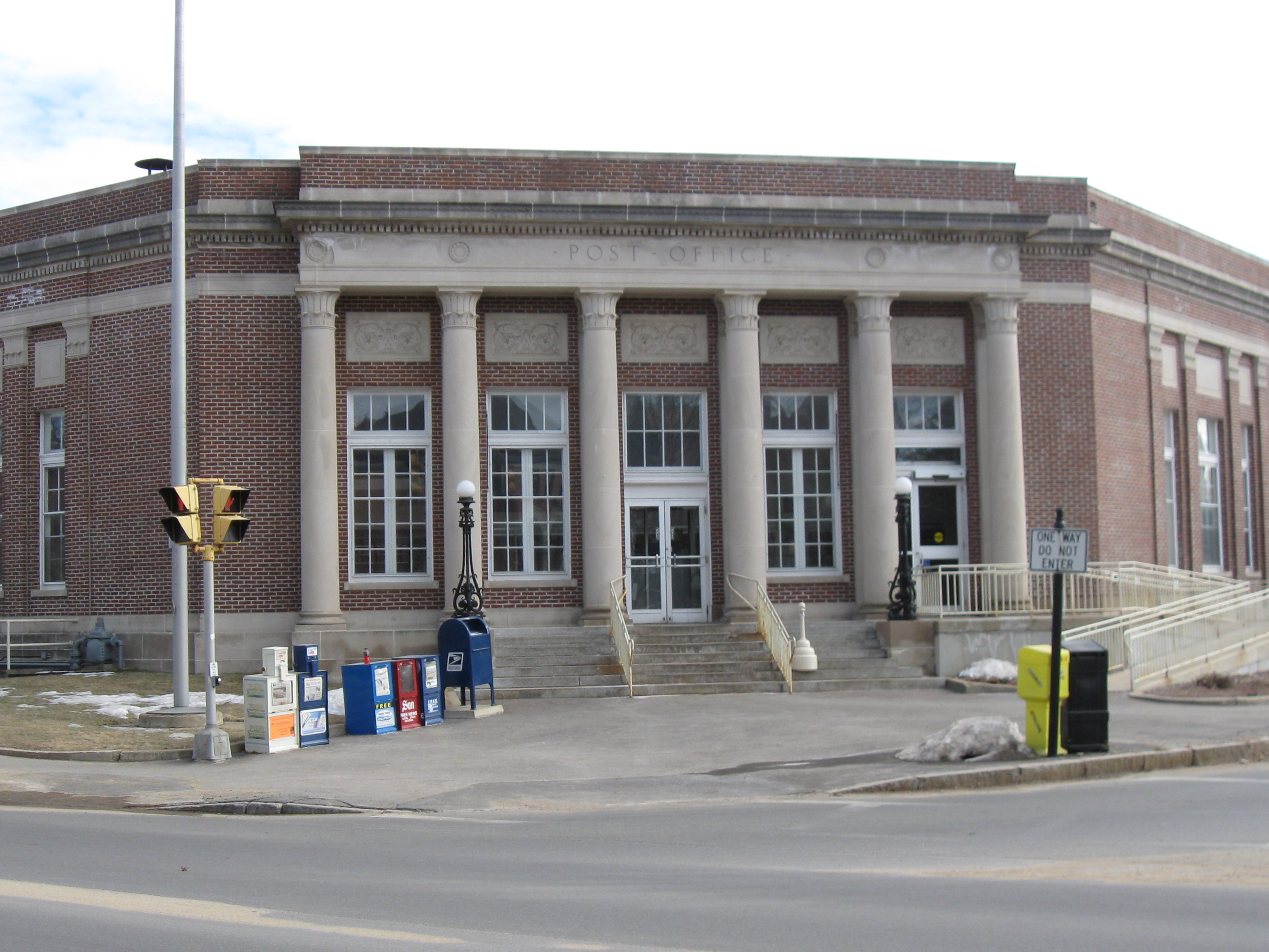

- Location within New Hampshire Location within the United States
- Location: 33 Church St., Laconia, New Hampshire
- Coordinates: 43°31′47″N 71°28′10″W
- Area: 0.7 acres (0.28 ha)
- Built: 1917
- Architect: Office of the Supervising Architect under James A. Wetmore
- Architectural style: Beaux Arts
- NRHP reference No.: 86002252
- Added to NRHP: July 18, 1986

The U.S. Post Office-Laconia Main is a historic post office building at 33 Church Street in Laconia, New Hampshire. Occupying a prominent corner site near the city's central business district, it was built in 1916-17 and is a prominent regional example of Beaux Arts architecture. The building was listed on the National Register of Historic Places in 1986.

== Description and history ==
Laconia's main post office is located on the northeast side of its downtown area, at the southeast corner of Church and Beacon streets. It is a single-story masonry structure, built of brick with stone trim. Its main entrance is located on the corner diagonal, and features a colonnade of six Corinthian columns in front of matching pilasters. The stairs leading to the main entry are flanked by wrought iron lamp posts with globular lights. The entrance, now modernized doors, is flanked by paired casement windows with transom windows and decorative carved panels above. The building is topped by a parapet with a dentillated cornice that extends around the building. The side elevations have three windows each, articulated by brick pilasters and topped by decorative carved stone panels. The interior lobby, although it has been modernized, features murals depicting the area's natural beauty, painted by Loran Percy in 1980 and 1982.

The building was constructed in 1916-17, its design provided by the Office of the Supervising Architect of the United States Department of the Treasury, then headed by James A. Wetmore.

== See also ==
- National Register of Historic Places listings in Belknap County, New Hampshire
