= Tilton Downtown Historic District =

Historic district in New Hampshire, United States

- U.S. National Register of Historic Places
- U.S. Historic district
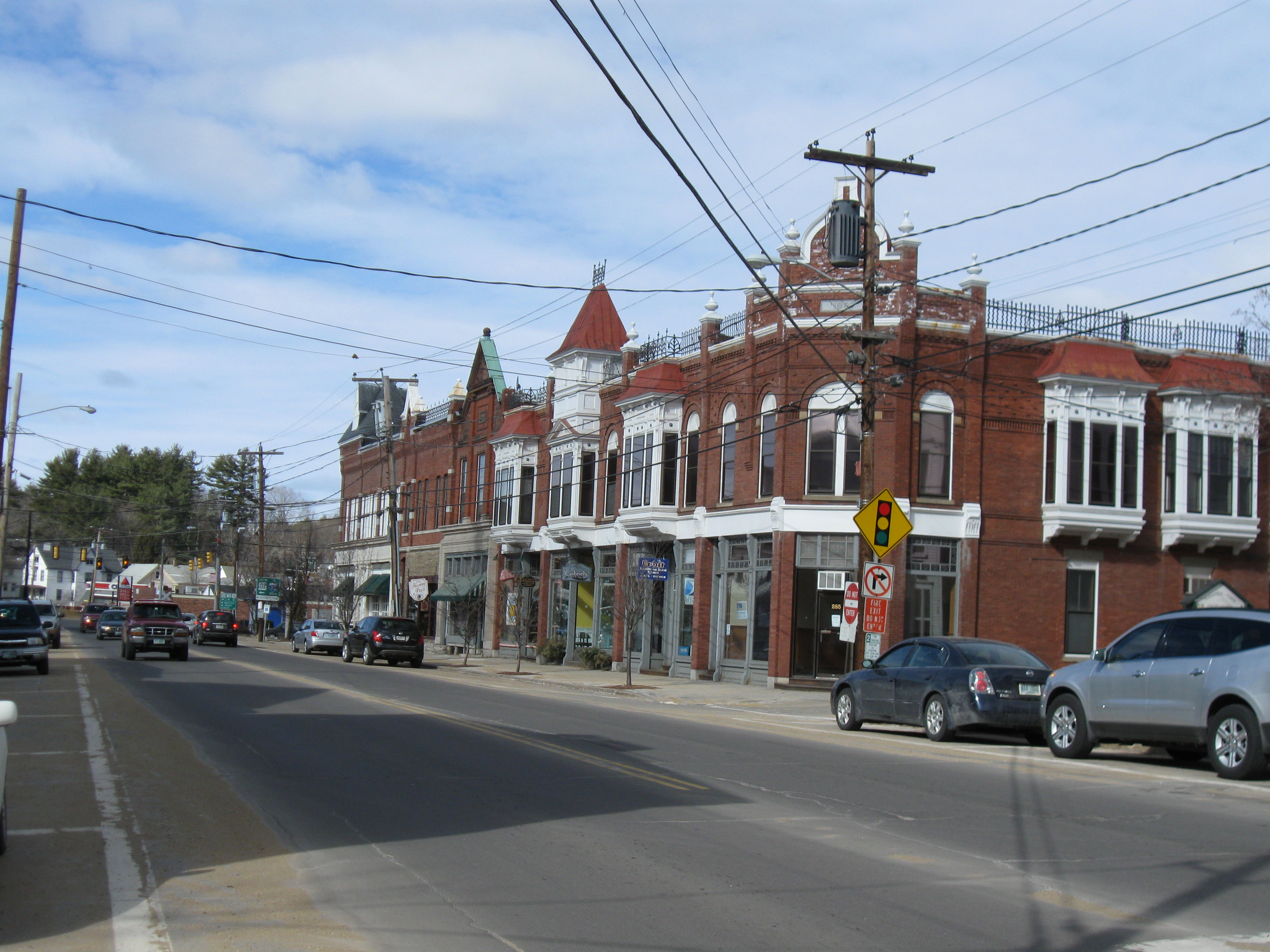

- Location within New Hampshire Location within the United States
- Location: Roughly Main St. between Central and Bridge Sts., Tilton, New Hampshire
- Coordinates: 43°26′34″N 71°35′25″W
- Area: 3.4 acres (1.4 ha)
- Architect: Multiple
- Architectural style: Mixed (more Than 2 Styles From Different Periods), Late Victorian
- NRHP reference No.: 83001128
- Added to NRHP: July 7, 1983

The Tilton Downtown Historic District encompasses a roughly one-block section of Main Street (United States Route 3) in the center of Tilton, New Hampshire. It extends from Central Street in the west to Bridge and School Streets in the east, including all of the buildings on the north side of this section, and a cluster of buildings on the south side near Bridge Street. The area has long been a commercial and industrial center for the town, although most of the buildings now date from the late 19th century onward, and include a fine array of Victorian architecture. The district was listed on the National Register of Historic Places in 1983.

== Description and history ==
The area that is now Tilton was part of a colonial land grant made in 1748 and first settled in 1764 as part of Sanbornton. The first bridge in the area over the Winnipesaukee River was built near the site of Tilton's Bridge Street bridge in 1763, and the first sawmill and gristmill opened on the river in 1765-66. The area between the bridge and the mills became what is now Tilton's Main Street. A store was opened near the bridge in 1798, and it is home to Tilton's first church, the 1838 Greek and Gothic Revival Northfield-Tilton Congregational Church, which still stands and is the district's oldest building. The village's growing economic independence prompted its eventual separation from Sanbornton in 1869.

The district includes a single block of Main Street, which runs roughly east–west, parallel to the Winnipesaukee River. Its eastern boundary is the junction with Bridge Street, where there are two memorials to the town's war dead. It extends westward on the north side of Main Street about 2/3 of the way to Prospect Street, and for a shorter distance on the south side. Prominent buildings include Tilton's town hall, built in 1879-80 as a gift by the town's major benefactor, Charles E. Tilton. It was probably designed by Edward Dow, who also designed the 1872-73 Trinity Episcopal Church, a fine example of stone Gothic architecture.

== See also ==
- National Register of Historic Places listings in Belknap County, New Hampshire
