= Laconia District Court =

- U.S. National Register of Historic Places
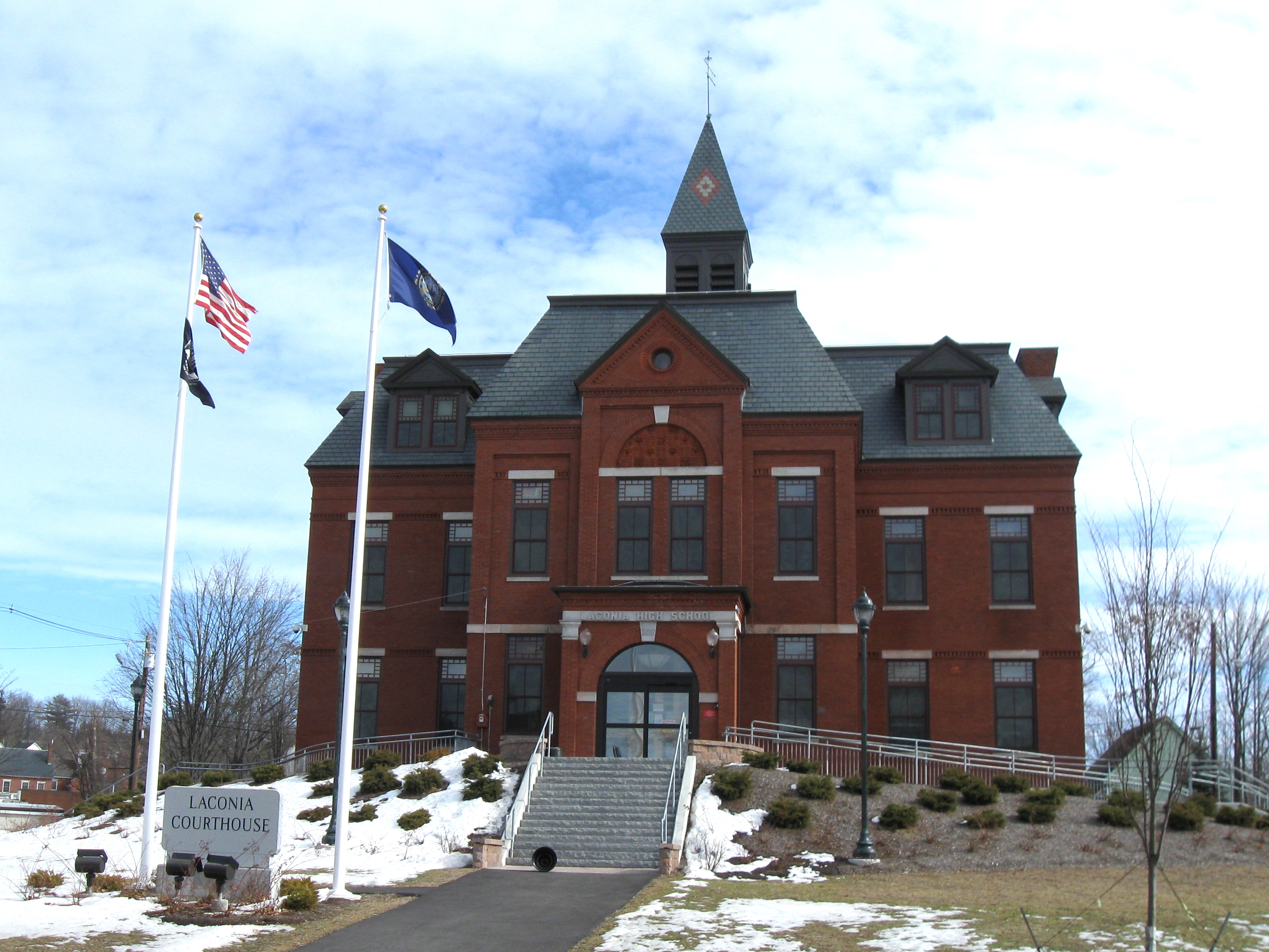

- Location within New Hampshire Location within the United States
- Location: Academy Sq., Laconia, New Hampshire
- Coordinates: 43°31′25″N 71°28′11″W
- Area: 0.7 acres (0.28 ha)
- Built: 1886
- Architect: Frederick N. Footman
- Architectural style: Second Empire
- NRHP reference No.: 82004990
- Added to NRHP: November 9, 1982

The Laconia District Court is located at 26 Academy Street (Academy Square) in Laconia, New Hampshire, in a Second Empire brick structure which was built by the city in 1886-87 to house its high school. It was designed by Frederick N. Footman of Boston, though preliminary designs had been obtained from Dow & Wheeler of Concord, New Hampshire. The building was listed on the National Register of Historic Places in 1982.

== Description and history ==
The Laconia District Court is located south of downtown Laconia, on the east side of Academy Street a short way south of Court Street. It is a 2-1/2 story masonry structure, with load-bearing brick walls with granite trim. It is topped by a tall mansard roof and a square belfry with pyramidal roof. The front facade is seven bays wide, with a stepped appearance. A three-bay section, continuing the mansard roof, projects at the center, and the main entrance pavilion, capped by a gabled roof, projects from that. A stone stringcourse separates the first and second floors of the central section, and its second-floor windows are set in recessed panels. The entrance is in a wide round-arch opening, and the bay above has two sash windows, with a recessed decorative half-round panel above.

Laconia's first high school used the old building of the Gilford Academy, and was by the mid-1880s overcrowded. The present building was completed in 1887. It housed the city's high school students as well as the local district elementary school. It was used by the city as a high school until 1922, and then as the Academy Elementary School until 1975. The building received a major rehabilitation in 1977 and was converted for use as a courthouse at that time.

== See also ==
- National Register of Historic Places listings in Belknap County, New Hampshire
