= Monument Square Historic District (Alton, New Hampshire) =

Historic district in New Hampshire, United States

- U.S. National Register of Historic Places
- U.S. Historic district
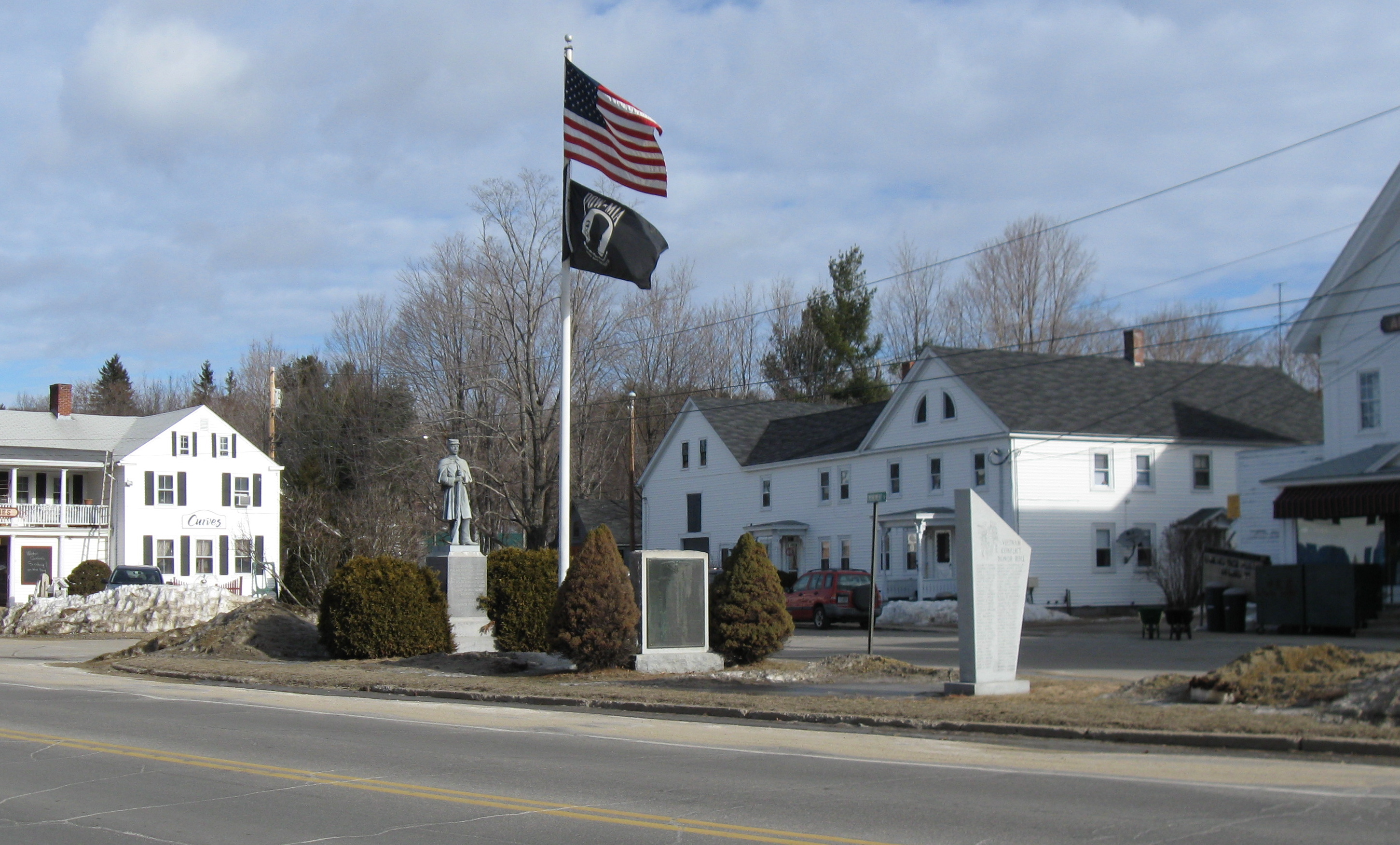

- Location within New Hampshire Location within the United States
- Location: Main, Factory, Church, and Depot Sts., Alton, New Hampshire
- Coordinates: 43°27′3″N 71°12′41″W
- Area: 3.5 acres (1.4 ha)
- Built: 1830
- Architectural style: Greek Revival
- NRHP reference No.: 84002512
- Added to NRHP: March 15, 1984

The Monument Square Historic District of Alton, New Hampshire, encompasses the 19th-century heart of the town, a roughly triangular open space formed by the junction of Main Street (New Hampshire Route 11) and Old Wolfeboro Road between Factory Street and Church Street. It is notable for its well-preserved 19th-century buildings, and for its relatively uncommon shape, born out of the area's origin as a major road junction. The district was listed on the National Register of Historic Places in 1984.

== Description and history ==
In 1722, the legislature of the Province of New Hampshire ordered the construction of a road between Dover and the Lakes Region west of Lake Winnipesaukee. Alton's downtown Main Street follows the route of that road. The Wolfeboro Road was also an 18th-century road, built to provide access to Wolfeboro on the east side of the lake. These two roads met at an acute angle, which developed in the 19th century to become Alton's town center. Early development took place south of this junction, but the area became important in 1830 with the construction of the Cocheco Hotel, which stands at the northern end of the district. The advent of railroad service to the village brought further changes, including the rerouting of the Wolfeboro Road away to the north. The town, however, decided in 1893 to build its Romanesque town hall on the east side of the former Wolfeboro Road alignment, and subsequent development has included the construction of the Colonial Revival Gilman Museum.

The district is bounded on the north by the former Cocheco Hotel (now housing other businesses) and Factory Street (New Hampshire Route 140), and is bounded on the south by Depot and Church Streets. The triangular "square" is mostly paved, with small triangular grassy areas on which monuments to the town's military service members are located. There are eleven buildings in the district, most of which face toward the square. In addition to the town hall, hotel, and museum, there are a few residences and three commercial buildings. The Greek Revival White Lodge, built in the 1850s, is one of Alton's finest period residences.

== See also ==
- National Register of Historic Places listings in Belknap County, New Hampshire
