= First Free Will Baptist Church in Meredith =

Historic church in New Hampshire, United States

- U.S. National Register of Historic Places
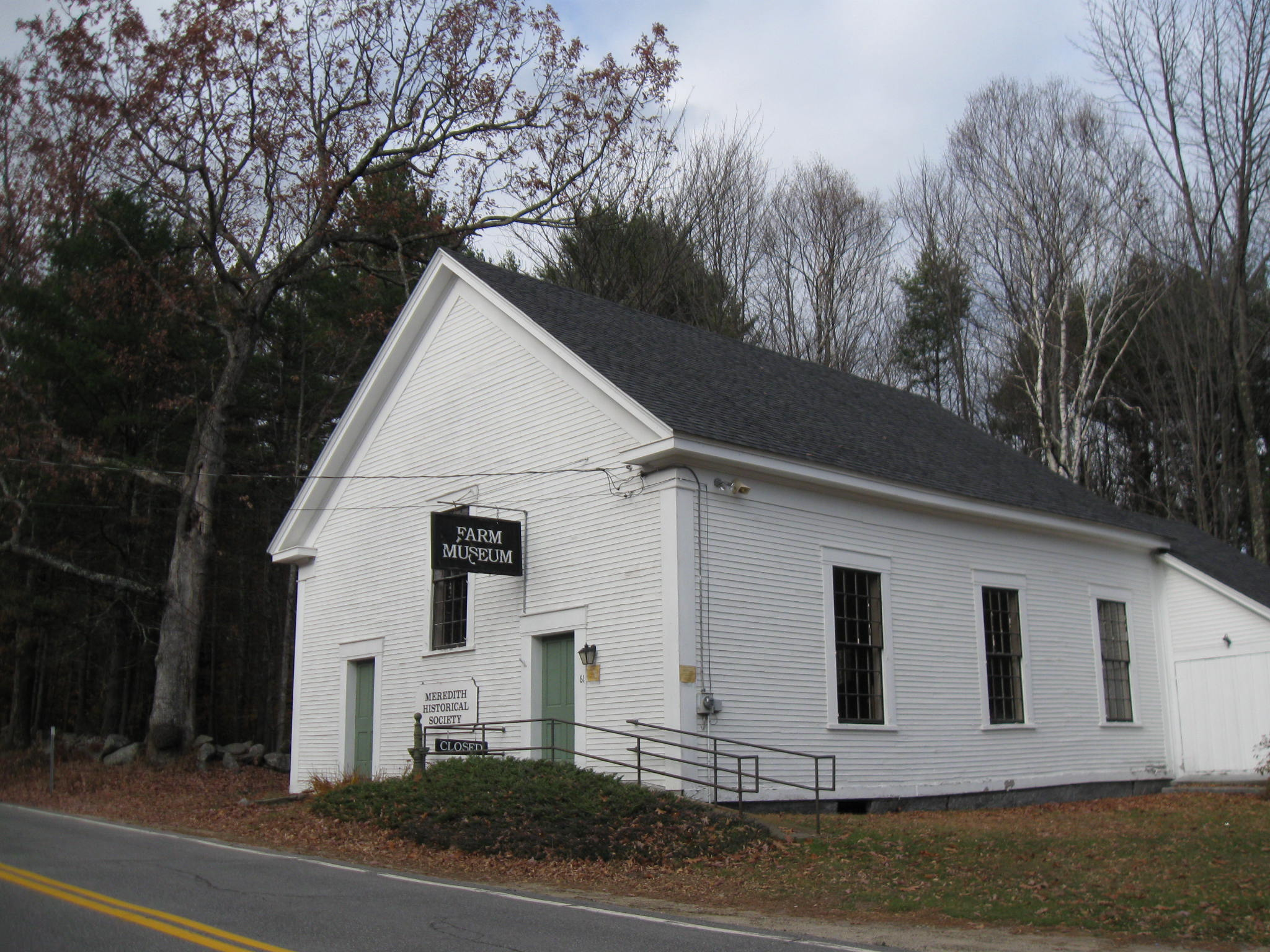

- Location within New Hampshire Location within the United States
- Location: 61 Winona Rd., Meredith, New Hampshire
- Coordinates: 43°38′48″N 71°32′15″W
- Area: 0.2 acres (0.081 ha)
- Built: c. 1802
- Architectural style: Greek Revival
- NRHP reference No.: 86003368
- Added to NRHP: December 01, 1986

The First Free Will Baptist Church in Meredith is a historic church building at 61 Winona Road in Meredith, New Hampshire, United States. Built about 1802 and remodeled in 1848, it is a good example of a mid-19th century vernacular Greek Revival rural church. It is now a museum called the Pottle Meeting House, managed by the local historical society. The building was listed on the National Register of Historic Places in 1986.

== Description and history ==
The First Free Will Baptist Church in Meredith is located in a rural setting of central Meredith, on the east side of Winona Road about .6 miles (0.97 km) north of its junction with New Hampshire Route 104. It is a single-story rectangular wood-frame structure, with a small ell attached to its northern end, and a shed-roof privy attached to the ell. Greek Revival elements include wide cornerboards, and an entablature that extends under the gable returns. The main facade is plain except for two symmetrically placed entrances, and each side has three sash windows. The interior is mainly taken up by the auditorium, with a pair of shallow vestibules flanking the choir loft at the rear.

The Free Will Baptist congregation in Meredith's Oak Hill section first met in 1800. Within two years it had grown to 134 people, including some from adjacent towns. Since the congregation's early records have not survived, the exact construction date of this building is unknown. Its existence is suggested in a lease of the land dated 1802. Its present appearance appears to be almost entirely due to later alterations, primarily those in 1848 giving the main block its present Greek Revival appearance. The ell, which originally served as a vestry, was added in either 1890 or 1909. The building served as a church until 1946, and was purchased by the newly formed Meredith Historical Society in 1950, which adapted it for use as a museum. Exhibits include early tools and farming artifacts.

The building was listed on the National Register of Historic Places in 1986.

== See also ==
- National Register of Historic Places listings in Belknap County, New Hampshire
