= Aquadoctan =

Archaeological site in New Hampshire, US

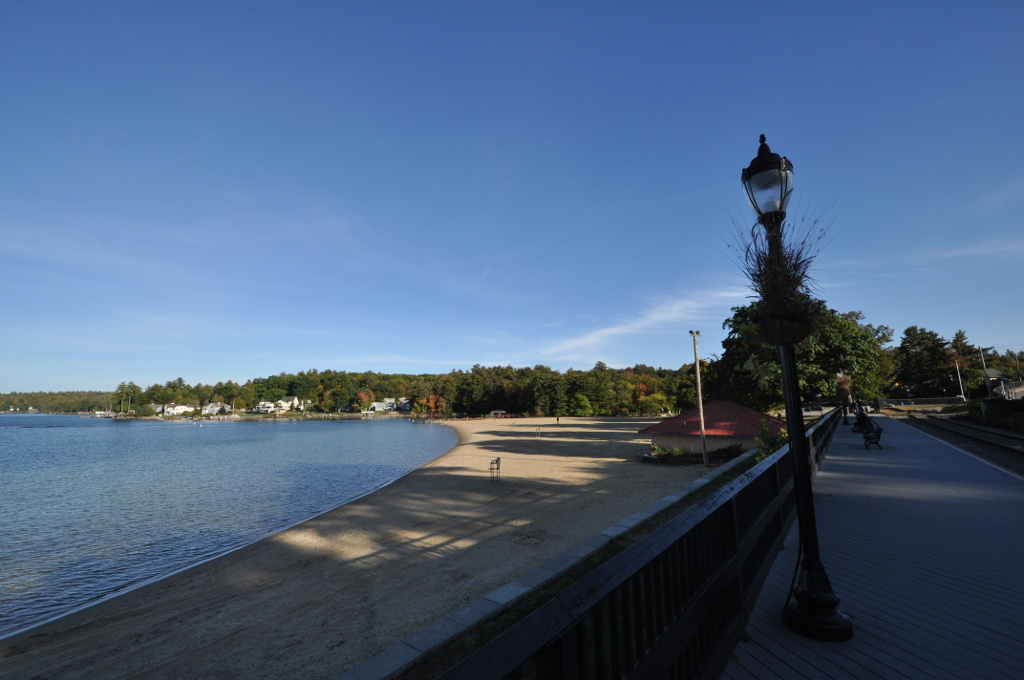
- View of the beach at Weirs Beach, looking east toward the outlet of Lake Winnipesaukee

- Location in New Hampshire
- 43°36′16″N 71°27′21″W
- Cultures: Abenaki (Pennacook)
- Location: Weirs Beach, New Hampshire, US
- Region: Lakes Region (New Hampshire)

History
- Built: c. 9,000 BCE

Site notes
- Area: 15 acres (6.1 ha)
- Excavation dates: 1970s

U.S. National Register of Historic Places
- Official name: The Weirs
- Designated: May 12, 1975
- Reference no.: 75000120

Aquadoctan was one of the largest known Native American villages in what is now the U.S. state of New Hampshire. In an area commonly known today as The Weirs (for the semi-permanent fishing weirs the Natives had built on the river), the village lay on the north bank of the Winnipesaukee River at the outlet of Lake Winnipesaukee in the Lakes Region of New Hampshire. The site is now in Weirs Beach, a summer resort and village of the city of Laconia. The Native American village, whose archaeological remains extend for a half mile along the river and a quarter mile along the lake, has been documented through archaeological investigation to have evidence of settlement from 9,000 BCE to the late seventeenth century. Colonial reports document that the site was abandoned substantially in 1696, when most of New Hampshire's remaining native population withdrew to join the Pequawket at present-day Fryeburg, Maine.

Due to documentation of its use for human settlements, the area has long been of archaeological interest. Portions of the area were investigated formally during 1976 through 1979 by a team from the University of New Hampshire, and in 1977 by Howard Sargent, long a leading figure in New Hampshire archaeology, who is noted for his identification of the Hunter Archeological Site that also is in New Hampshire.

Finds at the Aquadoctan site yield evidence of habitation back to the Paleo-Indian period (c. 7600 BCE). These finds were located under Middle Archaic remains, indicating a long period of occupation. The site was one of the first in northern New England to yield evidence of human activity in that prehistoric time period.

A 15-acre (6.1 ha) section of the village site was listed on the National Register of Historic Places in 1975.

== See also ==
- Endicott Rock, a state park in the area
- Beaver Meadow Brook Archeological Site
- National Register of Historic Places listings in Belknap County, New Hampshire
