= Busiel-Seeburg Mill =

- U.S. National Register of Historic Places
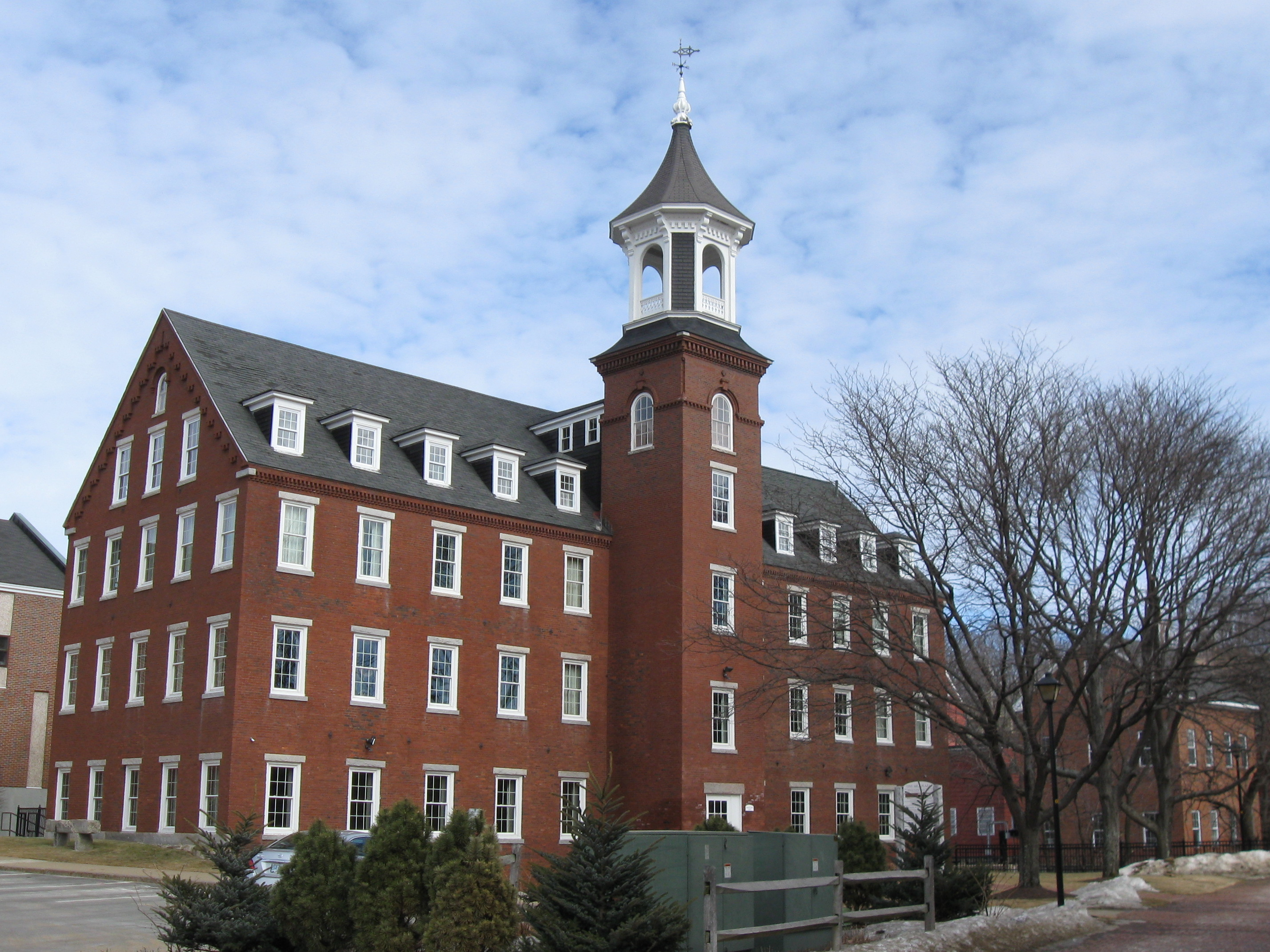

- Location within New Hampshire Location within the United States
- Location: 1 Mill Plaza, Laconia, New Hampshire
- Coordinates: 43°31′41″N 71°28′5″W
- Area: 1.2 acres (0.49 ha)
- Built: 1853
- NRHP reference No.: 71000047
- Added to NRHP: January 25, 1971

The Busiel-Seeburg Mill is a historic mill building in Laconia, New Hampshire, since converted into an office building known as 1 Mill Plaza. This 3 1/2-story brick structure achieved its present configuration in stages, beginning in 1853, and successively altered and expanded through the rest of the 19th century. The business, established by John W. Busiel in 1846, manufactured knitted hosiery, and was one of the first producers of knitwear to use circular knitting machines invented by Aiken and Peppers. The building was listed on the National Register of Historic Places in 1971.

== Description and history ==
The Busiel-Seeburg Mill is located on the east side of downtown Laconia, between Beacon Street East and the Winnipesaukee River, which historically provided the mill's power. It is set between Laconia City Hall and the Belknap-Sulloway Mill, another 19th-century mill building. The Busiel-Seeburg Mill is 3 1/2 stories in height, and is built out of red brick with a gabled roof. The main facade is nine bays wide, with a central projecting square stair tower, capped by an octagonal belfry with flared roof. Ornament is limited to brick corbelling along the cornices and gable edges, and on the upper levels of the tower, where there are also round-arch windows. Shed-roof dormers pierce the roof.

The mill was built in stages beginning in 1853, when the eastern portion (closest to the river) was built. Its construction is a contrast to the older Belknap-Sulloway Mill, in that it uses more fire-retardant construction methods, and that it represents several different stages of mill evolution through its repeated enlargement. The mill was founded by John Busiel (father of Governor of New Hampshire Charles A. Busiel) and produced knitted hosiery garments. It was one of the first area mills to use innovative circular knitting machines, and its success spurred the growth in the area of business that manufactured knitting needles.

== See also ==
- National Register of Historic Places listings in Belknap County, New Hampshire
- New Hampshire Historical Marker No. 135: The Belknap Mill - The Busiel Mill
