= First Freewill Baptist Church (East Alton, New Hampshire) =

Historic church in New Hampshire, United States

- U.S. National Register of Historic Places
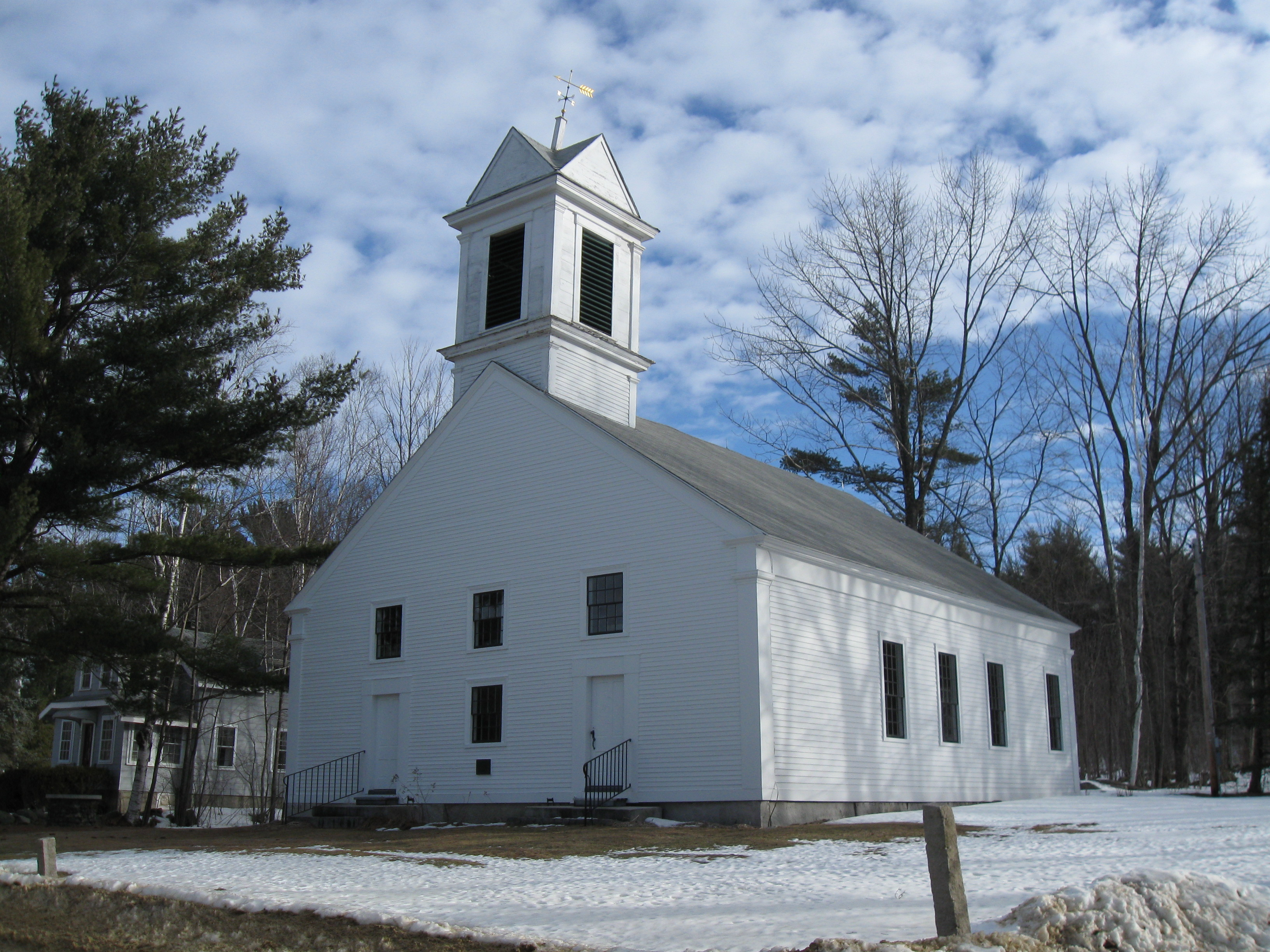

- Location within New Hampshire Location within the United States
- Location: Drew Hill Rd., East Alton, New Hampshire
- Coordinates: 43°31′9″N 71°12′0″W
- Area: 0.3 acres (0.12 ha)
- Built: 1826
- Architectural style: Greek Revival
- NRHP reference No.: 78000209
- Added to NRHP: August 2, 1978

The First Freewill Baptist Church is a historic Free Will Baptist church building on Drew Hill Road north of Gilman's Corner Road in East Alton, New Hampshire. Built in 1826, and essentially unaltered since about 1847, it is a well-preserved example of a rural mid-19th century church. The building was listed on the National Register of Historic Places in 1978.

== Description and history ==
The First Freewill Baptist Church is located in what is now a rural setting at the geographic center of Alton, on the east side of Drew Hill Road near its junction with Gilman's Corner Road. It is a single-story wood-frame structure, with a gabled roof, clapboarded exterior, and stone foundation. Its Greek Revival features include corner pilasters and an entablature, features which are repeated on the first stage of the bell tower, which houses the original period bell. The interior retains many original features, including gas light fixtures and wall sconces. Walls are finished at the lower level with wainscoting, which terminates in a simple chair rail. A simple pulpit is set against the rear wall. The bulk of the main chamber is taken up by bench pews, from which the doors were removed c. 1847.

The church was in consistent use until 1860, after which many congregants moved to the Baptist church in the present town center. This area became less important after the 1885 arrival of the railroad at Alton Bay, bypassing the old center. A community organization was formed to maintain the building in 1920. It is one of the only buildings to survive from the original town center.

== See also ==
- National Register of Historic Places listings in Belknap County, New Hampshire
