= Lakeport, New Hampshire =

Unincorporated community in New Hampshire, United States

- Neighborhood
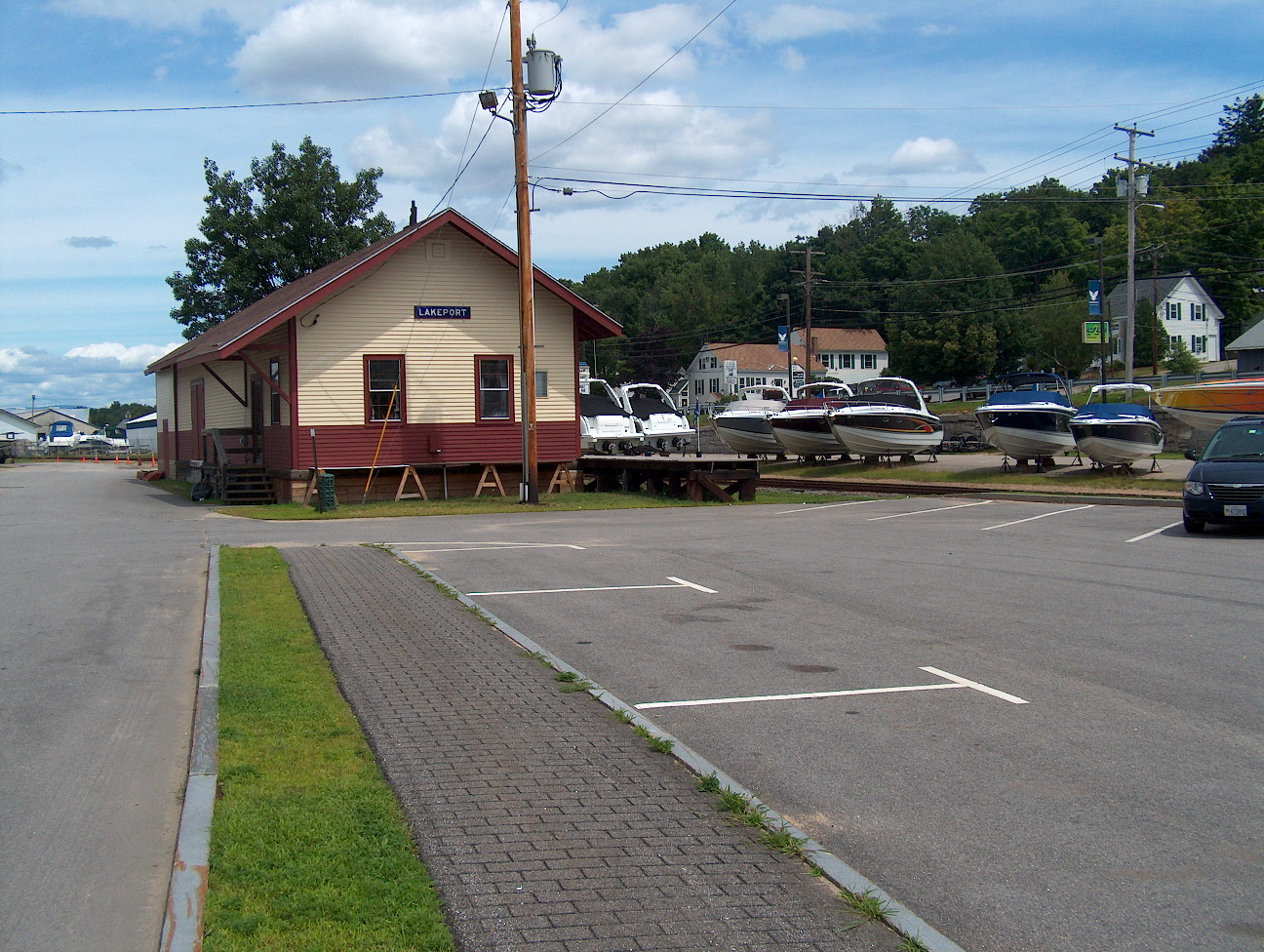
- Lakeport railroad station, 2008

- Location within New Hampshire Location within the United States
- Coordinates: 43°32′50″N 71°27′45″W
- Country: United States
- State: New Hampshire
- County: Belknap
- City: Laconia
- Elevation: 512 ft (156 m)
- Time zone: UTC-5 (Eastern (EST))
  - Summer (DST): UTC-4 (EDT)
- ZIP Codes: 03246, 03247 (Laconia)
- Area code: 603
- GNIS feature ID: 867926

Lakeport is a neighborhood in the city of Laconia in Belknap County, New Hampshire, United States. It was once known as Lake Village and is centered on a power dam on the short river channel between Paugus Bay (an arm of Lake Winnipesaukee) to the north, and Opechee Bay to the south. Lakeport lies approximately 1.5 miles (2.4 km) north of downtown Laconia.

During the summer months, the Lakeport train station is the southern destination of the Winnipesaukee Scenic Railroad. Trains are boarded at Weirs Beach or Meredith to the north.

Once a busy center for entertainment, the business area of Lakeport now consists of a couple of convenience stores, several restaurants, a large hotel on Opechee Bay, a small post office, and other small businesses. Over the past few years projects to revitalize the area have included redesign of the main intersection, replacement of the Lakeport Bridge, new plantings and foot bridges for pedestrians. Such projects have encouraged new business growth and investment including lodging, dining, and various other services.

There are two free public parks that have been rebuilt over the last couple of years and have new playground equipment. There are also several boat launches and marinas on the Paugus Bay side of Lakeport.

== Climate ==
According to the Köppen Climate Classification system, Lakeport has a warm-summer humid continental climate, abbreviated Dfb on climate maps.

Climate data for Lakeport, New Hampshire, 1991–2020 normals, extremes 1938–present
Month	Jan	Feb	Mar	Apr	May	Jun	Jul	Aug	Sep	Oct	Nov	Dec	Year
Record high °F (°C)	64 (18)	69 (21)	82 (28)	92 (33)	95 (35)	96 (36)	99 (37)	100 (38)	95 (35)	87 (31)	78 (26)	69 (21)	100 (38)
Mean maximum °F (°C)	50.4 (10.2)	52.8 (11.6)	62.5 (16.9)	77.7 (25.4)	86.8 (30.4)	90.9 (32.7)	92.9 (33.8)	91.0 (32.8)	87.4 (30.8)	76.3 (24.6)	65.6 (18.7)	54.1 (12.3)	94.4 (34.7)
Mean daily maximum °F (°C)	30.3 (−0.9)	33.7 (0.9)	42.5 (5.8)	55.6 (13.1)	68.0 (20.0)	76.6 (24.8)	82.1 (27.8)	80.8 (27.1)	73.3 (22.9)	60.1 (15.6)	47.3 (8.5)	36.2 (2.3)	57.2 (14.0)
Daily mean °F (°C)	21.0 (−6.1)	23.1 (−4.9)	31.8 (−0.1)	44.1 (6.7)	56.3 (13.5)	65.7 (18.7)	71.3 (21.8)	69.8 (21.0)	62.4 (16.9)	50.0 (10.0)	38.7 (3.7)	28.2 (−2.1)	46.9 (8.3)
Mean daily minimum °F (°C)	11.7 (−11.3)	12.5 (−10.8)	21.2 (−6.0)	32.7 (0.4)	44.5 (6.9)	54.8 (12.7)	60.4 (15.8)	58.7 (14.8)	51.5 (10.8)	39.9 (4.4)	30.0 (−1.1)	20.2 (−6.6)	36.5 (2.5)
Mean minimum °F (°C)	−5.8 (−21.0)	−3.3 (−19.6)	2.9 (−16.2)	22.9 (−5.1)	33.9 (1.1)	44.6 (7.0)	52.4 (11.3)	49.7 (9.8)	39.0 (3.9)	29.2 (−1.6)	17.6 (−8.0)	4.2 (−15.4)	−8.4 (−22.4)
Record low °F (°C)	−29 (−34)	−20 (−29)	−11 (−24)	10 (−12)	24 (−4)	37 (3)	44 (7)	38 (3)	30 (−1)	22 (−6)	4 (−16)	−19 (−28)	−29 (−34)
Average precipitation inches (mm)	3.08 (78)	2.88 (73)	3.39 (86)	3.65 (93)	3.47 (88)	4.44 (113)	4.61 (117)	3.89 (99)	3.77 (96)	4.83 (123)	3.68 (93)	3.92 (100)	45.61 (1,159)
Average snowfall inches (cm)	18.8 (48)	16.9 (43)	9.4 (24)	1.6 (4.1)	0.0 (0.0)	0.0 (0.0)	0.0 (0.0)	0.0 (0.0)	0.0 (0.0)	0.3 (0.76)	2.1 (5.3)	12.8 (33)	61.9 (158.16)
Average extreme snow depth inches (cm)	11.3 (29)	14.4 (37)	11.8 (30)	2.6 (6.6)	0.0 (0.0)	0.0 (0.0)	0.0 (0.0)	0.0 (0.0)	0.0 (0.0)	0.2 (0.51)	1.4 (3.6)	7.6 (19)	17.0 (43)
Average precipitation days (≥ 0.01 in)	11.7	9.2	10.8	11.2	12.1	12.6	11.4	10.0	9.8	11.2	10.7	11.6	132.3
Average snowy days (≥ 0.1 in)	7.4	6.0	4.0	0.8	0.0	0.0	0.0	0.0	0.0	0.1	1.0	4.9	24.2
Source 1: NOAA
Source 2: National Weather Service
