= Loudon Classic =

American annual motorcycle road racing competition

The Loudon Classic, originally named the Laconia Classic, is an annual motorcycle road racing competition held during the Laconia Motorcycle Week at the New Hampshire Motor Speedway in Loudon, New Hampshire. Founded in 1934 when it was originally sanctioned by the American Motorcyclist Association (AMA), the race is one of the oldest motorcycle competitions in the United States. The competition changed locations over the years, starting as a dirt track race before evolving into a road race. From the late 1930s until the early 2000s, the Loudon Classic was one of the most prestigious motorcycle races in the United States, second only to the Daytona 200.

== History ==
=== Rally beginnings ===
In the 1910s the New Hampshire Lakes Region became a popular riding destination for early motorcycle enthusiasts. Unlike the Sturgis Motorcycle Rally which originated as a motorcycle race, the Loudon Classic originated as a motorcycle rally. When motorcycle sales began to decline as a result of the introduction of the low cost Ford Model T, the American motorcycle industry body, the Federation of American Motorcyclists (FAM) sought to boost sales by sponsoring a series of Gypsy tours, so called because the participants camped in large gatherings like Romani people. The annual tour held at Weirs Beach in Laconia, New Hampshire on the southern shore of Lake Winnipesaukee, became the most popular of these tours due to its proximity to Boston, New York, Philadelphia and Montreal.

=== Dirt track roots ===
In 1933, the AMA introduced a new racing category called Class C which featured street-legal motorcycles in an effort to make motorcycle racing less expensive for ordinary motorcyclists. Street-legal motorcycles were known at the time as touring motorcycles hence, a tourist trophy (TT) signified a race classification for street-legal motorcycles. Informal motorcycle racing had occurred at previous Weirs Beach rallies however, the first race formally sanctioned by the American Motorcyclist Association (AMA), occurred in 1934 when, a 200-mile (320 km) dirt track TT race for Class C motorcycles was held on a 3.3 mile track in Swanzey, New Hampshire that used partially paved and unimproved gravel roads, up and down gently rolling hills. Local rider Babe Tancrede won the inaugural Laconia Classic riding a Harley-Davidson.

=== Belknap circuit ===
In 1937 the race moved to Old Orchard Beach, Maine where it was held as a 100-mile (160 km) event for only one year then, in 1938 it was moved to a 1.0-mile track in the Belknap Recreational Area, now known as the Gunstock Mountain Resort near Laconia, New Hampshire. The Belknap circuit featured crudely paved roads as well as improved gravel roads. Although the event became known as the Laconia Classic, the Belknap Recreational Area was located in nearby Gilford, New Hampshire. An integral promoter responsible for bringing the race to Belknap was Fritzie Baer, an Indian motorcycle dealer from Springfield, Massachusetts who would promote the race until 1963.

Along with the move to Belknap, the event was accredited national championship status by the AMA in 1938. Indian rider Ed Kretz, who had won the inaugural Daytona 200 in 1937, won the first 200-mile (320 km) national championship race held at Belknap in 1938. His victory marked the only 200 mile Laconia Classic as, the race distance was reduced to 100 miles in 1939. In 1940, the circuit was converted from dirt and gravel to a fully paved course and, the AMA changed the race classification from a TT national to a road race national.

Dick Klamfoth's 1951 Laconia Classic victory on a Norton marked the first win by a foreign manufacturer. Harley-Davidson rider Brad Andres was the most successful competitor during the Belknap era with four victories in five years between 1955 and 1959. Three-time Grand National Champion Joe Leonard won the event three times before going on to a successful auto racing career. Harley-Davidson would win 13 of the 20 races held at Belknap, despite the track being near the Springfield, Massachusetts factory of their largest competitor, Indian motorcycles.

The event surged in popularity after the Second World War drawing increasingly larger crowds of spectators. The race grew to become a weeklong event known as Laconia Motorcycle Week that was the largest annual gathering of North American motorcyclists, until it was overtaken by the Sturgis Motorcycle Rally during the 1970s. When the overwhelming number of spectators created a rash of minor incidents in 1963, local residents protested the event. Unwilling to risk the increasing costs of property damage, and unable to reach an agreement with local officials, race promoters closed the Belknap track in 1964. The final race at the Belknap circuit held in 1963 was won by Jody Nicholas riding a BSA motorcycle.

=== Bryar Motorsports Park ===
The closure of the Belknap circuit resulted in the construction of the new 1.6-mile Bryar Motorsports Park in 1965, located 20 miles south of Laconia in Loudon, New Hampshire. The Laconia Classic gradually became known as the Loudon Classic. The Bryar Motorsports Park track road course followed the contours of a hillside around a small lake. Compressing 11 turns within its 1.6-mile length, the track was short and tight, making it one of the best venues to watch motorcycle racing in the United States. Slight elevation changes in the track layout allowed many spectators to follow a racer for a complete lap of the circuit.

The track developed a reputation for its challenging nature as, riders were constantly applying throttle or their brakes for the entire lap. It rewarded a rider's skill over horsepower and its many turns allowed for aggressive racing. The circuit hosted numerous amateur races during the year which bred many local track experts who often provided challenging competition for national championship level riders when they arrived for the annual Loudon Classic.

Gary Nixon and Mike Baldwin were the most successful competitors during the Bryar Motorsports era, each with four victories. When Gary Fisher won the race in 1972 riding a Yamaha, he joined his father, 1953 Laconia Classic winner Ed Fisher, as the only father son duo to have won the race. His victory aboard a Yamaha also marked the first victory by a Japanese manufacturer in the history of the event. Fisher's 1972 victory marked the last 100-mile national as, the race distance was reduced to 75-miles for 1973. Carter Alsop became the first female competitor in an AMA professional road race when she entered the Novice Class at the 1977 Loudon Classic. Jamie James won the final race on the Bryar Motorsports Park circuit in 1989 before it was purchased by Bob Bahre, who built the New Hampshire Motor Speedway in its place.

=== New Hampshire Motor Speedway ===
Construction of the New Hampshire Motor Speedway was completed in 1990. The Loudon Classic continued as a national championship race at the new speedway until 2001 however, a combination of safety issues and more powerful motorcycles eventually made the track obsolete for AMA Superbike events. Eric Bostrom won the final AMA National Championship race at Loudon in 2001. Since 2002 the race has continued featuring semi-professional racers.

== Laconia & Loudon Classic Winners ==
=== Key ===
	Denotes national championship event.
	Denotes inducted into the AMA Motorcycle Hall of Fame.
*	Denotes winner of the Daytona 200 and Loudon Classic in the same year.

Year	Rider	Country	Machine	Race Distance	Course
1934	Babe Tancrede	USA	Harley-Davidson	200-mile (320 km)	3.3-mile (5.3 km) Swanzey, New Hampshire
1936	Hanford Marshall	USA	?	200-mile (320 km)	3.3-mile (5.3 km) Swanzey, New Hampshire
1937	Lester Hillbish	USA	Indian	100-mile (160 km)	1.0-mile (1.6 km) Old Orchard Beach, Maine
1938	Ed Kretz	USA	Indian	200-mile (320 km)	1.0-mile (1.6 km) Belknap Recreational Area
1939	Charles Daniels	USA	Harley-Davidson	100-mile (160 km)	1.0-mile (1.6 km) Belknap Recreational Area
1940	Babe Tancrede*	USA	Harley-Davidson	100-mile (160 km)	1.0-mile (1.6 km) Belknap Recreational Area
1941	June McCall	USA	Harley-Davidson	100-mile (160 km)	1.0-mile (1.6 km) Belknap Recreational Area
1942–1945: Not held (World War II)
1946	Ed Kretz	USA	Indian	100-mile (160 km)	1.0-mile (1.6 km) Belknap Recreational Area
1947	Alli Quattrocchi	USA	Harley-Davidson	100-mile (160 km)	1.0-mile (1.6 km) Belknap Recreational Area
1948	Joe Weatherly	USA	Harley-Davidson	100-mile (160 km)	1.0-mile (1.6 km) Belknap Recreational Area
1949	Joe Weatherly	USA	Harley-Davidson	100-mile (160 km)	1.0-mile (1.6 km) Belknap Recreational Area
1950	Bill Miller	USA	Harley-Davidson	100-mile (160 km)	1.0-mile (1.6 km) Belknap Recreational Area
1951	Dick Klamfoth*	USA	Norton	100-mile (160 km)	1.0-mile (1.6 km) Belknap Recreational Area
1952	Dick Klamfoth*	USA	Norton	100-mile (160 km)	1.0-mile (1.6 km) Belknap Recreational Area
1953	Eddie Fisher	USA	Triumph	100-mile (160 km)	1.0-mile (1.6 km) Belknap Recreational Area
1954	Joe Leonard	USA	Harley-Davidson	100-mile (160 km)	1.0-mile (1.6 km) Belknap Recreational Area
1955	Brad Andres*	USA	Harley-Davidson	100-mile (160 km)	1.0-mile (1.6 km) Belknap Recreational Area
1956	Brad Andres	USA	Harley-Davidson	100-mile (160 km)	1.0-mile (1.6 km) Belknap Recreational Area
1957	Joe Leonard*	USA	Harley-Davidson	100-mile (160 km)	1.0-mile (1.6 km) Belknap Recreational Area
1958	Brad Andres	USA	Harley-Davidson	100-mile (160 km)	1.0-mile (1.6 km) Belknap Recreational Area
1959	Brad Andres*	USA	Harley-Davidson	100-mile (160 km)	1.0-mile (1.6 km) Belknap Recreational Area
1960	Dick Mann	USA	BSA	100-mile (160 km)	1.0-mile (1.6 km) Belknap Recreational Area
1961	Joe Leonard	USA	Harley-Davidson	100-mile (160 km)	1.0-mile (1.6 km) Belknap Recreational Area
1962	Dick Mann	USA	Matchless	100-mile (160 km)	1.0-mile (1.6 km) Belknap Recreational Area
1963	Jody Nicholas	USA	BSA	100-mile (160 km)	1.0-mile (1.6 km) Belknap Recreational Area
1964: Race cancelled
1965	Ralph White	USA	Matchless	100-mile (160 km)	1.6-mile (2.6 km) Bryar Motorsports Park
1966	Buddy Elmore*	USA	Triumph	100-mile (160 km)	1.6-mile (2.6 km) Bryar Motorsports Park
1967	Gary Nixon*	USA	Triumph	100-mile (160 km)	1.6-mile (2.6 km) Bryar Motorsports Park
1968	Cal Rayborn*	USA	Harley-Davidson	100-mile (160 km)	1.6-mile (2.6 km) Bryar Motorsports Park
1969	Fred Nix	USA	Harley-Davidson	100-mile (160 km)	1.6-mile (2.6 km) Bryar Motorsports Park
1970	Gary Nixon	USA	Triumph	100-mile (160 km)	1.6-mile (2.6 km) Bryar Motorsports Park
1971	Mark Brelsford	USA	Harley-Davidson	100-mile (160 km)	1.6-mile (2.6 km) Bryar Motorsports Park
1972	Gary Fisher	USA	Yamaha	100-mile (160 km)	1.6-mile (2.6 km) Bryar Motorsports Park
1973	Gary Nixon	USA	Kawasaki	75-mile (121 km)	1.6-mile (2.6 km) Bryar Motorsports Park
1974	Gary Nixon	USA	Suzuki	75-mile (121 km)	1.6-mile (2.6 km) Bryar Motorsports Park
1975	Ron Pierce	USA	Yamaha	75-mile (121 km)	1.6-mile (2.6 km) Bryar Motorsports Park
1976	Steve Baker	USA	Yamaha	75-mile (121 km)	1.6-mile (2.6 km) Bryar Motorsports Park
1977	Kenny Roberts	USA	Yamaha	75-mile (121 km)	1.6-mile (2.6 km) Bryar Motorsports Park
1978	Skip Aksland	USA	Yamaha	75-mile (121 km)	1.6-mile (2.6 km) Bryar Motorsports Park
1979	Skip Aksland	USA	Yamaha	75-mile (121 km)	1.6-mile (2.6 km) Bryar Motorsports Park
1980	Rich Schlachter	USA	Yamaha	75-mile (121 km)	1.6-mile (2.6 km) Bryar Motorsports Park
1981	Nick Richichi	USA	Yamaha	75-mile (121 km)	1.6-mile (2.6 km) Bryar Motorsports Park
1982	Mike Baldwin	USA	Honda	75-mile (121 km)	1.6-mile (2.6 km) Bryar Motorsports Park
1983	Mike Baldwin	USA	Honda	75-mile (121 km)	1.6-mile (2.6 km) Bryar Motorsports Park
1984	Mike Baldwin	USA	Honda	75-mile (121 km)	1.6-mile (2.6 km) Bryar Motorsports Park
1985	Mike Baldwin	USA	Honda	75-mile (121 km)	1.6-mile (2.6 km) Bryar Motorsports Park
1986	Randy Renfrow	USA	Honda	75-mile (121 km)	1.6-mile (2.6 km) Bryar Motorsports Park
1987	Kevin Schwantz	USA	Suzuki	75-mile (121 km)	1.6-mile (2.6 km) Bryar Motorsports Park
1988	Doug Polen	USA	Suzuki	75-mile (121 km)	1.6-mile (2.6 km) Bryar Motorsports Park
1989	Jamie James	USA	Yamaha	75-mile (121 km)	1.6-mile (2.6 km) Bryar Motorsports Park
1990	Doug Chandler	USA	Yamaha	75-mile (121 km)	1.6-mile (2.6 km) New Hampshire Motor Speedway
1991	Scott Russell	USA	Kawasaki	75-mile (121 km)	1.6-mile (2.6 km) New Hampshire Motor Speedway
1992	Scott Russell*	USA	Kawasaki	75-mile (121 km)	1.6-mile (2.6 km) New Hampshire Motor Speedway
1993	Scott Russell	USA	Kawasaki	75-mile (121 km)	1.6-mile (2.6 km) New Hampshire Motor Speedway
1994	Troy Corser	Australia	Ducati	75-mile (121 km)	1.6-mile (2.6 km) New Hampshire Motor Speedway
1995	Miguel Duhamel	Canada	Honda	75-mile (121 km)	1.6-mile (2.6 km) New Hampshire Motor Speedway
1996	Miguel Duhamel*	Canada	Honda	75-mile (121 km)	1.6-mile (2.6 km) New Hampshire Motor Speedway
1997	Mat Mladin	Australia	Ducati	75-mile (121 km)	1.6-mile (2.6 km) New Hampshire Motor Speedway
1998	Aaron Yates	USA	Suzuki	75-mile (121 km)	1.6-mile (2.6 km) New Hampshire Motor Speedway
1999	Doug Chandler	USA	Kawasaki	75-mile (121 km)	1.6-mile (2.6 km) New Hampshire Motor Speedway
2000	Mat Mladin*	Australia	Suzuki	75-mile (121 km)	1.6-mile (2.6 km) New Hampshire Motor Speedway
2001	Eric Bostrom	USA	Kawasaki	75-mile (121 km)	1.6-mile (2.6 km) New Hampshire Motor Speedway
2002	Charles Chouinard	USA	Suzuki	75-mile (121 km)	1.6-mile (2.6 km) New Hampshire Motor Speedway
2003	Scott Greenwood	USA	Suzuki	75-mile (121 km)	1.6-mile (2.6 km) New Hampshire Motor Speedway
2004	Jeff Wood	USA	Suzuki	75-mile (121 km)	1.6-mile (2.6 km) New Hampshire Motor Speedway
2005	Jeff Wood	USA	Suzuki	75-mile (121 km)	1.6-mile (2.6 km) New Hampshire Motor Speedway
2006	Mike Martire	USA	Kawasaki	75-mile (121 km)	1.6-mile (2.6 km) New Hampshire Motor Speedway
2007	Jeff Wood	USA	Suzuki	75-mile (121 km)	1.6-mile (2.6 km) New Hampshire Motor Speedway
2008	Jeff Wood	USA	Suzuki	75-mile (121 km)	1.6-mile (2.6 km) New Hampshire Motor Speedway
2009	Shane Narbonne	USA	Suzuki	75-mile (121 km)	1.6-mile (2.6 km) New Hampshire Motor Speedway
2010	Scott Greenwood	USA	Yamaha	75-mile (121 km)	1.6-mile (2.6 km) New Hampshire Motor Speedway
2011	Shane Narbonne	USA	Suzuki	75-mile (121 km)	1.6-mile (2.6 km) New Hampshire Motor Speedway
2012	Eric Wood	USA	Ducati	75-mile (121 km)	1.6-mile (2.6 km) New Hampshire Motor Speedway
2013	Shane Narbonne	USA	Suzuki	75-mile (121 km)	1.6-mile (2.6 km) New Hampshire Motor Speedway
2014	Scott Greenwood	USA	Yamaha	75-mile (121 km)	1.6-mile (2.6 km) New Hampshire Motor Speedway
2015	Shane Narbonne	USA	Suzuki	75-mile (121 km)	1.6-mile (2.6 km) New Hampshire Motor Speedway
2016	Shane Narbonne	USA	Suzuki	75-mile (121 km)	1.6-mile (2.6 km) New Hampshire Motor Speedway
2017	Shane Narbonne	USA	Suzuki	75-mile (121 km)	1.6-mile (2.6 km) New Hampshire Motor Speedway
2018	Shane Narbonne	USA	Yamaha	75-mile (121 km)	1.6-mile (2.6 km) New Hampshire Motor Speedway
2019	Scott Greenwood	USA	Yamaha	32-mile (51 km)	1.6-mile (2.6 km) New Hampshire Motor Speedway
2020	Shane Narbonne	USA	Yamaha	32-mile (51 km)	1.6-mile (2.6 km) New Hampshire Motor Speedway
2021	Shane Narbonne	USA	Yamaha	32-mile (51 km)	1.6-mile (2.6 km) New Hampshire Motor Speedway
2022	Shane Narbonne	USA	Yamaha	32-mile (51 km)	1.6-mile (2.6 km) New Hampshire Motor Speedway
2023	Tyler Scott	USA	Suzuki	32-mile (51 km)	1.6-mile (2.6 km) New Hampshire Motor Speedway
2024	Hayden Gillim	USA	Suzuki	32-mile (51 km)	1.6-mile (2.6 km) New Hampshire Motor Speedway
2025	Tyler Scott	USA	Suzuki	32-mile (51 km)	1.6-mile (2.6 km) New Hampshire Motor Speedway
