= Michael Vincent Band =

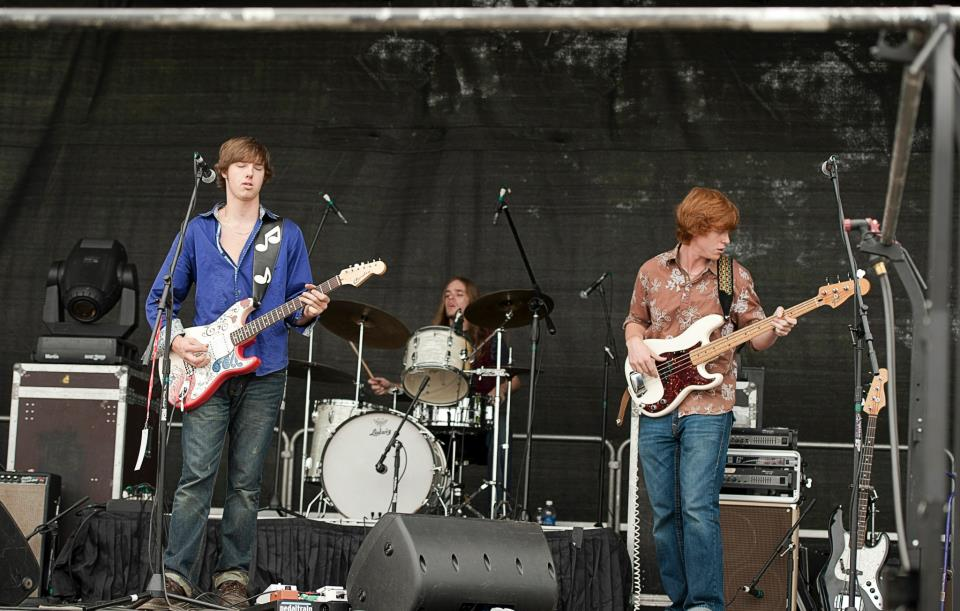
- The Michael Vincent Band performing onstage at the Laconia Motorcycle Rally in 2012

Background information
- Also known as: "MVB"
- Origin: Gilford, New Hampshire
- Genres: Blues, rock
- Years active: 2008-Present
- Members: Michael Vincent; Dan Mack; Dan Hewitt
- Past members: Dwight Everett (guitar, vocals); Taylor Lannamann (Hammond B3)
- Website: www.michaelvincentband.com

Michael Vincent Band is a New England–based blues and rock band led by guitarist Michael Vincent. The regular lineup includes bass guitarist Dan Mack and drummer Dan Hewitt.

In 2013, the Michael Vincent Band released their debut album, Putting the Word in the Streets.

The band gained notoriety for their young age and choice of musical style. In 2008 they played alongside Jack Bruce of Cream, Eric Burdon and the Animals, and Joey Molland of Badfinger. On January 12, 2013, they shared the bill with Johnny Winter at the Flying Monkey Performance Center in Plymouth, New Hampshire. They have been a featured band at Morgan Freeman's Ground Zero Club in Clarksdale, Mississippi, played alongside Buddy Guy at his Legends Club in Chicago, and have worked with ZZ Top Fandango! engineer Terry Kane.

== Discography ==
- Mama's Rockin' (2018)
- Puttin' the Word in the Streets (2013)
- Doubleshot (2012)
