= Ossian Wilbur Goss Reading Room =

- U.S. National Register of Historic Places
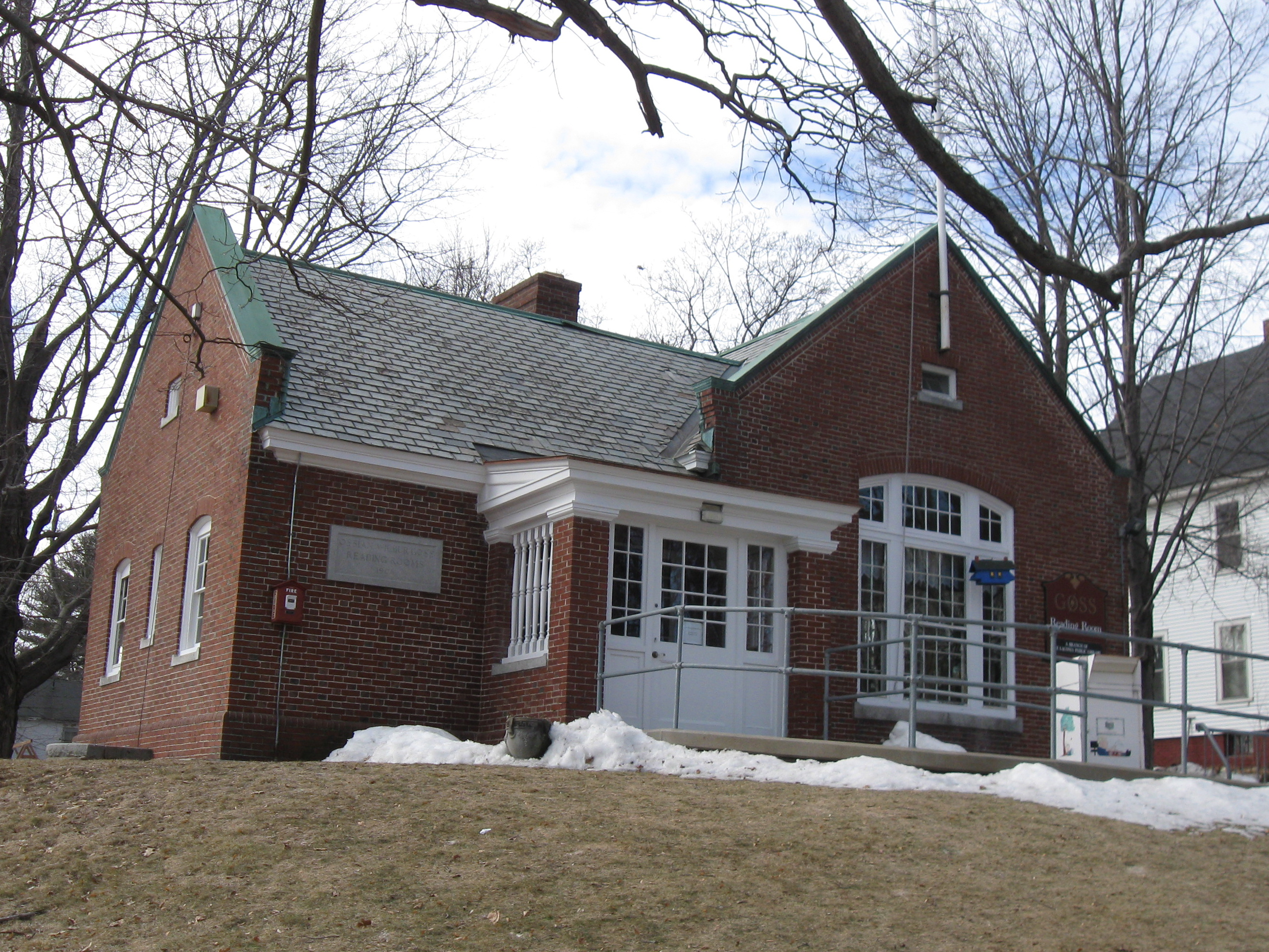

- Location within New Hampshire Location within the United States
- Location: 188 Elm St., Laconia, New Hampshire
- Coordinates: 43°32′57″N 71°27′59″W
- Area: 0.4 acres (0.16 ha)
- Built: 1905
- Architect: Willard P. Adden
- NRHP reference No.: 86002165
- Added to NRHP: September 4, 1986

The Ossian Wilbur Goss Reading Room is a historic library building at 188 Elm Street in the Lakeport section of Laconia, New Hampshire. The architecturally eclectic single-story brick building was designed by Boston architect Willard P. Adden and built in 1905–06 after the collection of the former Lakeport library was moved to the recently built Gale Memorial Library in the center of Laconia. Its construction was funded by a bequest from Ossian Wilbur Goss, a local doctor who had died without natural heirs. The building officially became a branch of the Laconia library system in 1909, and continues to be administered in part by trustees of Goss's legacy. The building was listed on the National Register of Historic Places in 1986.

== Description and history ==
The Goss Reading Room is located in Laconia's Lakeport village, at the northwest corner of Franklin and Elm streets. It is a single-story brick building with an L-shaped configuration covered by a gabled roof. The gable ends are raised above the level of the slate roof, with caps at the ends. The main facade is dominated by a front-facing gable on the right, and an entrance vestibule at the center. The gable has a large six-part window in segmented-arch openings; the windows are set in a pattern of narrow windows on the outside and a wider one in the center, with sash windows topped by fixed transom windows. The entry vestibule has a shed roof and corner brick piers, with an entrance flanked by double-wide sidelights.

Lakeport was a village of Gilford until 1893, when it was annexed to Laconia. It had a village library, which had no permanent home. When Laconia's Gale Memorial Library was established in 1897, the Lakeport collection was merged into that one, and the library was closed. A lending arrangement was established at a local store, but this system was considered inadequate to village residents. Ossian Wilbur Goss was a local physician, whose house was one of over 100 buildings destroyed by a fire in 1903. His interest in providing a permanent branch library for the village was manifested in his plans to rebuild his residence. His wife and children had predeceased him, so he left a bequest instructing trustees to either adapt his house, or build a new structure, from the majority of his estate. He died in 1903, three weeks after signing the will, without having rebuilt. His appointed trustees oversaw the construction of this building on his house lot. It was designed by Boston architect Willard P. Adden, and was completed in 1907. It was formally accepted as a branch library by the city in 1909. The land and building continue to be owned by the Goss trustees, while the library is administered as part of the city library system.

== See also ==
- National Register of Historic Places listings in Belknap County, New Hampshire
