= Richard W. Bastraw =

American politician (1934–2025)

Member of the New Hampshire House of Representatives from the Belknap 9th district
- In office 1982–1986

Personal details
- Born: Richard William Bastraw; September 25, 1934 Laconia, New Hampshire, U.S.
- Died: February 26, 2025 (aged 90) Laconia, New Hampshire, U.S.
- Party: Republican

Richard William Bastraw (September 25, 1934 – February 26, 2025) was an American politician. A member of the Republican Party, he served in the New Hampshire House of Representatives from 1982 to 1986.

== Life and career ==
Bastraw was born in Laconia, New Hampshire. He served in the United States Army Reserve, and was promoted to the rank of captain. After his discharge, he worked as a teacher at a private school in Switzerland, and returned to the United States, where he taught at Inter-Lakes High School in Meredith, New Hampshire.

Barstraw served in the New Hampshire House of Representatives from 1982 to 1986.

== Death ==
Bastraw died in Laconia, New Hampshire on February 26, 2025, at the age of 90.
