= Ed Kretz =

American motorcycle racer

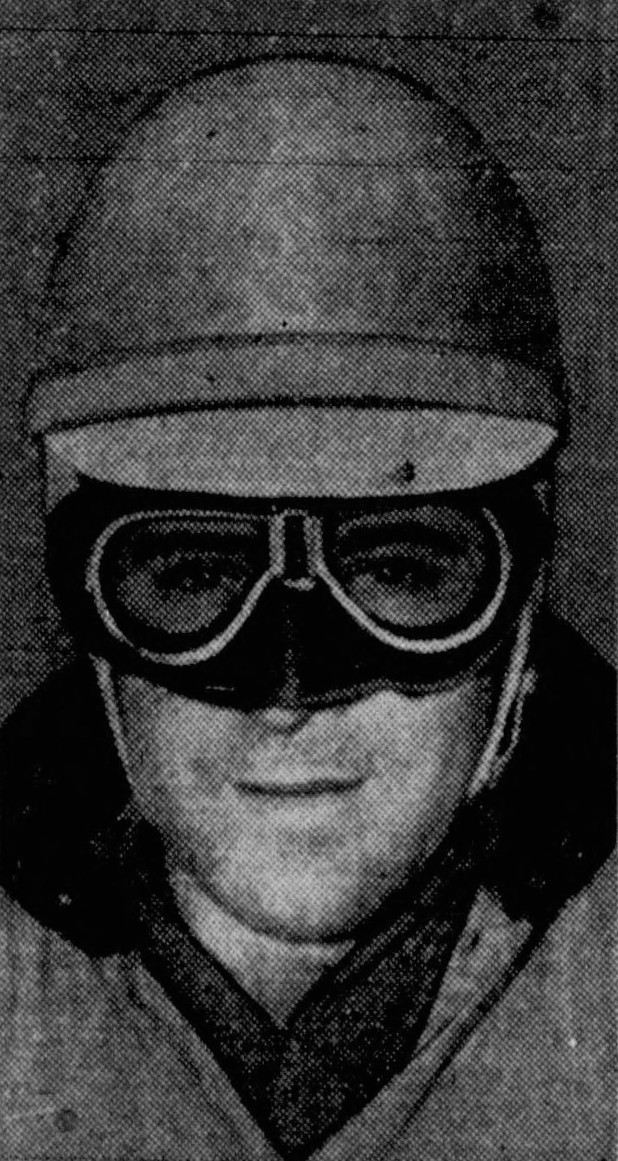
Kretz, circa 1942

Ed Kretz, Sr. (September 24, 1911 – January 30, 1996), aka Ed "Iron Man" Kretz, was an American professional motorcycle racer in the 1930s and 1940s. He is best known for winning the first Daytona 200 race in 1937, riding an Indian Sport Scout. Kretz, Sr. was a rough rider, who strove to finish, and win, every race. He rode #38, usually on an Indian motorcycle.

== Early life ==
Ed Kretz, Sr. was born in San Diego, California. Unlike many top motorcycle racers who often began riding at a young age, Kretz didn't start riding until he was 20. It was out of necessity during the Depression and a motorcycle was the only form of transportation that Kretz, Sr. could afford. While driving a truck transporting produce to Los Angeles, Kretz, Sr. began attending Southern California motorcycle field meets as a spectator. Eventually, he entered a few races and quickly became one of the top riders.

== Motorcycle racing career ==
Kretz, Sr. largely dominated the sport for over a decade. He won the first 200-mile Savannah Nationals at Langhorn (1936, 1937, 1938, 1940, and 1948) and the Laconia Classic (1938 and 1945). He was voted most popular rider of 1938 and 1948. He raced a 100-lap TT race in Ascot Park, Gardena, California, winning the lap money, the heat race, and the trophy race. Ed “Iron Man” Kretz retired from racing in 1959.

== Personal life ==
In 1937, Kretz was an original founder of the 13 Rebels Motorcycle Club along with Ernest "Tex" Bryant, Shell Thuett, Ted Evans, Ray, Thuett, Ernie Roccio, Johnny Roccio, Ray Bryant, Hill Wagner, Ed "Rip" Henley, Delmar Burkam, "Fearless" Fuller, Jimmy Wright, Les Mills, Dode Burdick, Johnny Enchando, Jack Horn, Jim Kelley, Kenny Hylander, Arden M. Van Sycle, Arden A. Van Sycle, Elmo Looper, Floyd Emde (winner of the 1948 Daytona 200). Wino Willie Forkner was also a member after WWII and would later go on to found the iconic Boozefighters MC in 1946. During World War II, Kretz served as a motorcycle troop instructor, teaching new recruits how to ride and maintain Indian motorcycles. After the war, he opened his own motorcycle dealership, which he retired from in 1986.
