= Federal Building (Laconia, New Hampshire) =

- U.S. National Register of Historic Places
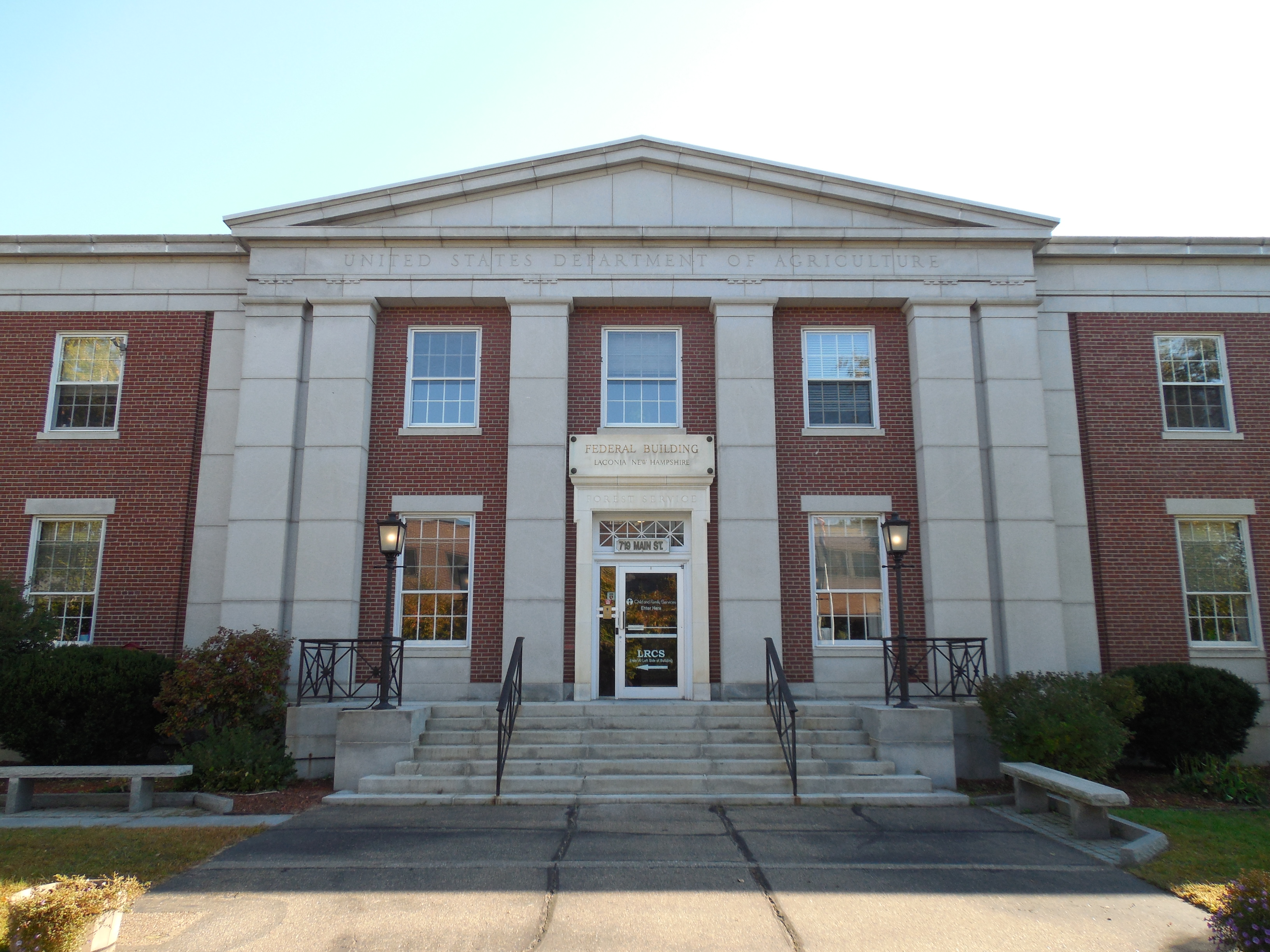
- Federal Building

- Location within New Hampshire Location within the United States
- Location: 719 Main St., Laconia, New Hampshire
- Coordinates: 43°31′50″N 71°28′17″W
- Built: 1939
- Architect: Simon, Louis
- Architectural style: Classical Revival
- NRHP reference No.: 11000766
- Added to NRHP: October 25, 2011

The former Federal Building in Laconia, New Hampshire, is located at 719 Main Street. Originally built to house the offices of the White Mountain National Forest, it now houses a regional social services agency. The building was listed on the National Register of Historic Places in 2011. The two-story brick Classical Revival structure was designed by Louis A. Simon and completed 1940.

== Description and history ==
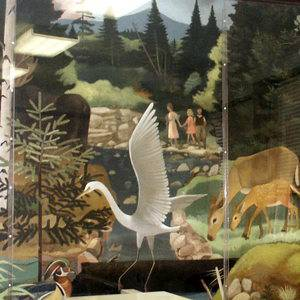
Wildlife in White Mountains (1941), Section of Painting and Sculpture mural by Musa McKim

Laconia's former Federal Building is located on the north side of downtown Laconia, on the east side of Main Street just north of its junction with the multiuse Winnisquam Trail. It is a two-story structure, built originally in a T-shape with a frame of steel and concrete. Its exterior is finished with red brick and granite, a stripped Classical Revival style. The main façade is divided into three sections, with a slightly projecting central entrance section. Its three bays are articulated by wide granite pilasters, with additional pilasters at the corners. They rise to an entablature bearing the legend "United States Department of Agriculture", and a shallow pedimented gable. Windows in the outer sections have granite sills, and the building corners have granite quoins.

The structure was designed by Louis A. Simon, the Supervising Architect of the United States Treasury Department, and was built from 1939 to 1940. It was expanded to an H shape with a sympathetic addition in 1966. It originally housed the administrative offices of the White Mountain National Forest, a division of the United States Forest Service and the United States Department of Agriculture. The building's interior reflects this intended use, with a pair of lobby murals on forestry-related themes, executed by Philip Guston and Musa McKim. These murals are now housed in the James Cleveland Federal Building in Concord, New Hampshire.

== See also ==
- National Register of Historic Places listings in Belknap County, New Hampshire
