= Musa McKim =

American painter and poet (1908–1992)

- Born: Musa Jane McKim; August 23, 1908; Oil City, Pennsylvania, U.S.
- Died: March 30, 1992 (aged 83); Kingston, New York, U.S.
- Education: Otis Art Institute
- Known for: Painting, poetry
- Spouse: Philip Guston
- Family: Josephine McKim (sister)

Musa Jane McKim Guston (née McKim; August 23, 1908 – March 30, 1992) was an American painter and poet. Born in Oil City, Pennsylvania, McKim spent much of her youth in Panama. During the Great Depression, she worked under the Section of Fine Arts, painting murals in public buildings, including a Post Office building in Waverly, New York. She was the wife of New York School artist Philip Guston, whom she met while attending the Otis Art Institute. In cooperation with him, she painted a mural in a United States Forest Service building in Laconia, New Hampshire, and panels which were placed aboard United States Maritime Commission ships. After her painting career, she wrote poetry, publishing her work in small literary magazines. Along with her husband and daughter, she lived in Iowa City, Iowa and New York City, eventually settling in Woodstock, New York. Her younger sister was Olympic swimmer Josephine McKim (1910-1992).

== Art career ==
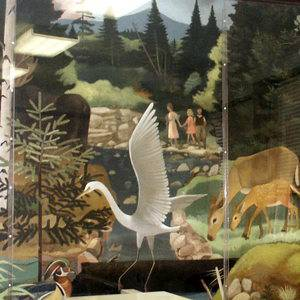
'Wildlife in White Mountain,' painted by McKim in 1941. A companion mural was painted in the same location by her husband, Philip Guston

McKim studied at the Otis Art Institute. She worked as a painter under the Section of Fine Arts, creating murals in public places during the Great Depression. She was commissioned to paint a mural for the Post Office branch building in Waverly, New York 1939. Entitled 'Spanish Hill and the Early Inhabitants of the Vicinity,' the work depicts Native Americans as well as early settlers to the region. The appearance of the settlers was based on members of McKim's family, including her father, Frederick McKim and her mother, Musa Hunter McKim. Her daughter, Musa Mayer (née Guston), noted that McKim's sister Josephine is not depicted, although she suggests that the "spirited black horse their mother struggles to control" could be a symbolic representation of her. For her work, she was paid $650 by the Section of Fine Arts. According to Mayer, McKim disliked the mural.

In 1941, she worked alongside her husband in the painting of two murals for the U.S. Forest Service building in Laconia, New Hampshire. Commissioned by the Section of Fine Arts, the murals are titled 'Pulp Wood Logging' and 'Wildlife in White Mountain.' The former, a logging scene, was executed by Philip, while the latter, depicting local wildlife, was painted by Musa. In a 1965 interview, Philip stated that Musa "did several other murals for the Section of Fine Arts." In addition to her other work, she and her husband were employed by the United States Maritime Commission to paint a series of panels which were to be installed in three cargo ships: the USS President Monroe, the USS President Jackson and the USS President Hayes.

Guston posed for her husband throughout his career for various works, including a 1944 painting entitled The Young Mother, for which she sat along with their daughter, also named Musa.

== Writing career ==
After her painting career, McKim wrote poetry; her work was published in small literary journals, including the experimental poetry journal Locus Solus. In 1982, her poetry was published alongside Guston's artwork in the Summer edition of The Harvard Advocate. In 1994, a posthumous collection of McKim's poetry, 'Alone with the Moon', was published with an introduction by U.S. Poet Laureate Stanley Kunitz.

== Personal life ==
McKim was born on August 23, 1908, in Oil City, Pennsylvania. She spent much of her young life in Panama, as her father Frederick was employed as a civil servant in the Canal Zone. He conducted anthropological studies of the indigenous Guna people.

In 1930, she met her future husband, abstract expressionist New York School painter Philip Guston (then Phillip Goldstein) while attending the Otis Art Institute. She later left the institute and returned to Panama. She sent a letter to the Stanley Rose Book Shop, a Hollywood gathering place of artists, inquiring as to the address of Phillip Goldstein. Fellow painter Herman Cherry gave the letter to Goldstein, he replied, and McKim returned to Los Angeles to live with him soon after. He changed his name to Philip Guston in 1935, and in 1936, at the urging of Jackson Pollock, whom Philip met and befriended while attending Manual Arts High School, he and Musa moved to New York City. They married on February 4, 1937, in New York City Hall. The ceremony was witnessed by Sande McCoy, Pollock's half-brother. In 1940, they moved to the artist colony of Woodstock, New York. The next year, in the fall of 1941, Philip accepted a position as artist-in-residence at the University of Iowa in Iowa City. Their daughter, Musa Jane Guston, was born there in 1943. Later, in 1945, Philip accepted a position at Washington University in St. Louis. In 1947, the family returned to New York, living in the Byrdcliffe Colony; they settled in nearby Woodstock once again in 1948. In 1949, following a brief stay in Rome, Musa and Philip Guston began commuting between Woodstock and New York City, where the latter opened a studio. In 1967, they left New York City to live permanently in Woodstock. In October 1970, they moved to Rome, after Philip's recent gallery show received severe criticism. They lived at the American Academy in Rome while Philip added works to his gallery, until May 1971, when they returned to New York. Philip died on June 7, 1980. Musa lived in Woodstock for the remainder of her life, dying on March 30, 1992, aged 83, in Kingston.

== Bibliography ==
- Ashton, Dore (1990). A Critical Study of Philip Guston. Berkeley: University of California Press. ISBN 0520069323.
- Mayer, Musa (1990). Night Studio: A Memoir of Philip Guston. Penguin Books. ISBN 0-14-013320-8.
