= United States Post Office (Waverly, New York) =

- US Post Office-Waverly
- U.S. National Register of Historic Places
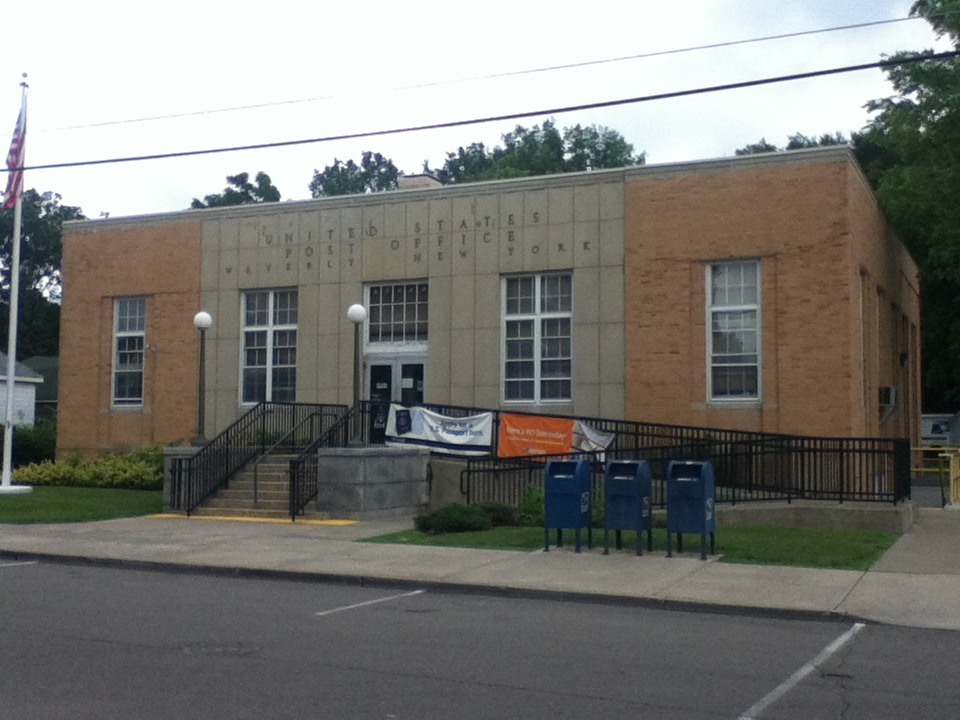

- Location within New York Location within the United States
- Location: 434-348 Waverly St., Waverly, New York
- Coordinates: 42°0′7″N 76°32′26″W
- Area: less than one acre
- Built: 1936
- Architect: Simon, Louis A.; US Treasury Department
- Architectural style: Colonial Revival
- MPS: US Post Offices in New York State, 1858-1943, TR
- NRHP reference No.: 88002444
- Added to NRHP: May 11, 1989

US Post Office-Waverly is a historic post office building located at Waverly in Tioga County, New York. It was designed and built in 1936–1937 and is one of a number of post offices in New York State designed by the Office of the Supervising Architect of the Treasury Department, Louis A. Simon. It is a one-story, five-bay, steel-frame building clad in yellow/buff-colored brick on a raised foundation executed in the Colonial Revival style. The interior features a 1939 mural by artist Musa McKim titled "Spanish Hill and the Early Inhabitants of the Vicinity."

It was listed on the National Register of Historic Places in 1988.
