= Robbie Mills Field =

Baseball field located in Laconia, NH

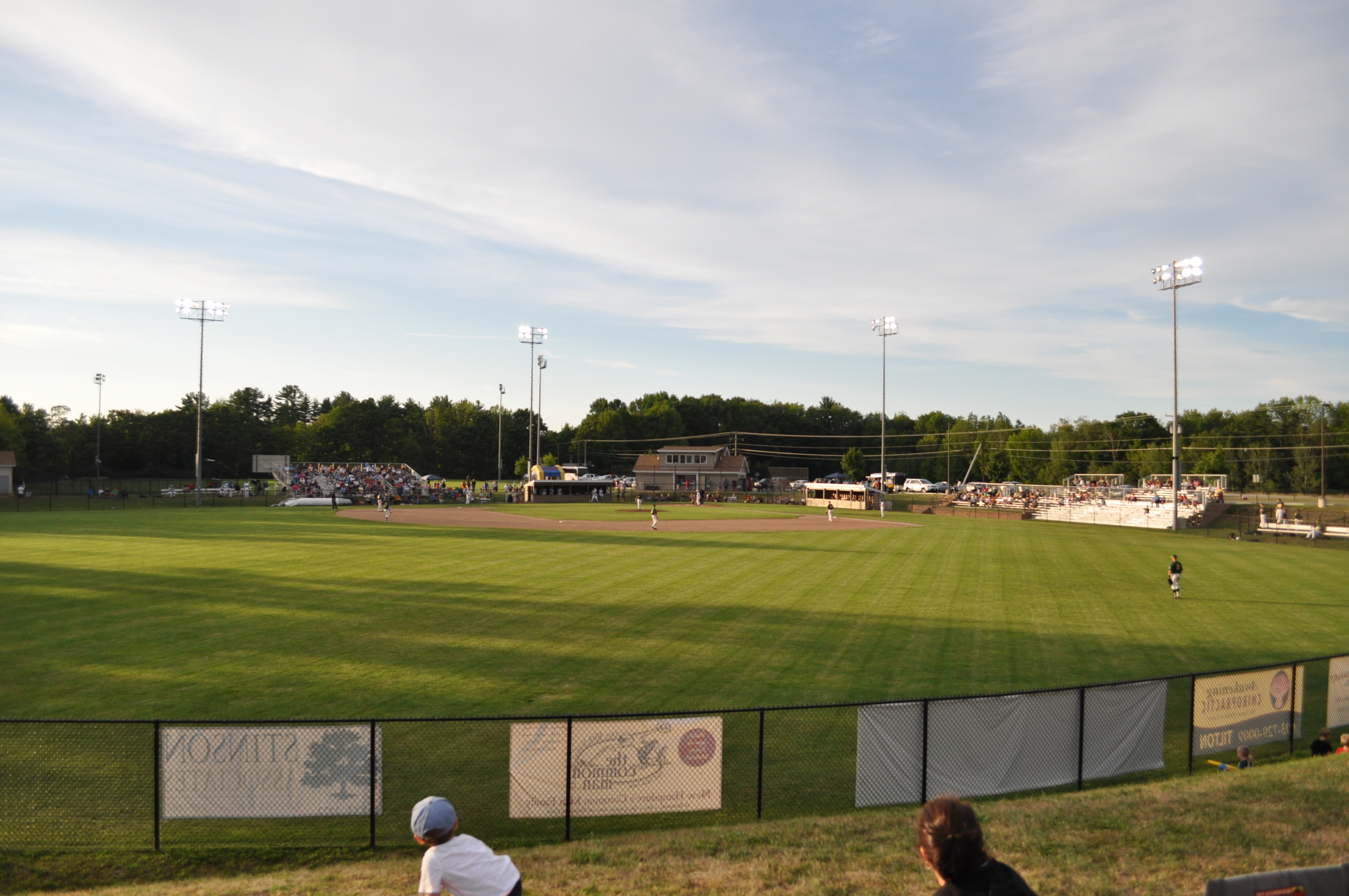
- Interactive map of Robbie Mills Field
- Location: 15 Eastman Road, Laconia, New Hampshire, USA
- Coordinates: 43.567682°N 71.498358°W
- Capacity: 1,200 (seated)
- Scoreboard: Yes

Construction
- Built: 2005
- Renovated: 2009-2010

Tenant
- Winnipesaukee Muskrats (NECBL) (2010-2022)

Robbie Mills Field is a baseball venue located in Laconia, New Hampshire, United States. It was home to the Winnipesaukee Muskrats of the collegiate summer New England Collegiate Baseball League (NECBL). The Muskrats began play there in the 2010 season. The field was built in 2005 and is named after Robbie Mills, a Laconia boy who was killed and robbed of his bicycle in 1998.

Robbie Mills Field has a seating capacity of 1,200 spectators, in uncovered bleachers beyond both the first-base and third-base dugouts. There is also a small bleacher section beyond centerfield, and fans can set up their own lawn chairs beyond the outfield and behind the backstop.

== Renovation ==
In 2009, after the arrival of the Muskrats was announced, the field underwent extensive renovations to comply with NECBL standards. The outfield fences were pushed back to 340 feet down the lines and 370 feet in the gaps. Additionally, a press box was constructed atop the existing concession stand and bleachers and dugouts were expanded.

In 2012, the Laconia Muskrats added an 18' x 88' green outfield wall that is a smaller replica of Fenway Park's Green Monster. The wall, a popular feature of the park, is called the Muskrat Monster.

== Photo gallery ==
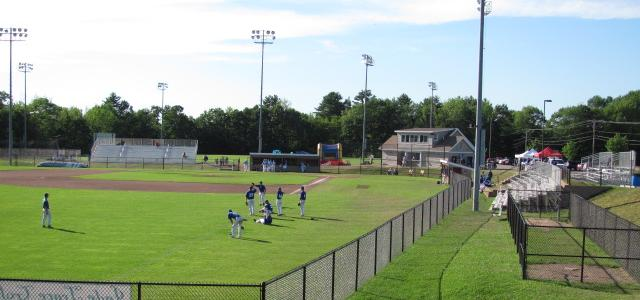

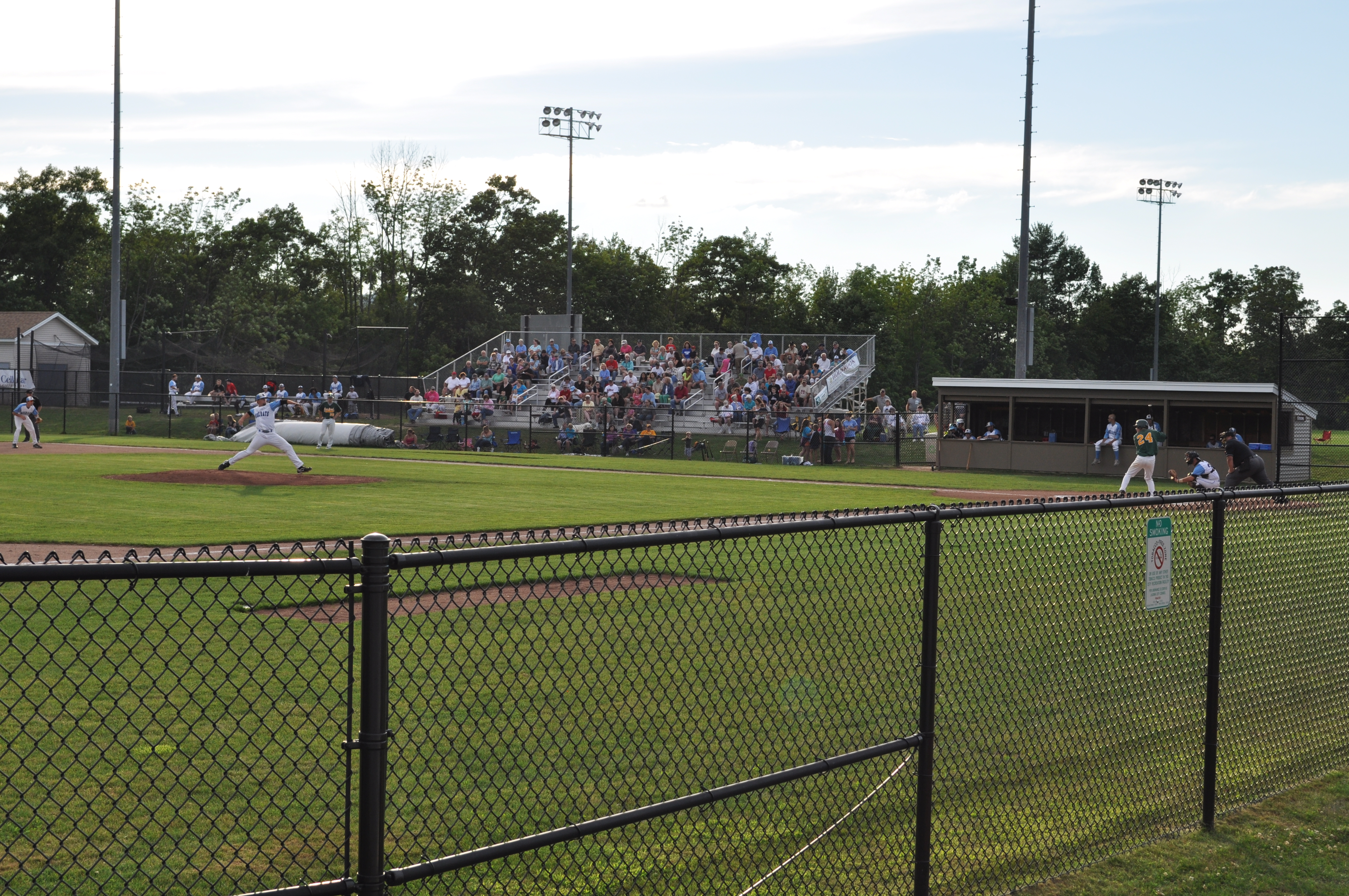

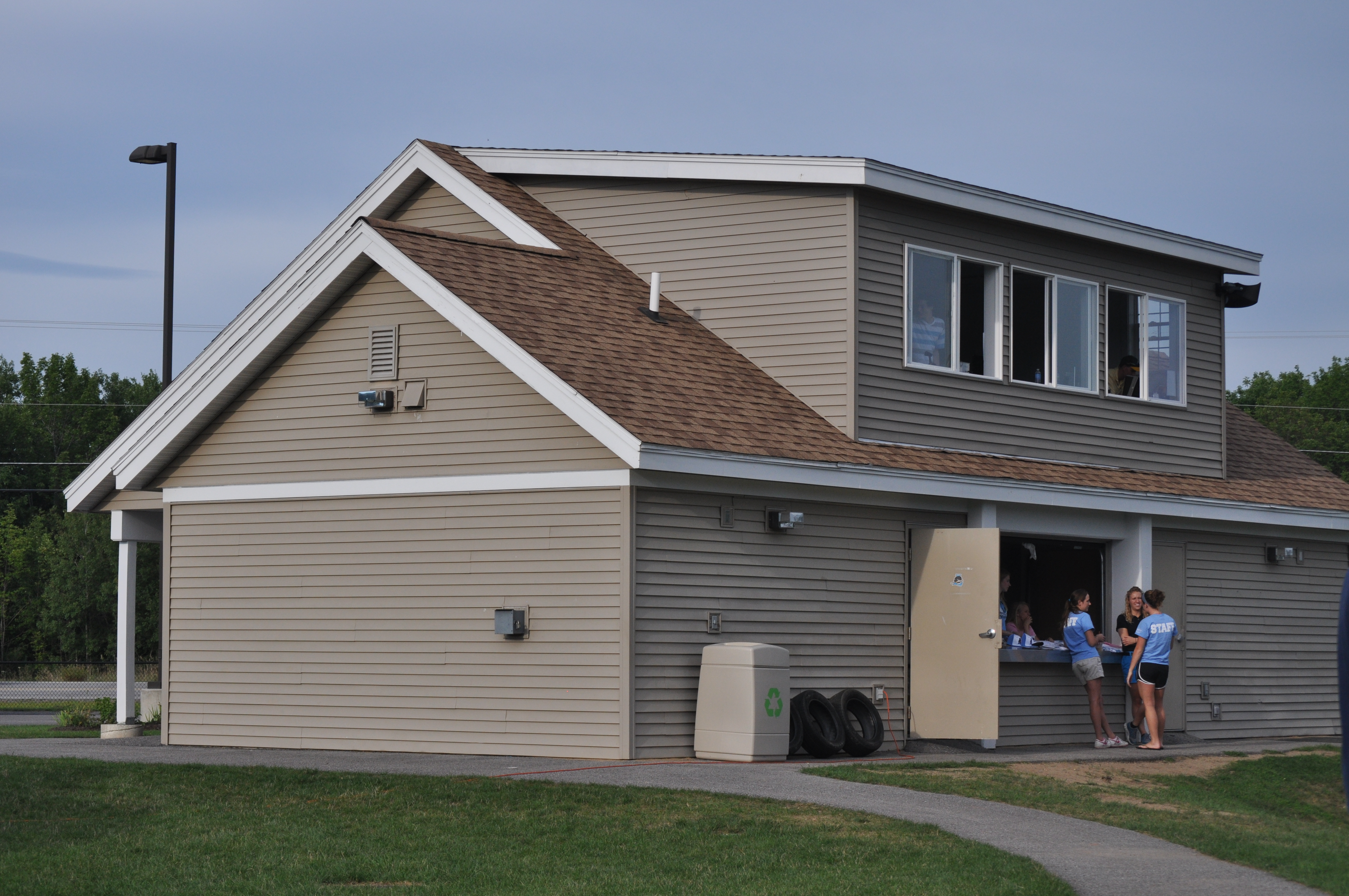

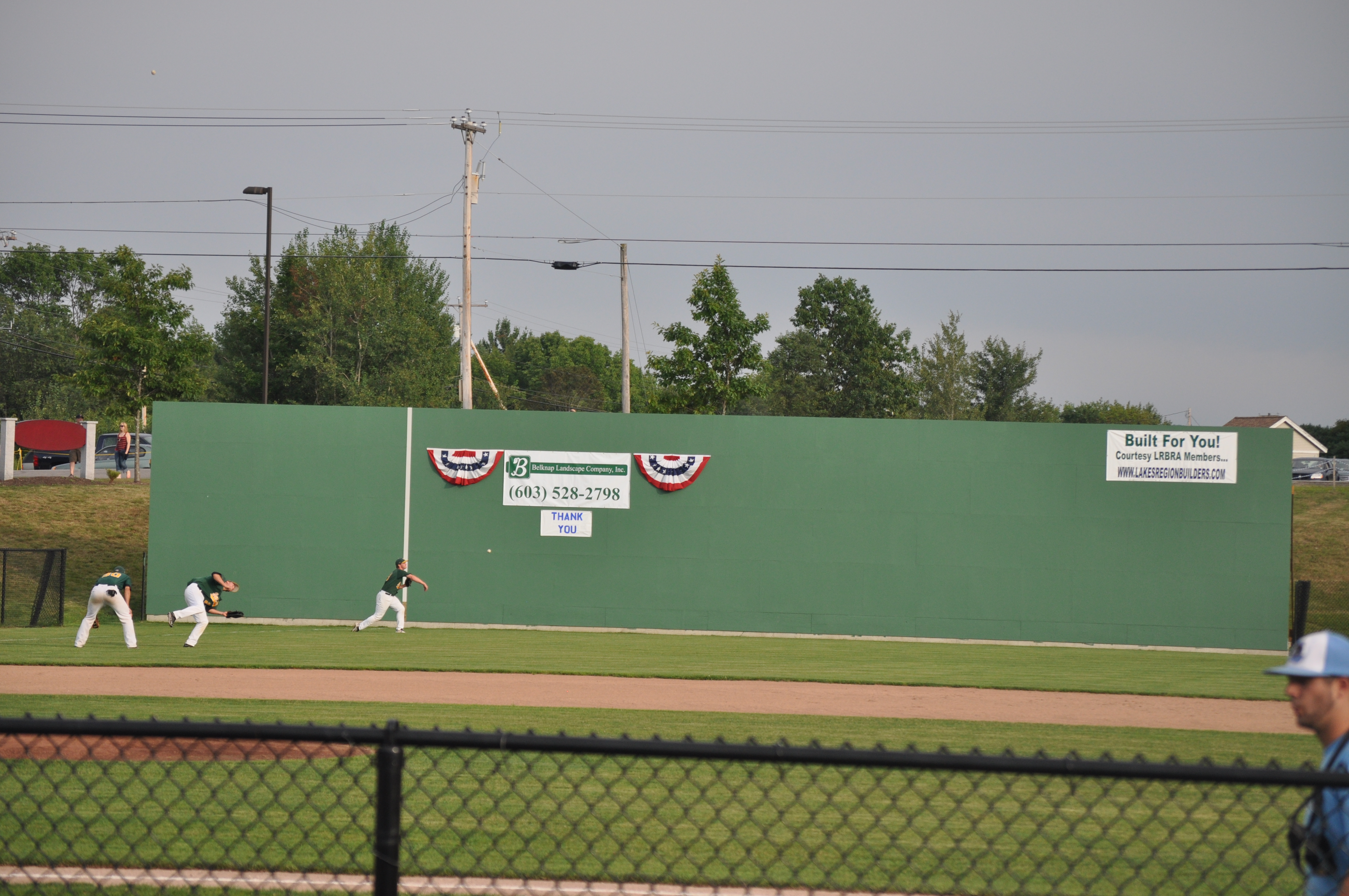

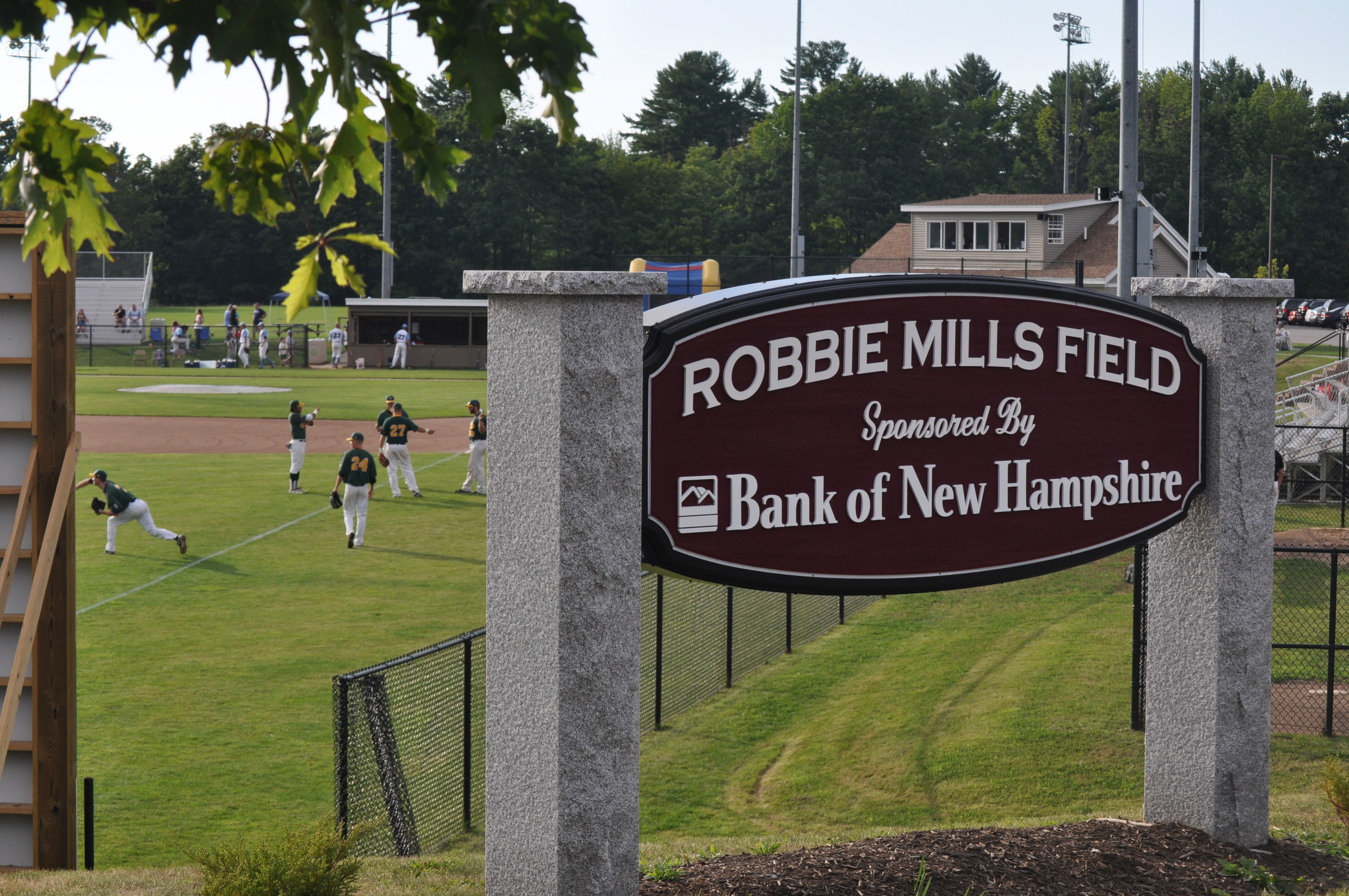
