= Laconia Motorcycle Week =

Annual motorcycle rally held in New Hampshire, US

Coordinates: 43°36′32″N 71°27′38″W

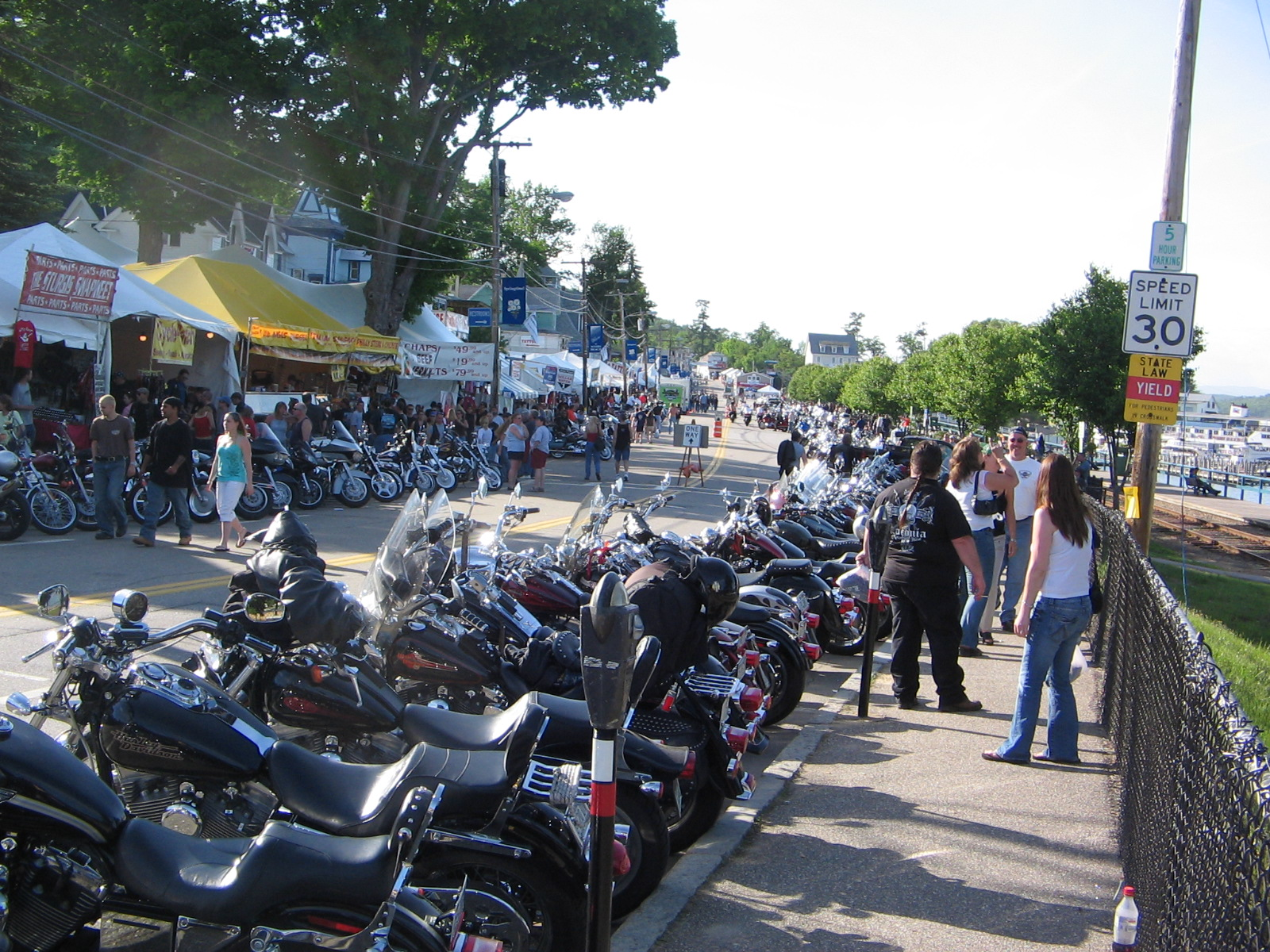
- Line-up of motorcycles at Weirs Beach during the 2007 event
- Genre: Motorcycle rally
- Dates: Historically 9 days in June, ending on Father's Day
- Locations: Laconia, New Hampshire, U.S.
- Founded: 1916
- Attendance: 375,000 (2004) c. 188,000 (2010)
- Patrons: Laconia Motorcycle Rally and Race Association
- Website: www.laconiamcweek.com

Laconia Motorcycle Week is an annual motorcycle rally held in Laconia, New Hampshire, United States. The rally originated as a motorcycle Gypsy tour in 1916 as, the New Hampshire Lakes Region became a popular riding destination for early motorcycle enthusiasts from New York, Boston, Philadelphia and Montreal. The popularity of the rally led to the formation of the Loudon Classic motorcycle race in 1934 which, became one of the most prestigious races in American motorcycle racing, second only to the Daytona 200. The scheduled events included races, shows and a motorcycle hill climb competition. The rally traditionally takes place over nine days in June, always the 2nd and 3rd full weekend. The rally was the largest annual gathering of North American motorcyclists until it was overtaken by the Sturgis Motorcycle Rally during the 1970s.

== History ==
The Laconia rally has its origins in June 1916, when a few hundred motorcyclists gathered at Weirs Beach in Laconia. Seven years later, the event was officially recognized by the Federation of American Motorcyclists (to be later called the American Motorcyclist Association) as part of the Gypsy Tour, where motorcyclists celebrated races and hill climbs for an entire weekend. The Federation of American Motorcyclists continued to sanction the event until 1960.

Motorcyclists continued to return to Laconia in stronger numbers. Participants began flocking to Laconia earlier in the week until the rally unofficially became a week-long event. Local businesses became strong supporters of the event which kick-started the beginning of their busy tourist season.

However, Laconia's Bike Week did see times of trouble. During the summer of 1965, a riot between motorcycle gangs and local police broke out, which brought national media attention to Laconia. The police and city officials began to view the rally as a major inconvenience. Laconia officials imposed stricter law enforcement, and the number of events during the week began to decline. The rally was eventually minimized to a three-day weekend and saw a large decline in the number of participants.

It was not until the early 1990s that, in an effort to increase tourism, Laconia businesses approached the Federation of American Motorcyclists for their support to bring the rally back to a week-long event. Eventually the business owners joined in a coalition with local motorcycle groups and founded the Laconia Motorcycle Rally and Race Association, which organizes and schedules all events associated with motorcycle week. The group is also responsible for promoting the event nationwide and issuing licenses to vendors. Laconia Motorcycle week is now a nine-day event which will either start or end on Father's Day.

== Deaths ==
For a number of years there have been deaths during the event. There were six deaths in 2001, one in 2002, two in 2003, five in 2004, four in 2005, six in 2006 (including at least one car driver not affiliated with the event), five in 2007, and seven in 2008. There were no deaths in 2009 nor 2020, but in 2010 three motorcyclists were killed. One cyclist was killed in 2011, 2016, 2018 and 2019, and four each in 2012–2013.

New Hampshire does not mandate wearing motorcycle helmets for riders over 18, which it has been claimed is a reason why some riders are attracted to events in the state. Some of the riders killed in accidents at Laconia Motorcycle Week have not worn helmets, and this is reported in the press.
