= Weirs Beach, New Hampshire =

Unincorporated community in New Hampshire, United States

- Neighborhood
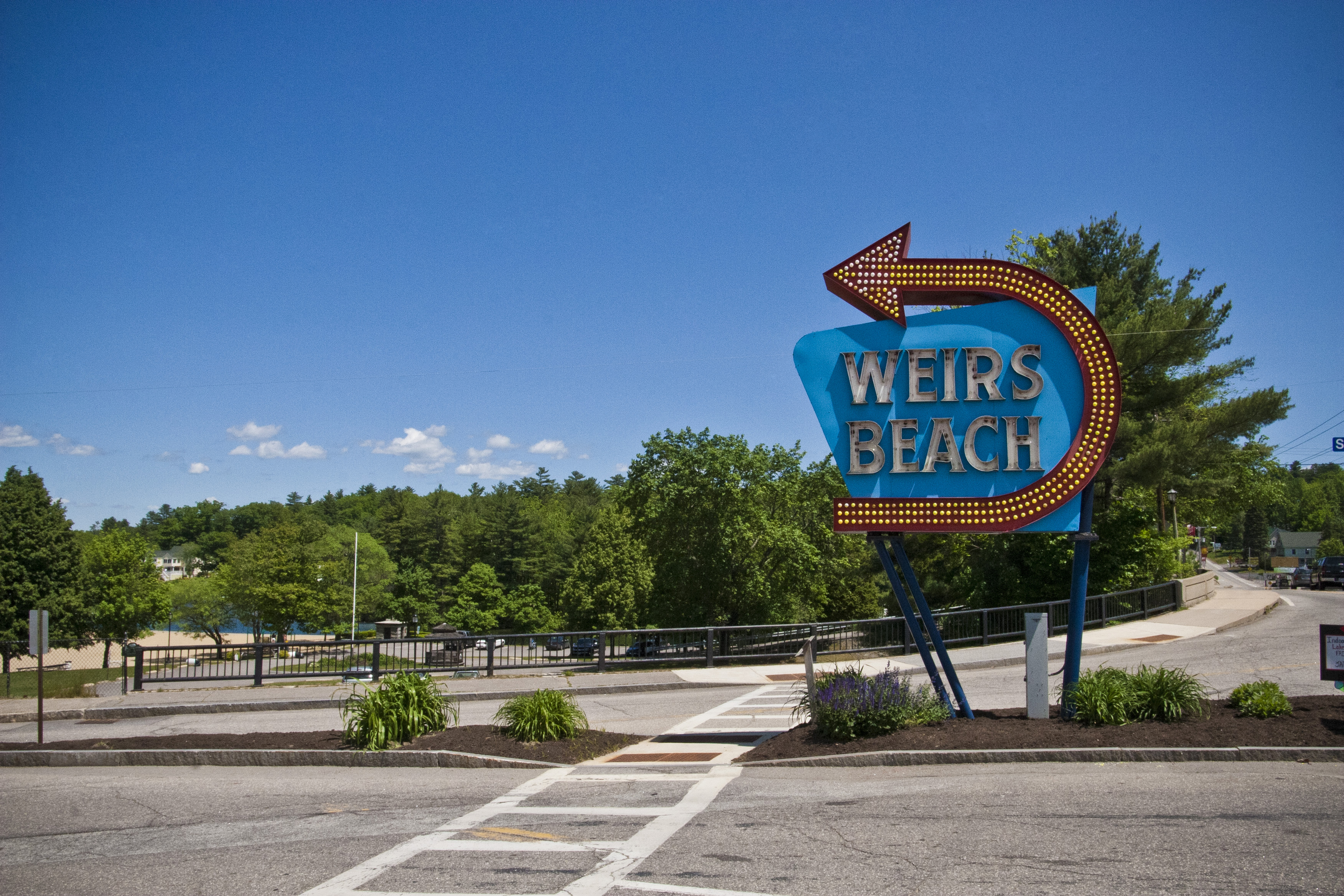
- The Weirs Beach sign, located at the beginning of Lakeside Ave.

- Location within New Hampshire Location within the United States
- Coordinates: 43°36′32″N 71°27′38″W
- Country: United States
- State: New Hampshire
- County: Belknap
- City: Laconia
- Elevation: 535 ft (163 m)
- Time zone: UTC-5 (Eastern (EST))
  - Summer (DST): UTC-4 (EDT)
- ZIP Codes: 03246, 03247 (Laconia)
- Area code: 603
- GNIS feature ID: 870719

Weirs Beach is an area within the northern part of the city of Laconia in Belknap County, New Hampshire, United States. It is located on the southern shore of Lake Winnipesaukee. The cruise ship Mount Washington terminates there. It is a popular destination of bikers during Motorcycle Week every June.

Weirs Beach, or "The Weirs" as it is referred to by locals, is named for a wide, sandy, public beach on Lake Winnipesaukee. Adjacent to the beach and comprising the center of the village are a boulevard and boardwalk that run along a quarter mile stretch of Lakeside Ave. The main summer port of the Winnipesaukee Flagship Company's MS Mount Washington is located on the boulevard. A large public dock is also evident at this popular stop for boaters on Lake Winnipesaukee. On the opposite side of the street are several seasonal arcades and vendors that have been located there for many years. The Winnipesaukee Pier juts out into the lake from the main boulevard. The pier was constructed in 1925 and was a bustling spot for many years attracting many of the most famous big band groups of the time.

The Weirs Beach area contains Funspot, Mount Washington Cruises, the Winnipesaukee Scenic Railroad, the Weirs Drive-In Theater, several other attractions, and various motels, cottage complexes, and condominiums. There are four marinas in the village for boat rentals, sales, storage, and maintenance.

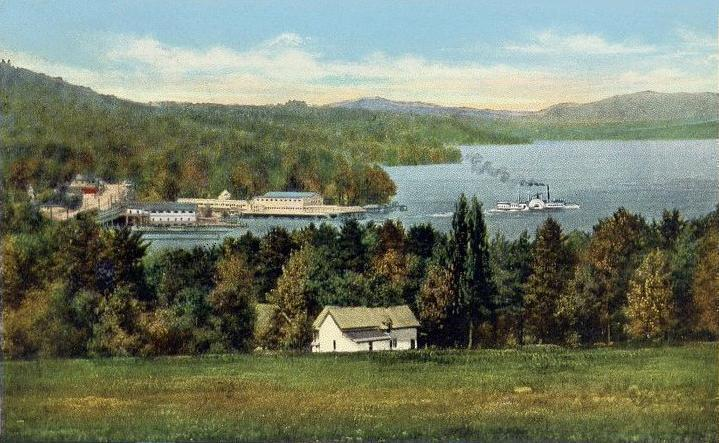
The Weirs c. 1920

Weirs Beach hosts a regular summer concert series and is the traditional focal point of Laconia Motorcycle Week.
