= Gale Memorial Library =

- U.S. National Register of Historic Places
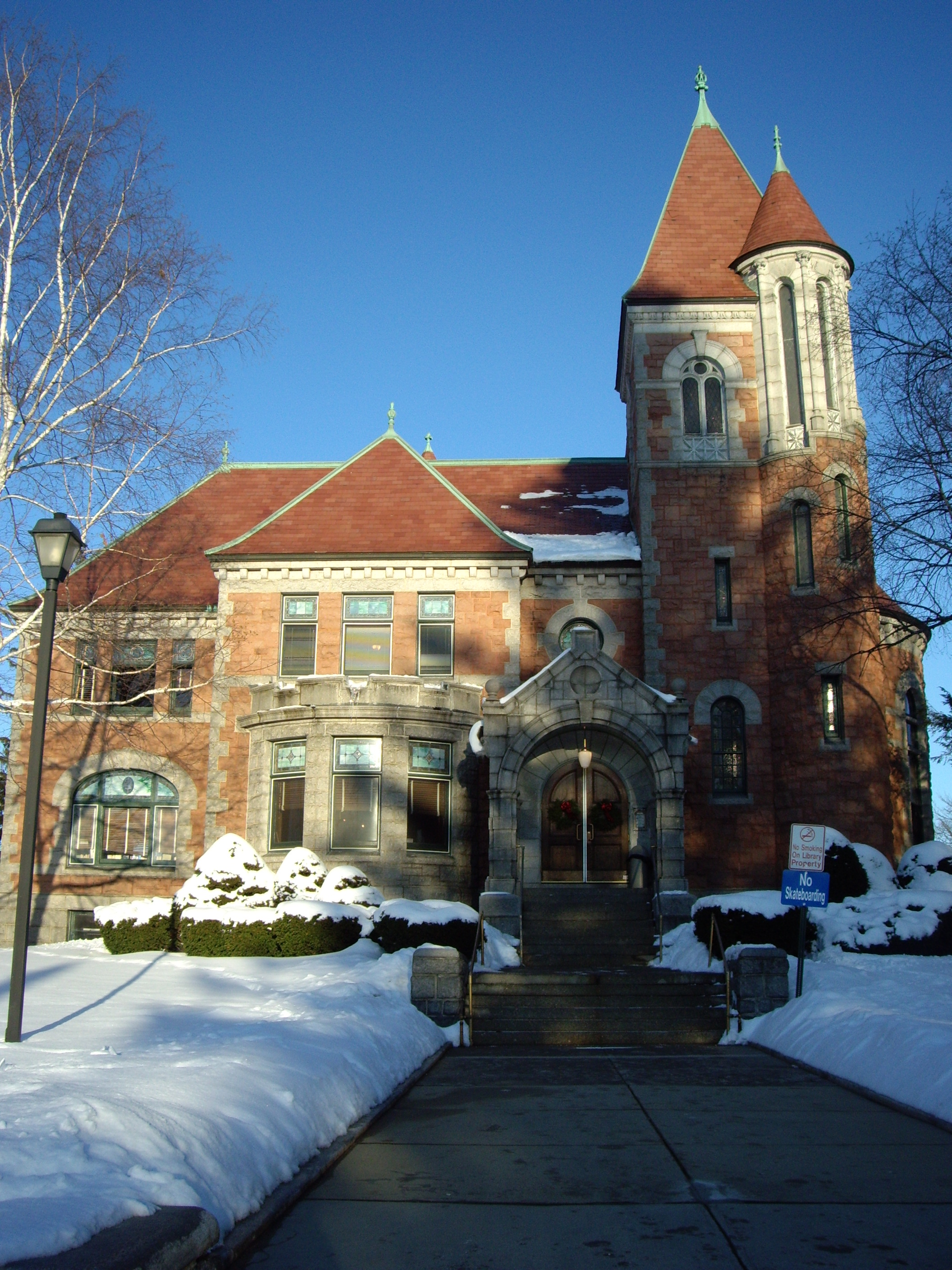

- Location within New Hampshire Location within the United States
- Location: 695 Main St., Laconia, New Hampshire
- Coordinates: 43°31′47″N 71°28′17″W
- Area: 1.8 acres (0.73 ha)
- Built: 1901
- Architect: Brigham, Charles
- Architectural style: Romanesque
- NRHP reference No.: 85002185
- Added to NRHP: September 12, 1985

The Gale Memorial Library is the public library of Laconia, New Hampshire. It is located at 695 Main Street in a Richardsonian Romanesque building, whose 1901–03 construction was funded by a bequest from Napoleon Bonaparte Gale, a local banker. The building was designed by Boston architect Charles Brigham, and is listed on the National Register of Historic Places.

== Architecture and history ==
Gale Memorial Library is located on the north side of downtown Laconia, occupying a generous landscaped parcel at the northeast corner of Main and Church streets. The original building is a roughly cruciform two-story masonry structure, built out of red New Brunswick granite with white Maine granite trim. It is covered by a tall hip roof, and has a rounded apse at the southern end. The front facade, facing Main Street, has a square tower at the right which has a rounded stair projection at one corner, each separately roofed by pyramidal and conical roofs respectively. The entrance is set next to the tower, projecting under an arched shelter. To its left is a projecting hip-roof section, fronted by a bowed single-story projection with parapet.

Laconia's public library was authorized by the town in 1878 and opened in 1879 in a downtown commercial space. After several moves, it moved into this building in 1903. It was built through a bequest from Napoleon Bonaparte Gale, whose will included provisions giving the city $25,000 for public amenities, including $10,000 for the library. It also included provisions for using more of the estate for the library, should costs require it. In all, $60,000 was spent on the library grounds and building. It was designed by Charles Brigham of Boston, and is one of the most impressive examples of Romanesque architecture in the state. The 1957 addition, which added a children's room, auditorium, and workroom, was designed by Prescott & Erickson. Executed in brick and with simpler styling, it is sited to leave major views of the original building intact.

== See also ==
- National Register of Historic Places listings in Belknap County, New Hampshire
