= Laconia, New Hampshire =

City in New Hampshire, United States

- City
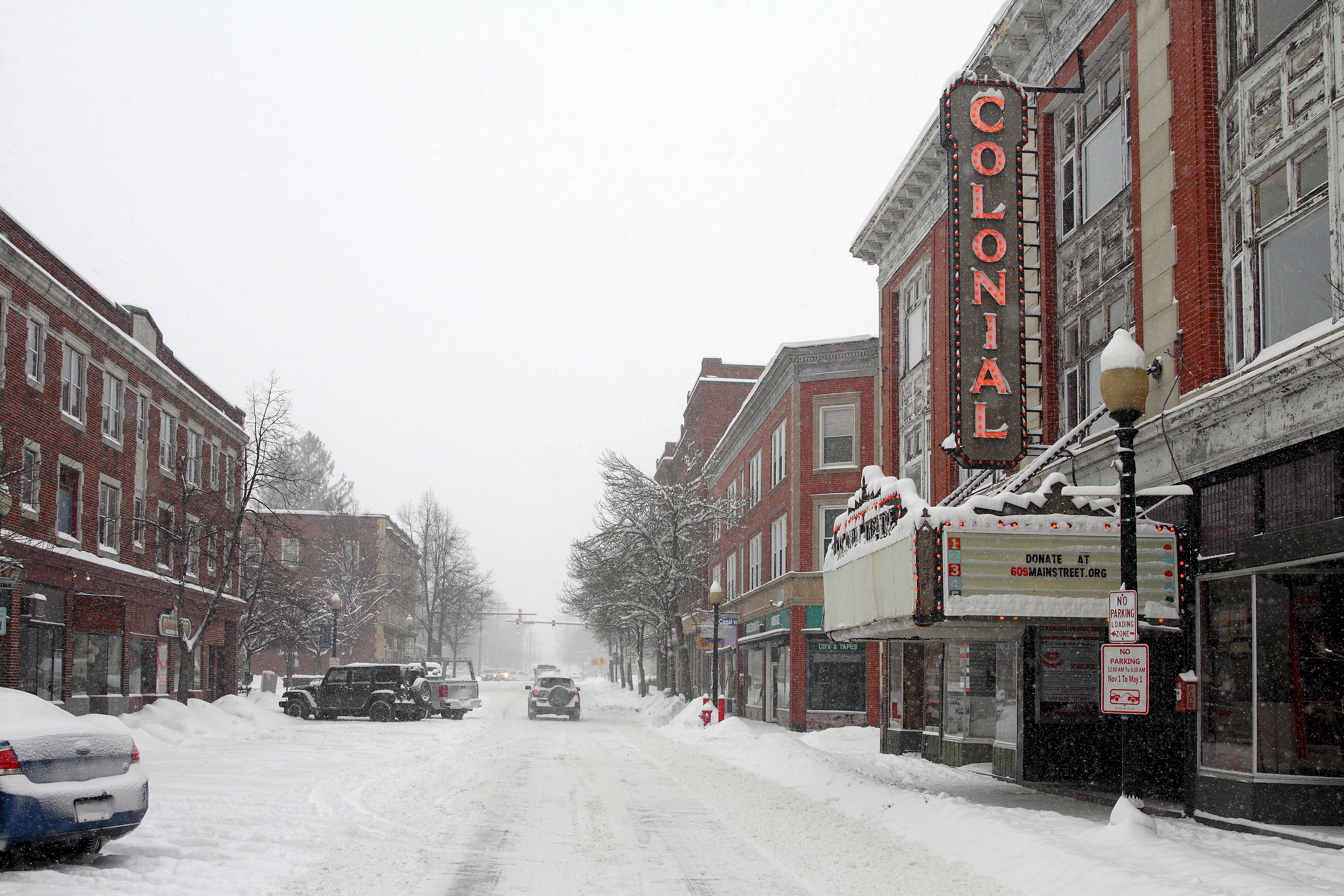
- Main Street in Laconia

- Flag Seal
- Motto: City on the Lakes
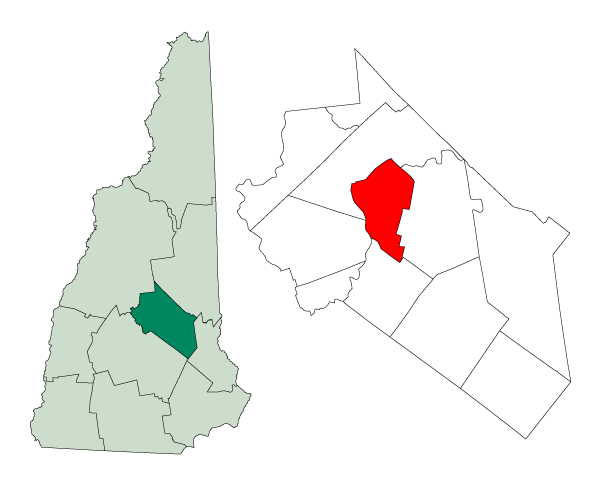
- Location in Belknap County, New Hampshire
- Coordinates: 43°34′21″N 71°28′39″W
- Country: United States
- State: New Hampshire
- County: Belknap
- Incorporated: 1855
- Named for: Laconia, Greece
- Villages: Downtown; Lakeport; Weirs Beach

Government
  - Type: Council–manager government

Area
  - Total: 26.08 sq mi (67.55 km^{2})
  - Land: 19.84 sq mi (51.38 km^{2})
  - Water: 6.24 sq mi (16.17 km^{2}) 23.93%
- Elevation: 587 ft (179 m)

Population (2020)
  - Total: 16,871
  - Density: 850.4/sq mi (328.35/km^{2})
- Time zone: UTC−5 (Eastern)
  - Summer (DST): UTC−4 (Eastern)
- ZIP Codes: 03246, 03247
- Area code: 603
- FIPS code: 33-40180
- GNIS feature ID: 873639
- Website: www.laconianh.gov

Laconia (/ləˈkoʊniə/ lə-KOHN-ee-ə) is a city in Belknap County, New Hampshire, United States. The population was 16,871 at the 2020 census, and an estimated 17,246 in 2025, up from 15,951 at the 2010 census. It is the county seat of Belknap County. Laconia, situated between Lake Winnipesaukee and Lake Winnisquam, includes the villages of Lakeport and Weirs Beach. Each June, the city hosts Laconia Motorcycle Week, also known as "Bike Week," one of the country's largest motorcycle rallies.

== Name ==
Laconia is named after the Greek region of Laconia (Greek: Λακωνία, Lakonía, Greek pronunciation: [lakoˈni.a]) in the southeastern part of the Peloponnese peninsula.

== History ==
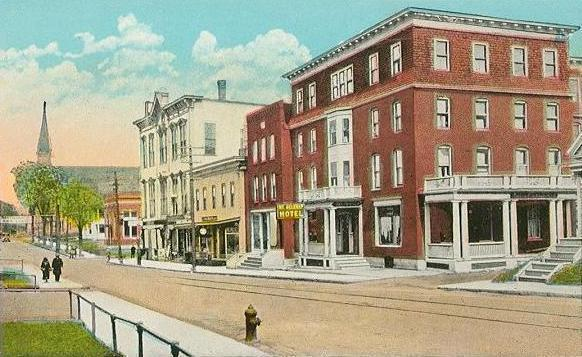
Webster Square, c. 1915

A large Abenaki Indian settlement called Aquadoctan once existed at the point now known as The Weirs, named by colonists for fishing weirs discovered at the outlet of the Winnipesaukee River. Early explorers had hoped to follow the Piscataqua River north to Lake Champlain in search of the great lakes and rivers of Canada mentioned in Indian folklore. About 1652, the Endicott surveying party visited the area, an event commemorated by Endicott Rock, a local landmark. A fort would be built at Laconia in 1746. But ongoing hostilities between the English, French, and their respective Native American allies prevented settlement until 1761, after which it remained for many years a part of Meredith and Gilford called Meredith Bridge.

Beginning in 1765, lumber and grist mills were established on Mill Street, with taverns built soon thereafter on Parade Street. About 1822, the courthouse was built, which would become county seat at the creation of Belknap County in 1840. In 1823, the Belknap Mill was built to manufacture textiles; in operation by 1828, the structure is today a museum listed on the National Register of Historic Places and is the oldest unaltered brick textile mill in the country. Local industry produced lumber, textiles, shoes, hosiery, knitting machinery and needles. But the city's largest employer would be the Laconia Car Company, builder of rail, trolley and subway cars. Started in 1848, it lasted until the 1930s. The railroad entered town in 1849, carrying both freight and an increasing number of summer tourists to popular Weirs Beach.

In 1855, Laconia was incorporated as a town from land in Meredith Bridge, Lakeport, Weirs and part of Gilmanton. The name was probably derived from the old Laconia Company, formed by Captain John Mason and the Masonian Proprietors to sell parcels of land during the colonial era. The Great Fire of 1860 destroyed most of Main Street from Mill to Water streets, followed by the Great Lakeport Fire of 1903, a blaze so fierce that fire companies were brought by train from as far away as Dover. Laconia was incorporated as a city in 1893.

By the mid-1800s, Laconia was a hub for railroads and steamboats, bringing tourists to the lakes and mountains. The Laconia Car Company, which built rail and trolley cars, was the city’s largest employer until the 1930s.

== Geography ==
Laconia is located northwest of the geographic center of Belknap County. The city lies at the center of New Hampshire's Lakes Region, and all or part of four major bodies of water lie within its limits: Lake Winnipesaukee, Lake Winnisquam, Opechee Bay and Paugus Bay (sometimes counted as an arm of Winnipesaukee, but historically a separate body of water).

Laconia contains three main villages. Downtown Laconia, where the Belknap County Courthouse is located, can be found in the southern tip of the city, along the Winnipesaukee River between Opechee Bay to the north and Lake Winnisquam to the southwest. Lakeport, located between Opeechee Bay and Paugus Bay, is near the geographic center of the city. Weirs Beach, around the channel connecting Paugus Bay with Lake Winnipesaukee, lies at the northern edge of the city.

U.S. Route 3 passes through parts of the city, bypassing downtown but passing through Weirs Beach. New Hampshire Route 11 bypasses the city in a concurrency with US 3. The two highways lead southwest from Laconia to Tilton and Franklin. New Hampshire Route 11A represents the old routes 11 and 3 through downtown as Court Street and Union Avenue, but then turns east on Gilford Avenue to lead to Gilford and West Alton. New Hampshire Route 106 runs north-south through downtown, leading south to Concord and north to Meredith. New Hampshire Route 107 leads southeast from downtown towards Gilmanton and Pittsfield. Route 107 turns north in downtown and follows Union Avenue (former Route 3) to a junction with US 3 near the north end of the Laconia Bypass. US 3 continues north along the east shore of Paugus Bay, through Weirs Beach and into Meredith. Route 11 leads east from the Laconia Bypass past Glendale and into Alton. New Hampshire Route 11B leads east from Weirs Beach into Gilford.

The former Boston and Maine Railroad White Mountain Branch, originally built as the Boston, Concord & Montreal Railroad, enters Laconia at the Belmont town line near Lake Winnisquam and runs north through the city, through Lakeport and along Paugus Bay to Weirs Beach and Meredith. Purchased by the State of New Hampshire in 1975, the tracks are actively used for freight purposes by the New England Southern Railroad and for tourist train service by the Plymouth & Lincoln Railroad between Meredith and Lakeport, with occasional service out of Laconia. The line is also a vital active link to the National rail network for the tourist operator to ship and receive equipment for their own use and to perform contract work at the railroad's Lincoln repair shops.

Laconia Municipal Airport is located just east of the city limits in Gilford.

A recreational trail called the W.O.W. Trail (Winnipesaukee–Opechee–Winnisquam) links several parts of the city, following the railroad tracks from Lake Winnisquam, skirting the downtown area, and running to Lakeport. A desire to extend the trail to Weirs Beach has been contested by residents in private communities abutting the rail corridor. The proposed removal of active rail for said extension is contested also by railroad companies actively using the tracks and the State of New Hampshire Bureau of Rail and Transit.

According to the United States Census Bureau, the city has a total area of 26.1 square miles (67.6 km^{2}), of which 19.8 square miles (51.4 km^{2}) are land and 6.3 square miles (16.2 km^{2}) are water, comprising 23.93% of the city. Laconia is drained by the Winnipesaukee River. It is bounded in the southwest by Lake Winnisquam, and by Lake Winnipesaukee in the northeast. Laconia lies fully within the Merrimack River watershed. The highest point in Laconia is a 960-foot (290 m) hill in the northern part of the city, west of Paugus Bay's Pickerel Cove and just east of Route 106.

=== Adjacent municipalities ===
- Meredith (north)
- Gilford (east)
- Belmont (south)
- Sanbornton (west)

=== Climate ===
Climate data for Laconia, New Hampshire (Lakeport 2) (1991–2020 normals, extremes 1938–present)
Month	Jan	Feb	Mar	Apr	May	Jun	Jul	Aug	Sep	Oct	Nov	Dec	Year
Record high °F (°C)	64 (18)	69 (21)	82 (28)	92 (33)	95 (35)	96 (36)	98 (37)	100 (38)	95 (35)	83 (28)	75 (24)	69 (21)	100 (38)
Mean daily maximum °F (°C)	30.3 (−0.9)	33.7 (0.9)	42.5 (5.8)	55.6 (13.1)	68.0 (20.0)	76.6 (24.8)	82.1 (27.8)	80.8 (27.1)	73.3 (22.9)	60.1 (15.6)	47.3 (8.5)	36.2 (2.3)	57.2 (14.0)
Daily mean °F (°C)	21.0 (−6.1)	23.1 (−4.9)	31.8 (−0.1)	44.1 (6.7)	56.3 (13.5)	65.7 (18.7)	71.3 (21.8)	69.8 (21.0)	62.4 (16.9)	50.0 (10.0)	38.7 (3.7)	28.2 (−2.1)	46.9 (8.3)
Mean daily minimum °F (°C)	11.7 (−11.3)	12.5 (−10.8)	21.2 (−6.0)	32.7 (0.4)	44.5 (6.9)	54.8 (12.7)	60.4 (15.8)	58.7 (14.8)	51.5 (10.8)	39.9 (4.4)	30.0 (−1.1)	20.2 (−6.6)	36.5 (2.5)
Record low °F (°C)	−24 (−31)	−17 (−27)	−11 (−24)	12 (−11)	24 (−4)	38 (3)	45 (7)	40 (4)	30 (−1)	23 (−5)	4 (−16)	−13 (−25)	−24 (−31)
Average precipitation inches (mm)	3.08 (78)	2.88 (73)	3.39 (86)	3.65 (93)	3.47 (88)	4.44 (113)	4.61 (117)	3.89 (99)	3.77 (96)	4.83 (123)	3.68 (93)	3.92 (100)	45.61 (1,158)
Average snowfall inches (cm)	18.8 (48)	16.9 (43)	9.4 (24)	1.6 (4.1)	0.0 (0.0)	0.0 (0.0)	0.0 (0.0)	0.0 (0.0)	0.0 (0.0)	0.3 (0.76)	2.1 (5.3)	12.8 (33)	61.9 (157)
Average precipitation days (≥ 0.01 in)	11.7	9.2	10.8	11.2	12.1	12.6	11.4	10.0	9.8	11.2	10.7	11.6	132.3
Average snowy days (≥ 0.1 in)	7.4	6.0	4.0	0.8	0.0	0.0	0.0	0.0	0.0	0.1	1.0	4.9	24.2
Source: NOAA

== Demographics ==
Historical population
Census	Pop.	Note	%±
1860	1,806		—
1870	2,309		27.9%
1880	3,790		64.1%
1890	6,143		62.1%
1900	8,042		30.9%
1910	10,183		26.6%
1920	10,897		7.0%
1930	12,471		14.4%
1940	13,484		8.1%
1950	14,745		9.4%
1960	15,288		3.7%
1970	14,888		−2.6%
1980	15,575		4.6%
1990	15,743		1.1%
2000	16,411		4.2%
2010	15,951		−2.8%
2020	16,871		5.8%
2024 (est.)	17,310		2.6%
U.S. Decennial Census

=== 2020 census ===
As of the 2020 census, Laconia had a population of 16,871. The median age was 47.5 years. 17.5% of residents were under the age of 18, and 24.1% were 65 years of age or older. For every 100 females, there were 94.8 males; for every 100 females age 18 and over, there were 91.7 males age 18 and over.

95.0% of residents lived in urban areas, while 5.0% lived in rural areas.

There were 7,550 households, of which 21.7% had children under the age of 18 living in them. Of all households, 39.9% were married-couple households, 20.6% were households with a male householder and no spouse or partner present, and 29.6% were households with a female householder and no spouse or partner present. About 34.6% of all households were made up of individuals, and 15.8% had someone living alone who was 65 years of age or older.

There were 10,275 housing units, of which 26.5% were vacant. The homeowner vacancy rate was 1.3%, and the rental vacancy rate was 5.2%.

Racial composition as of the 2020 census
Race	Number	Percent
White	15,346	91.0%
Black or African American	203	1.2%
American Indian and Alaska Native	55	0.3%
Asian	235	1.4%
Native Hawaiian and Other Pacific Islander	6	0.0%
Some other race	106	0.6%
Two or more races	920	5.5%
Hispanic or Latino (of any race)	457	2.7%

=== 2000 census ===
As of the 2000 census, there were 16,411 people, 6,724 households, and 4,168 families residing in the city. The population density was 809.3 inhabitants per square mile (312.5/km^{2}). There were 8,554 housing units at an average density of 421.8 per square mile (162.9/km^{2}). The racial makeup of the city was 96.79% White, 0.55% African American, 0.41% Native American, 0.73% Asian, 0.02% Pacific Islander, 0.27% from other races, and 1.22% from two or more races. Hispanic or Latino of any race were 0.99% of the population.

There were 6,724 households, out of which 28.0% had children under the age of 18 living with them, 46.4% were married couples living together, 11.2% had a female householder with no husband present, and 38.0% were non-families. 30.3% of all households were made up of individuals, and 12.3% had someone living alone who was 65 years of age or older. The average household size was 2.32, and the average family size was 2.87.

In the city, the population was spread out, with 22.3% under the age of 18, 8.8% from 18 to 24, 28.1% from 25 to 44, 23.5% from 45 to 64, and 17.2% who were 65 years of age or older. The median age was 39 years. For every 100 females, there were 94.4 males. For every 100 females age 18 and over, there were 92.2 males.

The median income for a household in the city was $37,796, and the median income for a family was $45,307. Males had a median income of $31,714 versus $22,818 for females. The per capita income for the city was $19,540. About 7.5% of families and 8.9% of the population were below the poverty line, including 10.9% of those under age 18 and 5.3% of those age 65 or over.

== Government ==
Laconia city vote by party in presidential elections
Year	GOP	DEM	Others
2020	52.04% 4,642	46.42% 4,141	1.54% 137
2016	53.02% 4,303	40.70% 3,303	6.28% 510
2012	48.95% 3,859	49.95% 3,938	1.10% 87
2008	46.83% 3,750	52.67% 4,218	0.50% 40
2004	54.53% 4,286	44.67% 3,511	0.80% 63
2000	53.76% 3,814	42.49% 3,015	3.75% 266
1996	45.21% 2,842	45.58% 2,865	9.21% 579
1992	43.68% 3,033	34.42% 2,390	21.89% 1,520

Laconia is governed by a mayor-council and city manager system. The Mayor and council are elected in a citywide vote, while the city manager is hired by the council. The council consists of six members who are elected from the six single-member wards.

In the New Hampshire Senate, Laconia is in the 7th district, represented by Republican Harold F. French. On the New Hampshire Executive Council, Laconia is in the 1st district, represented by Republican Joseph Kenney. In the United States House of Representatives, Laconia is in New Hampshire's 1st congressional district, represented by Democrat Chris Pappas.

Laconia leans Republican, but has occasionally voted for Democratic candidates.

== Education ==
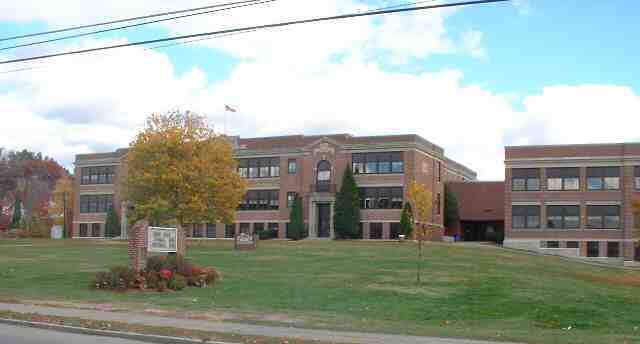
Laconia High School, seen from Union Ave.

Laconia's public school system is run by the Laconia School District, School Administrative Unit 30.

Public schools

Laconia School District has one public high school, one middle school and three elementary schools:

- Laconia High School
- Laconia Middle School (formerly Memorial Middle School)
- Elm Street Elementary School
- Pleasant Street Elementary School
- Woodland Heights Elementary School

Private schools

There are two parochial schools within the city limits of Laconia:

- Laconia Christian Academy, serving grades K–12
- Holy Trinity Catholic School, serving grades K–8

Post-secondary schools

There is one area institution of higher education, with a total enrollment of approximately 1,000 students:

- Lakes Region Community College

== Culture ==
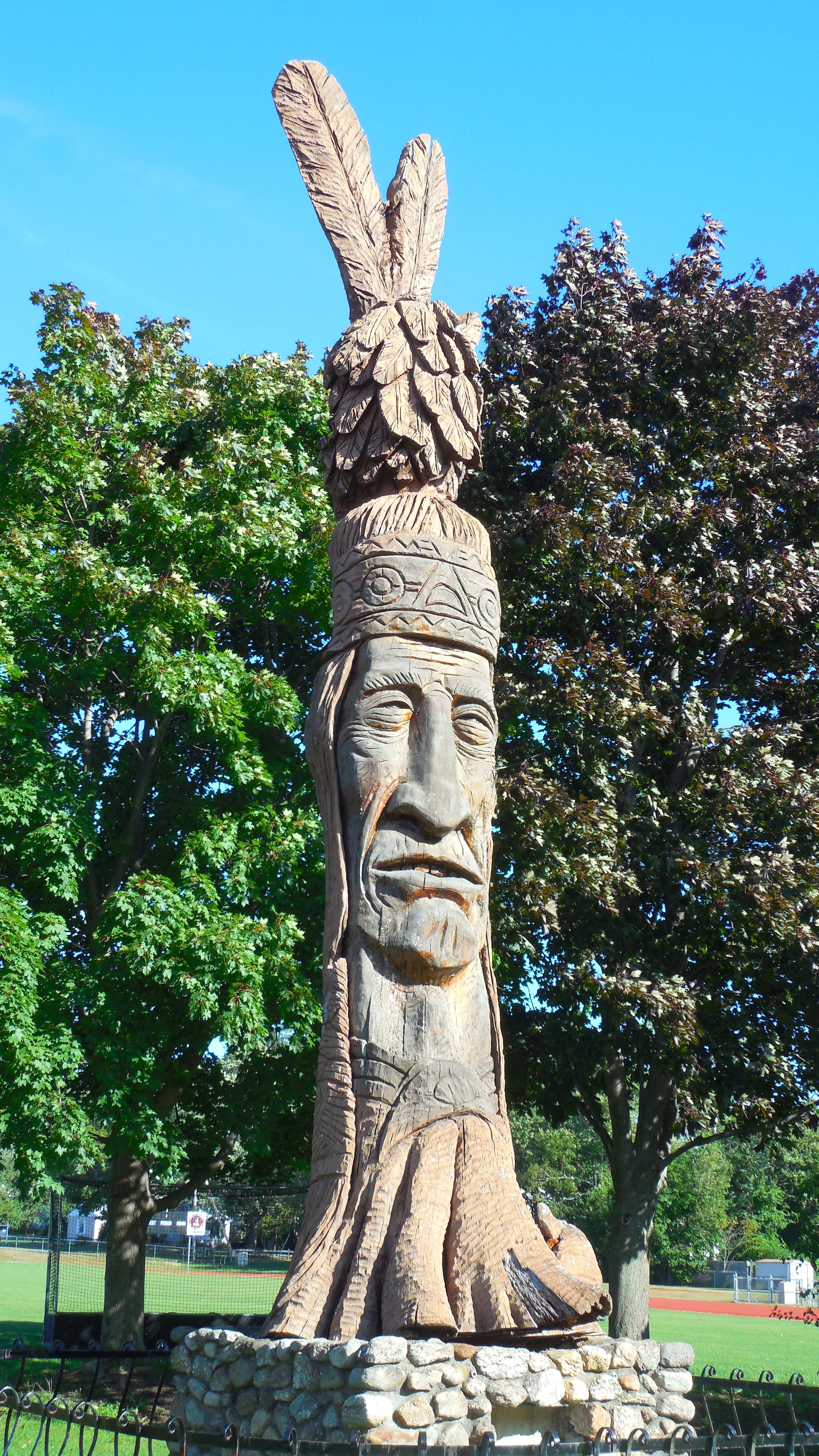
Memorial of Keewakwa Abenaki Keenahbeh in Opechee Park, which stands at a height of 36 ft (11 m). More than 3,000 people attended the dedication ceremonies in September 1984, including an estimated 100 members of the Pennacook tribe.

=== Sports ===
Laconia is home to the Winnipesaukee Muskrats of the New England Collegiate Baseball League (NECBL). The franchise began play in 2010 at Robbie Mills Field in Laconia.

The New England Wolves are a Tier III junior ice hockey team playing in the Eastern Hockey League (2013–). The team plays their home games at the Merrill Fay Arena located in Laconia.

Each winter, the city hosts the Laconia World Championship Sled Dog Derby.

=== Theater ===
Laconia is home to the Colonial Theatre, the CAKE Theatre, and the Lakeport Opera House.

=== Laconia Motorcycle Week ===
One of the largest motorcycle rallies in the world takes place in Laconia during nine days in June, ending on Father's Day. Founded in 1923, attendance was 375,000 in 2004 and 188,000 in 2010. Events include races, shows, and a motorcycle hill climb competition.

=== Laconia Multicultural Festival ===
Held annually, the Laconia Multicultural Festival is a community event that highlights the music, arts, crafts and cuisine of cultural artists. The festival was created by former Mayor Matthew Lahey and former Police Chief Bill Baker in 2000.

=== New Hampshire Pumpkin Festival ===
After the city council of Keene, New Hampshire, rejected the permit for their annual Pumpkin Festival to be held there following riots in the city's neighborhoods in 2014, it was announced that Laconia would host the festival for the city's first time in 2015. The twenty-fifth New Hampshire Pumpkin Fest was held on October 24, 2015, with fewer than ten thousand jack-o'-lanterns lit. The festival has continued to be held in Laconia annually since.

== Sites of interest ==
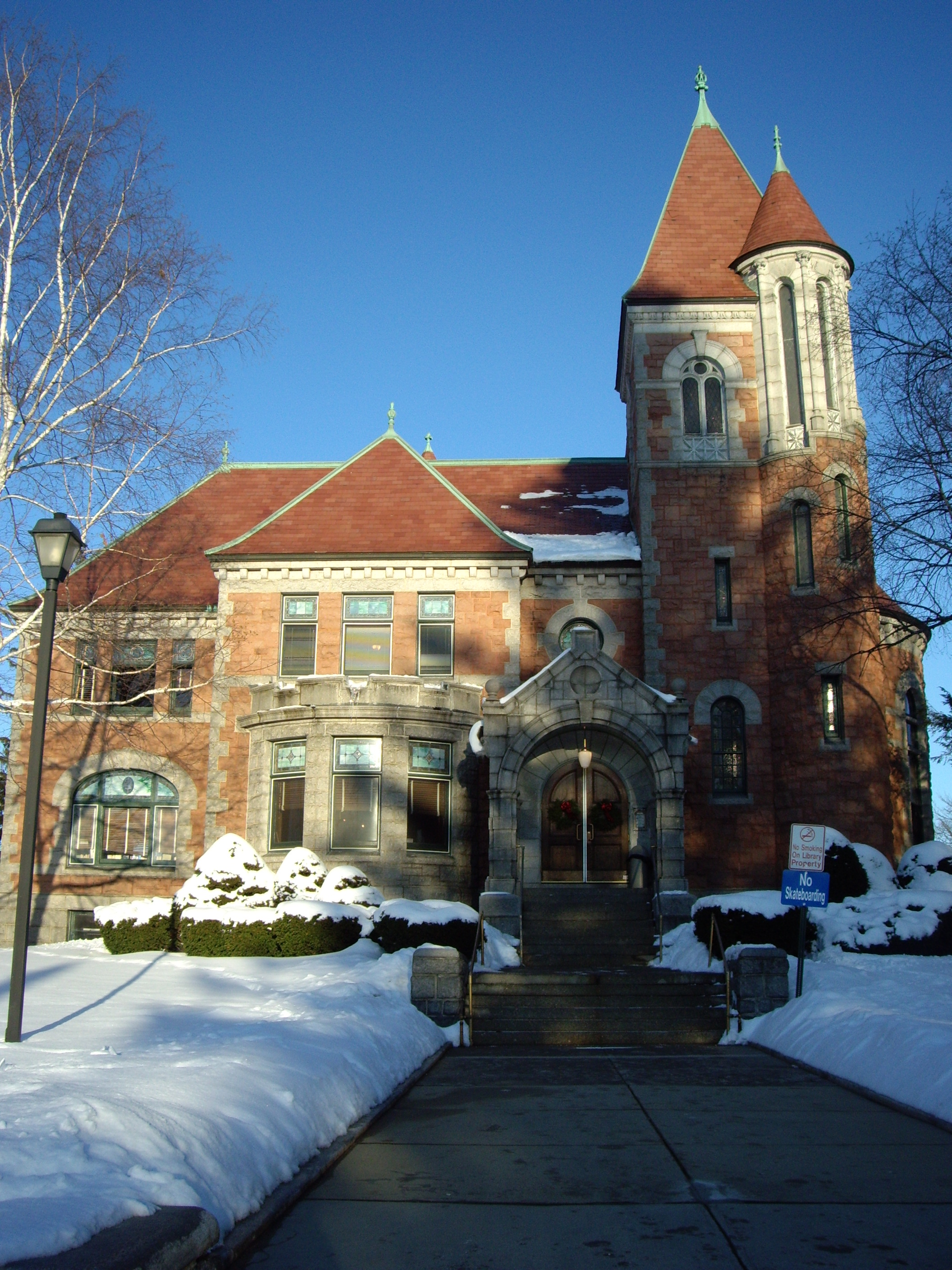
Gale Memorial Library

- Funspot Family Fun Center, named "Largest Arcade in the World" by Guinness World Records; home of the International Classic Video & Pinball Tournament
- Lake Winnipesaukee Historical Society Museum
- Robbie Mills Field, home of the Winnipesaukee Muskrats of the New England Collegiate Baseball League
- Weirs Beach

The city has multiple sites listed in the National Register of Historic Places:

- Belknap-Sulloway Mill, now the Belknap Mill Museum
- John W. Busiel House
- Busiel-Seeburg Mill
- Colonial Theatre Complex
- Evangelical Baptist Church
- Federal Building
- Gale Memorial Library
- Laconia District Court
- Laconia Passenger Station
- U.S. Post Office-Laconia Main
- Ossian Wilbur Goss Reading Room
- United Baptist Church of Lakeport
- Endicott Rock
- New Hampshire Veterans' Association Historic District
- The Weirs

== In popular culture ==
The Jack Reacher novel Past Tense (2018) was set in and around Laconia.

== Notable people ==
- Richard W. Bastraw (1934–2025), member of the New Hampshire House of Representatives
- Donald C. Bolduc (born 1962), U.S. Army brigadier general and U.S. Senate candidate; born in Laconia
- Charles A. Busiel (1842–1901), 45th Governor of New Hampshire; mayor of Laconia
- Pearl Chertok (1918–1981), professional harpist and composer; born in Laconia
- Connie Converse (born 1924), disappeared singer-songwriter
- Werner Doehner (1929–2019), General Electric engineer who was the last survivor of the 1937 Hindenburg disaster
- Chas Guldemond (born 1987), snowboarder; two-time bronze medalist in the X Games
- Doris Haddock (1910–2010), activist known as "Granny D"; walked across the US to advocate for campaign finance reform
- Fletcher Hale (1883–1931), U.S. congressman, served 1925–1931
- John Adams Harper (1779–1816), U.S. congressman, served 1811–1813
- Martin Alonzo Haynes (1842–1919), U.S. congressman, served 1883–1887
- Ellery Albee Hibbard (1826–1903), U.S. congressman, served 1871–1873
- Joseph Oliva Huot (1917–1983), U.S. congressman, served 1965–1967, born in Laconia
- Tony Lavelli (1926–1998), basketball player with the Boston Celtics and New York Knicks
- Thomas J. McIntyre (1915–1992), U.S. senator, served 1962–1979, born in Laconia
- Penny Pitou (born 1938), first U.S. Olympic skier to win a medal in an Olympic downhill event
- Claude Rains (1889–1967), actor; died in Laconia
- Paul W. K. Rothemund (born c. 1972), recipient of a MacArthur Fellowship in 2007
- Daniel E. Somes (1815–1888), U.S. congressman from Maine, served 1856–1858
- Dawn Zimmer (born 1968), mayor of Hoboken, New Jersey, served 2009–2017

== Gallery ==
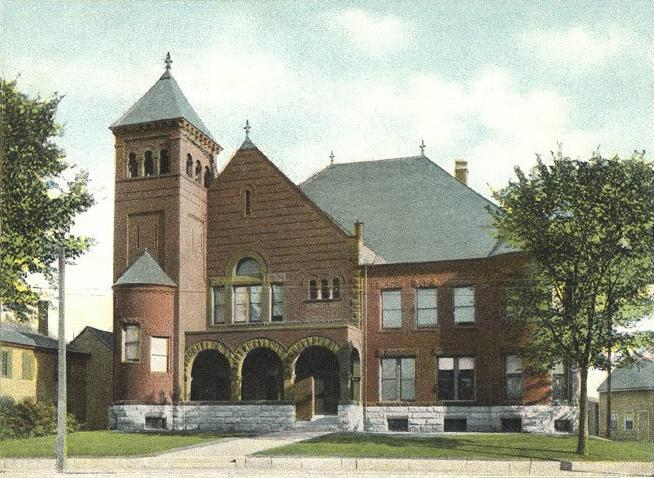
Courthouse, 1906

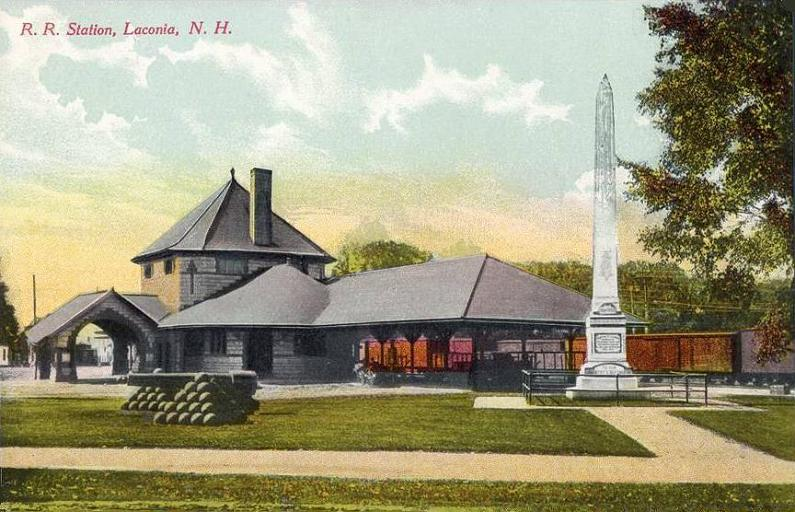
Railroad station, c. 1910

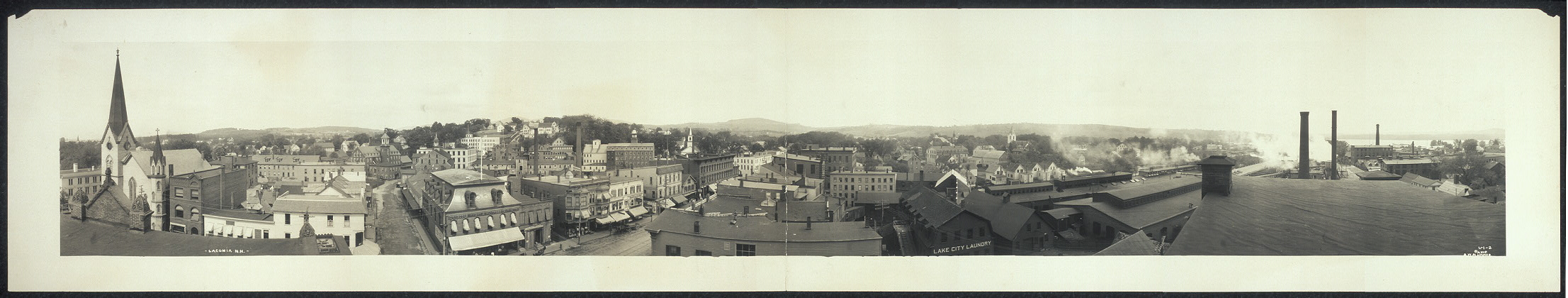
Panorama of central business district, c. 1910

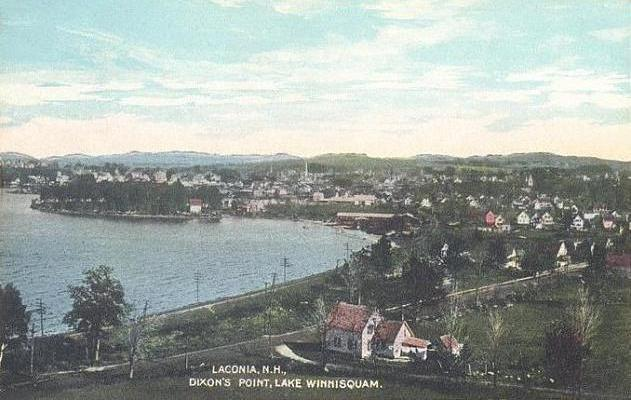
Bird's-eye view of Laconia, c. 1911

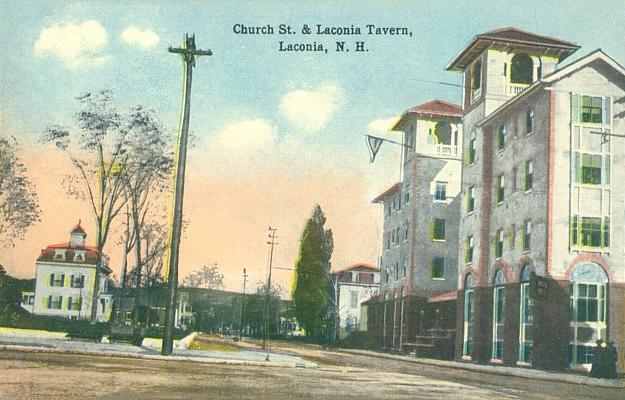
Church Street, c. 1912

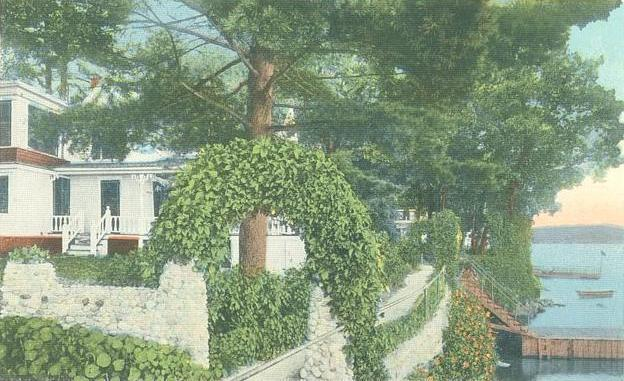
Shore Path, c. 1915

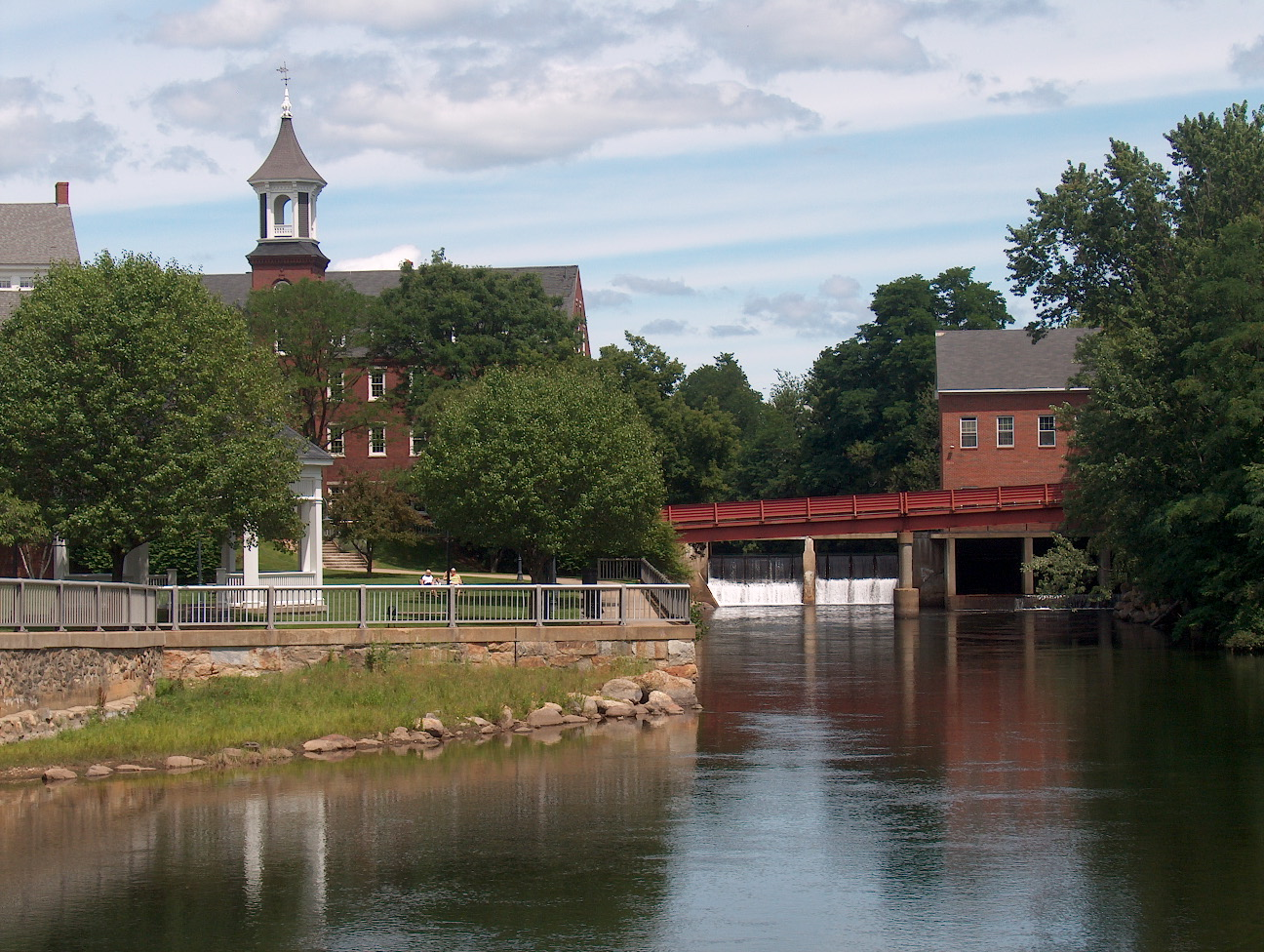
Belknap Mills in downtown Laconia, 2008
