= Lake Winnipesaukee Ice-Out =

Annual date when the MS Mount Washington can visit its ports

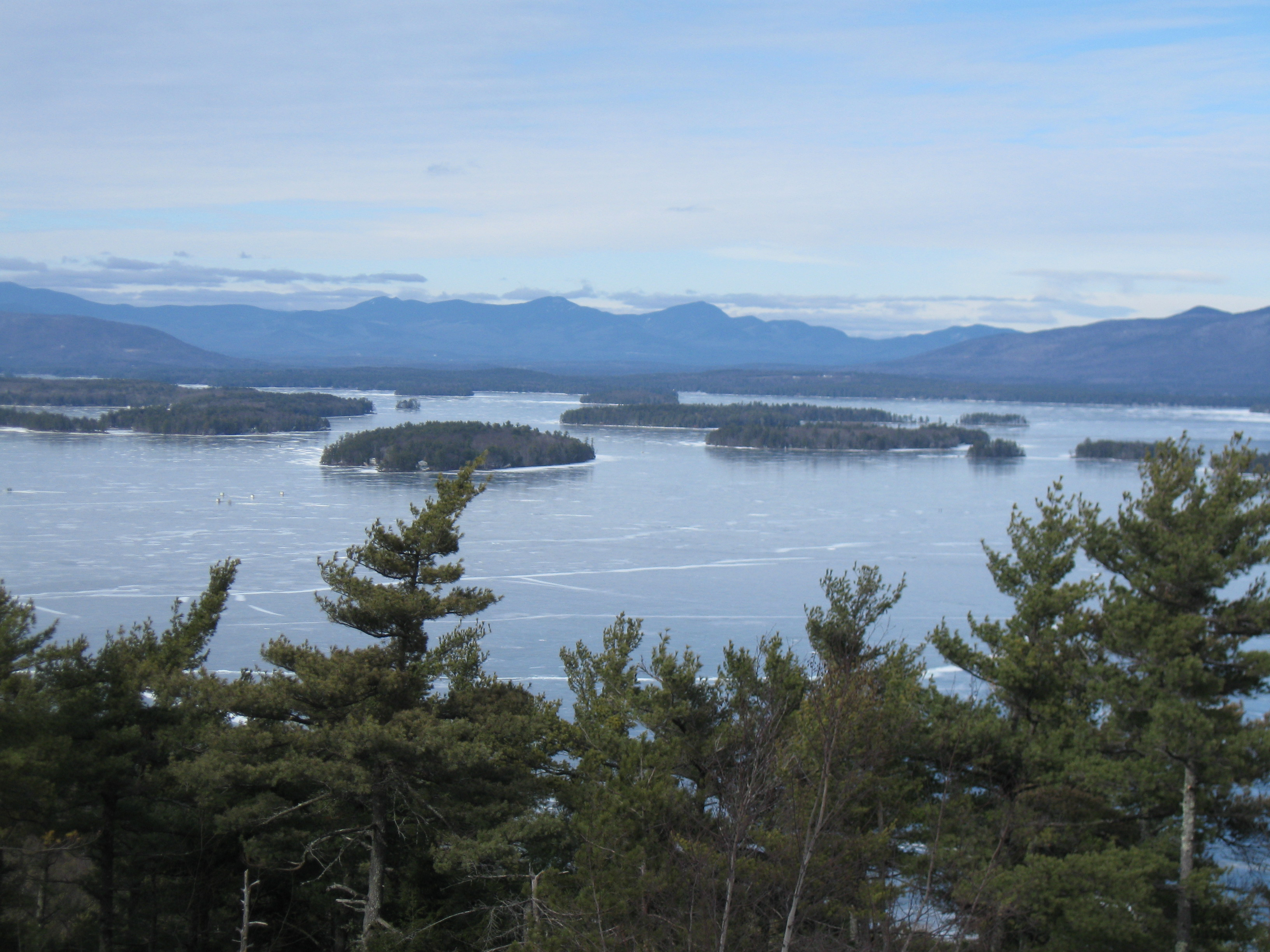
Ice-covered Lake Winnipesaukee, February 2010, looking north towards the Sandwich Range

Lake Winnipesaukee Ice-Out occurs when all the ice on Lake Winnipesaukee, the largest lake in New Hampshire, United States, has broken up after winter. Over the years this has been decided upon by a variety of means; as of 2018, Dave Emerson makes the call. Emerson flies two to three times a day over Lake Winnipesaukee to check on the ice. Ice-Out is declared when the MS Mount Washington can make it to every one of her ports: Center Harbor, Wolfeboro, Alton, Weirs Beach and Meredith. It is also considered the unofficial start to the boating season as well as the end of winter in New Hampshire. The earliest recorded ice-out occurred in 2024 on March 17, beating the previous record of March 18, 2016 and March 23, 2012. The latest ice out occurred in 1888 on May 12.

Because the Ice-Out designation is based on the judgment of one person, it is unscientific. The call does not mean that the lake is entirely devoid of ice, nor does it mean that the MS Mount Washington actually does go to each of her ports. It simply means that it is believed that the ship could.

== History ==
Ice-Out records have been kept since 1887 as a way to keep track of when both commercial and passenger transportation lanes became usable in the lake. In 1974, Dr. William K. Widgert compiled data from known records to create a list of past dates.

Originally the Ice-Out designation was decided by people on shore. Later, for roughly 50 years, the call was made by Bob Aldrich, then, starting in the early 1980s, it was called by Alan Emerson. Since his death in 2002 it has been exclusively called by his son Dave, except in 2003 when it was declared by flight instructor Steve Sydorwicz.

Ice-Out has occurred earlier on average in the last two decades of the 20th century and the first of the 21st century than in preceding decades.

== Contests ==
There are two contests where the public can bet on when Ice-Out will occur on the lake. One is run by Public Service of New Hampshire and the other by Winnipesaukee.com.

== Ice-Out dates ==
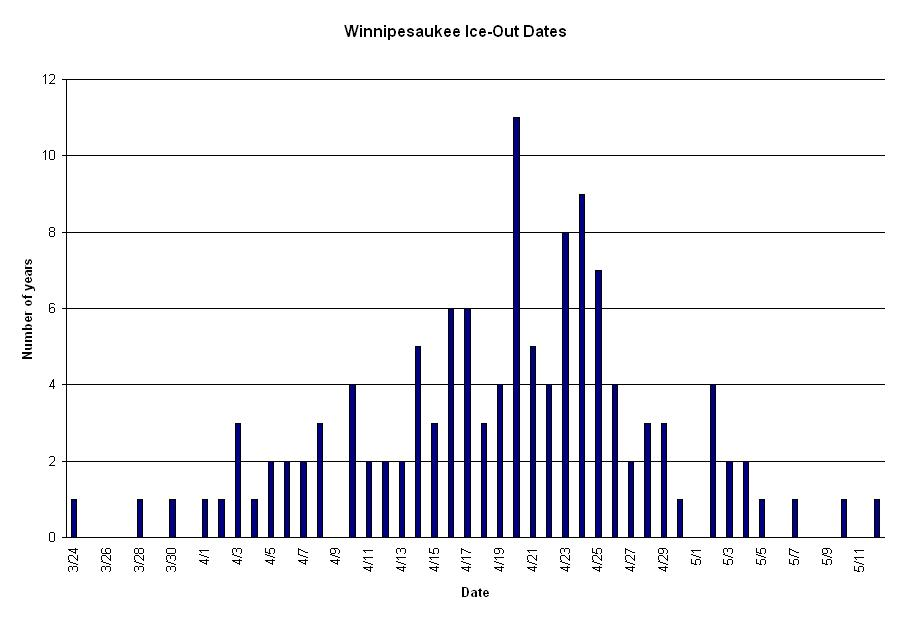
A chart detailing the cumulative number of all past Ice-Outs on each date

Year	Ice-Out date
1887	May 7
1888	May 12
1889	April 14
1890	April 24
1891	April 23
1892	April 11
1893	May 10
1894	April 20
1895	April 26
1896	April 23
1897	April 23
1898	April 14
1899	May 2
1900	April 26
1901	April 20
1902	April 4
1903	April 2
1904	April 29
1905	April 24
1906	April 26
1907	April 29
1908	April 21
1909	April 19
1910	April 6
1911	May 2
1912	April 23
1913	April 17
1914	April 15
1915	April 24
1916	April 16
1917	April 28
1918	April 24
1919	April 14
1920	April 24
1921	March 28
1922	April 17
1923	April 24
1924	April 18
1925	April 10
1926	May 2
1927	April 13
1928	April 19
1929	April 18
1930	April 7
1931	April 11
1932	April 20
1933	April 25
1934	April 21
1935	April 21
1936	April 8
1937	April 25
1938	April 17
1939	May 4
1940	May 4
1941	April 16
1942	April 18
1943	April 30
1944	May 3
1945	April 1
1946	March 30
1947	April 24
1948	April 10
1949	April 8
1950	April 20
1951	April 14
1952	April 20
1953	April 3
1954	April 16
1955	April 19
1956	May 3
1957	April 3
1958	April 13
1959	April 26
1960	April 19
1961	April 27
1962	April 24
1963	April 20
1964	April 28
1965	April 22
1966	April 20
1967	April 20
1968	April 15
1969	April 25
1970	April 28
1971	May 6
1972	May 2
1973	April 16
1974	April 17
1975	April 25
1976	April 17
1977	April 21
1978	April 27
1979	April 25
1980	April 17
1981	April 5
1982	April 29
1983	April 10
1984	April 20
1985	April 14
1986	April 16
1987	April 12
1988	April 16
1989	April 25
1990	April 22
1991	April 8
1992	April 21
1993	April 22
1994	April 23
1995	April 15
1996	April 17
1997	April 24
1998	April 7
1999	April 8
2000	April 10
2001	May 2
2002	April 5
2003	April 25
2004	April 20
2005	April 20
2006	April 3
2007	April 23
2008	April 23
2009	April 12
2010	March 24
2011	April 19
2012	March 23
2013	April 17
2014	April 23
2015	April 24
2016	March 18
2017	April 17
2018	April 26
2019	April 24
2020	April 6
2021	April 5
2022	April 8
2023	April 7
2024	March 17
2025	April 16
