= Plymouth & Lincoln Railroad =

Railroad in New Hampshire, US

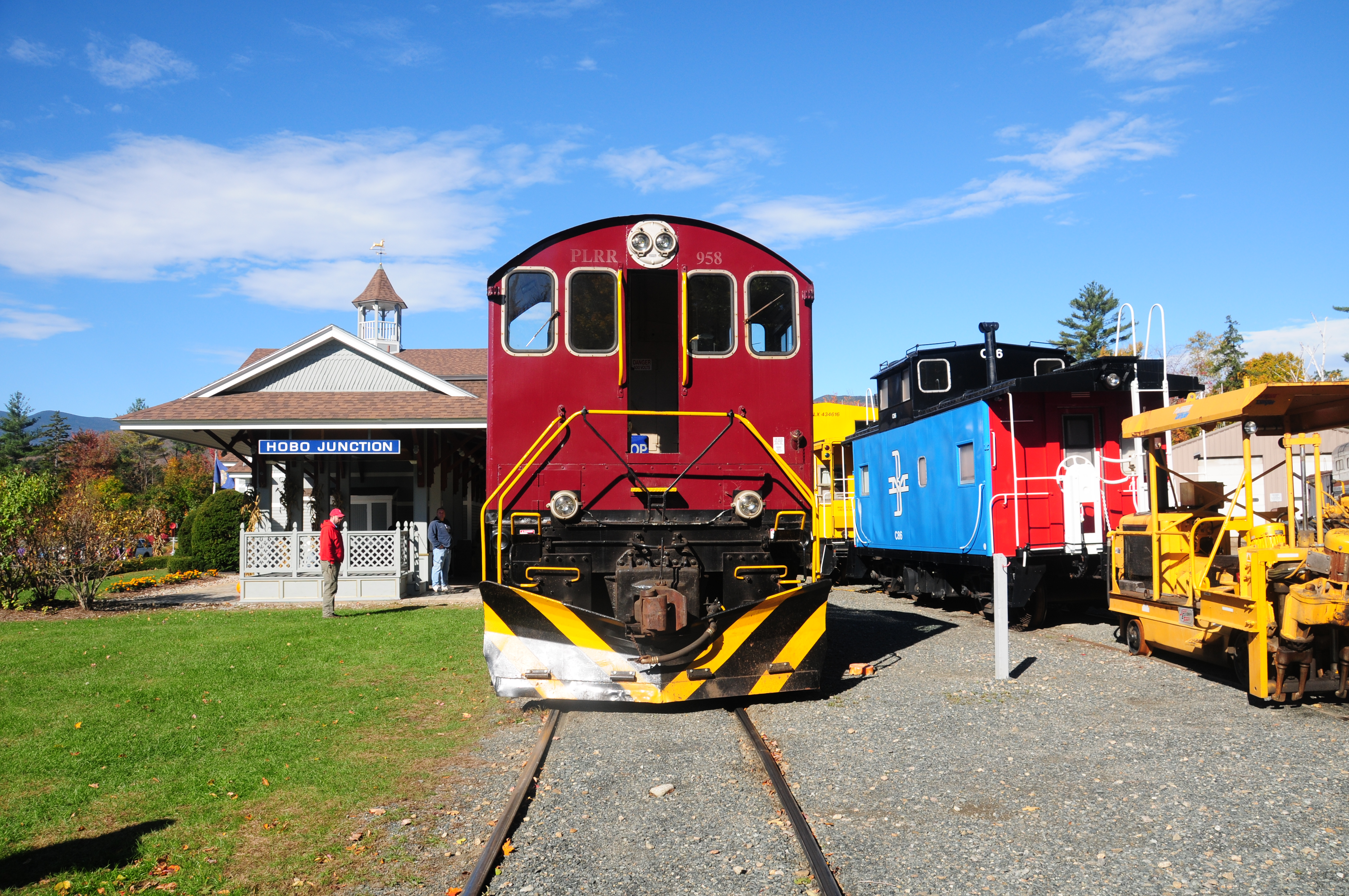
- Hobo Junction with Hobo Railroad scenic trains in Lincoln, New Hampshire

Overview
- Headquarters: Lincoln, New Hampshire
- Reporting mark: PLLX
- Locale: New England
- Dates of operation: 1987–present

Technical
- Track gauge: 4 ft 8 1/2 in (1,435 mm) standard gauge
- Length: 54 mi (87 km)

Other
- Website: www.gsscenic.com

The Plymouth & Lincoln Railroad is a class III shortline railroad operating on the Concord-Lincoln rail line in central New Hampshire, United States. The railroad consists of two distinct passenger operations, the Granite State Scenic Railway, which offers passenger excursion trains in the White Mountains, and the Winnipesaukee Scenic Railroad, which operates passenger excursion trains along the shore of Lake Winnipesaukee in the Lakes Region of New Hampshire. In addition to passenger operations, the railroad owns the Lincoln Shops, a railroad equipment maintenance and repair facility located in Lincoln, New Hampshire.

== History ==
On June 15, 1987, the Plymouth and Lincoln Railroad was formed with the purpose of operating a theme park and railroad out of Lincoln, New Hampshire. Edward Clark and his wife Brenda Reynolds Clark were the owners. Trains have been operating since then between Lincoln and Woodstock, a distance of 7 miles (11 km).

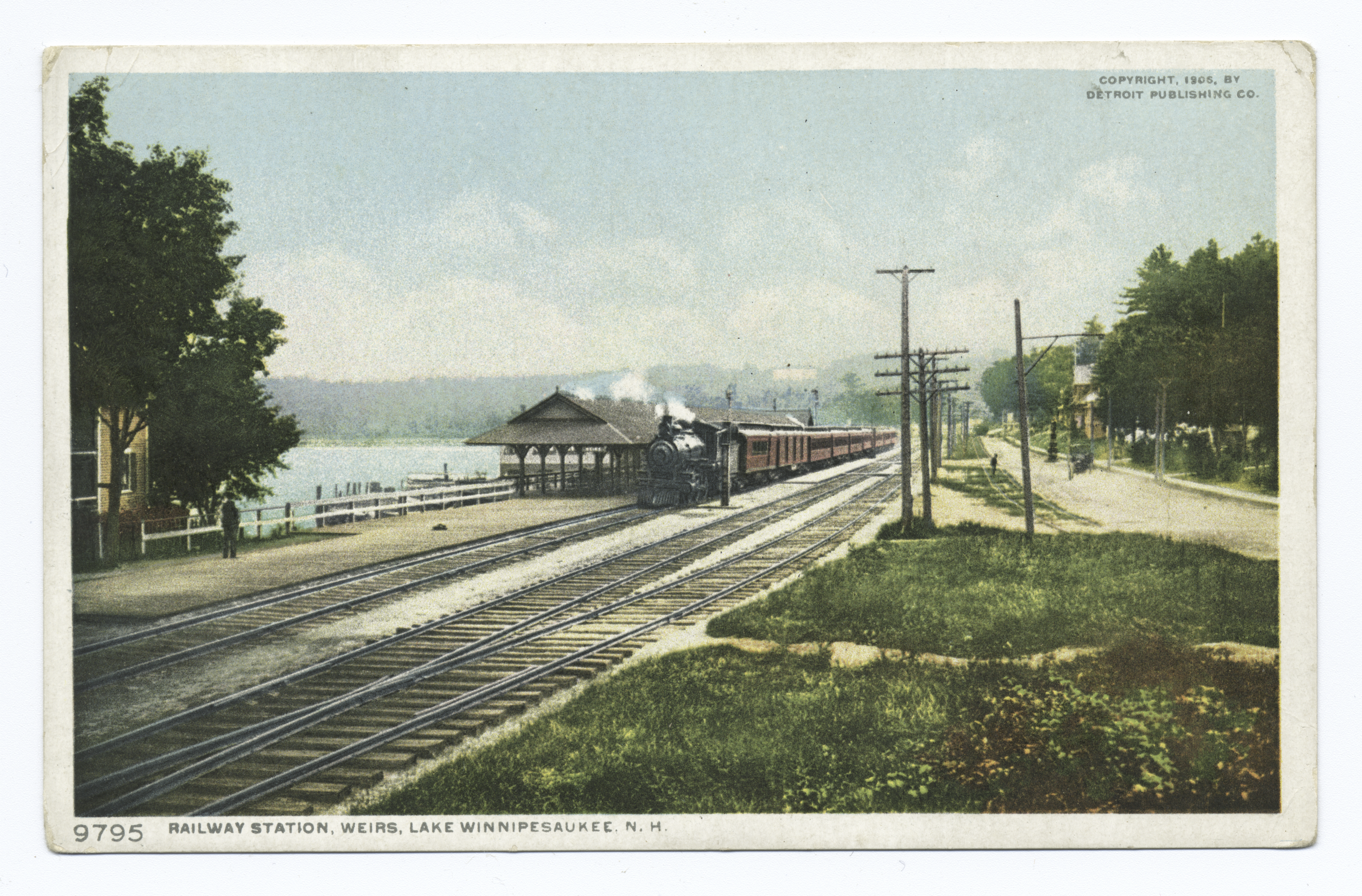
Weirs station, early 20th century

After a few years of operating the railroad in Lincoln under the "Hobo Railroad" name (which would later be renamed "Granite State Scenic Railway"), the railroad was invited to bid on the lease for the state-owned trackage from Tilton to Plymouth. They won the bid, and the Winnipesaukee Scenic Railroad was formed, with trains running from Meredith to Lakeport, with a stop in Weirs Beach.

The railroad now holds the passenger rights on the entire state of New Hampshire-owned track running from Lochmere to Lincoln, a total of 54 miles (87 km). This additional mileage allows the operation of many special excursion trains. The state owns another 19 miles (31 km) of track from Lochmere to Concord, which is used by the New England Southern Railroad for freight customers.

Edward Clark, founder of the railroad, died in the summer of 1998. Benjamin, his only son, assumed the post of President and promoted the business heavily.

The Patriot Rail Company assumed ownership of the two passenger services and the rail bike operations in August 2023.

In April 2024, the railroad was renamed as the Granite State Scenic Railway.

== The Lincoln Shops ==
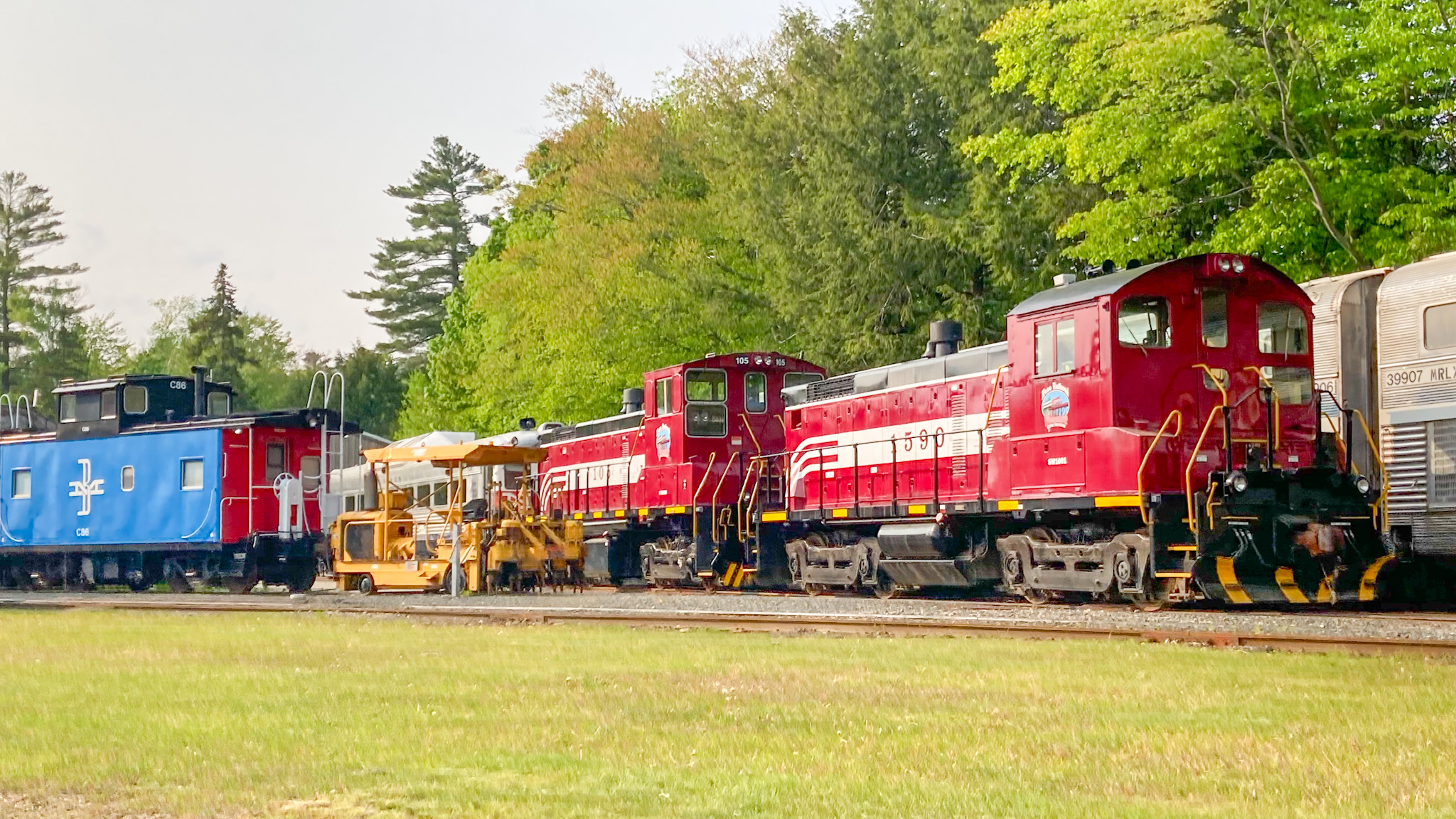
105 and 1590 in 2023 following their repaints

From the mid-1990s, the Lincoln Shops have grown to be a major source of off-season revenue through its refurbishing and repair of numerous pieces of customer railroad equipment. Two Russell snowplows and some subway tampers were rebuilt for the MBTA. The privately owned ex-New Haven Railroad Roger Williams was in for major restoration to like-new condition, along with four or five caboose repaintings. The company's reputation increased the demand for the facility enough to make the business a 12-month operation. In 2005, they brought the three-car set of the Flying Yankee, under restoration, to the Lincoln Shops for completion. In 2021, 2 major locomotive repaints to SW1000 105 and SW1001 1590 were done as well as an interior upgrade on both locomotives.

== Current activities ==
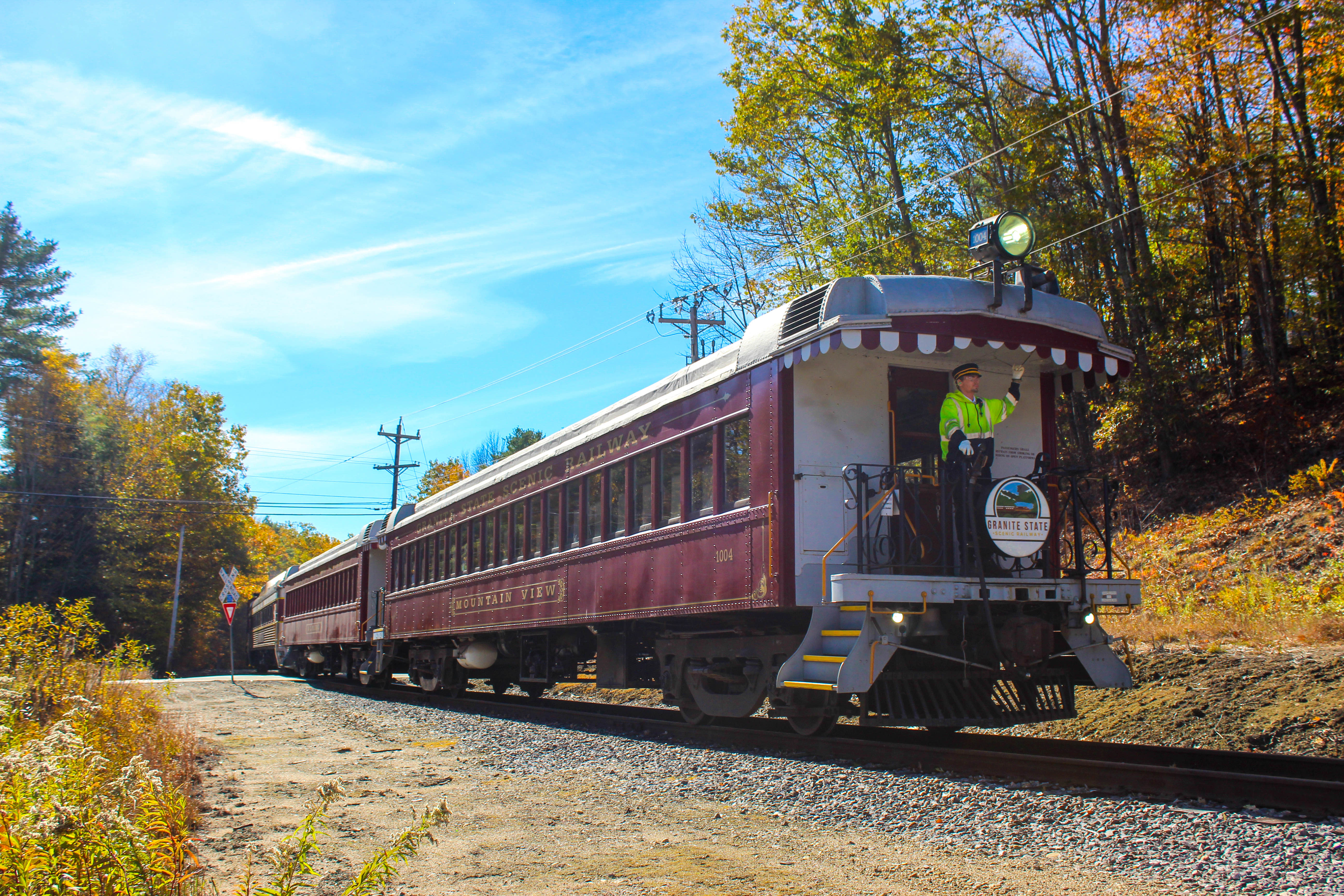
Car 1004 "Mountain View" leads a shove move back to the station.

The railroad operates fall foliage trains in New England, offering routes alongside Lake Winnipesaukee and the Pemigewasset River to the mountains. Since 2003, autumn tourism has formed a major part of the railroad's promotional efforts, supported by its proximity to Boston, located approximately 1.5 hours to the south.

During peak foliage season, the railroad hosts bus tour groups in Meredith, New Hampshire, with up to eight tour buses arriving daily. A notable feature of these seasonal excursions is the "Turkey Train," which offers a full roast turkey meal on board catered by Hart's Turkey Farm Restaurant, a local Meredith establishment.

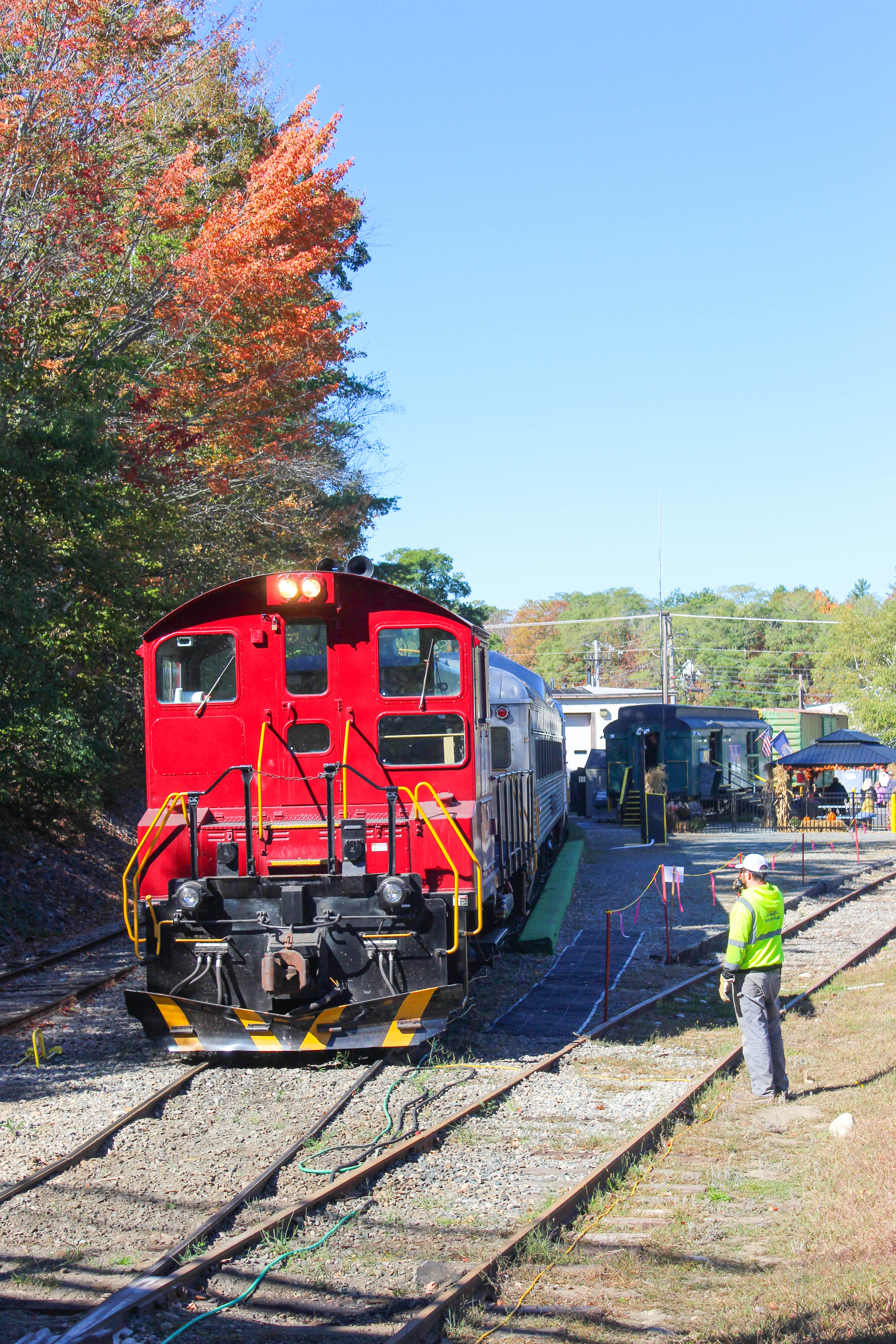
SW1001 1590 at Meredith Station during a fall day in 2025

In winter 2005, the "Believe in Books Literacy Foundation" contracted with the railroad to provide a "Polar Express" out of Lincoln, to supplement the growing demand from the North Conway operation run by the Conway Scenic Railroad. The Tom Hanks movie of the same name was released in the 2004-2005 season, sparking even further interest.

In June 2021, Rail Bike Adventures began offering 2-hour tours out of Laconia Station along the shores of Lake Winnisquam.

Three ALCO S1 switchers (two of them are currently out of service; one switcher is from the Portland Terminal Company and two are from the Maine Central Railroad), an ALCO S3 switcher from the Boston and Maine Railroad, 2 EMD SW1000's, 1 EMD SW1001, 1 EMD GP9, and a former Rock Island Railroad EMD GP7 provide the motive power for the two railroads. Four former Erie Lackawanna Railroad cars and six former Budd RDCs from the MBTA in Boston comprise the railroad cars that they use for operations.

In April 2026, the railroad launched Lincoln Rail Bikes, the successor to the Rail Bike Adventures operation in Laconia. It offers both two hour excursions, and 80-minute excursions on select days. Unlike Laconia, these bikes offer an electric assist feature, allowing guests to pedal as little or as much as they'd like. These rail bike excursions surpassed the train during the year, and subsequently caused what many train fans and locals call the "Last Run on the Hobo RR." This took place on October 11, 2026, where several employees held up a sign signifying this run. As of November 2026, the santa train excursions and the Cafè Lafayette Dinner Train will continue, with just the seasonal excursions being phased out.

Locomotives
Engine #	Picture	Builder & Model	Builder #	Date Built	Notes
105		EMD SW1000	37392	August 1971	
302		EMD GP7	11690	August 1950	Chopped Nose on arrival to Hobo RR
958		ALCO S1	77108	October 1949	
959		ALCO S1	77109	October 1949	Out Of Service; Owned by State of NH
1008		ALCO S1	77112	November 1949	Out Of Service; Owned by State of NH
1012		EMD SW1000	35885	December 1970	
1186		ALCO S3	80052	June 1952	
1590		EMD SW1001	73623-18	November 1973	
1921		EMD GP9	22379	August 1957	

== See also ==
- List of heritage railroads in the United States
