= Bear Island (Lake Winnipesaukee) =

Island in New Hampshire, United States

Coordinates: 43°38′19″N 71°24′0″W

Bear Island is the second largest of the 264 islands in Lake Winnipesaukee in New Hampshire, United States. In the summer it is accessible only by boat because it is not connected to the mainland via a bridge. In the winter it can be reached by crossing the frozen lake, including by snowmobile. According to the Lake Winnipesaukee Historical Society, the island got its name when a few hunters along with a few members of the Pennacook tribe were sent to survey the island. However, they encountered a few bears, which they decided to hunt. Originally the island was named "Big Bear Island", which was later shortened to "Bear Island" when the island was annexed by the town of Meredith in 1799.

== Topography ==
Bear island is located east of Meredith Neck in Lake Winnipesaukee. Its nearest point to the mainland is about 1,200 feet (370 m) off the southern end of Meredith Neck, while most of the island is 0.5 to 1.0 mile (0.8 to 1.6 km) out into the lake. The island is 3 miles (5 km) in length with about 8.5 miles (13.7 km) of shoreline. The island is divided roughly into two land regions by The Carry, a narrow section in the middle of the island, legendarily named for the practice of carrying one's canoe to reach the other side of the island. Each of the two halves of the island rises approximately 150 feet (46 m) above the surface of the surrounding lake. The island is approximately 780 acres. The whole island is generally forested. The shoreline is lined with seasonal cottages, with the exceptions of the summer camps described below. The majority of the interior land is placed into conservation. Walking trails abound. As the rocky soil was once farmed, a number of stone walls cross the island.

== Residences ==
Bear Islands contains around 200 residences along the shorelines.

== St. John's ==
A non-denominational church was established in 1927, built around a then 25-year-old observation tower. Services are summer Sundays at 10:00.

== Summer camps ==
The island houses two YMCA summer camps, one for boys and one for girls. The boys' camp is called Camp Lawrence, and its sister camp is called Camp Nokomis. Both are sponsored by the Bear Island Camps Association under the direction of the Merrimack Valley YMCA.
