= Lake Waukewan =

Lake in Belknap County, New Hampshire

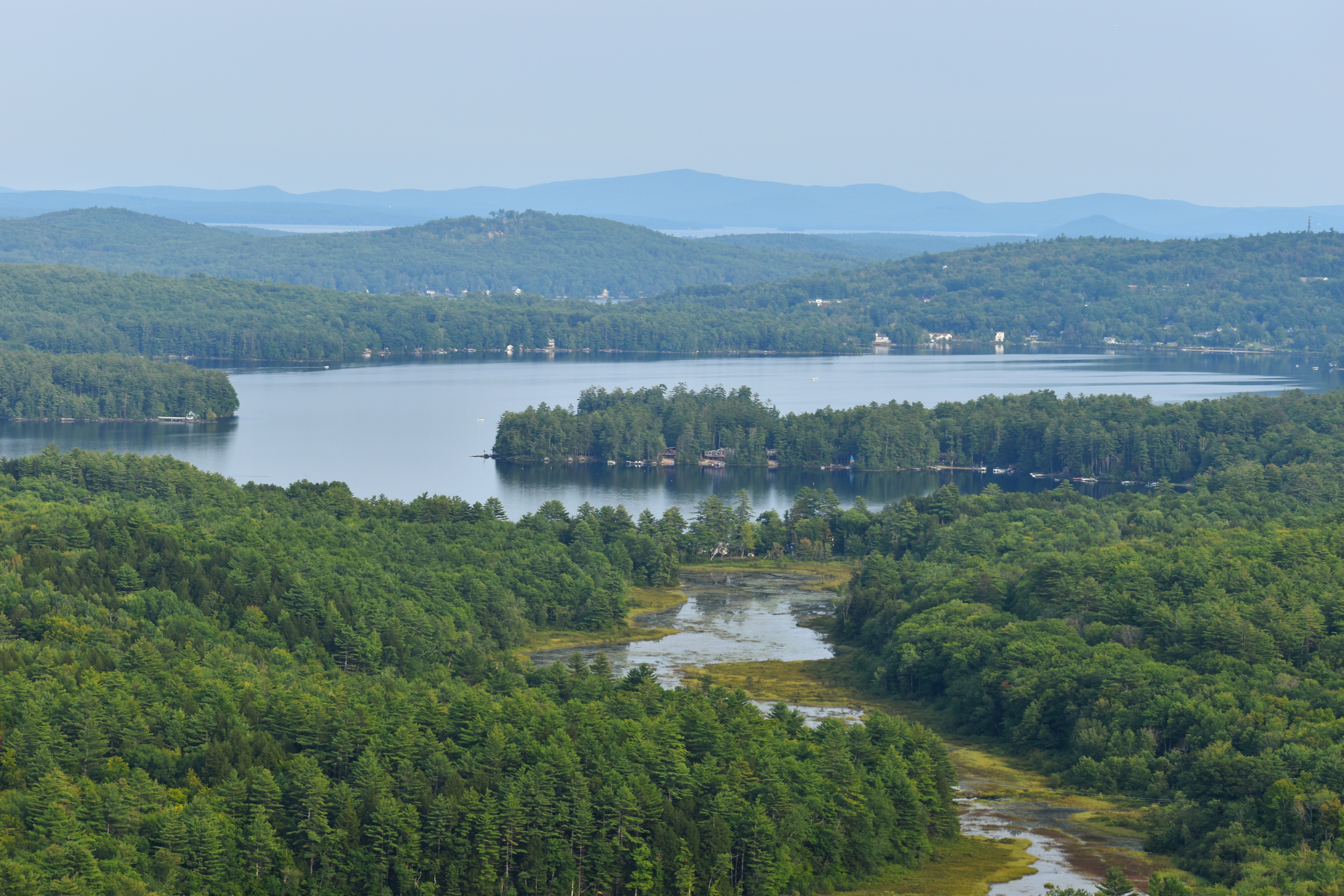

- Location within New Hampshire Location within the United States
- Location: Belknap County, New Hampshire
- Coordinates: 43°39′31″N 71°31′25″W
- Primary inflows: Winona Lake
- Primary outflows: Lake Winnipesaukee
- Basin countries: United States
- Max. length: 2.6 mi (4.2 km)
- Max. width: 1.0 mi (1.6 km)
- Surface area: 928 acres (3.76 km^{2})
- Surface elevation: 540 ft (160 m)
- Islands: Chapman Island
- Settlements: Meredith; Center Harbor; New Hampton

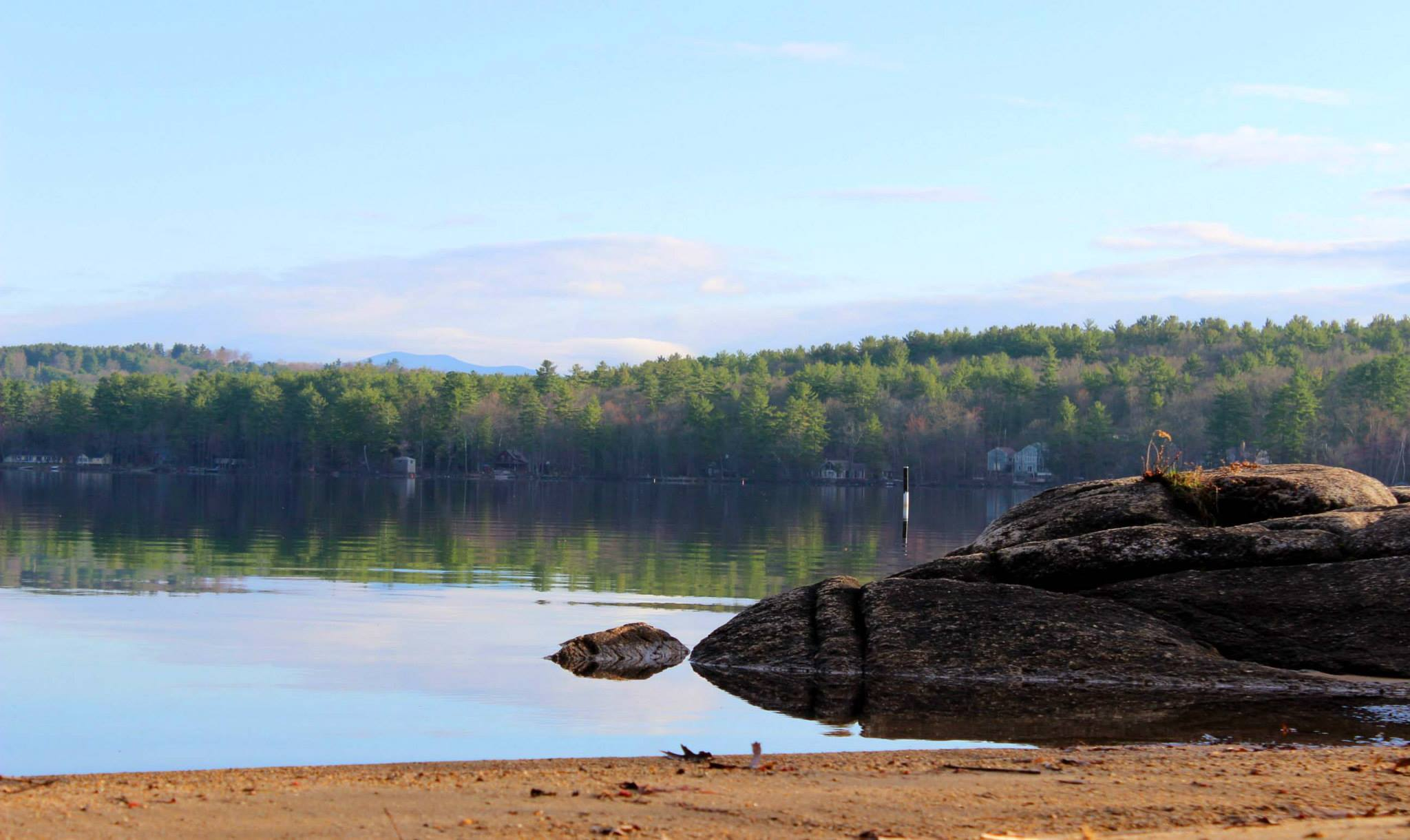
Lake Waukewan in May

Lake Waukewan is a 928-acre (3.76 km^{2}) water body located in Belknap County in the Lakes Region of central New Hampshire, United States, in the towns of Meredith and New Hampton. The town of Center Harbor occupies part of the lake's northern shoreline.

The lake is classified as a cold- and warmwater fishery, with observed species including rainbow trout, smallmouth bass, chain pickerel, horned pout, and white perch. It supplies drinking water for the town of Meredith from an inlet near the south end of the lake.

The water level is controlled by the Dam Bureau of the New Hampshire Department of Environmental Services. As of 2013, it is maintained at 540.0 feet (164.6 m) above sea level in the summer, and 538.5 feet (164.1 m) the rest of the year.

Water from Lake Waukewan flows into Lake Winnipesaukee, with a 40-foot (12 m) drop in elevation. The water rights to the natural Measly Pond Brook (a.k.a. Corliss Brook) was purchased by John Jenness in 1795, and used to power a gristmill and sawmill in Meredith Village, though it was not the best local waterpower source. John Bond Swasey redirected the flow into a 600-foot canal and consolidated waterfall (construction 1816-1818) which greatly improved the amount of waterpower available, allowing further industrialization of the village. (See Meredith, New Hampshire § History.)

== See also ==
- List of lakes in New Hampshire
