= Lake Wicwas =

Lake in the U.S. state of New Hampshire

- Wickwas Lake
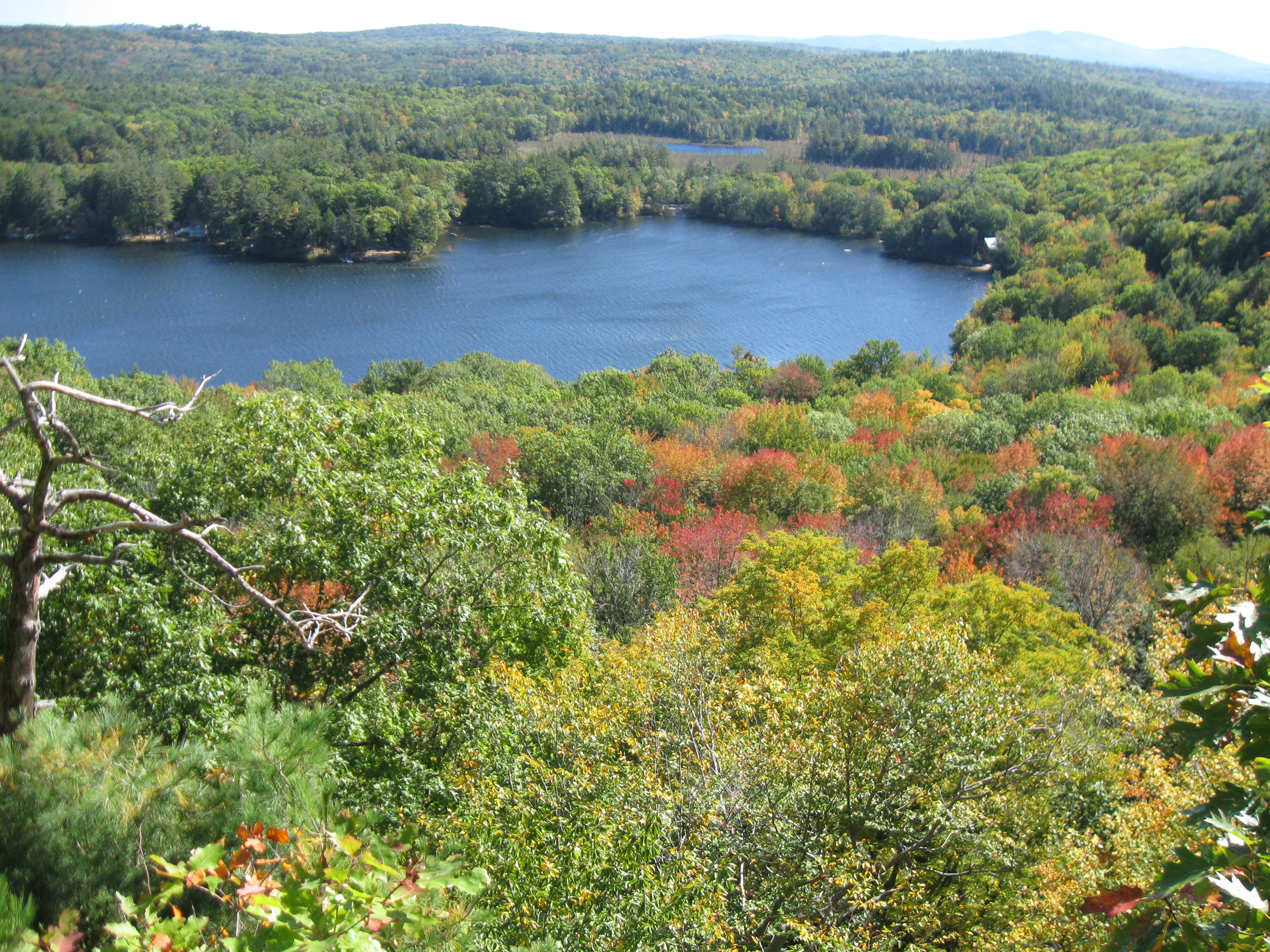

- Location in New Hampshire Location in the United States
- Location: Belknap County, New Hampshire
- Coordinates: 43°36′51″N 71°33′9″W
- Primary inflows: Dolloff Brook
- Primary outflows: tributary of Lake Winnisquam
- Basin countries: United States
- Max. length: 1.7 mi (2.7 km)
- Max. width: 1.1 mi (1.8 km)
- Surface area: 350 acres (1.4 km^{2})
- Average depth: 13 ft (4.0 m)
- Max. depth: 35 ft (11 m)
- Surface elevation: 504 ft (154 m)
- Islands: 4
- Settlements: Meredith

Lake Wicwas, also known as Wickwas Lake, is a 350-acre (1.4 km^{2}) water body in the Lakes Region of central New Hampshire, United States, in the town of Meredith. Water from Lake Wicwas flows south to Lake Winnisquam, then to the Winnipesaukee River, and ultimately to the Merrimack River.

The lake is classified as a warm-water fishery, with observed species including smallmouth and largemouth bass, chain pickerel, horned pout, and black crappie.

Longstanding disagreement about how to spell the name of the lake led locals in 2019 to request that the state officially designate it as "Wicwas" without a K. The requested spelling was adopted by the U.S. Board on Geographic Names in November 2019.

== See also ==
- List of lakes in New Hampshire
