= Winnipesaukee Playhouse =

Theater in Meredith, New Hampshire, United States

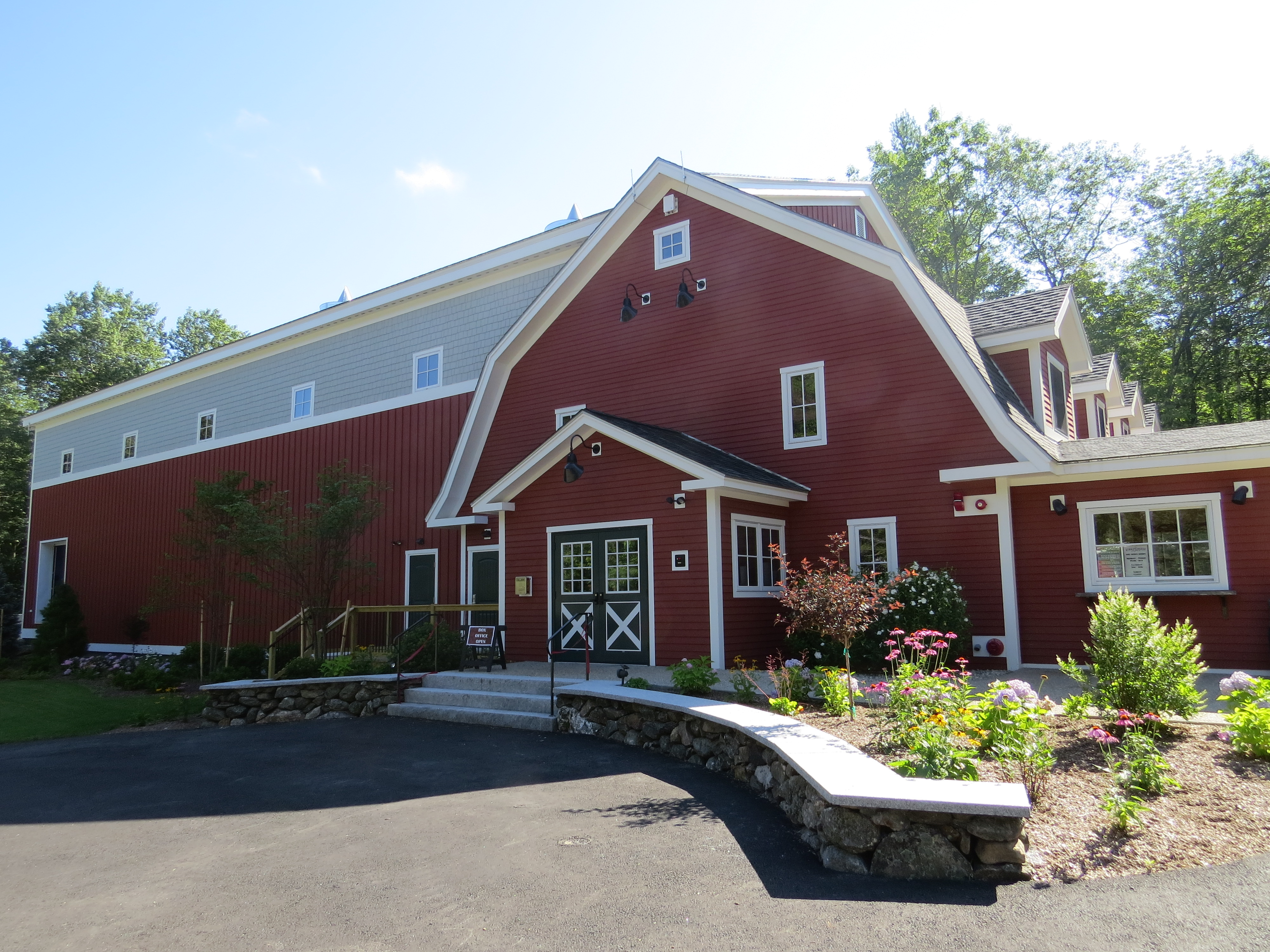
- New 200+ seat theatre
- Interactive map of Winnipesaukee Playhouse
- Address: 33 Footlight Circle (formerly 50 Reservoir Road); Meredith, New Hampshire; United States
- Coordinates: 43.6372°N 71.5083°W
- Capacity: 200–250
- Type: Regional theater

Construction
- Opened: 2004; Relocated 2013

Website
- www.winnipesaukeeplayhouse.org

The Winnipesaukee Playhouse is a 200+ seat courtyard-style theater in Meredith, New Hampshire, United States, in the heart of New Hampshire's Lakes Region. The Playhouse produces both a professional summer stock season and a community theater season, and is arguably the only theater in the United States to do so. Between 2006 and 2019 the Winnipesaukee Playhouse received 87 New Hampshire Theater Awards, more than any other theater in the state during this time period, and in 2009 it was selected by New Hampshire Magazine as the best professional theater in New Hampshire. In 2013 the Playhouse moved from Weirs Beach in Laconia to the former Annalee Dolls campus in Meredith. The new theater has 200 seats as well as support spaces such as offices, dressing rooms, and a lobby, which the previous theater did not have.

== History ==
The Winnipesaukee Playhouse was founded in 2004 by brother and sister Bryan Halperin and Lesley Pankhurst and their spouses, Johanna and Neil. They opened the Playhouse in the Alpenrose Plaza (the former Dexter Shoes outlet plaza) in the village of Weirs Beach in the city of Laconia, New Hampshire. The theater started with a professional summer stock season, and continued with community theater and children's theater during the rest of the year. In 2006 it became a non-profit organization.

In 2008, Hidden Green LLC, investors in the Winnipesaukee Playhouse, purchased the Annalee Dolls factory site for $1.05 million. The Playhouse renovated this property to create a "Tanglewood type of setting" to perform theater and other endeavors in. The theater moved from its previous site in Weirs Beach to the site of Annalee's former gift shop in 2013.

As of 2012, the Winnipesaukee Playhouse had performed 91 plays, 45 of which were professional summer stock, with the rest being community theater or children's theater.

== New theater ==
The access to the Annalee Dolls campus allowed the Winnipesaukee Playhouse to greatly expand and create the first performing arts complex in the Lakes Region of New Hampshire. The campus contains over 14 acres (5.7 ha) of land dotted with seven buildings containing 34,000 square feet (3,200 m^{2}) of space. The new campus offers a state-of-the-art theatre that can seat about 200 patrons, a summer theatre camp for students entering grades K–8, an outdoor amphitheater with performances available before select shows, and a brand-new menu. The entire project to create a performing arts campus cost roughly $4 million. The new theater, with almost 200 seats, more than doubles the audience space that the previous theatre held (84 seats).

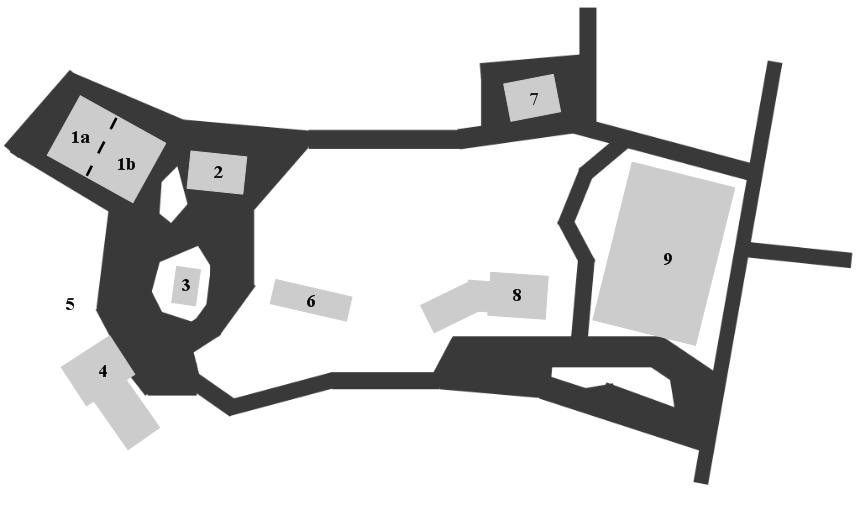
A map of the former Annalee Dolls campus. The following is what each building is currently used for by the theater: 1a- Paint shop 1b- Rehearsal space (Future Black Box Theater) 2- Storage 3- Summer camp space 4- Main Theater 5- Amphitheater 6- Covered Bridge 7- Scene shop 8- Company housing 9- Former Annalee Dolls corporate offices and Outlet Store, (demolished 2013, possibly to make way for future education building)
