= Annalee Dolls =

American Toy Company

Annalee Dolls, Inc.
- Type: Private
- Industry: Doll making
- Founded: Meredith, New Hampshire, U.S. (1955; 71 years ago)
- Founder: Annalee Thorndike
- Headquarters: Meredith, New Hampshire, U.S.
- Area served: Worldwide
- Key people: Annalee Thorndike; Chip Thorndike; Townsend Thorndike; Charles Thorndike
- Revenue: US$10 million
- Number of employees: 30 (2021)
- Website: www.Annalee.com

Annalee Dolls, Inc., also known as Annalee Mobilitee Dolls Inc., and AMD Holdings Inc., is a company located in Meredith, New Hampshire, that manufactures collectible dolls. The company was founded by Barbara Annalee Davis (later Thorndike), who died in 2002. The state of New Hampshire hired Davis to create dolls to help promote tourism to the state and, in the 1950s, the dolls started to appear in store windows of department stores in Manchester and Boston. At the company's height, it filled over 14 acres (5.7 ha) of land, dotted with seven buildings containing 34,000 square feet (3,200 m^{2}) of space, and had US$15 million in sales with 300 employees. The popularity of Annalee Dolls led R. Stuart Wallace to write that "the most famous manufactured item to come from New Hampshire in the 20th century is the Annalee doll." Annalee Dolls have reached up to $6,000 at auction. In 2008, the company closed its museum and sold its Meredith factory while as of 2006, there were only 30 employees.

== History ==
Barbara Annalee Davis was born in Concord, New Hampshire, in 1915, and grew up at 113 Centre Street in the same city. Originally interested in puppetry as a young girl, she began creating dolls at a young age along with a friend. When her friend went off to college in the early 1930s, Annalee, as she was called, continued to create dolls and began to sell them through the League of New Hampshire Craftsmen. She soon moved to Boston and continued to sell her dolls, most notably to S.S. Pierce and Co.

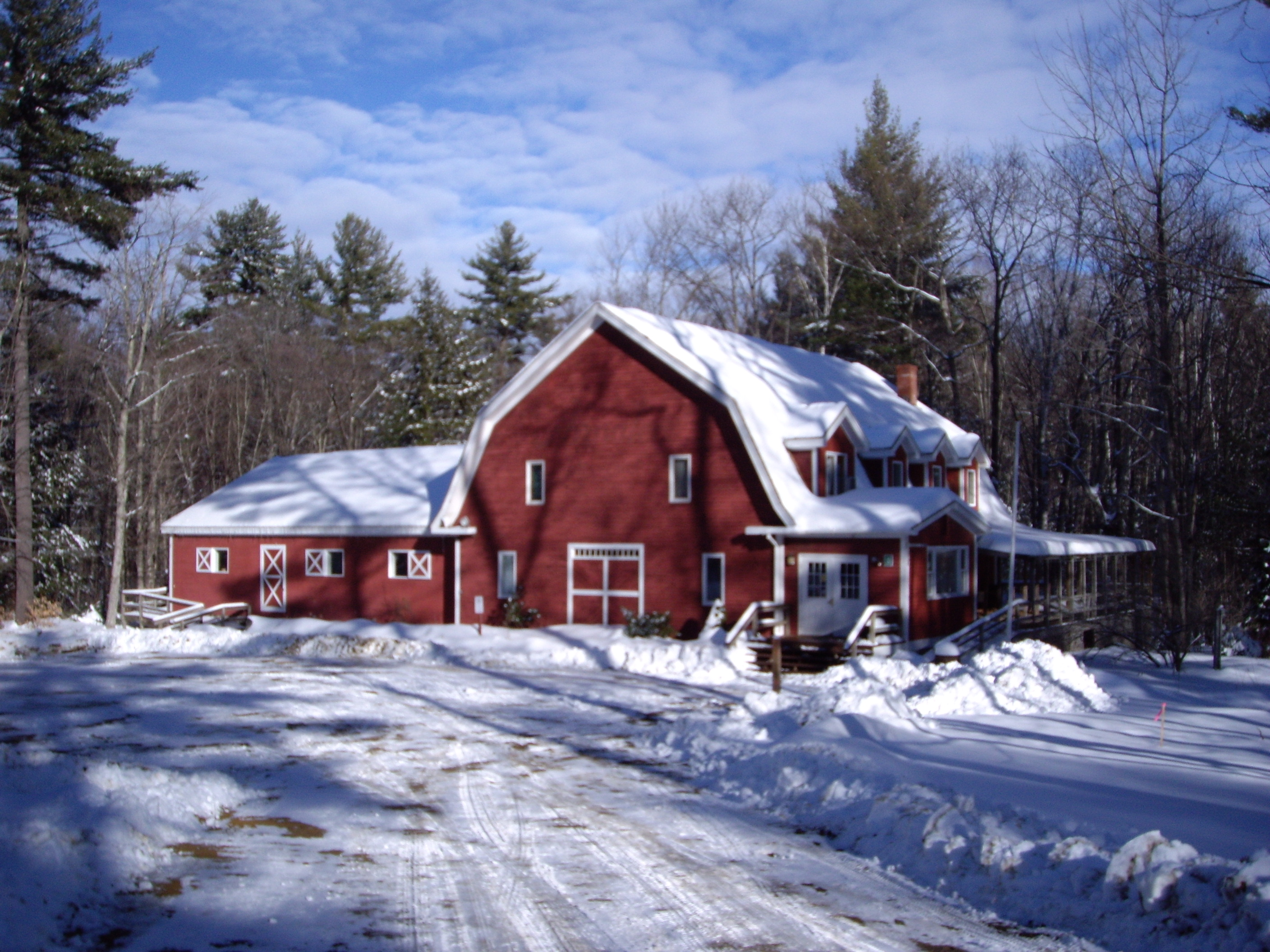
Former Annalee Dolls Gift Shop in Meredith, New Hampshire

In 1941, Annalee met Harvard graduate Charles "Chip" Thorndike. Soon thereafter, the two married and moved to Meredith, New Hampshire, where they raised a family and opened Thorndike's Eggs and Auto Parts, which survived until 1950. With the fall in price of eggs and poultry, Annalee wanted to see if she could make money selling her dolls again. The Thorndikes sold off a section of the poultry farm and used the profits to create a small line of skier dolls. The line was a success, and slowly the Annalee doll "Factory in the Woods" was born. This continued until, in 1955, Annalee Mobilitee Dolls was incorporated as a company.

During the 1950s, stores in Manchester and Boston started buying Annalee dolls to decorate store windows, and Annalee was hired by New Hampshire to create dolls to be featured in tourism material. These dolls were on display at the Eastern States Exposition in Springfield, Massachusetts, and at the Rockefeller Center in New York City, both to advertise the state. These promotional dolls were extremely popular; so popular in fact that by 1960 Annalee dolls were being sold in stores in forty states, Canada, and Puerto Rico.

In 1964, the day-to-day operation of doll making became too big for the Thorndikes' house. At this time they moved the operations out of the house and into a "factory in the woods". Over time, the factory expanded to eventually fill over fourteen acres of land dotted with seven buildings containing 34,000 square feet (3,200 m^{2}) of space.

Annalee Dolls came into the spotlight again when, in 1975, a New Hampshire state legislator gave then-president Gerald Ford a selection of dolls to decorate the White House Christmas tree. In 1990, Annalee Dolls became the headgear sponsor for Christopher Pederson, a member of the United States Ski Team. The Annalee logo was placed on all of his headgear (helmets, hats, etc.), and in exchange the company sold a special "Victory Ski Doll" of which five percent of the sales went to the ski team.

In 1992, Annalee and Chip gave each of their sons, Townsend and Charles, 48 percent of the doll making company, and in 1995, Charles took control of the everyday operations of Annalee dolls.

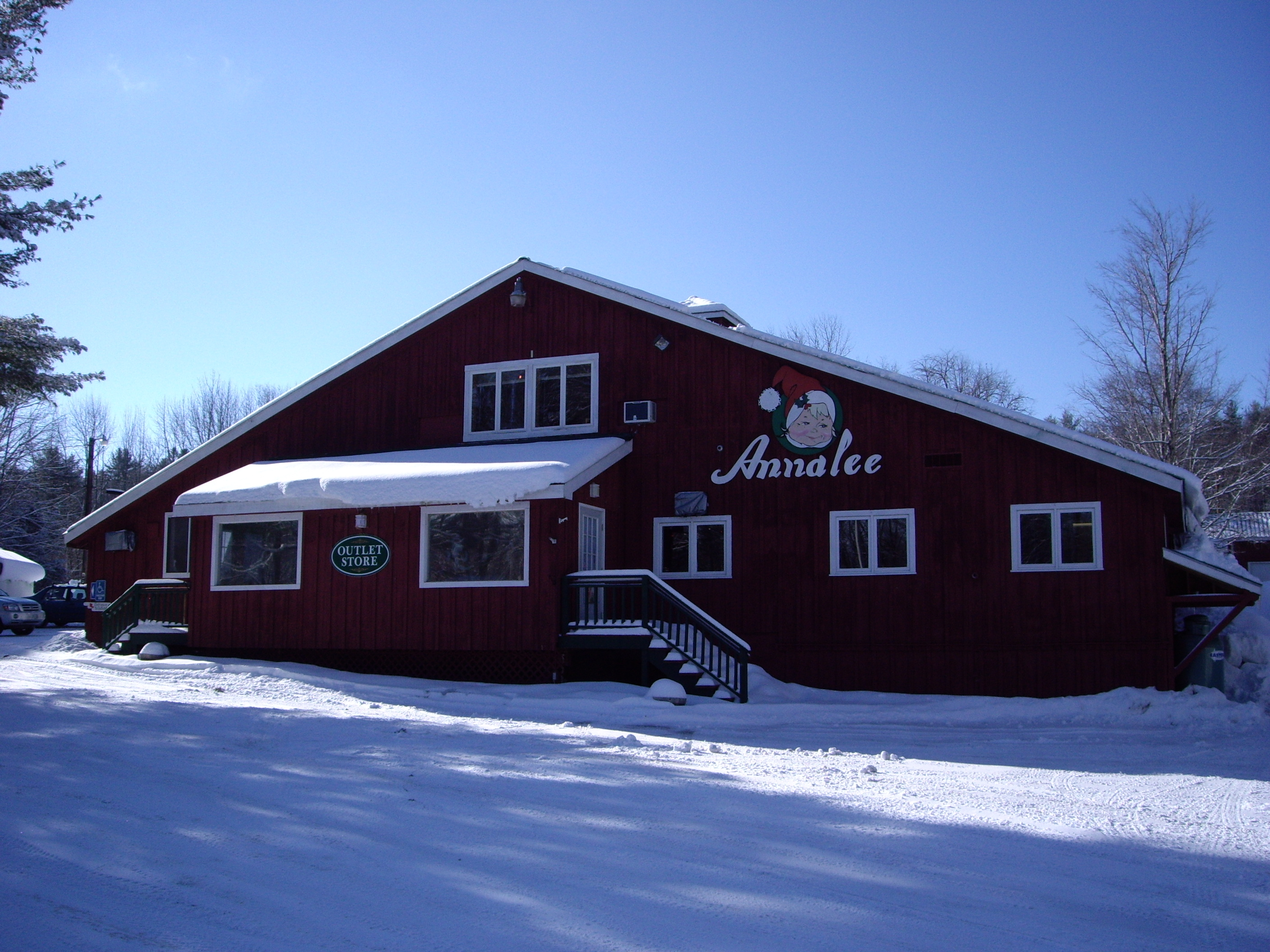
Annalee corporate offices and outlet store in Meredith, New Hampshire

During the later part of the 1990s, the market for collectibles began to fall, and many companies began to outsource their operations. Annalee was one of these companies. In 2001, all construction of dolls and other collectibles was outsourced overseas, while the design and marketing departments stayed in Meredith. A short time after this switch in business model, on April 7, 2002, Annalee Thorndike died.

In 2008, after a string of lawsuits between the two sons of Annalee Thorndike over ownership of the company, including a case heard by the New Hampshire Supreme Court, Annalee Dolls was acquired by David Pelletier, Bob Watson, and the Imagine Company of Hong Kong, the company which builds the dolls. That same year, the company decided to sell their "Factory in the Woods". The Winnipesaukee Playhouse, a small 84-seat theater located in the Weirs Beach section of Laconia, purchased the Annalee Doll Factory site for 1.05 million dollars. The Playhouse plans to renovate the property to create a "Tanglewood type of setting" for their theatrical endeavors. The plans are to move the theater from its current site in Weirs Beach to the site of Annalee's former gift shop. Annalee operates out of its corporate headquarters, a former chicken farm building on site. That same year, Annalee auctioned off a selection of dolls from their museum.

Annalee Dolls planned on moving its outlet store and offices to the site of a former grocery store located in the Old Province Common, on Route 104 in Meredith, and vacate the "Factory in the Woods" for good. The company hoped to "be in its new location and open by mid-July with the full move-in anticipated in September or October." Annalee Dolls' creative director stated that "With all the construction going on around us for the Winni Playhouse, it was just time for us to make the jump to a new location." David Pelletier, chief executive officer of Annalee Dolls, claims that “We can be wherever we want to be,” but since Annalee dolls has been associated with New Hampshire and especially Meredith since its beginnings, there "was value in terms of continuity of identity in remaining in Meredith." The storefront Annalee Dolls is moving to contains 30,000 square feet (2,800 m^{2}), 2,500 square feet (230 m^{2}) of which will be a retail store, with the rest being offices and warehouse space.

Annalee Dolls moved to 339 Daniel Webster Highway in 2016.

== Dolls ==
Annalee dolls are bendable felt-bodied dolls, with a painted face that is similar to the face of Annalee Thorndike. The dolls can range in height from a few inches to 6 feet (1.8 m) tall. The taller dolls were usually used as store displays, while the smaller ones were sold directly to consumers. Dolls can range in theme from elves, to one of many different types of animals, to clowns. Originally, the wire frame inside the doll was crafted by Chip Thorndike, while the rest of the doll was sewn and painted by Annalee herself. Chip also would create small wooden props (such as skis, ski poles, boats, etc.) for the dolls to hold or appear to be using in some way. Starting in 1986 the label sewn onto each Annalee Doll included the year the doll was made.

As the company grew Annalee and Chip could not deal with the volume and hired workers to help create the dolls, but in 2001, after a switch in business model, the construction of dolls and other collectibles moved from New Hampshire to overseas.

Since Annalee's death, the dolls have been designed by designers who take "inspiration from Annalee’s earlier dolls to evoke memories and sustain tradition." These designers work in Meredith at Annalee Doll headquarters which also contains sales and marketing departments as well as an outlet store. After design work is complete, the dolls are built by the Imagine Company of Hong Kong then shipped back to New Hampshire for distribution. When asked about the moving of operations overseas, David Pelletier, chief executive officer of Annalee Dolls, responded, “We’ve always had home workers and the only difference is now they are 8,000 miles away.”

In 1992, at the annual Annalee Doll Society Auction, a 10 inch tall Halloween girl doll created in the 1950s was auctioned off for a record $6,000. Due to the high price and collectability of Annalee dolls, there have been instances of people creating counterfeit dolls.

== Factory in the Woods ==
The Annalee Doll "Factory in the Woods" was located on Reservoir Road in Meredith. At the company's height, it filled over fourteen acres of land dotted with seven buildings containing 34,000 square feet (3,200 m^{2}) of space. In addition to being the location where the dolls were made, it was a major Lakes Region tourist destination, including, among other things, shaded picnic and play areas, a display of antique cars, a covered footbridge, the Annalee Doll Museum, and a gift shop.

The Annalee Doll Museum was originally housed in a large building on the "Factory in the Woods" site, whose exterior facade was a reproduction of then Barbara Annalee Davis', later Annalee Thorndike's, childhood homestead.

In 2008 a selection of the Annalee Doll Museum's holdings were auctioned off. At the same time, the museum moved online to a digital form where one can view the dolls in the collection without visiting New Hampshire.
