= Lake steamers of North America =

Lake steamers of North America include large, steam-powered non-government vessels with displacement hulls on American freshwater lakes excluding the Great Lakes. They may have served as passenger boats, freighters, mail-boats, log-boom vessels or a combination thereof. The construction of such vessels posed unique problems on water bodies located away from established dry-docks and marine railways, or connecting canals to such facilities.

In some countries such as Switzerland, lake steamers may have been preserved in their original configuration. In the United States with its dynamic economy and changing cultural mores, the survival of such boats often depended on reuses and power plant changes. The MS Mount Washington, with four different power-plants and changes from side-wheeler to screw steamer to diesel power, provides a fine example. Few such vessels survive in the US where the first commercial steamers were launched.

== Smaller steamers ==
Surviving vessels in near original condition:

- Louise—Steam yacht preserved on Geneva Lake, Wisconsin, available for cruises. Built in 1902 by the Racine Boat Works for Chicago banker John J. Mitchell, it is an elegant vessel now in passenger excursion service. Originally utilizing a coal-fired boiler, it has been extensively upgraded to a more efficient and environment-friendly diesel-fired Scotch marine boiler, powering a two-cylinder double expansion steam engine. This is a steel-hulled vessel, with mahogany trim, and in operation with the Gage Marine Corporation under the auspices of Bill Gage, third-generation owner of the company.
- Minnehaha—1906 "Streetcar" style commuter steamer raised from the bottom of Lake Minnetonka, Minnesota. Wood hull. Available for cruises.
- Virginia V—1922 Puget Sound "Mosquito Fleet" steamer based in Lake Union, Seattle. She originally sailed on the salt water of Puget Sound, but today does the majority of her cruising on Lake Union and Lake Washington. Wood hull with 1904 triple-expansion steam engine. Available for cruises.
- Ticonderoga—One of the nation's two surviving walking-beam side-wheel steamer built in 1906 for service on Lake Champlain. Now a stationary museum at the Shelburne Museum in Shelburne, Vermont.

== Dieselized steamer hulls ==
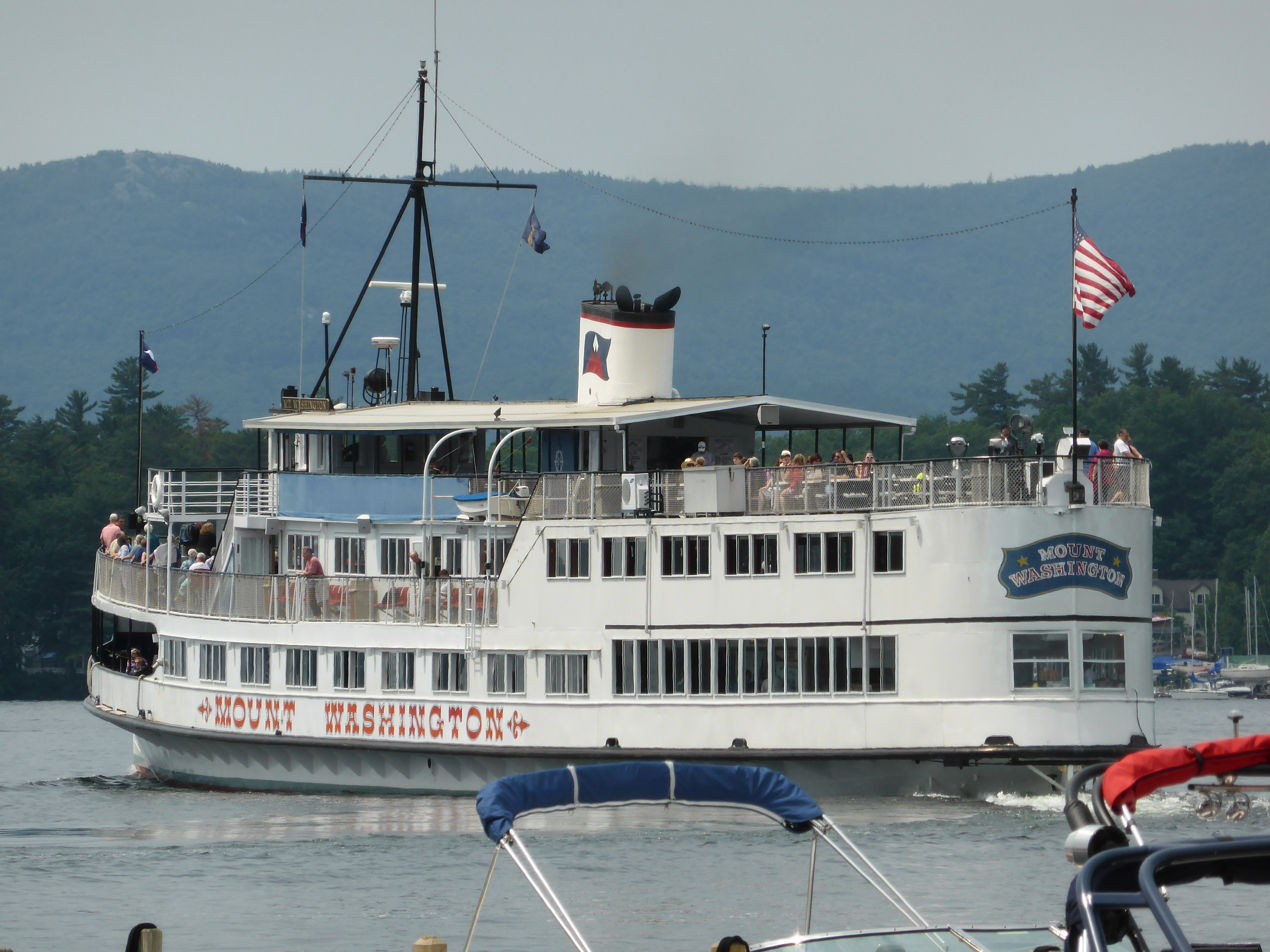
MS Mount Washington

- MV Mount Katahdin—The MV Katahdin of 1914 sails on Moosehead Lake in Maine. The Bath Iron Works-built ship served as a log drive vessel as well as providing summer excursions. It is owned and operated by the Moosehead Maritime Museum. Its outward appearance adheres closely to its lake steamer roots. Available for cruises.
- MV Mohican II—The MV Mohican II of Lake George in New York is on the National Register of Historic Places. It was launched in 1907, replacing an earlier wood steamer with the same name. Available for cruises.
- MS Mount Washington—The MS Mount Washington of Lake Winnipesaukee in New Hampshire replaced an earlier wooden side-wheel steamer that burned in 1939. Parties interested in continuing the tradition of a lake steamer purchased an old sidewheel vessel on Lake Champlain: the Chateaugay, a 203-foot (62 m), iron-hulled sidewheeler that was being used as a clubhouse for the Burlington yacht club. It was cut into sections and transported to Lake Winnipesaukee on rail cars. A new twin-screw vessel was designed for the hull being welded back together at Lakeport, New Hampshire. Powered by two steam engines taken from an ocean-going yacht, the new Mount Washington made her maiden voyage on August 15, 1940. The ship has been renovated multiple times, including several upgrades to the ship power plant, and hull extensions added to lengthen the ship.
