= MS Mount Washington =

Vessel on Lake Winnipesaukee in New Hampshire, USA

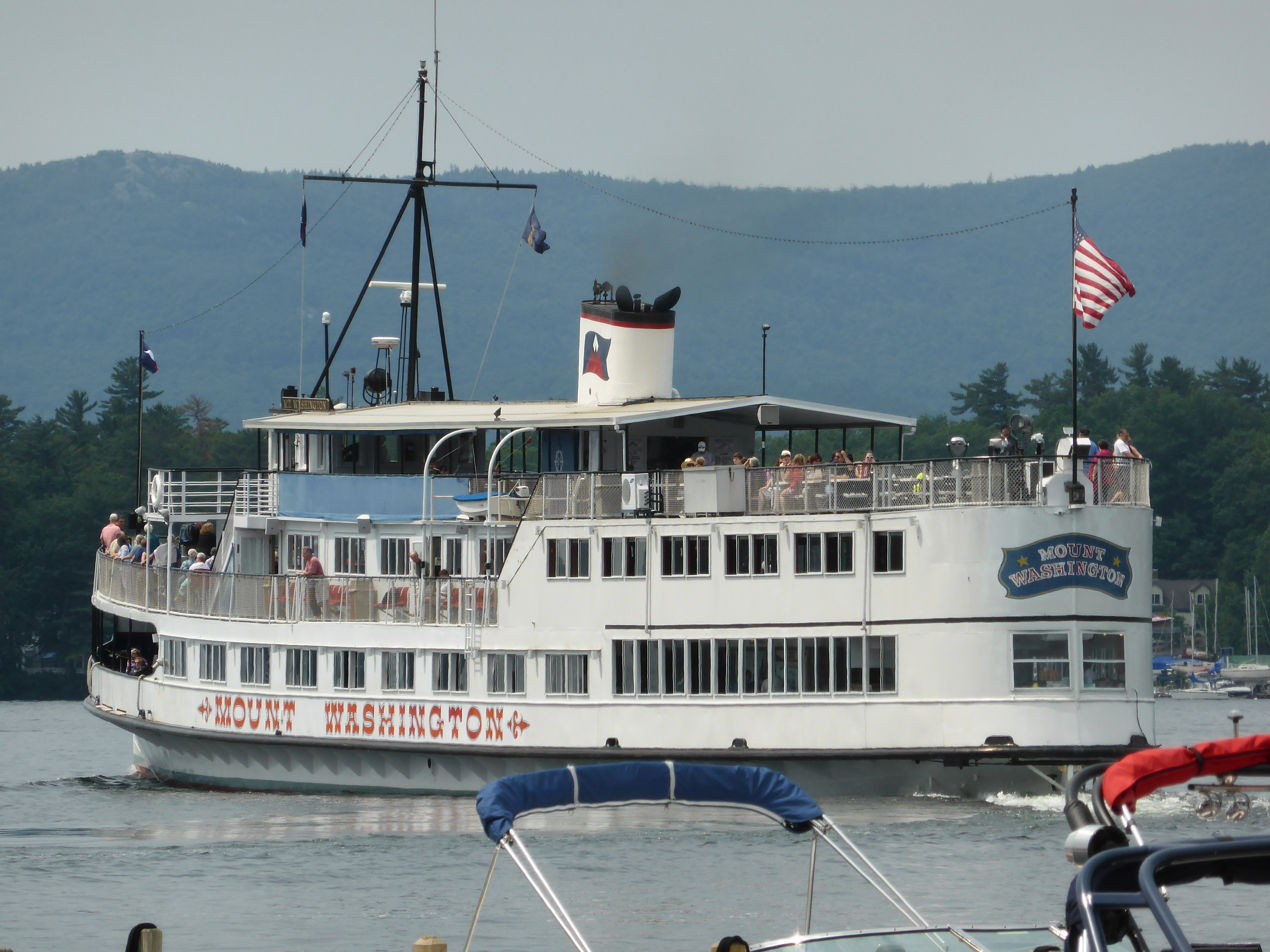
MS Mount Washington at Wolfeboro town dock

The MS Mount Washington is the flagship vessel of the Winnipesaukee Flagship Corporation. Her home port is on Lake Winnipesaukee in Laconia, New Hampshire, in the United States. The historic ship makes several ports of call around the lake during her scenic cruises in the spring, summer and fall months. Ice-Out is declared when the Mount Washington can get to all of her ports of call.

== History ==
=== Paddle steamer Mount Washington (the "Old Mount") ===
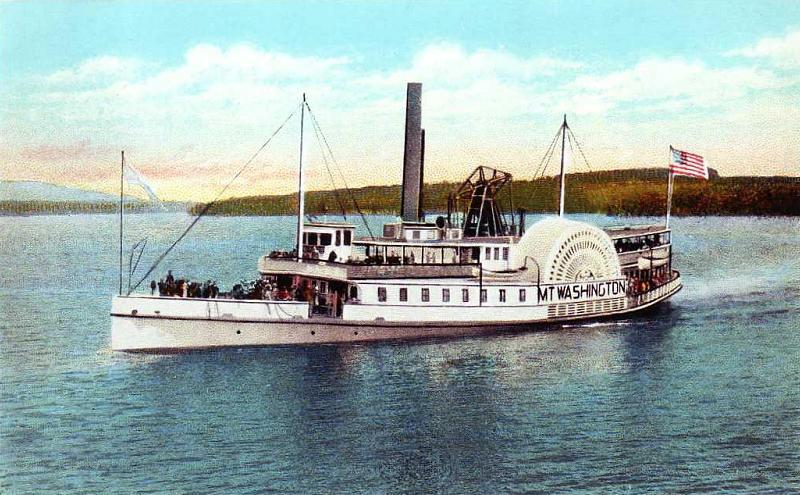
Original Mount Washington c. 1920

The history of the MS Mount Washington dates back to 1872 when the original paddle steamer Mount Washington was launched from Alton Bay. The Mount was the largest of all the steamers on the lake at 187 feet (57 m) in length, with a beam of 49 feet (15 m). She was driven by a single cylinder steam engine of 450 horsepower (340 kW) that operated at approximately 26 RPM. Power was transferred from the vertical cylinder to the paddle wheel shaft by the walking beam, high above the upper deck, oscillating at the frequency of the paddle wheels.

She was built by the Boston and Maine Railroad Company with the intent of transporting cargo and passengers around the lake. By the late 19th century it was not uncommon for her to transport over 60,000 passengers in a single season. In the 1920s, with the rise of the automobile and declining train usage, the Boston and Maine Railroad Co. made the decision to sell the steamer to Captain Leander Lavallee. Captain Lavallee operated the Mount as a tourist attraction, still drawing crowds of over 60,000 a season.

The "Old Mount" graced Winnipesaukee for a total of 67 years before being destroyed on December 23, 1939, by fire. She was tied up at dock when a fire started at a nearby railway station. The fire spread down the dock and engulfed her at her home port. Efforts to cut the Mount loose were to no avail as it was a time of extremely low water and the hull was stuck fast in the mud of the lake bottom.

=== SS, MV and MS Mount Washington ===
Soon after, a local company was formed to build a new ship. Europe was already at war and obtaining steel in the USA was impossible because of pre-war munitions stock-piling. Instead, they purchased an old sidewheel vessel on Lake Champlain: the 1888 Harlan & Hollingsworth-built Chateaugay, a 203-foot (62 m), iron-hulled sidewheeler that was being used as a clubhouse for the Burlington yacht club. It was cut into sections and transported to Lake Winnipesaukee on rail cars. A new twin-screw vessel was designed for the hull being welded back together at Lakeport. Powered by two steam engines taken from another ocean-going yacht, the new Mount Washington made her maiden voyage on August 15, 1940.

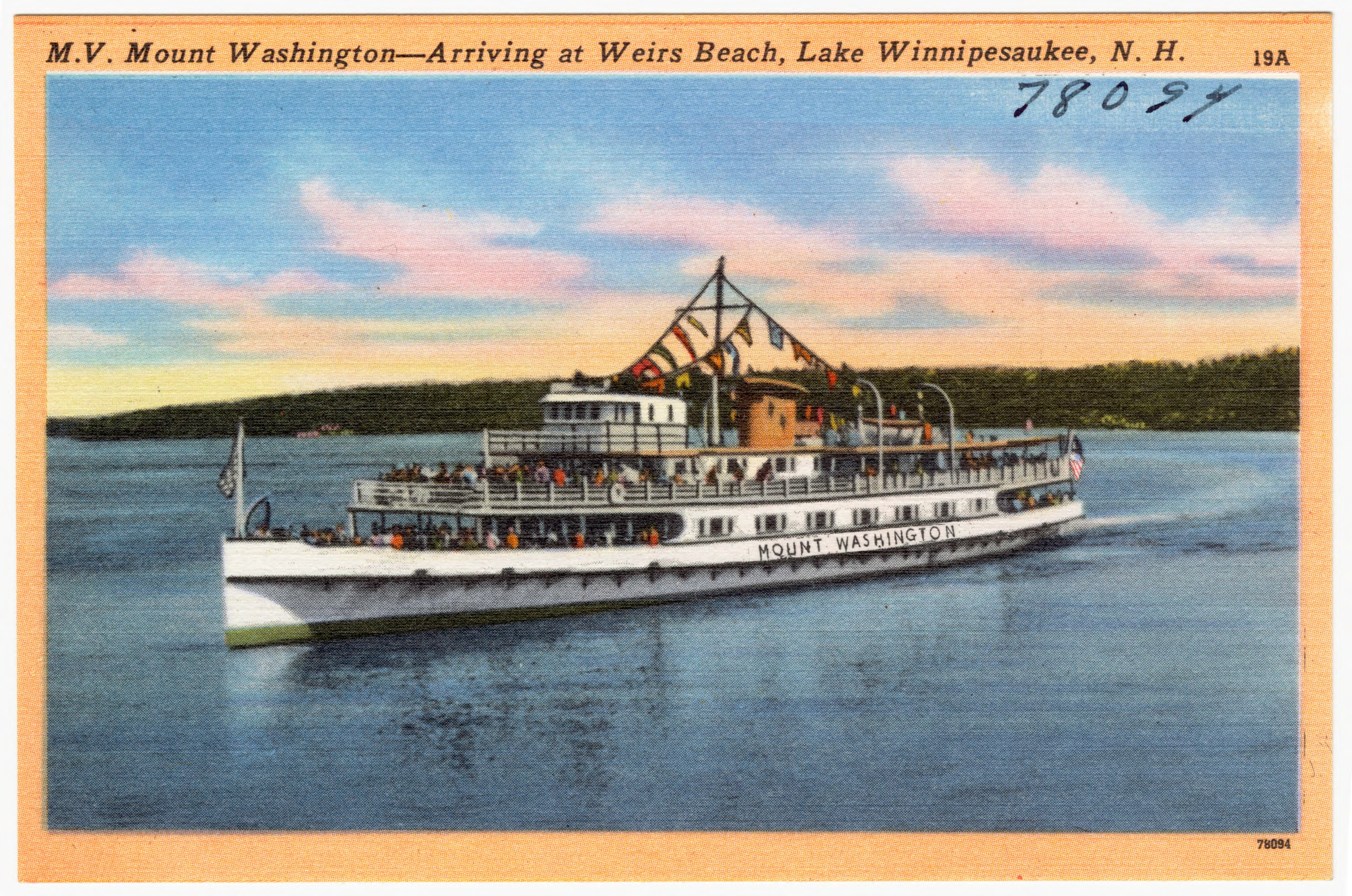
M.V. Mount Washington

Two years after her launch, the new Mount's engines and boilers were removed for use in a navy vessel during World War II. After the war, the Mount Washington returned to the water but with diesel engines, hence the "M/V" prefix designating "motor vessel." The ship was a success in the post-war tourist boom although she became a money-maker in the 1980s under the ownership of Scott Brackett.

In 1982, the Mount was cut open and extended with an additional 20-foot (6.1 m) hull section to add larger lounge and food service facilities. The larger size upped the ship's designation to M/S or "motor ship." More popular, the Mount makes one or two round-trips on the lake per day during the summer season, as well as numerous dinner dance cruises in the evenings.

In March 2010, the Mount was cut open, the unserviceable circa 1946 motors were removed (Enterprise DMG18 motors: 8cyl 615 hp), and the ship was repowered with two 'green' Caterpillar motors, giving more power and economy to the ship.

== Notable crew over the years ==
=== Captains ===
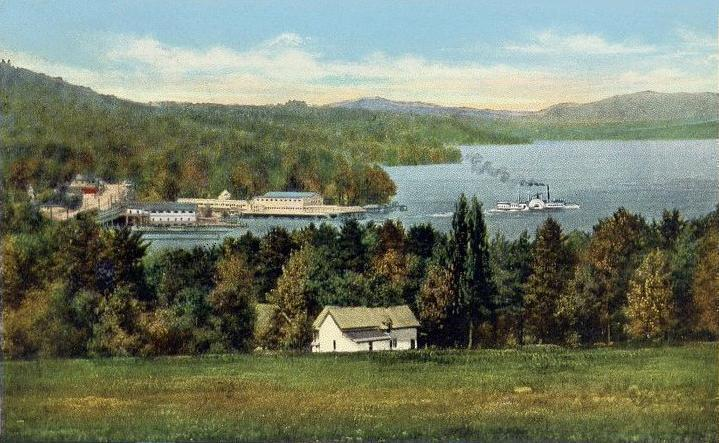
Original Mount Washington leaving The Weirs c. 1920

- Augustus Wiggins was the first captain of the original steamer Mount Washington, in 1872. He was followed by Harry Wentworth.
- Herbert A. Blackstone took command in 1908 and remained in charge until 1921.
- Leander Lavallee was the captain of the steamer Mount Washington from 1921 to 1932 and again from 1935 to 1939. He oversaw the creation of the new SS Mount Washington.
- Captain Bryan Avery (deceased) worked from 1937 to 1984. He was the only captain to have worked on the side-wheeler Mt. Washington and the M/S Mount Washington.
- Captain Robert Murphy (deceased) worked from 1945 to 1988.
- Captain Robert Cole worked from 1969 to 1991.
- Captain Scott Brackett owned the company from 1971 to 1985.
- Captain Roland Johnson (deceased) worked from 1979 to 1990.
- Captain Edward Driscoll (deceased) worked from 1980 to 1993.
- Captain John Pettengill (deceased) worked from 1964 to 2005.
- Captain Harry Welch, Sr. (deceased) worked from 1982 to 2007.
- Captain James Morash started as a deckhand in 1979 and was promoted to captain in 2000.
- Captain Bruce Campbell started as a deckhand in 1969 and retired as captain in 2017.
- Captain Paul Smith joined the Mount crew in 1986. He was a deckhand, deck officer, skipper and pilot before becoming a captain in 1994.
- Captain Leo O'Connell (deceased) started in 1992 as a small boat skipper and retired as Fleet Captain in 2017.
- Captain Robert Duffey started in 2009 and was promoted to captain in 2014.
- Captain Denis Finnerty started in 1991 and was promoted to captain in 2017. He retired in 2020.
- Captain Patricia Quinn became the first woman captain of the M/S Mount Washington in August 2021.
- Captain Kevin Pettengill was promoted to captain in October 2021. He is the son of Captain John Pettengill.
- Captain Robert Amann was promoted to captain in October 2021.
- Captain Michael Lewis was promoted to captain on May 10, 2026. He is only the 25th person in more than 150 years to command the Mount.

=== Crew ===
- Bruce Heald (deceased 05/02/2015) was the most senior crew member of the MV Mount Washington. Dr. Heald was a purser aboard the Mount since 1964. He was the official historian for the Winnipesaukee Flagship Cooperation (WFC) fleet. In his years with WFC he wrote several books on the history of the fleet as well as many others about Lake Winnipesaukee and New Hampshire. In 1994 the purser's office aboard the Mount was dedicated in his name for his 30 years of service and countless contributions to recording the history of the WFC fleet and Lake Winnipesaukee.
- Monty the Mallard is the official cruise mascot.

== Current operation ==
=== Seasonal cruises ===
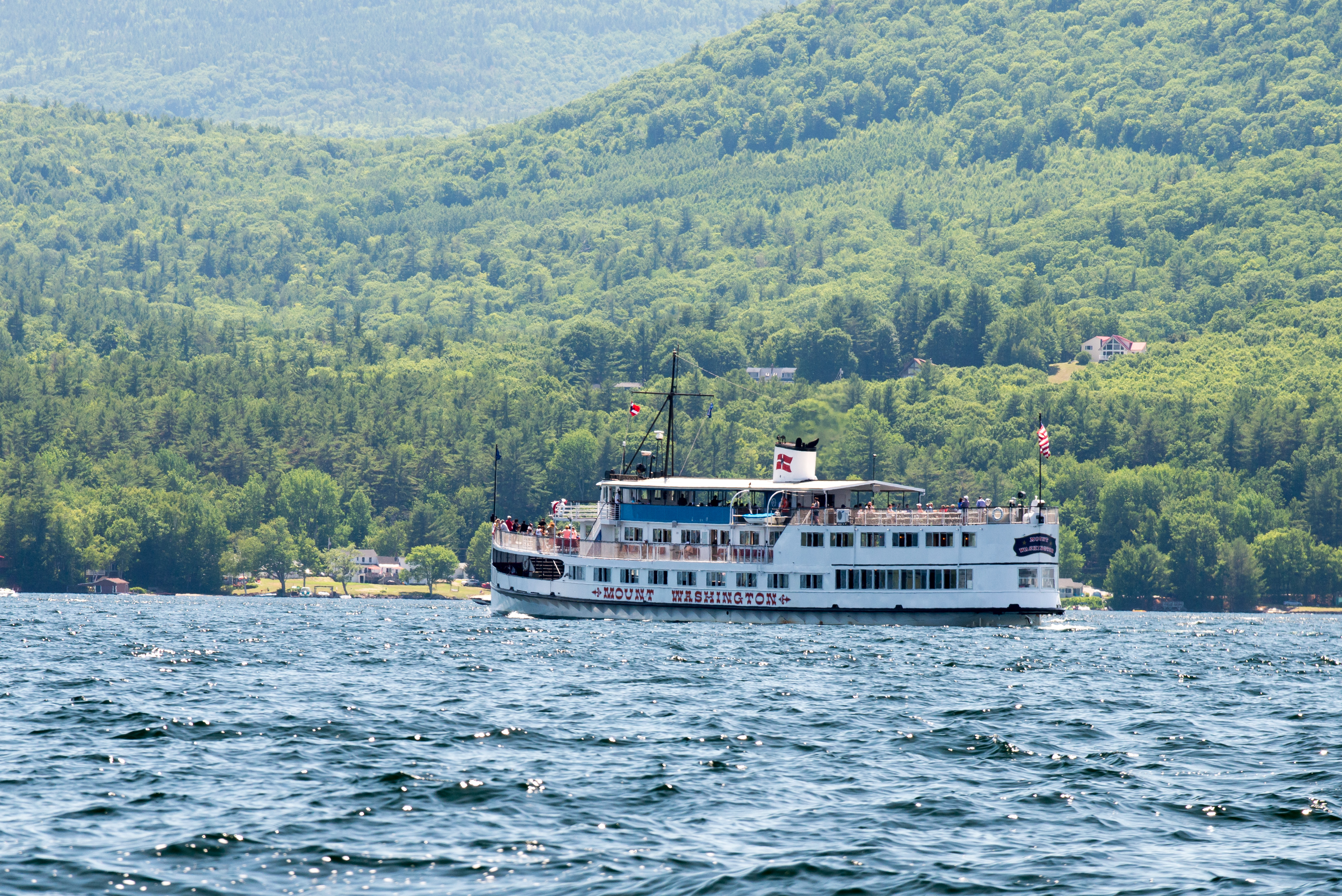
Mount Washington plying the waters on its route toward Wolfeboro

The Mount cruises the waters of Winnipesaukee from late May through late October. At the height of summer she will embark on up to four cruises a day. The Mount has five ports of call: Meredith Bay, Center Harbor, Wolfeboro, Alton Bay, and her home port of Weirs Beach. At night the boat travels the lake with no stops at ports for a scenic dinner dance cruise.

=== Winter harbor ===
In the winter the Mount stays at its winter home at the port in Center Harbor. Bubblers in the water around the Mount keep the water from freezing and protect the vessel from ice damage. There is also a marine railway at Center Harbor that can be used to pull the ship entirely from the water. The task of pulling the Mount from the lake is a large one and only undertaken when a major maintenance job requires it.

== Sister ships ==
The MS Mount Washington has three smaller sister ships in the fleet. Doris and Sophie were constructed from spare boat parts from the US Navy following World War II, and the MV Winnipesaukee Spirit was launched in 1979 by Lydia Boat Works of Fort Pierce, Florida.

=== MV Doris E ===
The Doris E opened in 1962 makes daily scenic island cruises and stops in the port of Meredith. The Doris is 68 feet (21 m) in length and has its own snack bar, drinks, and bathroom. The boat stopped operating and retired in 2021.

=== MV Sophie C ===
The Sophie C opened in 1946 is 76 feet (23 m) in length and was built by General Ship and Engine Works in East Boston, Massachusetts She was christened "Sophie C" after Sophie Hedblom, wife of Carl Hedblom and mother of Byron Hedblom, owners of General Ship and Engine Works as well as the Winnipesaukee Steamship Corporation. The vessel was built to offer service on Lake Winnipesaukee while the M/V Mount Washington was out of commission due to the U.S. government requisitioning her engines for the war effort. The Sophie C is the oldest floating post office (and only inland floating post office) in the continental United States, and is the fifth boat to deliver mail on the lake. It cruises daily except for Sunday, delivering the mail to island residents.

=== Winnipesaukee Spirit ===
The Winnipesaukee Spirit was added to the fleet for the 2021 operating season. Originally launched in Fort Pierce, Florida, in 1979, the Spirit last did marine charters in New Jersey before being brought to New Hampshire by the Winnipesaukee Flagship Corporation. The Spirit is equipped with its own bar and galley area and has indoor/outdoor seating as well as two lounge areas. The Spirit can also carry up to 99 general passengers and can seat up to 88 for dinner.

=== Winnipesaukee Belle ===
On March 30, 2023, Mount Washington Crises announced the acquisition of the Winnipesaukee Belle. The boat was previously owned by the Wolfeboro Inn. It is 65 feet in length and can accommodate up to 150 passengers. The vessel will undergo refurbishment at the shipyards in Center Harbor, and will return to service in 2026.

MS Mount Washington at dock along with her smaller sister ship the MV Sophie C

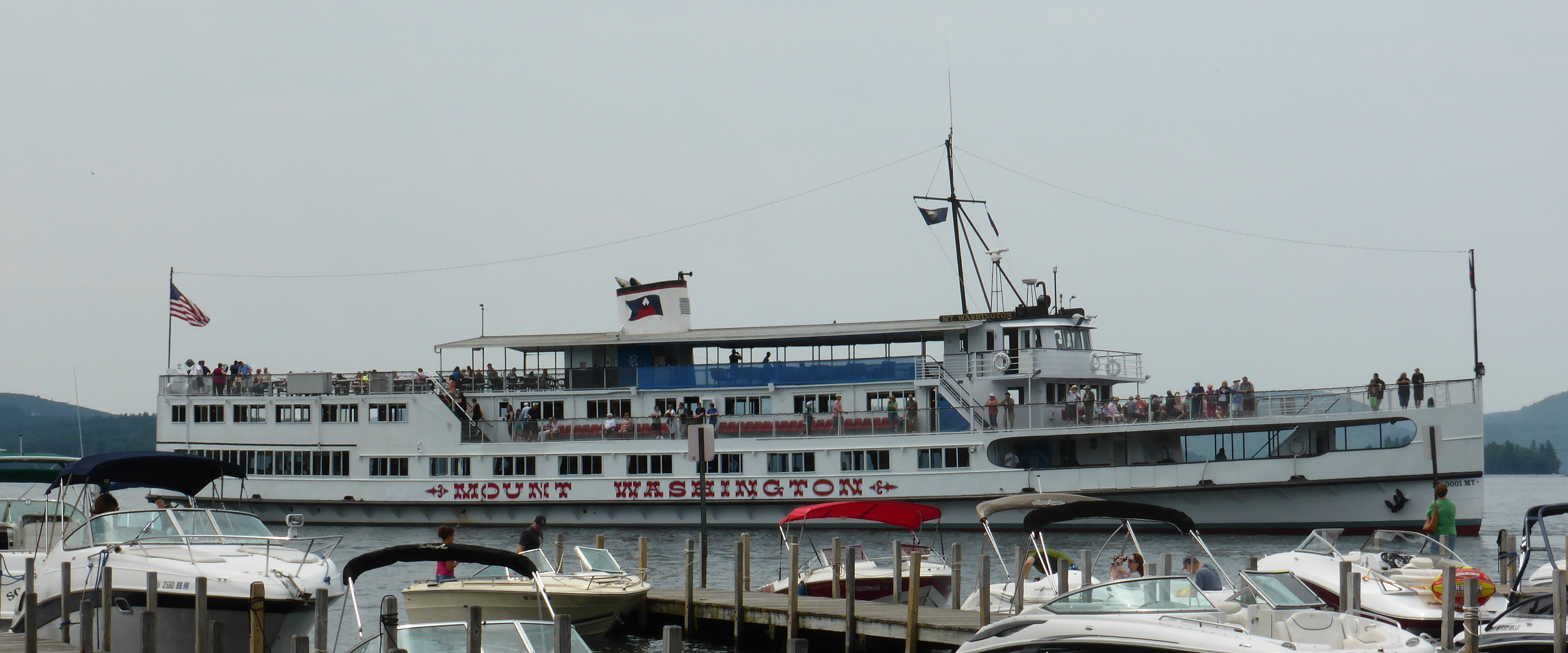
MS Mount Washington at Wolfeboro town dock

== See also ==
- Landlocked lake steamers of North America
