= Meredith, New Hampshire =

- Town
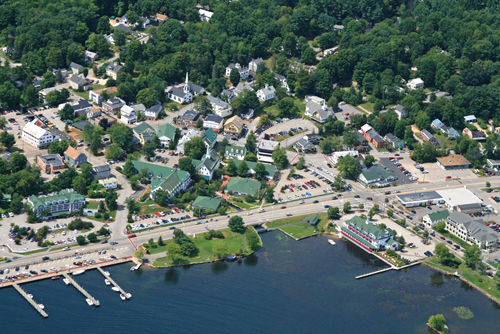
- Bird's-eye view of Meredith village

- Flag Seal

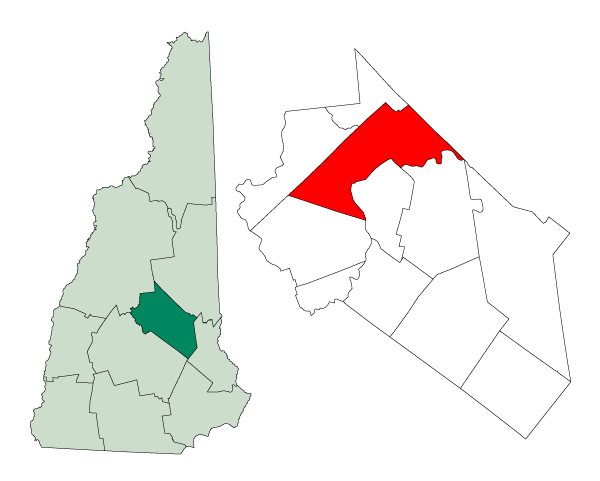
- Location in Belknap County, New Hampshire
- Coordinates: 43°37′48″N 71°30′06″W
- Country: United States
- State: New Hampshire
- County: Belknap
- Incorporated: 1768
- Villages: Meredith; Meredith Center

Area
  - Total: 54.6 sq mi (141.3 km^{2})
  - Land: 40.1 sq mi (103.8 km^{2})
  - Water: 14.5 sq mi (37.5 km^{2}) 26.56%
- Elevation: 889 ft (271 m)

Population (2020)
  - Total: 6,662
  - Density: 166/sq mi (64.2/km^{2})
- Time zone: UTC−5 (Eastern)
  - Summer (DST): UTC−4 (Eastern)
- ZIP Code: 03253
- Area code: 603
- FIPS code: 33-47140
- GNIS feature ID: 873662
- Website: www.meredithnh.gov

Meredith is a town in Belknap County, New Hampshire, United States. The population was 6,662 at the 2020 census, and an estimated 6,854 in 2025. Meredith is situated in the state's Lakes Region and serves as a major resort town. Meredith Village, the commercial center of the town, lies along the shores of Lake Winnipesaukee, and several other large lakes lie partially or completely within the town borders. It is home to the Stonedam Island Natural Area and the Winnipesaukee Scenic Railroad, and it serves as one of the ports of call for the MS Mount Washington.

Meredith Village, where 2,527 people resided at the 2020 census, is defined as the Meredith census-designated place, and is located at the junction of U.S. Route 3 and New Hampshire Route 25 at the head of Meredith Bay on Lake Winnipesaukee.

== History ==
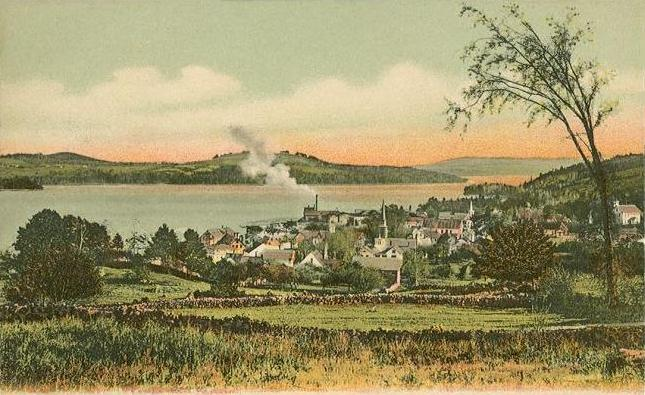
Meredith village c. 1905

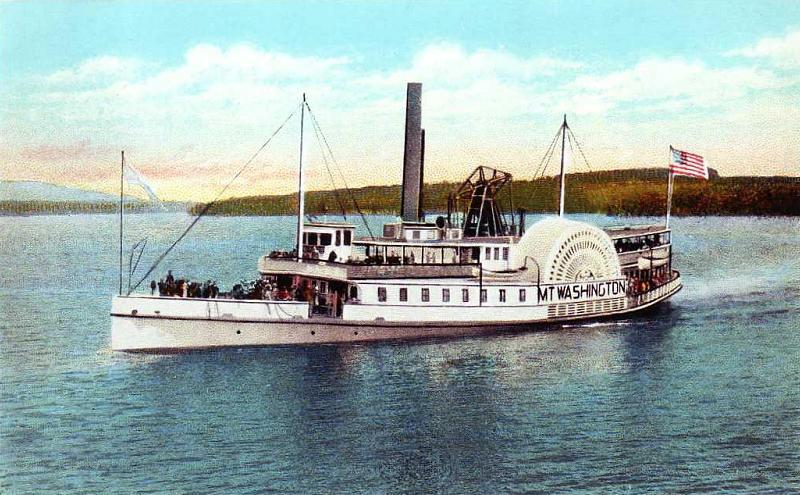
Original SS Mount Washington (1872–1939). Image c. 1920

Meredith was first known as "Palmer's Town" in honor of Samuel Palmer, a teacher of surveying and navigation who laid out much of the land surrounding Lake Winnipesaukee. In 1748, it was one of the first towns to have a charter granted by the Masonian Proprietors. Many grantees were from Salem, Massachusetts, so Palmer's Town was renamed "New Salem". It was settled in 1766 by Jacob Eaton and Colonel Ebenezer Smith, then regranted in 1768 by Governor John Wentworth and named after Sir William Meredith, 3rd Baronet, a member of Parliament who opposed taxation on the colonies.

Farmers grew corn, wheat, rye and potatoes, but the area became noted for apple orchards.

The water rights to the natural Measly Pond Brook (a.k.a. Corliss Brook) was purchased by John Jenness in 1795, and used to power a gristmill and sawmill in Meredith Village, though it was not the best local waterpower source. The brook drained Lake Waukewan into Lake Winnipesauke.

In 1800, John Bond Swasey inherited a 95-acre (38 ha) farm which covered most of what is now Meredith Village. After his marriage in 1809, he gradually purchased land on both sides of the Measly Pond Brook, related water rights, and several mills.

From 1816 to 1818, Swasey constructed a 600-foot (180 m) rock-lined canal that redirected the flow from Lake Waukewan, and created a 30-foot (9.1 m) drop at a single rock-lined sluiceway at what is now the Mill Falls Marketplace. The new, more powerful waterfall ran sawmills, gristmills, cotton mills, and in 1895, the Meredith Electric Light Company.

By 1859 Meredith village had a sawmill, gristmill, shingle mill, blacksmith shop, harness-maker's shop and tannery. Situated at the outlet of Wickwas Lake, Meredith Center had a sawmill, gristmill and blacksmith shop. Connected by the Boston, Concord & Montreal Railroad in March 1849, the town became a summer resort. Passengers also arrived from the Alton Bay depot aboard steamboats, the most famous of which was the original SS Mount Washington, launched in 1872. Meredith remains a popular tourist destination.

In 1974, the Swasey family donated land to create Swasey Park on Lake Waukewan near the beginning of the canal.

== Geography ==
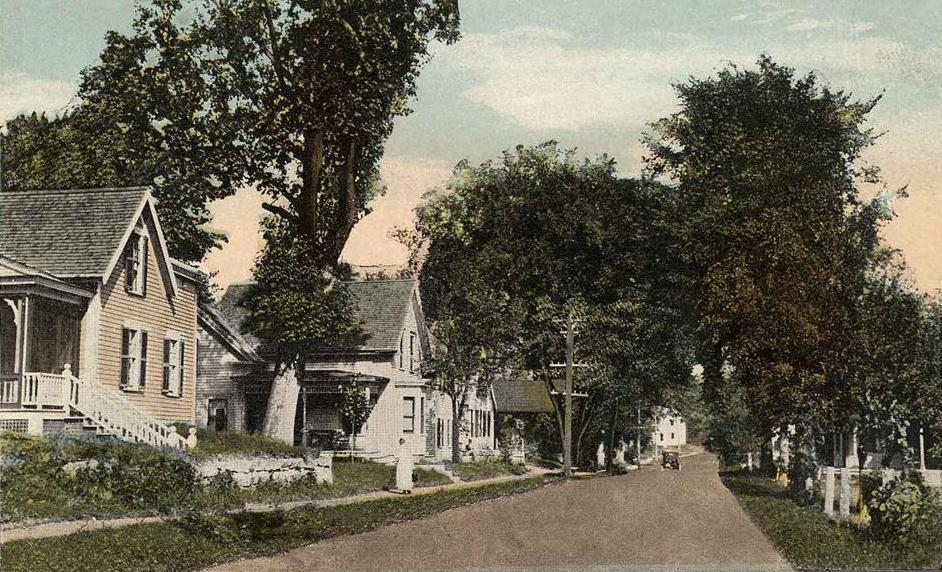
Plymouth Street c. 1920

According to the United States Census Bureau, the town has a total area of 54.6 square miles (141.3 km^{2}), of which 40.1 square miles (103.8 km^{2}) are land and 14.5 square miles (37.5 km^{2}), or 26.37%, are water. The highest point in Meredith is the summit of Leavitt Mountain, elevation 1,414 feet (431 m) above sea level, in the southwestern part of town.

Meredith village is the commercial hub of the town, lying between the northern tip of Meredith Bay (one of several large arms of Lake Winnipesaukee) and Lake Waukewan. A second village, Meredith Center, is located near the shores of Lake Wickwas closer to the geographic center of the town. Meredith Center has much less commercial development than Meredith Village, being located near several protected state forests and wildlife areas.

The town is crossed by U.S. Route 3, New Hampshire Route 25, New Hampshire Route 104, and New Hampshire Route 106. It is bordered by the towns of Sanbornton to the southwest, New Hampton to the west, Center Harbor to the north, Moultonborough to the northeast across Lake Winnipesaukee, Gilford to the southeast, and Laconia to the south.

Like many other towns of the Lakes Region, Meredith is dominated by several large bodies of water. About half of the town's southeastern boundary with its neighbor Laconia is occupied by Lake Winnisquam, while the northern half of town lies within a peninsula, Meredith Neck, that separates Meredith Bay from the main body of Lake Winnipesaukee, giving Meredith an extensive coastline. Bear Island, the second largest on Winnipesaukee, and Stonedam Island, along with dozens of smaller islands are also part of the town. Several smaller lakes lie between Winnipesaukee and Winnisquam, including Wickwas Lake and Pemigewasset Lake. Lake Waukewan forms the western edge of the Meredith Village CDP and extends into neighboring New Hampton.

=== Climate ===
The Köppen Climate Classification subtype for this climate is "Dfb" (Humid Continental Climate).

Climate data for Meredith, New Hampshire, 1991–2020 normals, extremes 2009–2020
Month	Jan	Feb	Mar	Apr	May	Jun	Jul	Aug	Sep	Oct	Nov	Dec	Year
Record high °F (°C)	60 (16)	66 (19)	82 (28)	88 (31)	92 (33)	94 (34)	96 (36)	93 (34)	92 (33)	81 (27)	70 (21)	61 (16)	96 (36)
Mean daily maximum °F (°C)	29.1 (−1.6)	32.3 (0.2)	41.2 (5.1)	54.2 (12.3)	67.1 (19.5)	75.4 (24.1)	80.6 (27.0)	79.4 (26.3)	71.4 (21.9)	57.8 (14.3)	44.9 (7.2)	34.1 (1.2)	55.6 (13.1)
Daily mean °F (°C)	21.2 (−6.0)	23.7 (−4.6)	32.1 (0.1)	44.3 (6.8)	56.2 (13.4)	65.4 (18.6)	70.5 (21.4)	69.1 (20.6)	61.5 (16.4)	48.8 (9.3)	37.6 (3.1)	27.4 (−2.6)	46.5 (8.0)
Mean daily minimum °F (°C)	13.3 (−10.4)	15.0 (−9.4)	23.0 (−5.0)	34.3 (1.3)	45.3 (7.4)	55.3 (12.9)	60.3 (15.7)	58.8 (14.9)	51.6 (10.9)	39.8 (4.3)	30.2 (−1.0)	20.6 (−6.3)	37.3 (2.9)
Record low °F (°C)	−14 (−26)	−15 (−26)	−3 (−19)	13 (−11)	30 (−1)	35 (2)	48 (9)	44 (7)	34 (1)	24 (−4)	1 (−17)	−10 (−23)	−15 (−26)
Average precipitation inches (mm)	3.34 (85)	2.84 (72)	3.45 (88)	3.89 (99)	3.76 (96)	4.53 (115)	4.36 (111)	3.99 (101)	4.10 (104)	4.92 (125)	3.96 (101)	4.23 (107)	47.37 (1,204)
Average snowfall inches (cm)	18.1 (46)	19.6 (50)	15.4 (39)	4.2 (11)	0.0 (0.0)	0.0 (0.0)	0.0 (0.0)	0.0 (0.0)	0.0 (0.0)	0.8 (2.0)	3.9 (9.9)	17.7 (45)	79.7 (202.9)
Average precipitation days (≥ 0.01 in)	10.3	8.6	10.3	10.9	12.4	12.7	10.6	10.0	9.8	11.0	10.4	11.5	128.5
Average snowy days (≥ 0.1 in)	7.5	6.8	5.8	2.3	0.0	0.0	0.0	0.0	0.0	0.5	2.0	6.7	31.6
Source 1: NOAA
Source 2: National Weather Service

=== Adjacent municipalities ===
- Center Harbor (north)
- Moultonborough (northeast)
- Gilford (southeast)
- Laconia (south)
- Sanbornton (southwest)
- New Hampton (west)

== Demographics ==
Historical population
Census	Pop.	Note	%±
1790	881		—
1800	1,609		82.6%
1810	1,940		20.6%
1820	2,416		24.5%
1830	2,683		11.1%
1840	3,344		24.6%
1850	3,521		5.3%
1860	1,944		−44.8%
1870	1,807		−7.0%
1880	1,800		−0.4%
1890	1,642		−8.8%
1900	1,713		4.3%
1910	1,638		−4.4%
1920	1,680		2.6%
1930	1,902		13.2%
1940	2,192		15.2%
1950	2,222		1.4%
1960	2,434		9.5%
1970	2,904		19.3%
1980	4,646		60.0%
1990	4,837		4.1%
2000	5,943		22.9%
2010	6,241		5.0%
2020	6,662		6.7%
2024 (est.)	6,829		2.5%
U.S. Decennial Census

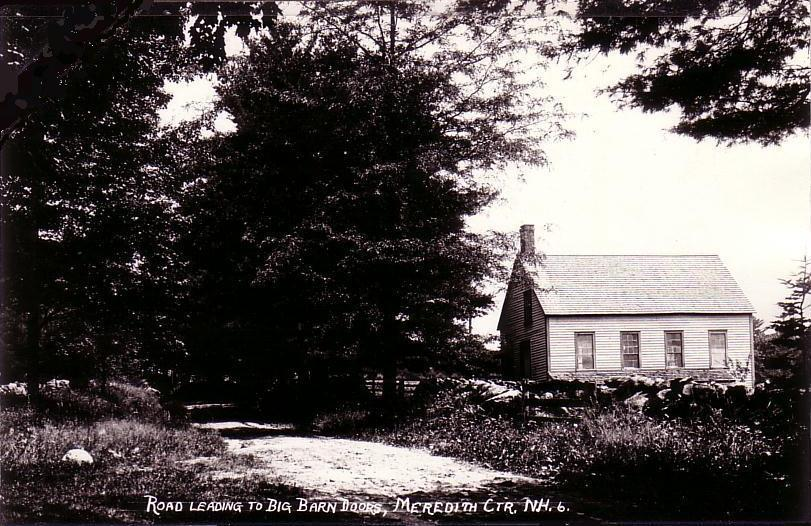
Street scene in Meredith Center c. 1912

As of the 2010 census, there were 6,241 people, 2,708 households, and 1,777 families residing in the town. There were 4,728 housing units, of which 2,020, or 42.7%, were vacant. Of the vacant units, 1,710 were for seasonal or recreational use. The racial makeup of the town was 97.3% White, 0.3% African American, 0.2% Native American, 0.9% Asian, 0.0% Native Hawaiian or Pacific Islander, 0.3% some other race, and 1.0% from two or more races. Of the population, 1.1% were Hispanic or Latino of any race.

Of the 2,941 households, 25.5% had children under the age of 18 living with them, 51.4% were headed by married couples living together, 9.9% had a female householder with no husband present, and 34.4% were non-families. Of all households, 27.5% were made up of individuals, and 11.6% were someone living alone who was 65 years of age or older. The average household size was 2.27, and the average family size was 2.71.

In the town, 18.6% of the population were under the age of 18, 5.8% were from 18 to 24, 19.7% from 25 to 44, 34.9% from 45 to 64, and 20.8% were 65 years of age or older. The median age was 48.7 years. For every 100 females, there were 93.6 males. For every 100 females age 18 and over, there were 91.3 males.

For the period 2011–2015, the estimated median annual income for a household was $63,028, and the median income for a family was $80,076. Male full-time workers had a median income of $62,944 versus $42,734 for females. The per capita income for the town was $36,510; 12.4% of the population and 8.7% of families were below the poverty line. Of the population, 22.5% under the age of 18 and 7.1% of those 65 or older were living in poverty.

== Government ==
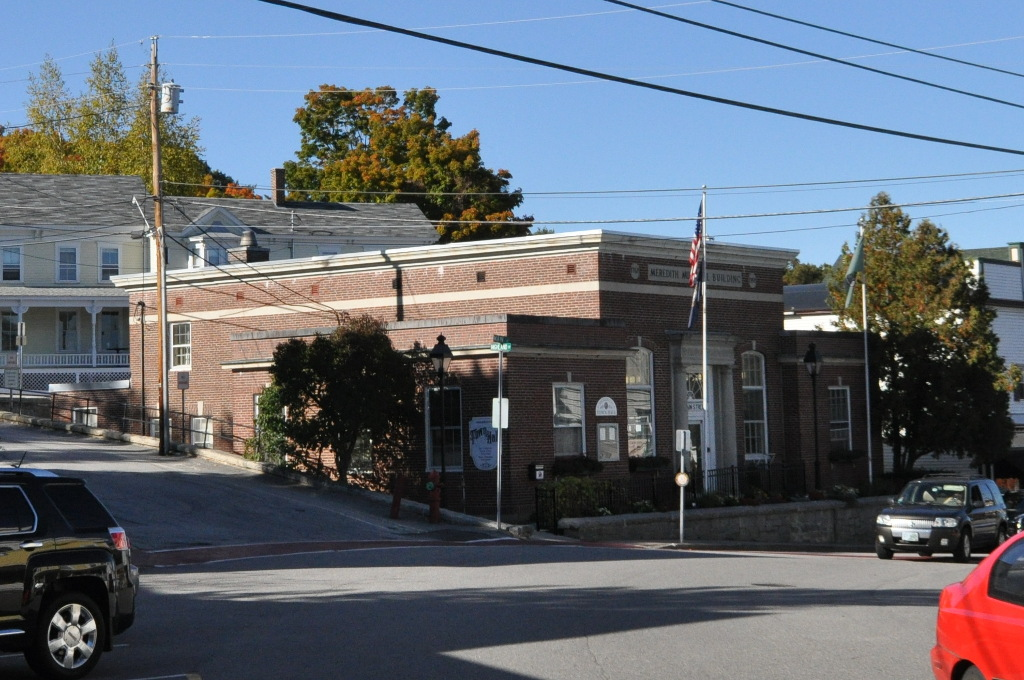
Town hall

In the New Hampshire Senate, Meredith is in the 2nd district, represented by Republican Bob Giuda. On the New Hampshire Executive Council, Meredith is in the 1st district, represented by Republican Joseph Kenney. In the United States House of Representatives, Meredith is in New Hampshire's 1st congressional district, represented by Democrat Chris Pappas.

== Education ==
Meredith's Inter-Lakes Middle High School is home to the Inter-Lakes Community Auditorium, which plays host to the Summer Theatre in Meredith Village (formerly the Lakes Region Summer Theater) every summer. Inter-Lakes Elementary School serves children from Meredith and neighboring Center Harbor. The high school also includes students from the town of Sandwich.

== Notable people ==
- Bradford Anderson (born 1979), actor
- Samuel Newell Bell (1829–1889), US congressman
- Charles A. Busiel (1842–1901), US congressman and the 45th governor of New Hampshire
- George G. Fogg (1813–1881), U.S. senator, diplomat
- Joseph Libbey Folsom (1817–1855), army officer, real estate investor
- Samuel Green (1796–1822), serial killer executed by hanging
- Dudley Leavitt (1772–1851), publisher
- Bob Montana (1920–1975), illustrator of Archie Comics
- George Orton (1873–1958), Canadian middle-distance runner; Olympic gold medalist
- Eben Ezra Roberts (1866–1943), architect
- Daniel E. Somes (1815–1888), U.S. congressman
- Annalee Thorndike (1915–2002), doll designer
- Herb Vadney, politician

== Sites of interest ==
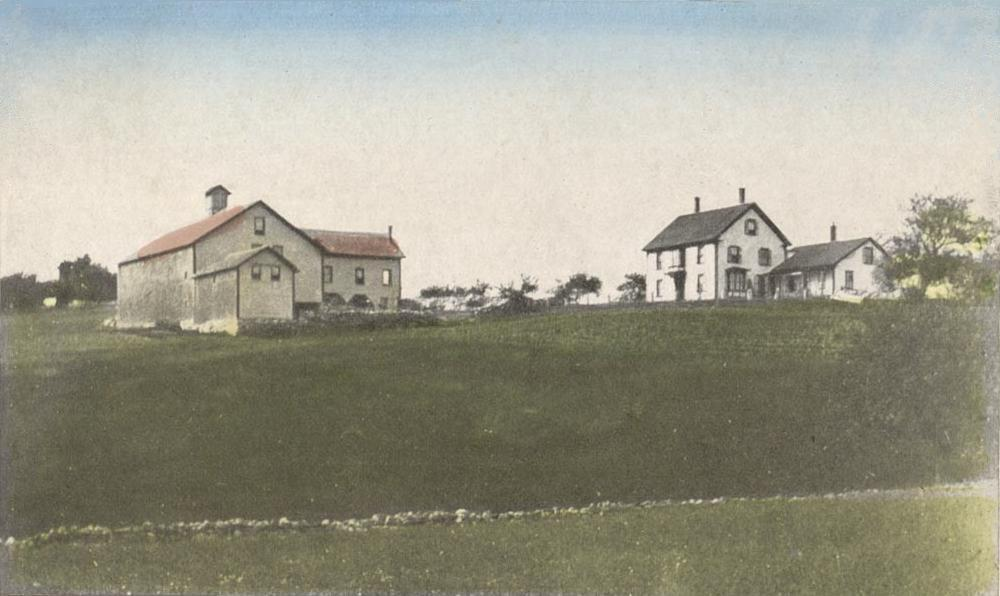
Ridgefield Farm in 1917

Museums

- Meredith Children's Museum
- Meredith Historical Society & Museum

Regional theatres and summer stock

- The Summer Theatre in Meredith Village
- In 2008 the Winnipesaukee Playhouse purchased the former Annalee Dolls factory in Meredith. In 2013, the theatre completed construction of its new facility and moved from its former site in Weirs Beach to the site of the former Annalee gift shop.

Islands

- Bear Island
- Pine Island

Other

- Lakes Region Symphony Orchestra
- Hart's Turkey Farm
