= Hart's Turkey Farm =

- Interactive map of Hart's Turkey Farm

Restaurant information
- Established: 1954
- Owner: Sam Willey
- Food type: American
- Dress code: Casual
- Location: 233 Daniel Webster Hwy, Meredith, Belknap County, New Hampshire, 03253, United States
- Coordinates: 43.64744263936917°N 71.49953978465875°W
- Seating capacity: 600
- Website: hartsturkeyfarm.com

Hart's Turkey Farm is a restaurant in Meredith, New Hampshire, United States. The restaurant opened in 1954 and has a large menu showcasing turkey dishes.

== History ==
In 1946, brothers Larry and Russ Hart, and wives Helen and Gerda, moved to the Lakes Region of New Hampshire from the New Jersey suburbs. The Hart family had vacationed in the Lakes Region since the 1920s. They started a farm. They sold produce and meat out of a truck, including chicken, turkey, fruit and vegetables.

By 1953, the Hart family started raising only turkeys. In 1954, they opened a small restaurant that seated twelve in Meredith, New Hampshire. The restaurant served turkey sandwiches and dinners with Hart's Turkey Farm turkey. Larry died in 1960, and Russ became the sole owner of the farm and restaurant. By 1965, Russ Hart quit farming to expand and operate the restaurant full-time. He decided to source turkeys from other farms using strict standards.

Lynn, Dale, Russell T., and Glenn Hart—the children of Russ and Helen—purchased the restaurant in 1986. Today, the restaurant Hart family member Sam Wiley.

The restaurant opened a second location in Manchester, New Hampshire, in 2008. The second location was temporarily closed for renovations in 2011. Mitt Romney visited the Meredith location during the 2012 presidential election. As of 2021, the second location was permanently closed. In 2014, Hart's hosted a tourism industry open house for its 60th anniversary. Over 600 people attended. In 2018, a tanker truck rolled over in front of the restaurant, causing minor damage to the building.

During the summer, the restaurant has 230 employees. Due to the economic impact of the COVID-19 pandemic, the restaurant was approximately 100 employees short in 2021. Willey owns two apartment buildings to support workers and provides reduced rent to employees.

Hart's sponsors an annual Thanksgiving dinner providing complimentary meals for families and individuals in need or celebrating the holiday alone. They also operate a catering company. Katharine Hepburn and Caroline Kennedy have dined at the original Hart's Turkey Farm.

== Restaurant design and style ==
Hart's Turkey Farm is a large white building surrounded by parking lots. The entrance has a gift shop. In 2011, ABC News' Larry Olmstead described the restaurant as having "a bit of a truck stop feel" and a "practical New England feel." The restaurant is divided into multiple dining rooms, which can seat over 500 individuals combined. The rooms have wood-paneled walls, and each room has a collection of plates and dishes with turkey motifs on display. There are over 1,000 platters in the collection, which was started by Mae Hart. The restaurant also includes a bar and bakery.

== Cuisine ==
The restaurant used to sell dishes made with Hart's Turkey Farm turkeys. Today, they source turkeys from other farms, with their biggest supplier being from Utah. The extensive menu has numerous turkey-centric dishes on it.

Hart's most popular meal is a Thanksgiving-style meal offered daily. The meal includes roasted turkey served in three portion sizes, with over a pound being the largest portion. The price, as of 2014, was $22.95, including sides. A turkey drumstick dinner is also available. As of 2011, it was $10.99.

They also sell turkey sandwiches, including turkey meatball sandwiches, a "Turkey Gobbler" sandwich topped with stuffing, cranberry sauce, and mayo, and a turkey Rueben. They also serve turkey variations on chicken divan, chicken alfredo, and cheesesteaks. The restaurant also sells appetizers including croquette made of turkey, turkey nuggets, potstickers filled with turkey, turkey quesadillas, turkey soup, tempura turkey, and sauteed turkey liver with onion, cranberry relish, and mushrooms.

Non-turkey dishes include hamburgers and pasta. They also sell fried clams and lobster rolls during the summer. Hart's makes their own salad dressing, mashed potatoes, chowders, and relish made with carrot. They also make their own ice cream. The cranberry sauce is from a can.

As of 2011, the restaurant sold over a ton of turkey, 1,000 pounds of potatoes, 4,000 bread rolls, 40 gallons of gravy, and 1,000 pies daily. In 2021, the restaurant sold an average of 100 40-pound turkeys daily. On Thanksgiving Day, the restaurant sells 1,600 turkey dinners onsite and 180 dinners for takeout.

== Reception ==
In 2011, ABC News' Larry Olmstead described Hart's Turkey Farm as having "attentive, friendly small-town service and the unique atmosphere" and having a "novelty." He called the food "quite good." He called the stuffing "very good", the mashed potatoes "rich and decadent" and the desserts "excellent." Local Dartmouth College administrator, Gregg Cerveny, called the restaurant "a New Hampshire institution." The restaurant has been featured on the Phantom Gourmet and the Travel Channel. The Michelin Guide has also profiled the restaurant.
