= List of cemeteries in New Hampshire =

This list of cemeteries in New Hampshire includes currently operating, historical (closed for new interments), and defunct (graves abandoned or removed) cemeteries, columbaria, and mausolea which are historical and/or notable. It does not include pet cemeteries.

== Cheshire County ==
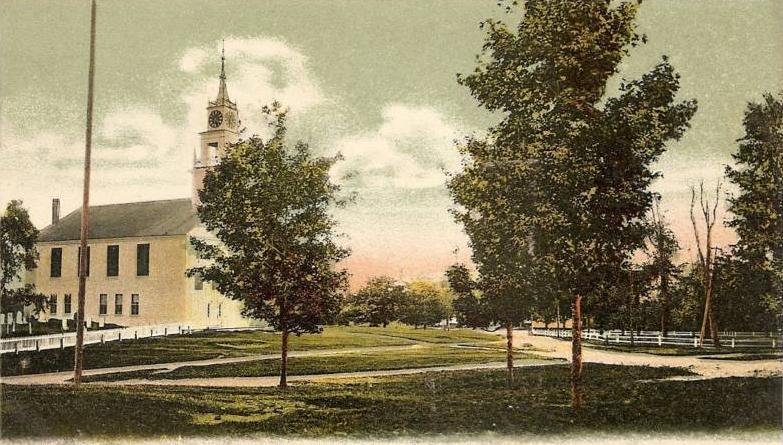
Second Rindge Meetinghouse, Horsesheds and Cemetery, Rindge, Cheshire County

- Cathedral of the Pines in Rindge
- Second Rindge Meetinghouse, Horsesheds and Cemetery in Rindge; NRHP-listed

== Hillsborough County ==
- Signer's House and Matthew Thornton Cemetery in Merrimack; NRHP-listed
- St. Joseph Cemetery in Manchester
- Valley Cemetery in Manchester; NRHP-listed

== Merrimack County ==
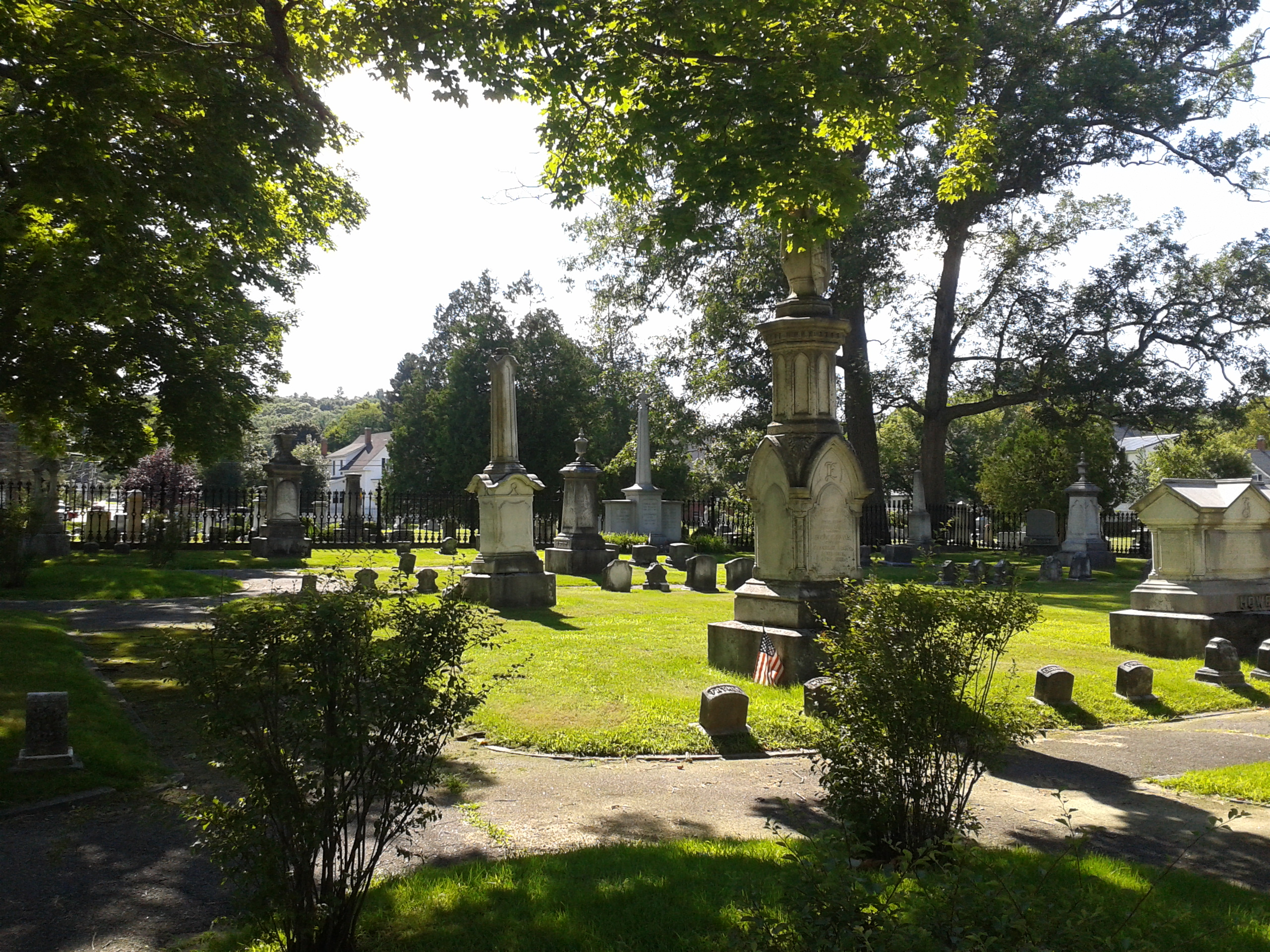
Old North Cemetery (2014), Concord, Merrimack County

- Blossom Hill and Calvary Cemeteries in Concord; NRHP-listed
- Old North Cemetery in Concord; NRHP-listed

== Rockingham County ==
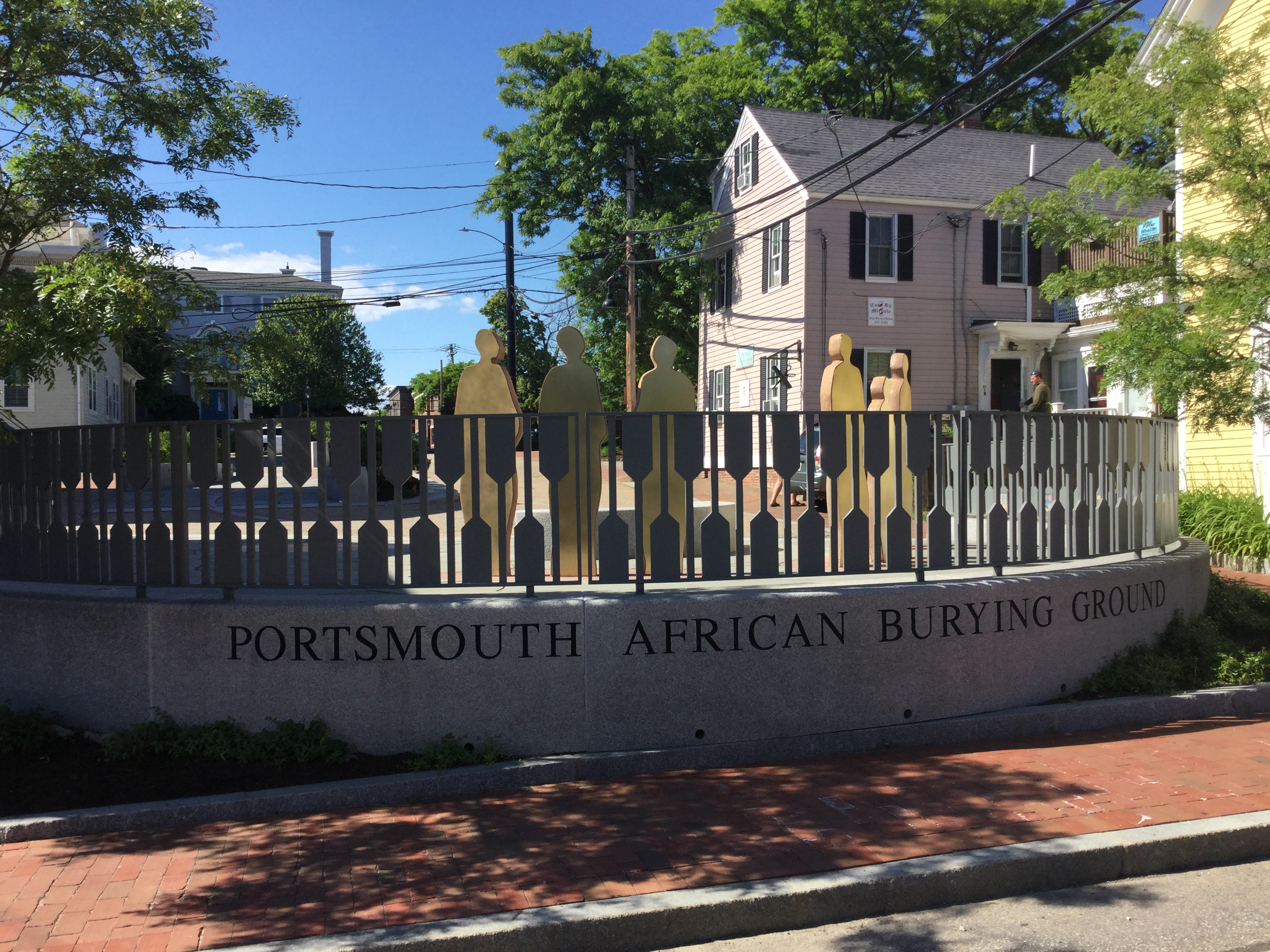
Portsmouth African Burying Ground, Portsmouth, Rockingham County

- Chester Village Cemetery in Chester; NRHP-listed
- Old North Cemetery in Portsmouth; NRHP-listed
- Plains Cemetery in Kingston; NRHP-listed
- Point of Graves Burial Ground in Portsmouth
- Portsmouth African Burying Ground in Portsmouth

== Strafford County ==
- Forest Glade Cemetery in Somersworth; NRHP-listed
- Pine Hill Cemetery in Dover

== Sullivan County ==
- Cemetery at Trinity Church in Cornish

== See also ==
- List of cemeteries in the United States
