= Sam Walter Foss =

American poet (1858–1911)

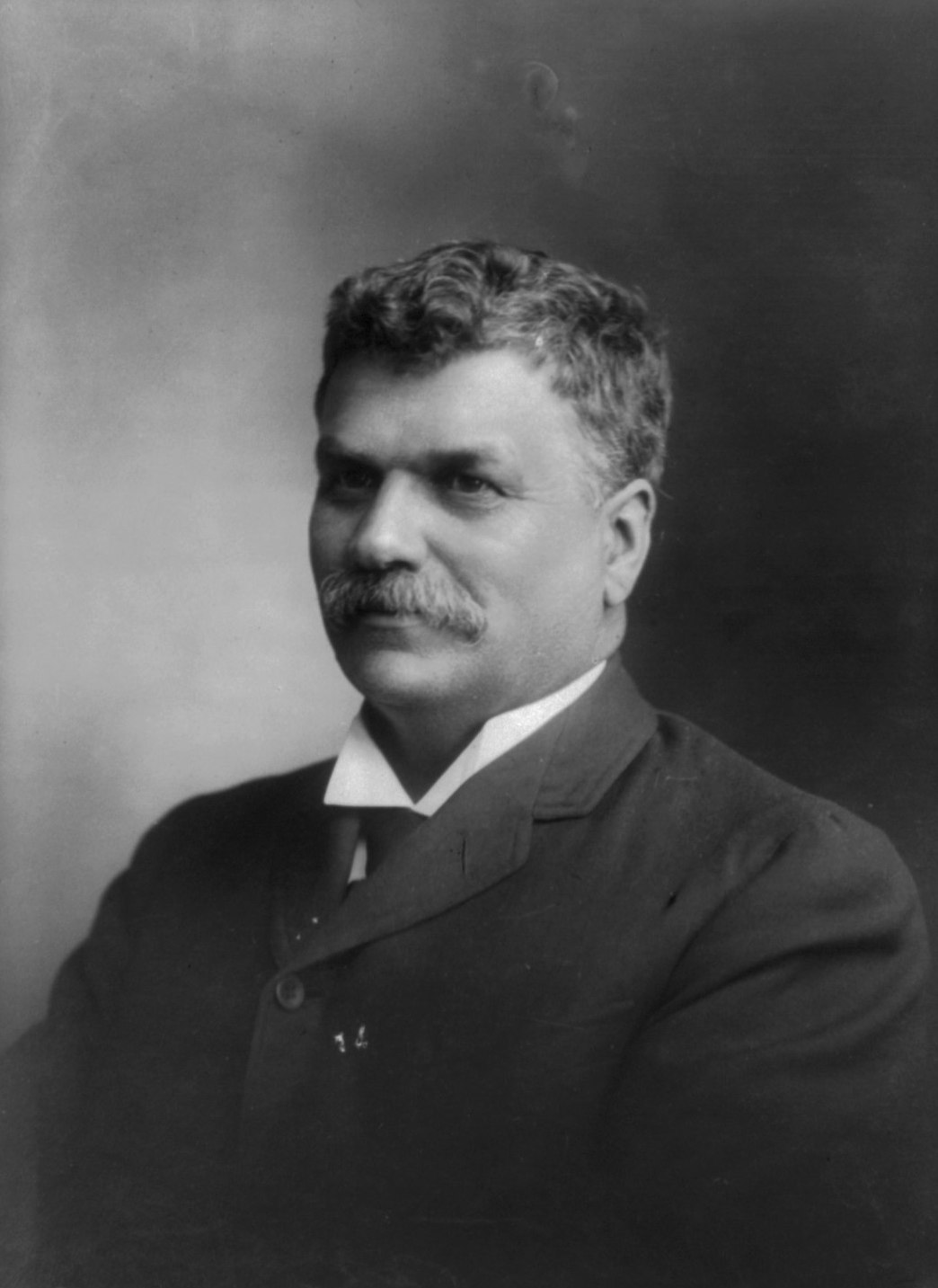
- Born: June 19, 1858; Candia, New Hampshire
- Died: February 26, 1911 (aged 52); Boston, Massachusetts
- Resting place: Providence, Rhode Island
- Education: Tilton School; Brown University
- Occupations: Librarian, poet
- Writing career
- Notable works: "The Coming American", "The House by the Side of the Road"

Sam Walter Foss (June 19, 1858 – February 26, 1911) was an American librarian and poet whose best-known works included "The Coming American" and "The House by the Side of the Road".

== Life and career ==
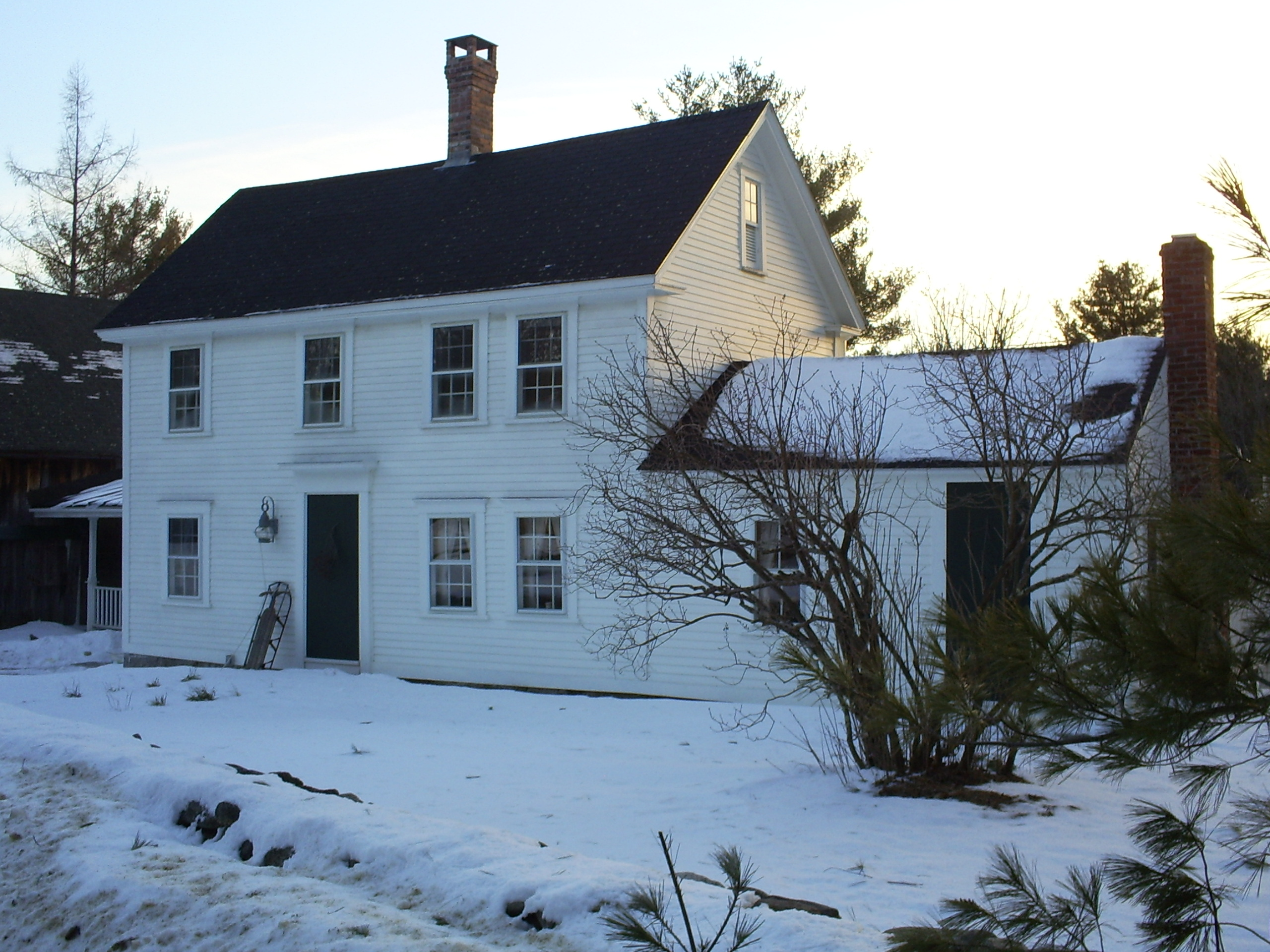
Birthplace of Sam Foss in Candia, New Hampshire

Foss was born in rural Candia, New Hampshire, the son of Polly (Hardy) and Dyer Foss. His mother died when he was four years old, and he worked on his father's farm and went to school in the winter. Foss attended the Tilton Seminary, now Tilton School, before attending and graduating from Brown University in 1882. He would eventually be considered illustrious enough to warrant having his name inscribed on the mace.

Beginning in 1898, Foss served as librarian at the Somerville Public Library in Massachusetts. He married a minister's daughter, with whom he had a daughter and son. Foss used to write a poem a day for the newspapers, and his five volumes of collected poetry are of the frank and homely “common man” variety.

Foss is buried in the North Burial Ground in Providence, Rhode Island. He is featured on a New Hampshire historical marker (number 114) along New Hampshire Route 43 in Candia. The house that Foss resided in during his time at Tilton Seminary was added to the National Register of Historic Places in 1980, as "House by the Side of the Road". Which house Foss had in mind when he wrote the like-named poem—in Candia during his childhood or in Tilton during his education—has been a matter of some dispute.

== Influence ==
Foss's most famous poem is "The Coming American", which was published in his 1895 book Whiffs from Wild Meadows. The poem rambles aimlessly through six pages about America's past, present, and future before turning to its most famous section: a "call" supposedly sent by "our Great Fate" to the future of America. The call begins as follows: "Bring me men to match my mountains / Bring me men to match my plains / Men with empires in their purpose / And new eras in their brains."

The poem is engraved and displayed at Epcot in Orlando, Florida, and also inscribed onto the Rocky Mountain Cup trophy, which is contested annually between Major League Soccer teams Real Salt Lake and Colorado Rapids. The first line of the call is displayed prominently on the south facade of the Jesse M. Unruh State Office Building in Sacramento, California.

Large lettering stating "bring me men" was displayed at the United States Air Force Academy on an arch that cadets would pass under, from 1964 until being removed in reaction to the 2003 Air Force Academy sexual assault scandal.

Singer Lamya's song "Empires (Bring Me Men)" takes its opening lyrics from "The Coming American", and the poem serves as inspiration for the rest of the song.

Longtime baseball announcer Ernie Harwell alluded to Foss's "The House by the Side of the Road" whenever he described a batter taking a called third strike: "He stood there like the house by the side of the road and watched it go by."

A recitation of Foss's Two Gods provides the lyrics to the song "A Greater God" by MC 900 Ft. Jesus.

== Works ==
- Back Country Poems (1892)
- Whiffs from Wild Meadows (1895)
- Dreams in Homespun (1897)
- Songs of War and Peace (1899)
- The Song of the Library Staff "Read at the annual meeting of the American Library Association, Narragansett Pier, July 6, 1906" (Published separately (details needed), but also included in 'Songs of the Average Man'(1906)
- Songs of the Average Man (1907)
