= White Park (Concord, New Hampshire) =

- U.S. National Register of Historic Places
- White Park Pond

- Location within New Hampshire Location within the United States
- Location: Bounded by Washington, Centre, High, Beacon, and White Sts., Concord, New Hampshire
- Coordinates: 43°12′23″N 71°32′53″W
- Area: 25 acres (10 ha)
- Built: 1884
- Architect: Eliot, Charles
- NRHP reference No.: 82000623
- Added to NRHP: November 9, 1982

White Park is a 25-acre (10 ha) public park on the west side of central Concord, New Hampshire. It occupies a roughly polygonal parcel of land surrounded by predominantly residential streets, with the University of New Hampshire School of Law located across White Street from the park's eastern corner. Its west side is characterized by a steep, rocky rise of about 40 feet (12 m) above an otherwise relatively flat landscape. The park's major features include a large man-made pond, and there are active recreational facilities, including basketball and handball courts, and a baseball diamond. The traditional main gate is located at the junction of Washington and Centre streets, with a wall section that includes a built-in structure originally used as a covered shelter for a streetcar stop. The pond is transformed into an outdoor skating rink in winter. The park is also home to the city's largest playground, called the Monkey Around Playground.

The park was established by a donation from Armenia White, a local philanthropist, and designed by Charles Eliot. Most of its basic landscaping, including the construction of two ponds, was completed in the 1890s. A number of the plantings lining the park's Washington Street boundary date to the initial period of development, and include several specimen trees and shrubs. The park's recreational facilities were expanded in the 1930s with funding from the Works Progress Administration, at which time the smaller of the two ponds was filled in, and replaced by a swimming pool. The park was listed on the National Register of Historic Places in 1982.

== See also ==
- White Farm, owned by the White family
- National Register of Historic Places listings in Merrimack County, New Hampshire
- New Hampshire Historical Marker No. 147: White Park
- New Hampshire Historical Marker No. 148: Sunset Baseball
