= Armenia S. White =

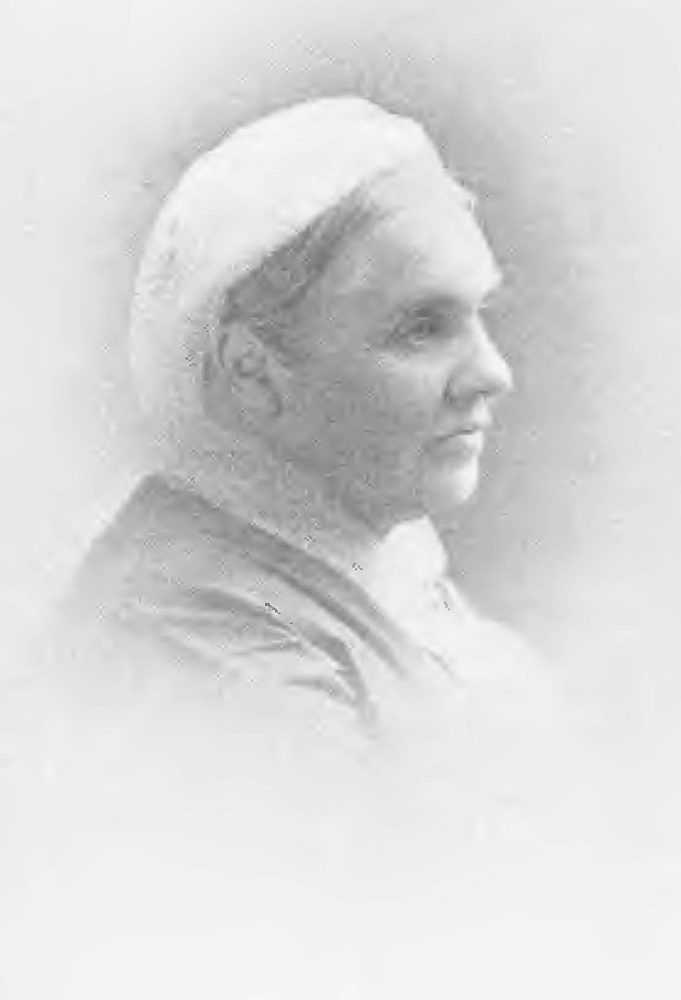
- Born: Armenia Smith Aldrich; November 1, 1817; Mendon, Massachusetts
- Died: May 7, 1916 (aged 98)
- Occupations: Philanthropist, suffragist
- Spouse: Nathaniel White (m. 1836–1880) his death

Armenia S. White (November 1, 1817 – May 7, 1916) was an American suffragist, philanthropist, and social reformer. She was the first president of the New Hampshire Woman's Suffrage Association, and was well known for her many years, along with her husband, Nathaniel White, of Concord, New Hampshire, in works of philanthropy and reform.

== Early years and education ==
Armenia Smith Aldrich was born in Mendon, Massachusetts, November 1, 1817, daughter of John and Harriet (Smith) Aldrich. Her direct paternal line of ancestry in the United States began with George Aldrich, who, with his wife Catherine, came from Derbyshire, England, in 1631, and in 1663 was among the early settlers of Mendon, removing there from Braintree, Massachusetts. Jacob Ahlrich, son of George, married Huldah, daughter of Ferdinando Thayer, and was the father of Moses, born in 1690. Moses Aldrich was a preacher of the Quakers in Rhode Island. He travelled as an approved minister, not only in the colonies later forming the original states of the American Union, but in the West Indies and in England. He married in 1711 Hannah White.

Judge Caleb Aldrich, son of Moses, is mentioned in the History of Woonsocket, Rhode Island, as father of Naaman and grandfather of John Aldrich, all of Smithfield, Rhode Island. Naaman was the father of John Aldrich, who was the father of Mrs. White.

White's maternal ancestry included three Mayflower Pilgrims, Edward Doty, Francis Cooke, and Stephen Hopkins, also Mr. Hopkins's second wife, Elizabeth, and their daughter Damaris, who both came with him to Plymouth, Massachusetts. White's mother, Harriet Smith Aldrich, was born, as recorded in Smithfield, February 21, 1795. She was a daughter of Samuel Smith and his wife, Hope Doten. Her parents were married at Plymouth, May 31, 1791, and moved to Smithfield. Samuel was a Revolutionary War soldier, born in Smithfield, enlisting in the American army at the age of sixteen years. The Doty-Doten genealogy shows that Hope Doten, born in Plymouth, in 1765, was daughter of James and Elizabeth (Kempton) Doten, and was descended from Edward Doty and his wife. Faith Clark, through John and Elizabeth (Cooke) Doty, Isaac' and Martha (Faunce) Doten, and Isaac* and Mary (Lanman) Doten, Isaac being father of James and grandfather of Hope Doten, White's maternal grandmother. Elizabeth, wife of John Doty (or Doten), was the daughter of Jacob Cooke (son of Francis') and his wife Damaris, daughter of Stephen Hopkins and his wife Elizabeth.

After the marriage of John Aldrich and Harriet Smith, they moved from Smithfield to Mendon. In 1830, Mr. and Mrs. John Aldrich removed from Mendon, to Boscawen, New Hampshire. Their daughter, Armenia, was educated in the public schools.

== Career ==
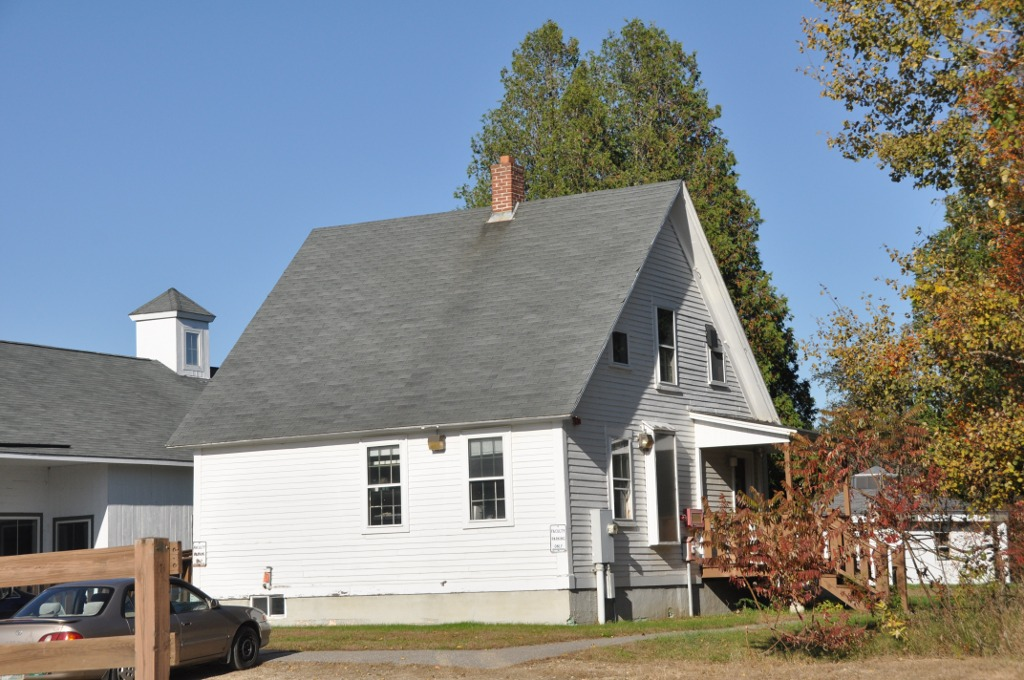
White Farm

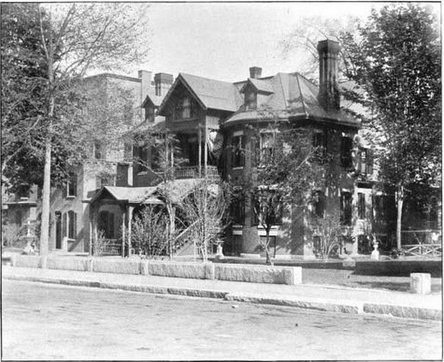
White residence, whose grounds were situated from School to Capitol streets (1894)

On November 1, 1836, on her nineteenth birthday, she married Nathaniel White, a young stage driver six years her senior, a native of Lancaster, New Hampshire. For four years after marriage, the Whites boarded in Concord, New Hampshire, his business being such as to render housekeeping inexpedient. For eight years thereafter, they kept house on Warren Street.

In 1848, they moved to a home in Concord, which then fronted on School Street, but after the opening of Capitol Street, when the State House was re-modelled, it was enlarged and improved and the entrance changed to Capitol Street. After Nathaniel's death in 1880, White remained, managing the affairs of the large estate left in her hands, and continuing her interest and efforts in the various charitable, benevolent and reform causes and enterprises, in which she had been engaged for many years.

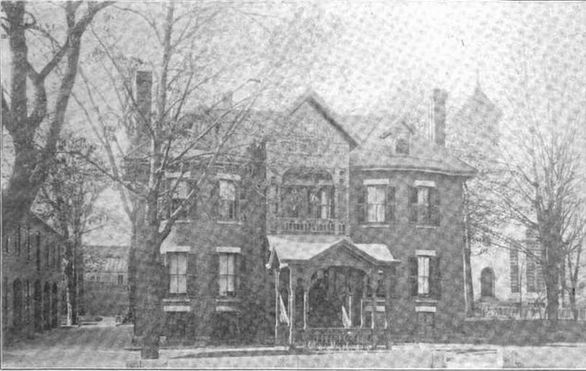
(left to right) White residence on Capitol Street; White Memorial Church. (1916)

Reared as a Quaker, she espoused the cause of Universalism, then just commanding the attention of people in the community, when making her choice of religious affiliation in Concord, and, with her husband, was active in the movement for the organization of a society and the establishment of. regular worship under that name and faith. Fully believing as did her husband also, in woman’s right to active participation in religious as well as civil affairs, it was through their influence that women were admitted to membership in this society—the first in Concord to admit them. She was soon instrumental in the organization of a woman’s auxiliary, known as the Ladies’ Social Aid Society, working in aid of the social and material interests of the denomination, of which she was chosen president, holding that position continually until her death, though for the last few years debarred, on account of physical disability, from the performance of its active duties. Throughout her life, working conjointly with her husband, as in other worthy causes, till his decease, and in her own behalf and in his name thereafter, she gave of her time and means, labor, care and devotion, for the welfare of this church, whose house of worship, originally built largely through their material contribution, and more than once re-modelled and improved in good part at their expense, was named, after Mr. White’s decease, in their honor— the “White Memorial Church.”

She was first and foremost among the women of the city and state in espousing every important cause in the fields of reform and philanthropy, and every movement in which she was interested in, commanded her support in time, money and effort. To the antislavery cause, with her husband, she was earnestly devoted. The temperance movement received their support in New Hampshire; and it was largely through White’s instrumentality that the New Hampshire Woman’s Christian Temperance Union was organized, of which she was elected the first president, holding the position, long in an active and later in an honorary capacity.

No cause was more dear to her, and none so long and persistently labored for, as that whose object was the enfranchisement of her own sex and the elevation of woman to the plane of political equality with man. She was the pioneer of the woman suffrage movement in New Hampshire. She was the first signer of the call for the first equal suffrage convention in the state, held in Eagle Hall, in Concord, in December 1868, in collaboration with Sarah Piper of Concord. White called the meeting to order and was elected the first president of the New Hampshire Woman Suffrage Association then organized, and held that position, until 1895, when she felt compelled to retire, thereafter holding the position of honorary president.

She was a delegate to the American Woman Suffrage Association, organized at Cleveland, Ohio, immediately after the New Hampshire Association was formed, and was vice-president of that association for New Hampshire many years. Mainly through her efforts, supported by her husband, the state legislature, in 1871, made women eligible to serve on school committees, and, in 1878, granted them the right of school suffrage, before any other New England state had accorded them such privilege.

White was active in organizing suffrage meetings and very hospitable in entertaining speakers, Lucy Stone, Mary Livermore, Elizabeth Cady Stanton, Susan B. Anthony, Julia Ward Howe, and many others, having been her guests from time to time. She had in charge the New Hampshire tables at several suffrage bazaars held in Boston, and in various ways contributed to their success.

She was a constant and liberal contributor to the New Hampshire Centennial Home for the Aged, the Orphans' Home at Franklin, and the Mercy Home at Manchester. At the age of ninety-three, she still retained the presidency of the Ladies' Social Aid Society.

== Personal life ==
Nathaniel was born at Lancaster, New Hampshire, February 7, 1811, being a son of Samuel and Sarah (Freeman) White and descendant of William White, an early settler of Essex County, Massachusetts. For a number of years in his youth, he was employed in the Columbian Hotel in Concord. He started in business for himself in 1832, becoming a part owner in the stage route between Concord and Hanover, New Hampshire, later buying the line between Concord and Lowell, Massachusetts. In 1837, in partnership with Captain William Walker, he established himself in the express business, making tri-weekly trips to Boston. Upon the opening of the Concord Railroad in 1842, he became one of the original members of the express company then organized to deliver goods throughout New Hampshire and Canada. In his forty-eight years of business life, he purchased valuable realty in Chicago, hotel property in New Hampshire, and stock in various railroad corporations, banks, manufactories, and other companies, in addition to his interests in the express company and in Concord real estate. He took a deep interest in the establishment of the New Hampshire Asylum for the Insane, the State Reform School, the Orphans' Home at Franklin, New Hampshire, to which he gave a generous endowment, and of the Home for the Aged at Concord. He died at his home in Concord, October 2, 1880.

The children of Mr. and Mrs. White were John A., born March 31, 1838, died November 26, 1899; Armenia E., born March 22, 1847, married Horatio Hobbs of Boston, subsequently deceased: Lizzie H., born February 20, 1849, married Charles H. Newhall of Lynn, Massachusetts, died December 12, 1887; Annie F., born May 22, 1852, died November 9, 1865: Nathaniel Jr., born June 8, 1855, died October 4, 1904; Selden F., born July 10, 1857, died in infancy; Benjamin C., born June 16, 1861. There was also an adopted daughter, Harriet S., widow of Dr. David P. Dearborn of Brattleboro, Vermont.

She and her husband were original members of the Universalist Society in Concord. Long known as the "first lady of the land" in New Hampshire, White died on May 7, 1916.
