= Nathaniel White (businessman) =

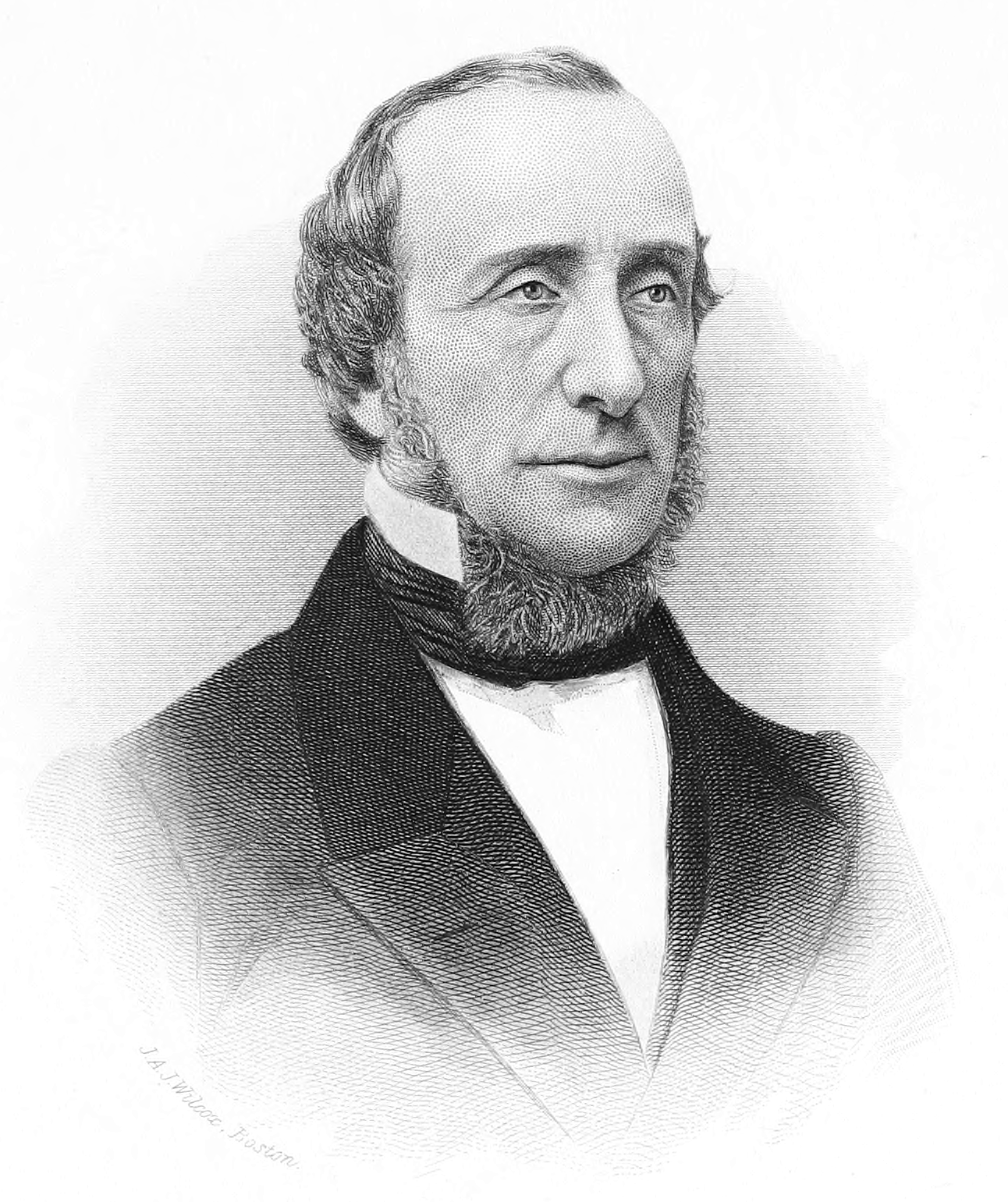
Nathaniel White

Nathaniel White signature

Nathaniel White (February 7, 1811 – October 2, 1880) was an American businessman, social reformer, philanthropist, and politician.

== Early years and education ==
Nathaniel White, the oldest child of Samuel and Sarah (Freeman) White, was born in Lancaster, New Hampshire, February 7, 1811. His ancestors were among the hardy pioneers who settled New England. William White, the founder of the family in the United States, came from England and landed at Ipswich, Massachusetts, in 1635. The descendants of William were among the earliest settlers of northern New Hampshire. His childhood was passed under his mother's care, and she provided strict religious training.

== Career ==
At the age of fourteen, he went into the employ of a merchant of Lunenburg, Vermont, with whom he remained about one year, when he accepted employment with Gen. John Wilson, of Lancaster, who was just entering upon his duties as landlord of the Columbian Hotel in Concord, New Hampshire. His parents more readily consented to his taking this step on account of the many noble qualities of Mrs. Wilson. To her care he was entrusted by his own mother. In the employ of Gen. Wilson, White commenced life in Concord in an entry-level position. He arrived in Concord, August 25, 1826, with one shilling in his pocket. For five years, or until he came of age, he continued at the Columbian Hotel, rendering a strict account of his wages to his father, and saving the dimes and quarters which came as perquisites, until by his twenty-first birthday, he had a fund of US$250.

In 1832, he made his first business venture, negotiating the first and last business loan of his life, and purchased a part interest in the stage route between Concord and Hanover, New Hampshire, and occupying the "box" himself for a few years. In one year, he was free from debt. Soon after, he bought into the stage route between Concord and Lowell, Massachusetts. In 1838, in company with Capt. William Walker, he initiated the Pony Express business, making three trips weekly to Boston, and personally attending to the delivery of packages, goods, or money, and other business entrusted to him. In 1842, upon the opening of the Concord Railroad, he was one of the original partners of the express company which was then organized to deliver goods throughout New Hampshire and Canada. The company was successfully operated under various names, and it was indebted to White for its remarkable financial success.

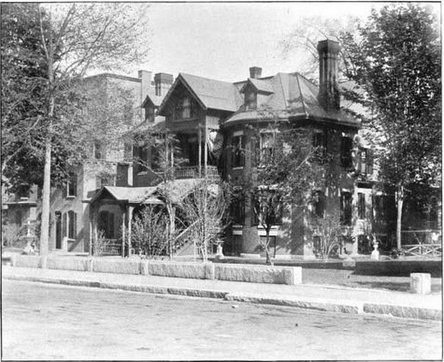
White residence, whose grounds were situated from School to Capitol streets (1894)

In 1846, White purchased his farm, and cultivated it till his death. It lay in the southwestern section of the city, 2 miles (3 km) from the statehouse, and contained over 400 acres (160 ha) of land. He evinced a strong attachment to Concord, and to him, the city owed much of her material prosperity.

In 1852, he made his first step in political life, being chosen by the Whigs and Free-soilers to represent Concord in the New Hampshire state legislature. He was an abolitionist from the start; a member of the Anti-Slavery society from its inception. His hospitable home was the refuge of many a hunted slave, a veritable station on the under-ground railroad, where welcome, care, food, and money were freely bestowed. The attic of his house and the hay-mows of his stable were resting places for persecuted black men.

In all works of charity and philanthropy, White was foremost or prominent. He was deeply interested in the establishment of the New Hampshire Asylum for the Insane and the State Reform School; in the Orphans' Home, at Franklin, New Hampshire, which he liberally endowed; and the Home for the Aged, in Concord, which was his special care. The Reform Club of Concord, though not an eleemosynary institution, received substantial benefits from his generosity.

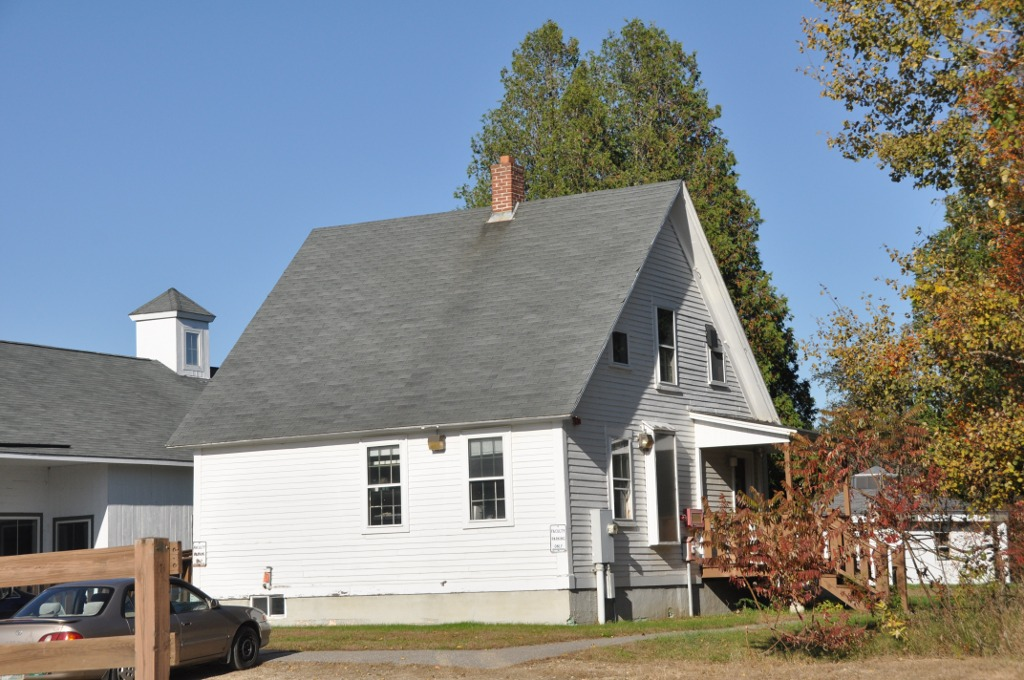
White Farm

Besides his extensive interest in the express company, his farm, —which was one of the most highly cultivated in the state,— his charming summer retreat on the borders of Lake Sunapee, and his real estate in Concord, he was interested in real estate in Chicago, in hotel property in the mountain districts, in railroad corporations, in banks, in manufacturing establishments, and in shipping. He was a director in the Manchester & Lawrence, the Franconia & Profile House, and the Mount Washington railroads, and in the National State Capital Bank. He was a trustee of the Loan and Trust Savings Bank of Concord; also of the Reform School, Home for the Aged, and Orphans' Home, and other private and public trusts.

In 1875, White was candidate for governor, of the Prohibition Party; and he had a vast number of friends in the Republican party, with which he was most closely identified, who wished to secure his nomination for the highest honor within the gift of a state, by the Republican party. In 1876, he was sent as a delegate to the Republican National Convention, which nominated Rutherford B. Hayes for president. During the summer of 1880, he was placed by his party at the head of the list of candidates for presidential electors.

== Personal life ==
November 1, 1836, he married Armenia S., daughter of John Aldrich, of Boscawen, New Hampshire, who survived him. Their children were John A. White, Armenia E. White, wife of Horatio Hobbs, Lizzie H. White, Nathaniel White, Jr., and Benjamin C. White, who survive. They lost two children, — Annie Frances and Seldon F.; and adopted one, — Hattie S., wife of Dr. D. P. Dearborn, of Brattleboro, Vermont.

In early life, White joined the Independent Order of Odd Fellows. He belonged to no other secret society. During the first four years of their married life, on account of his occupation, they boarded. For eight years, they lived on Warren Street. From 1848, until his death, they resided on School Street. White died October 2, 1880, having been stricken down suddenly.
