= House by the Side of the Road =

Historic house in New Hampshire, United States

- U.S. National Register of Historic Places
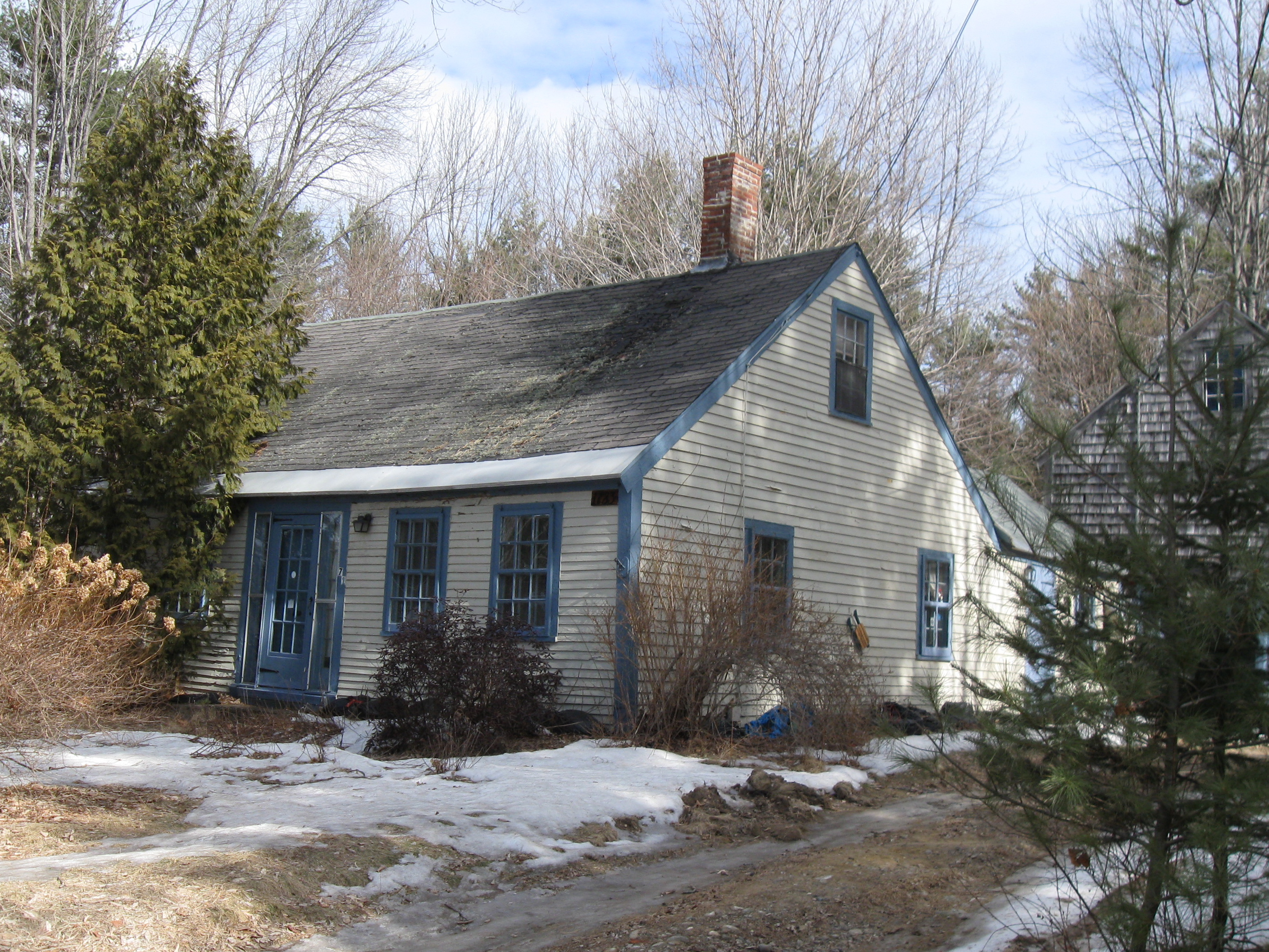
- The house in February 2010

- Location within New Hampshire Location within the United States
- Location: 61 School St., Tilton, New Hampshire, U.S.
- Coordinates: 43.4472°N 71.5888°W
- Area: 0.5 acres (0.20 ha)
- Built: 1783
- Demolished: March 2020
- NRHP reference No.: 80000265
- Added to NRHP: November 26, 1980

The House by the Side of the Road was a historic house at 61 School Street (Note: The photo accompanying this article, taken in 2010, shows the number of house to then be 71. The house itself matches photographs in the NRHP listing.) in Tilton, New Hampshire. The house, built circa 1783, was a modest 1 1/2-story Cape-style house five bays wide, with a center entry and a central chimney. The house was locally notable as the home of poet Sam Walter Foss in 1877–78, when he was attending Tilton Seminary, and was known as the "House by the Side of Road" after Foss's poem of the same name, (Note: Whether the house that Foss had in mind was located in Tilton or Candia has been a matter of some dispute. A New Hampshire historical marker, number 141 in Candia, states the poem "was believed to have been inspired by his boyhood home, on Brown Road, in this town.") since the 1890s. The house was listed on the National Register of Historic Places in 1980. It was demolished in March 2020.

== Description and history ==
The house was located a short way north of the Tilton School, on the east side of School Street opposite some of the school's athletic fields, set on a small wooded parcel. It was a 1 1/2-story wood-frame structure, with a side-gable roof, off-center brick chimney, and clapboarded exterior. The chimney was one of two the house once had, and was covered by a corbelled cap. The street-facing front facade was five bays wide, with the main entrance at the center, flanked by sidelight windows. The other windows were rectangular six-over-six sash, framed by simple corner boards. The house was not architecturally distinguished, and was typical of late 18th-century residential construction in rural New Hampshire.

The house was built about 1783, and was an example of period vernacular architecture. It was most noted for its literary association with the poet Sam Walter Foss, who lived here in 1877–78, while attending the Tilton School (then known as Tilton Seminary).

Records of the town of Tilton show that the house at 71 School Street was demolished in March 2020, and was replaced by a new house, which received a certificate of occupancy in November 2023. Google Street View shows the original house present in August 2013, and a new house of similar design present as of June 2023, with the same barn behind it.

== See also ==
- National Register of Historic Places listings in Belknap County, New Hampshire
