= White Farm =

- U.S. National Register of Historic Places
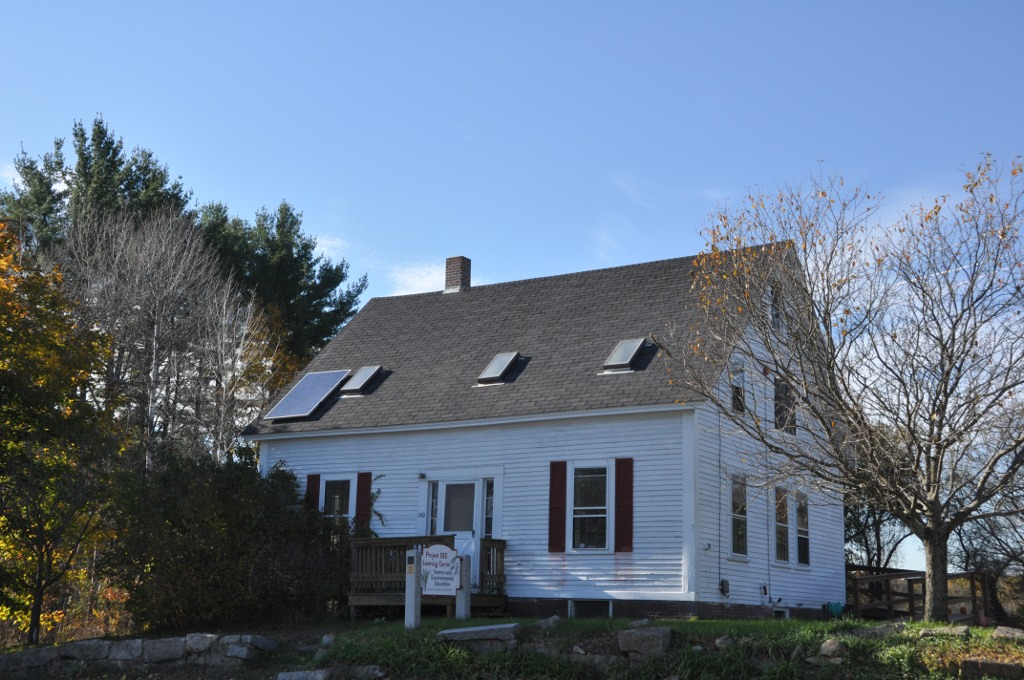
- One of the farm manager houses

- Location within New Hampshire Location within the United States
- Location: 144 Clinton St., Concord, New Hampshire
- Coordinates: 43°11′19″N 71°33′37″W
- Area: 136 acres (55 ha)
- Built: 1846
- Architectural style: Greek Revival
- NRHP reference No.: 81000075
- Added to NRHP: May 15, 1981

White Farm is a historic farm property on Clinton Street (New Hampshire Route 13) in Concord, New Hampshire. Located about two miles (3.2 km) west of downtown Concord, the farm is now owned by the state, but includes a number of historically significant buildings, and is one of the largest open space areas in the city near its downtown. It was listed on the National Register of Historic Places in 1981.

== Description and history ==
The farm was established in 1846 by Nathaniel White, who became prominent in state politics, running for governor under the banner of the Prohibition Party. White also operated the first stagecoach service between Concord and Hanover, and was active in the Underground Railroad. Concord's White Memorial Universalist Church was named in his honor, and White Park was established as a gift from White's widow, Armenia. His farm, about 400 acres (160 ha), was described as one of the largest and most successful in the area.

The farm is now 136 acres (55 ha) in size, bounded on the south by Clinton Street and the west by the Turkey River. It includes White's 1846 Greek Revival house, which was extended with an addition late in the 19th century, a complex of 19th-century barns, and two smaller Greek Revival houses at 148 and 152 Clinton Street, which were probably farm manager residences. The State uses the complex for management of surplus goods and equipment.

== See also ==
- National Register of Historic Places listings in Merrimack County, New Hampshire
