= Greenfield Meeting House =

Historic church in New Hampshire, United States

- U.S. National Register of Historic Places
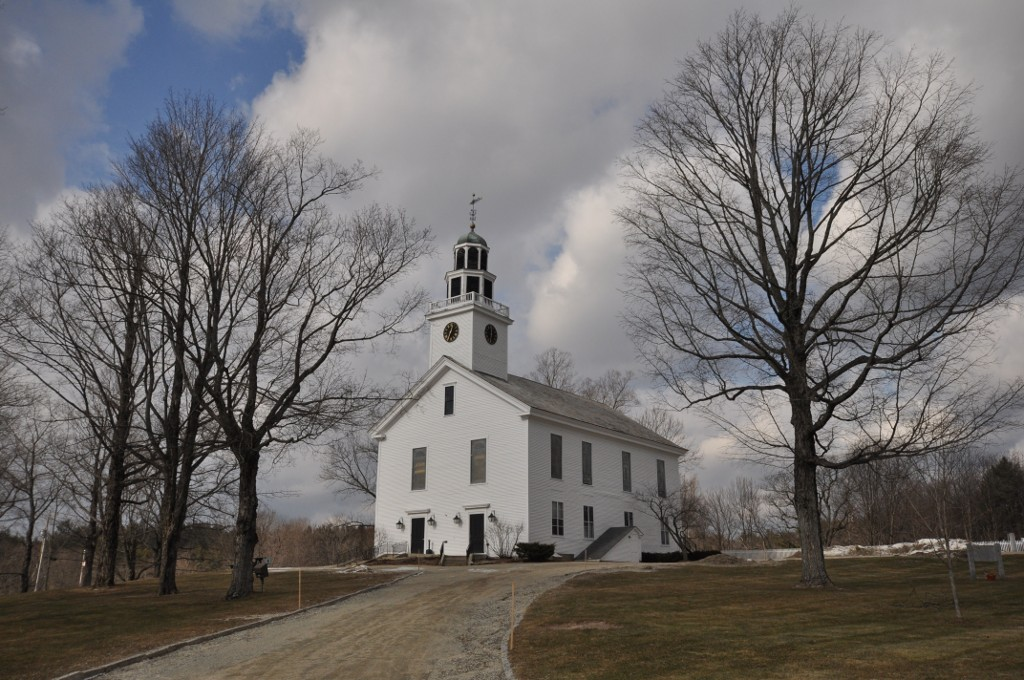

- Location within New Hampshire Location within the United States
- Location: Forest Rd., Greenfield, New Hampshire
- Coordinates: 42°57′3″N 71°52′21″W
- Area: 1.8 acres (0.73 ha)
- Built: 1795
- Architect: Hugh Gregg
- Architectural style: Greek Revival
- NRHP reference No.: 83004090
- Added to NRHP: December 8, 1983

The Greenfield Meeting House is a historic meeting house on Forest Road in the center of Greenfield, New Hampshire. The two-story wood-frame building was built in 1795; it is one of a small number of 18th century meeting houses in New Hampshire, and is believed to be the oldest still used for both religious and secular purposes, hosting both church services and town functions. The building was listed on the National Register of Historic Places in 1983.

== Description and history ==
The Greenfield Meeting House is located on a rise overlooking the village center of Greenfield, on the north side of Forest Road between Sawmill and Francestown Roads. When originally built, it was roughly square, with a gallery instead of full second floor, and porches at the gable ends that sheltered stairs to the gallery level. The bell tower was added in 1825, and the gallery level was filled out in 1848. In 1867 the building underwent major alterations: it was rotated ninety degrees and raised two feet, a vestibule was built, and the belltower placed atop it. These alterations transformed the previously Federal-style building into one that resembles a more typical Greek Revival structure. A clock manufactured by E. Howard & Co. was installed in the tower in 1895.

The meeting house was built in 1795; its frame and exterior were built by Hugh Gregg, but the joiners of its original interior finishes are not known. The building's evolutionary construction history gives a distinctive window into changes in taste and usage of meeting houses over time. Its initial form was one that was quite common in the surrounding hill towns, and the 1825 addition of a bell tower was a nod to the growing trend towards towers on religious buildings. The 1848 separation of civic and religious areas was the town's solution to state-mandated separation of church and state, and the 1867 reorientation completed the transformation of the building to a more typical 19th-century church appearance. Interior alterations to the religious sanctuary also echoed trends, including the removal of the high pulpit in favor of a reading desk, and the replacement of box pews with bench pews.

== See also ==
- National Register of Historic Places listings in Hillsborough County, New Hampshire
- New Hampshire Historical Marker No. 130: Town Meeting House
