= Chester Village Cemetery =

- U.S. National Register of Historic Places
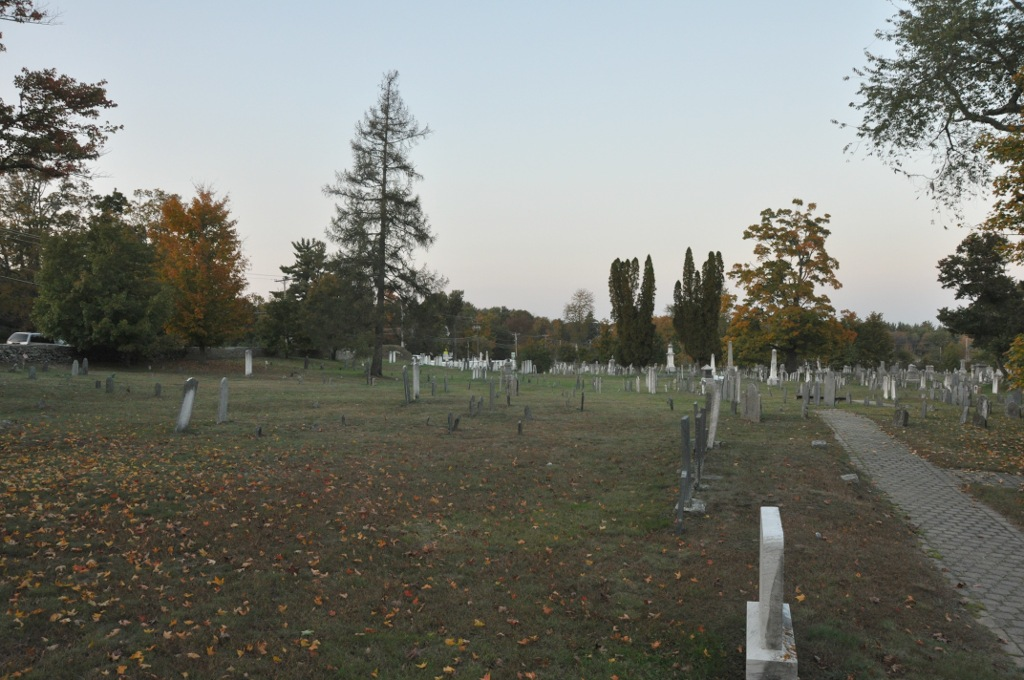

- Location within New Hampshire Location within the United States
- Location: NH 102 and NH 121, Chester, New Hampshire
- Coordinates: 42°57′27″N 71°15′22″W
- Area: 2.5 acres (1.0 ha)
- NRHP reference No.: 79000203
- Added to NRHP: November 29, 1979

Chester Village Cemetery is a historic cemetery at the junction of New Hampshire Routes 102 and 121 in the center of Chester, New Hampshire. Established in 1751, it is one of the state's older cemeteries, and is particularly unusual for the large number of grave markers that were signed by their carvers. It was added to the National Register of Historic Places in 1979.

== Description and history ==
The Chester Village Cemetery is located in the town center of Chester, at the eastern corner of Routes 102 and 121. The property is about 2.5 acres (1.0 ha) in size, and roughly rectangular in shape. The long side, along Route 121, is also its oldest portion; known as the "Revolutionary Quarter", it is about 1 acre (0.40 ha) in size, and has many graves dating to the period of the American Revolutionary War. Monuments in this older section are predominantly of either slate or sandstone, although there are some that are marble.

The cemetery was established in 1751, and became the town's main burying ground. Prior to that time, many families had buried their dead either in small family plots or in church yards; after this cemetery was established, many moved their dead here. The cemetery has one of the largest number of signed gravestones in the region. Two prominent local stone carvers were Stephen and Abel Webster, both of whose works appear here (Abel Webster is also buried here). This has enabled researchers to differentiate their styles from each other, making possible the identification of their work in other regional cemeteries.

Prominent burials include two Governors of New Hampshire, Samuel and John Bell, and William Richardson, Chief Justice of the New Hampshire Supreme Court.

== See also ==
- National Register of Historic Places listings in Rockingham County, New Hampshire
- New Hampshire Historical Marker No. 139: Chester Village Cemetery
