= Second Rindge Meetinghouse, Horsesheds and Cemetery =

Historic church in New Hampshire, United States

- U.S. National Register of Historic Places
- U.S. Historic district
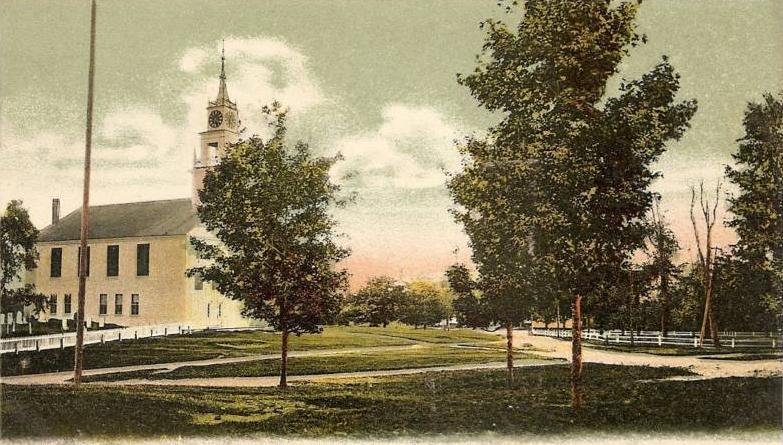
- Meetinghouse c. 1906

- Location within New Hampshire Location within the United States
- Location: Old US 202 and Rindge Common, Rindge, New Hampshire
- Coordinates: 42°44′59″N 72°0′37″W
- Area: 3 acres (1.2 ha)
- Built: 1794
- Architect: Barker, William; Barker, David
- NRHP reference No.: 79003791
- Added to NRHP: October 05, 1979

The Second Rindge Meetinghouse, Horsesheds and Cemetery is a historic meeting house and cemetery on Old US 202 (Main Street) and Rindge Common in Rindge, New Hampshire. Built in 1796, it is relatively distinctive in New England as one of few such meeting houses where both civic and religious functions are still accommodated, housing both the town offices and a church congregation. The town's first cemetery, established in 1764, lies to the north of the meetinghouse. It is the resting place of many of Rindge's early settlers, and of its American Revolutionary War veterans. Behind the meetinghouse stand a row of horse sheds, the only one of the two rows of them which originally served the meetinghouse. The property was listed on the National Register of Historic Places in 1979.

== Description and history ==
The Second Rindge Meetinghouse stands prominently in the village center of Rindge, on the north side of School Street at its junction with Main Street and Payson Hill Road. It is a 2-1/2 story timber frame structure, with a gabled roof and clapboarded exterior. Its front facade is wide, with three entrances on the ground floor and five sash windows on the second, with a row of short windows in the gallery level below the pedimented gable. A square tower rises to an open belfry, clock stage, and spire.

The building was built in 1796, replacing the town's first meeting house, which stood on approximately the same site and had been built about 1766. After the state mandated the separation of church and state with respect to these types of buildings, an arrangement was made in 1820 in which the property was owned by the town, and space within it was leased to the church congregation.

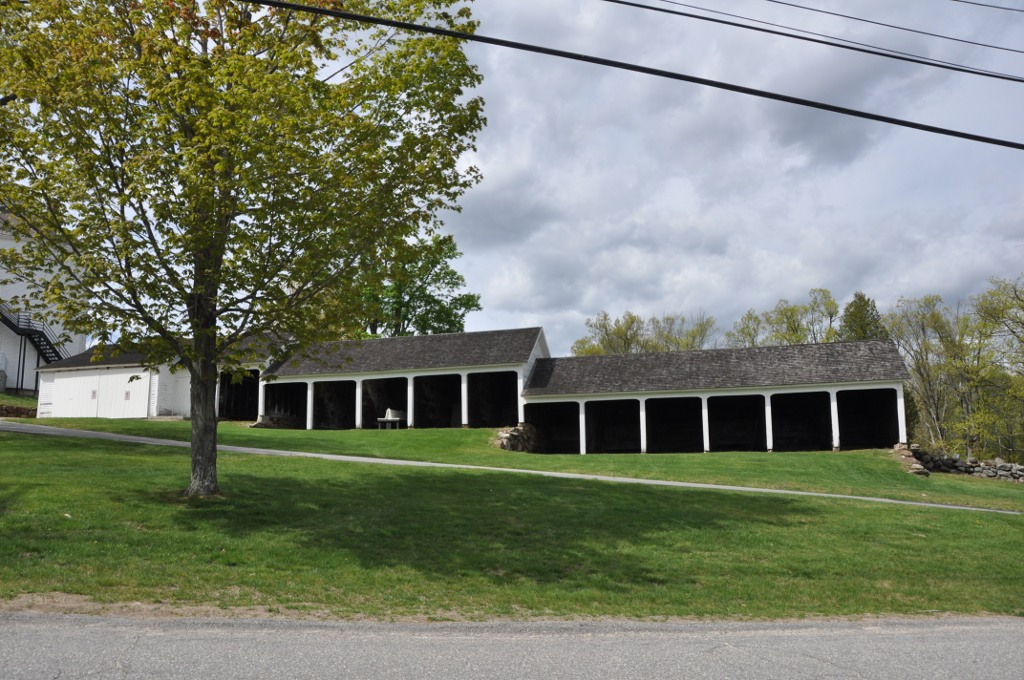
The sheds, which are located behind the meeting house

== See also ==
- National Register of Historic Places listings in Cheshire County, New Hampshire
- New Hampshire Historical Marker No. 138: Second Rindge Meeting House
